= Tourism in Moldova =

Travel brand of Moldova representing the Tree of Life, used by the Moldovan Investment and Tourism Agency. It is based on traditional carpet and embroidery patterns which are part of the UNESCO Intangible Heritage.

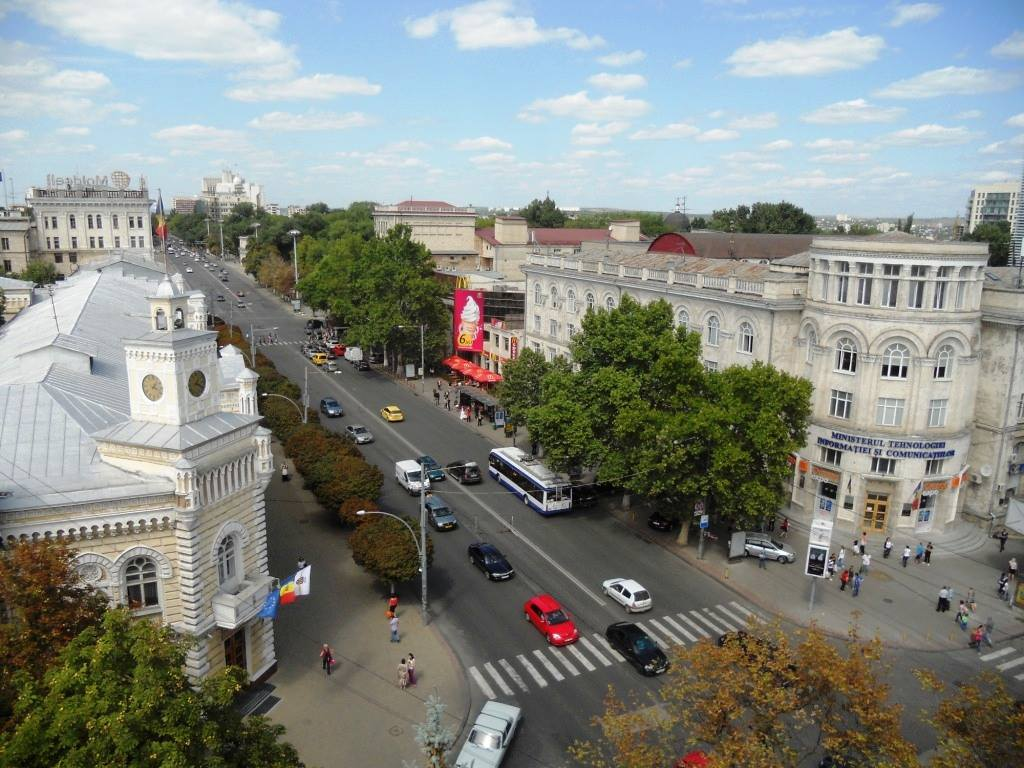
Ștefan cel Mare Boulevard from Chișinău

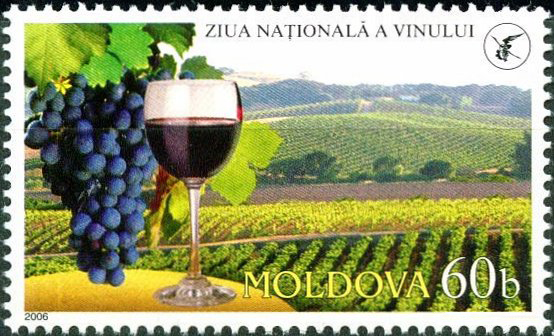
Moldovan stamp commemorating National Wine Day

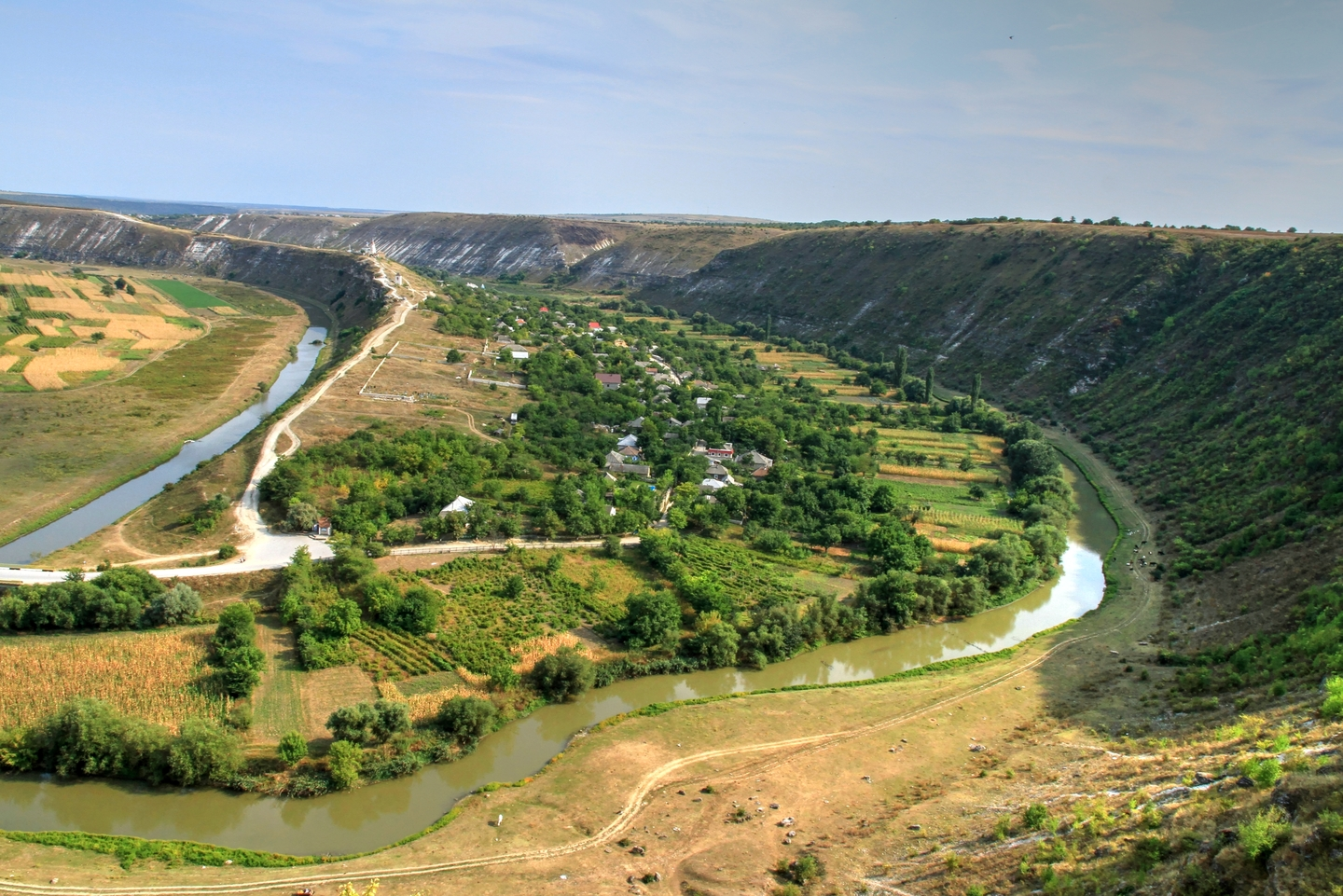
Orhei National Park

Tourism in the Republic of Moldova is a part of the economy of Moldova. Moldova is a country in Eastern Europe near Romania and Ukraine.

== Travel regulations ==
CIS citizens do not need a visa to visit Moldova: Azerbaijan, Kyrgyzstan, Tajikistan, Armenia, Uzbekistan, Belarus, Ukraine, Georgia, Russia, Turkmenistan.

Since January 2007, Moldova has established a visa-free regime for the US, Canada, Japan, Switzerland, Israel.

From 2012 Moldova allows Turkish citizens to visit the country without having to obtain a visa.

There is a visa-free regime between the Republic of Moldova and citizens of the European Union (27 states), including Austria, Poland, the Netherlands, Romania, Slovenia, Germany, Hungary, Slovakia and others whose citizens can enter the Republic of Moldova without a visa for up to 90 days within any 180-day period.

== Tourism options ==
=== Wine tourism ===
The traditions of Moldovan wine are more than 7000 years old, so winemaking has become an integral part of Moldovan culture. There are more than 150 wineries in the country that produce wines, cognacs and champagne. The apotheosis of the local alcoholic paradise is the annual National Wine Day, the largest wine festival in Eastern Europe, held on the first weekend of October. From 2013 Moldova put its focus on implementing a EU model based on protected geographical indications (PGIs, which means the wine is originated in a particular region and its quality can be guaranteed). This system now covers four growing areas of Valul lui Traian, Stefan Voda, Codru and Divin. As the result, Moldova has made impressive progress in upgrading the quality of its wines over the last five years which was clearly appreciated by wine lovers and professionals across the world:

- In 2018 Moldovan wines won over 420 medals at such prestigious international contests as: Decanter World Wine Awards, Mundus Vini, Concours Mondial du Bruxelles, International Wine Challenge, etc.
- In 2019 with more Moldovan wines meeting the PGI standard the country's vintages earned over 800 medals in global competitions, 300 of them were gold ones. So it's no wonder that more and more wine connoisseurs around the world are enjoying unique Moldovan varieties: Purcari Pinot Grigio, Feteasca Neagra, Feteasca Alba, Feteasca Regala, Rara Neagra, Viorica.
- Milestii Mici is included in the Guinness Book as the winery with the largest collection of wines in the world (1.5 million bottles)
- Castel Mimi. The vineyards were planted by the governor of Bessarabia, Konstantin Mimi, in 1893, and a chateau was built in 1901.
- Poiana Wine. Brand new winery opened in 2018 in the heart of Moldovan Codri
- Cricova is a real “underground city” 120 km long and with a collection of 1.25 million bottles of rare wines.
- Purcari was founded in 1827, and the quality of the wines is best illustrated by the fact that Negru de Purcari was the favorite wine of the British Queen Victoria.
- Chateau Vartely, arelatively new winery with two tasting rooms and a tourist complex.
- EtCetera, a family winery in the south-east of Moldova with hotel and swimming pool.

=== Religious tourism ===
Moldova is an Orthodox country with deep Christian traditions. There are over 50 monasteries and 700 churches in the country. Most popular monasteries are:

- Curchi monastery
- Căpriana monastery
- Hâncu monastery
- Tipova monastery
- Saharna monastery
- Old Orhei monastery
- Noul Neamț Monastery

== Attractions ==
- Căpriana monastery - is one of the oldest monasteries of Moldova, located in Căpriana
- Central Chișinău
- Hâncu monastery
- Muzeul Memoriei Neamului - is a museum in Chişinău dedicated to the "victims of the Soviet occupation" of Bessarabia and Northern Bukovina, and commemorating anti-communist resistance in the region
- National History Museum of Moldova - is a museum in Central Chişinău
- Noul Neamț Monastery - an all-male Moldovan Orthodox monastery located in Chiţcani
- Old Orhei - historical and archaeological complex, located in Trebujeni, Orhei National Park
- Saharna Monastery
- Soroca Fort - historic fort in the Republic of Moldova, in the modern-day city of Soroca.
- Mansion of Manuc Bey - is a museum near Chişinău

== Gallery ==
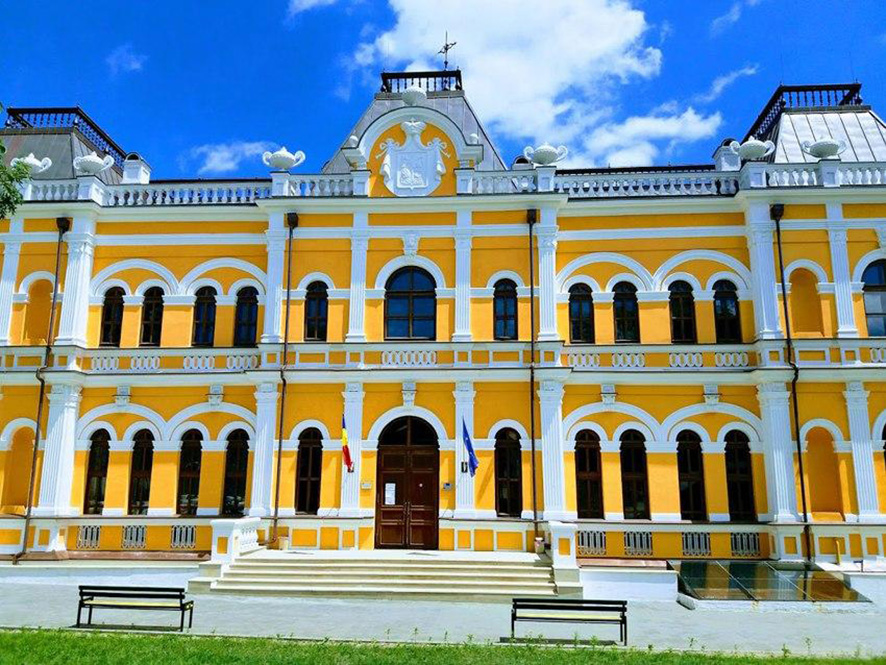
Mansion of Manuc Bey

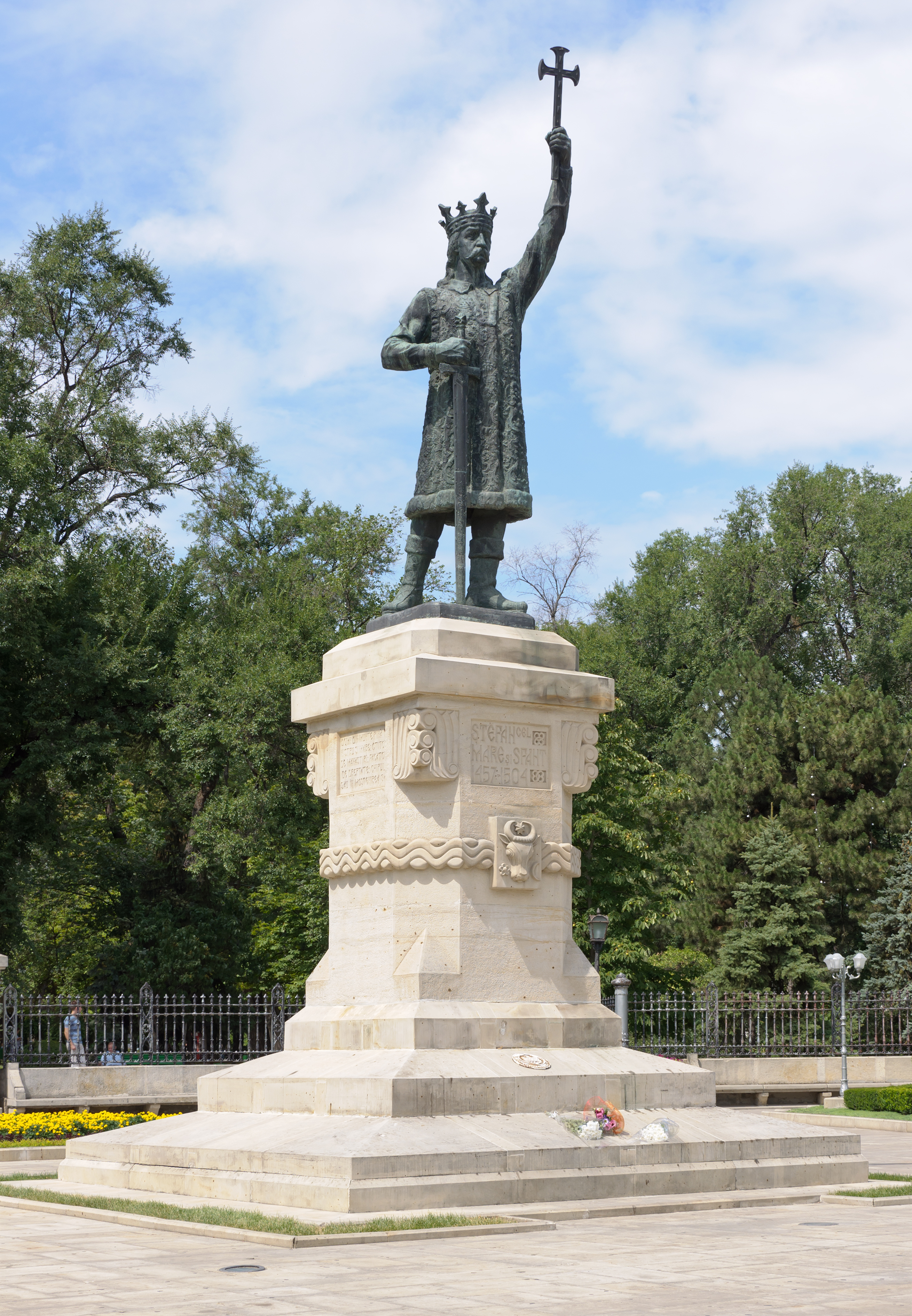
Stephen the Great Monument

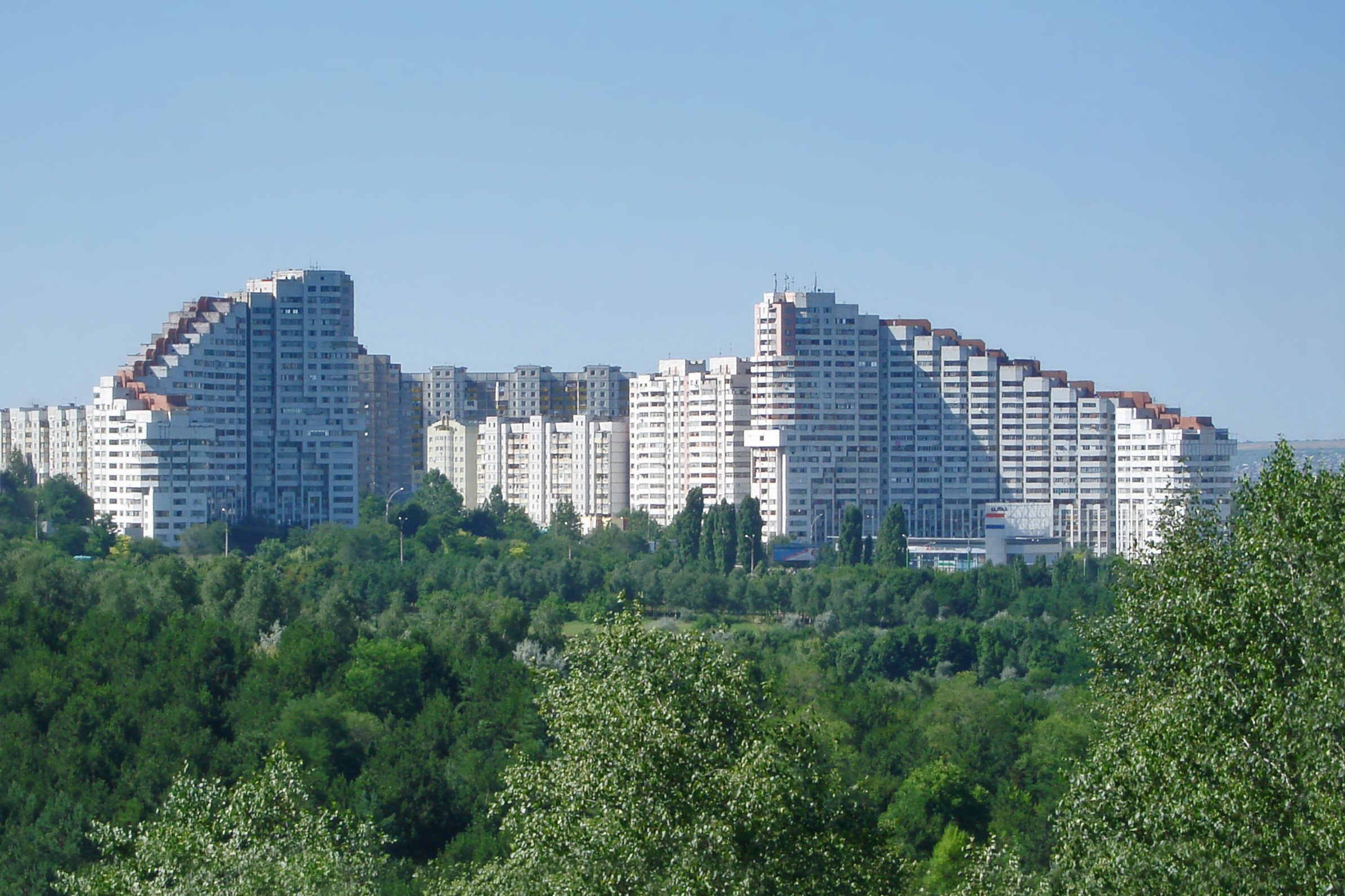
City gates, Chișinău

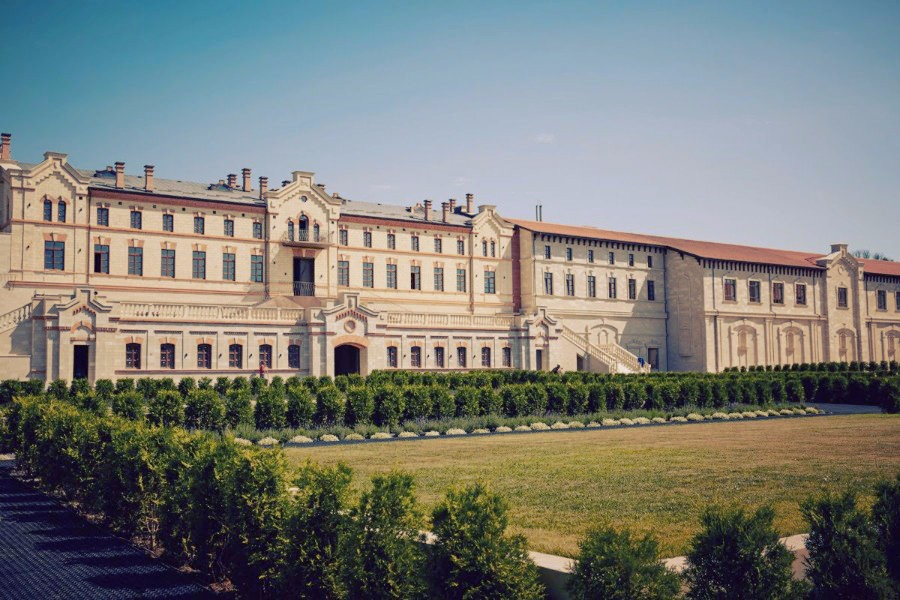
Mimi Wine Castle

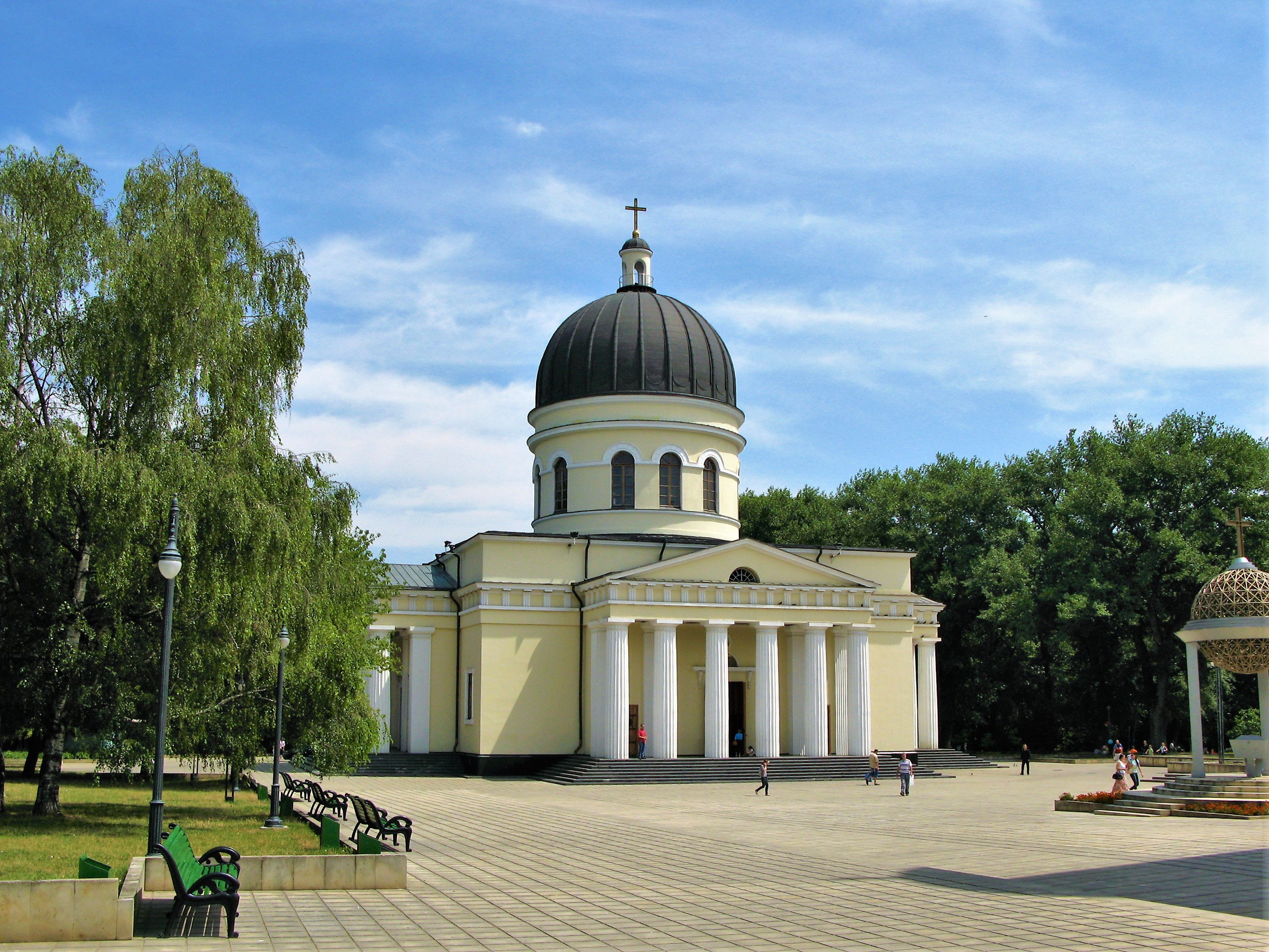
Nativity Cathedral, Chișinău

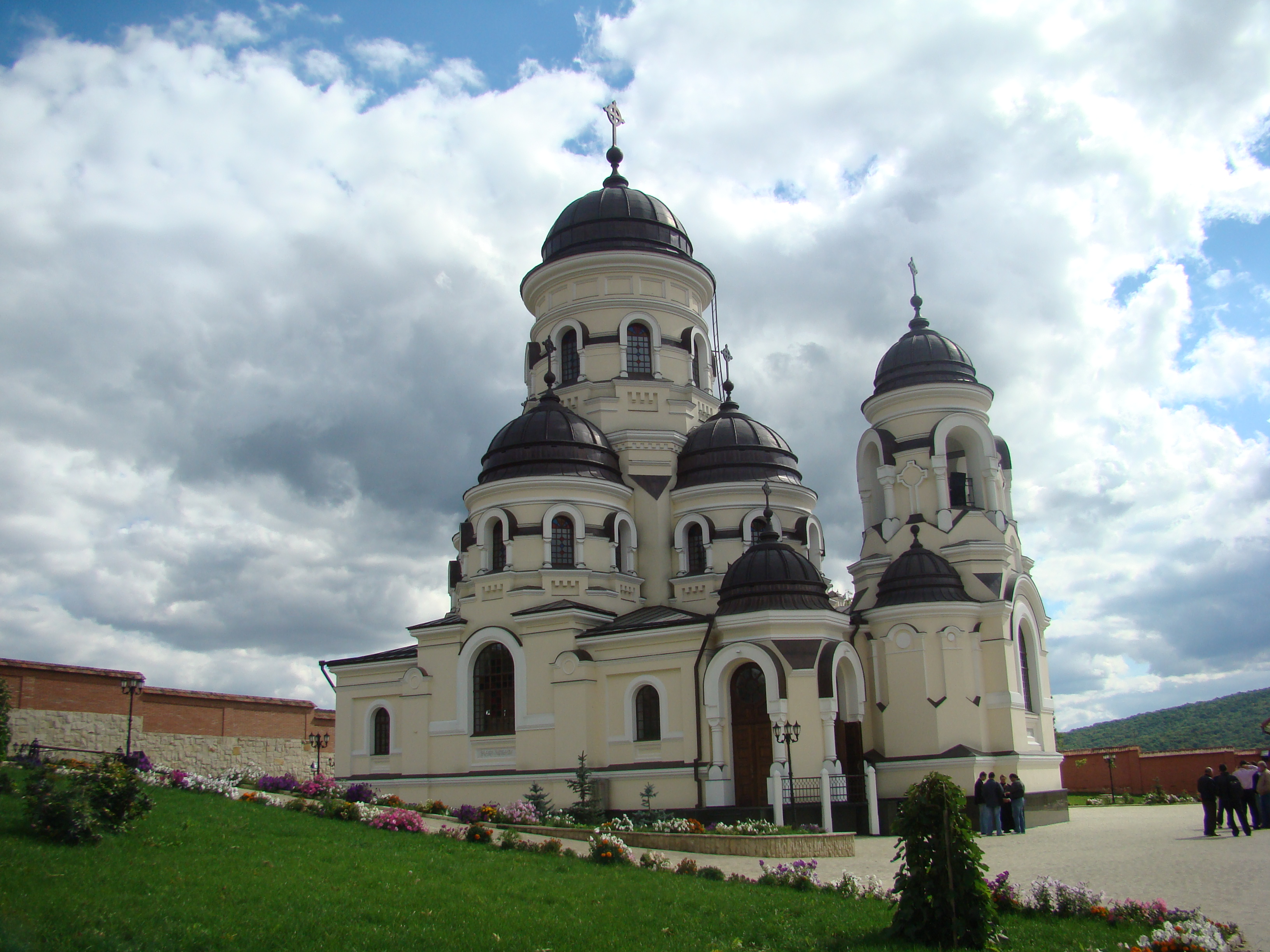
Căpriana Monastery

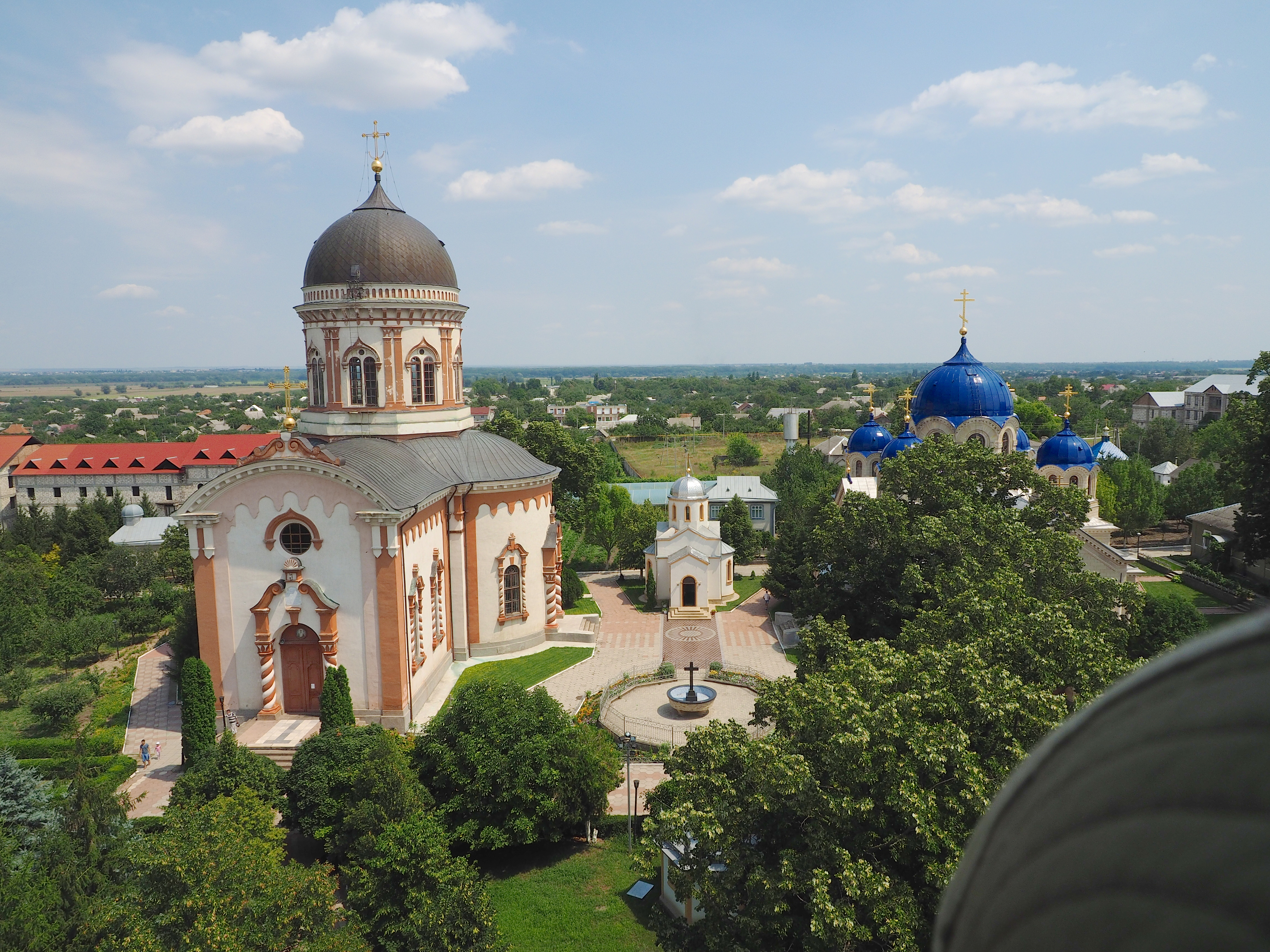
Noul Neamț Monastery

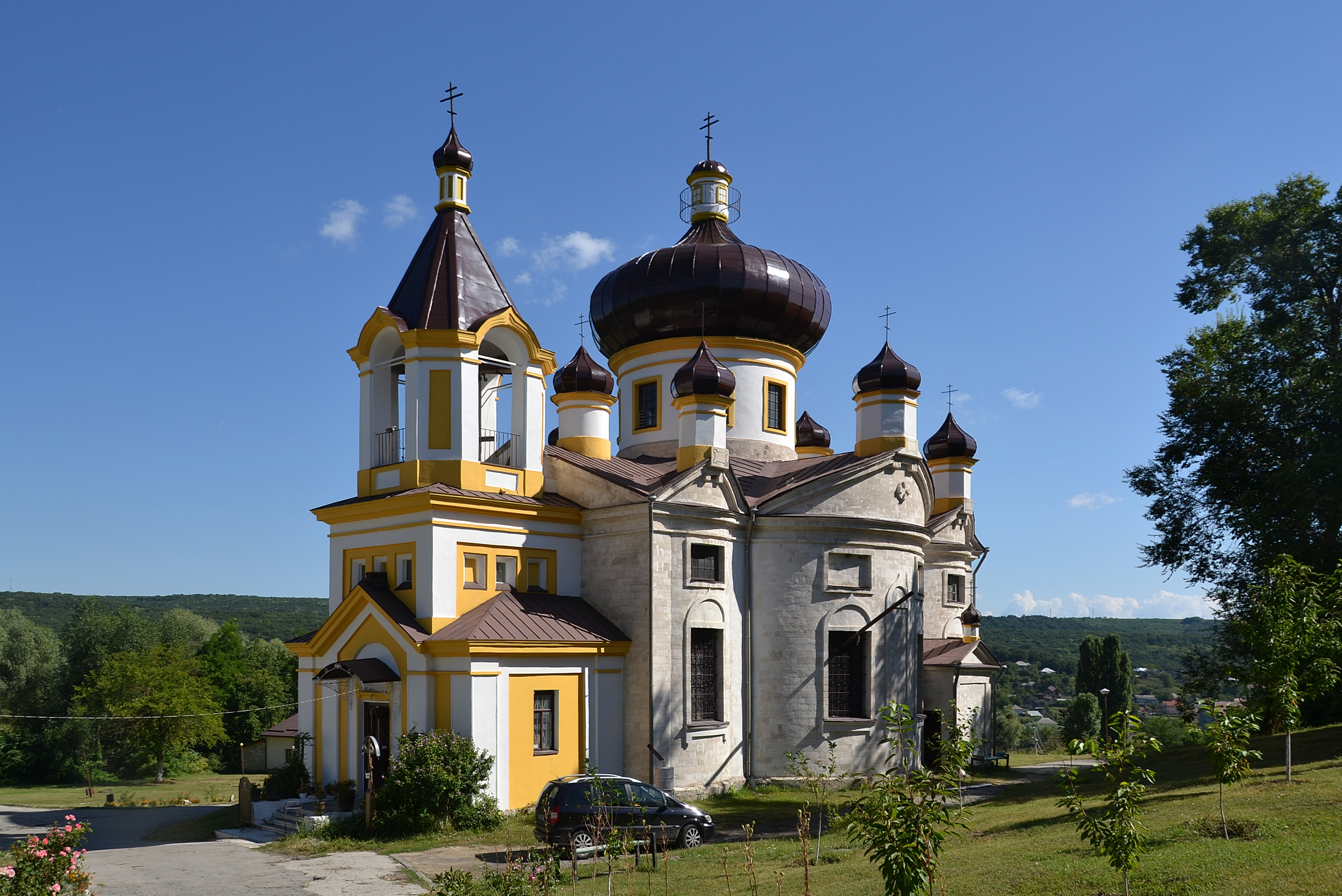
Condrița Monastery

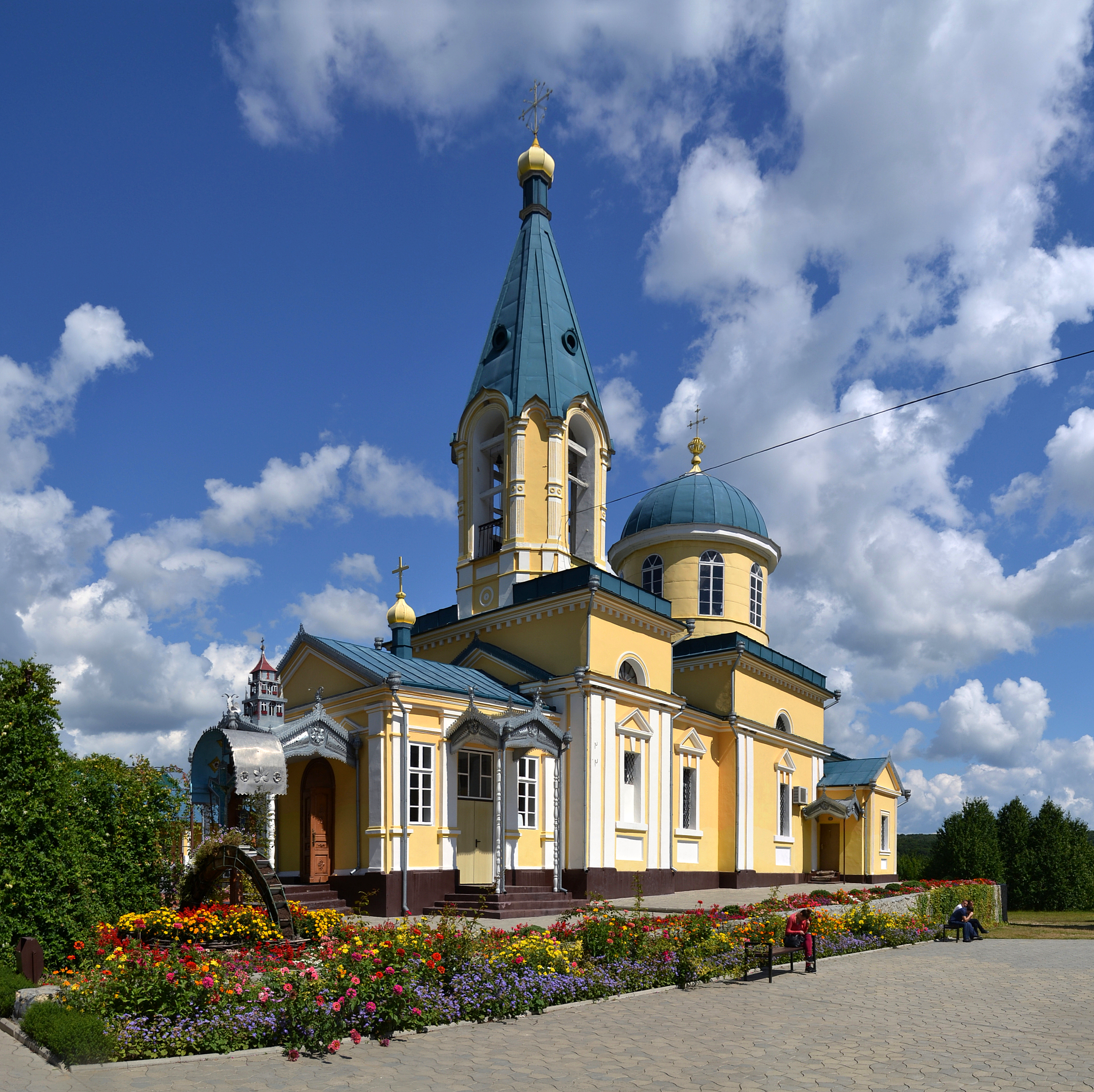
Hâncu monastery

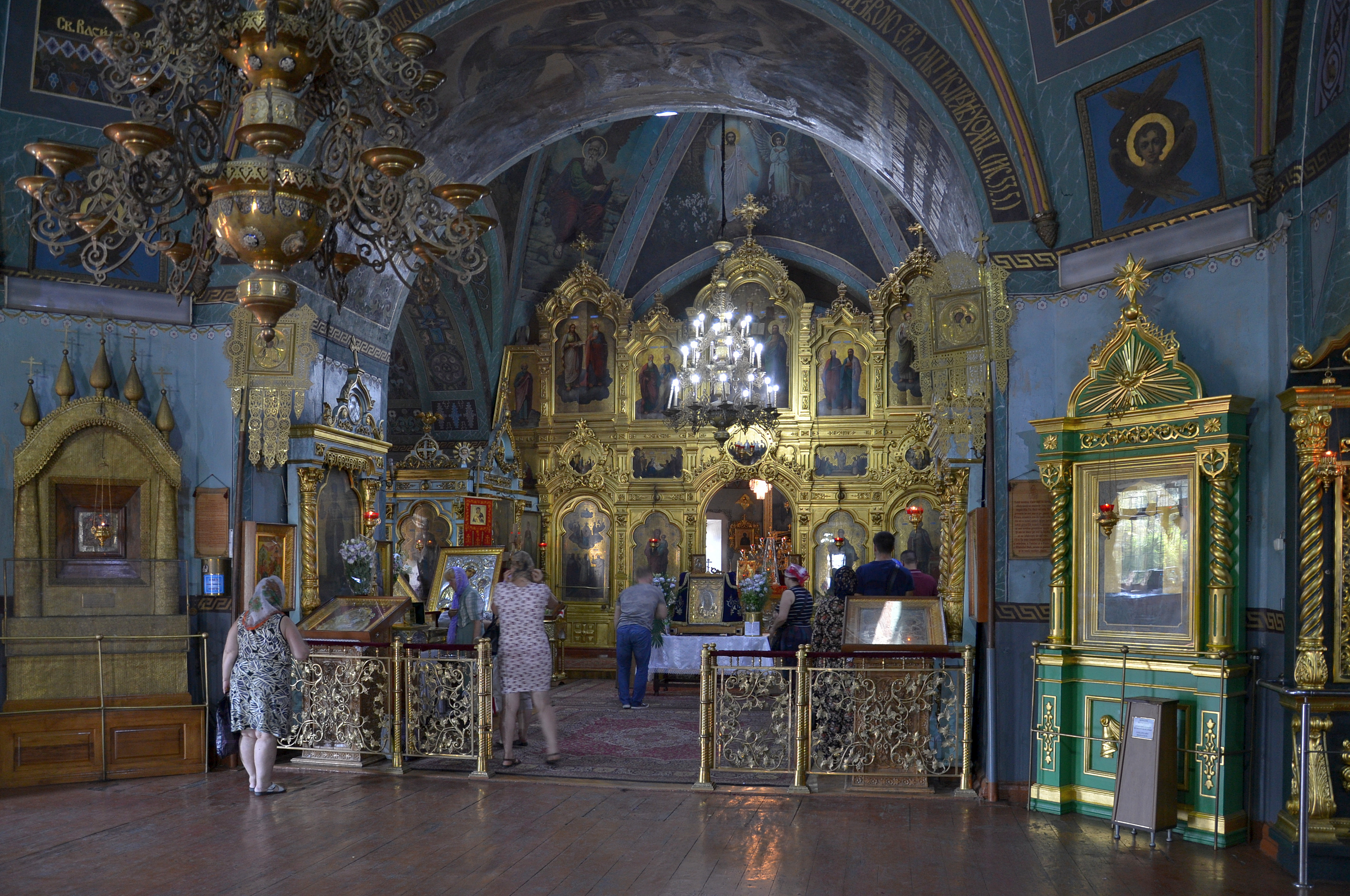
Ciuflea Monastery

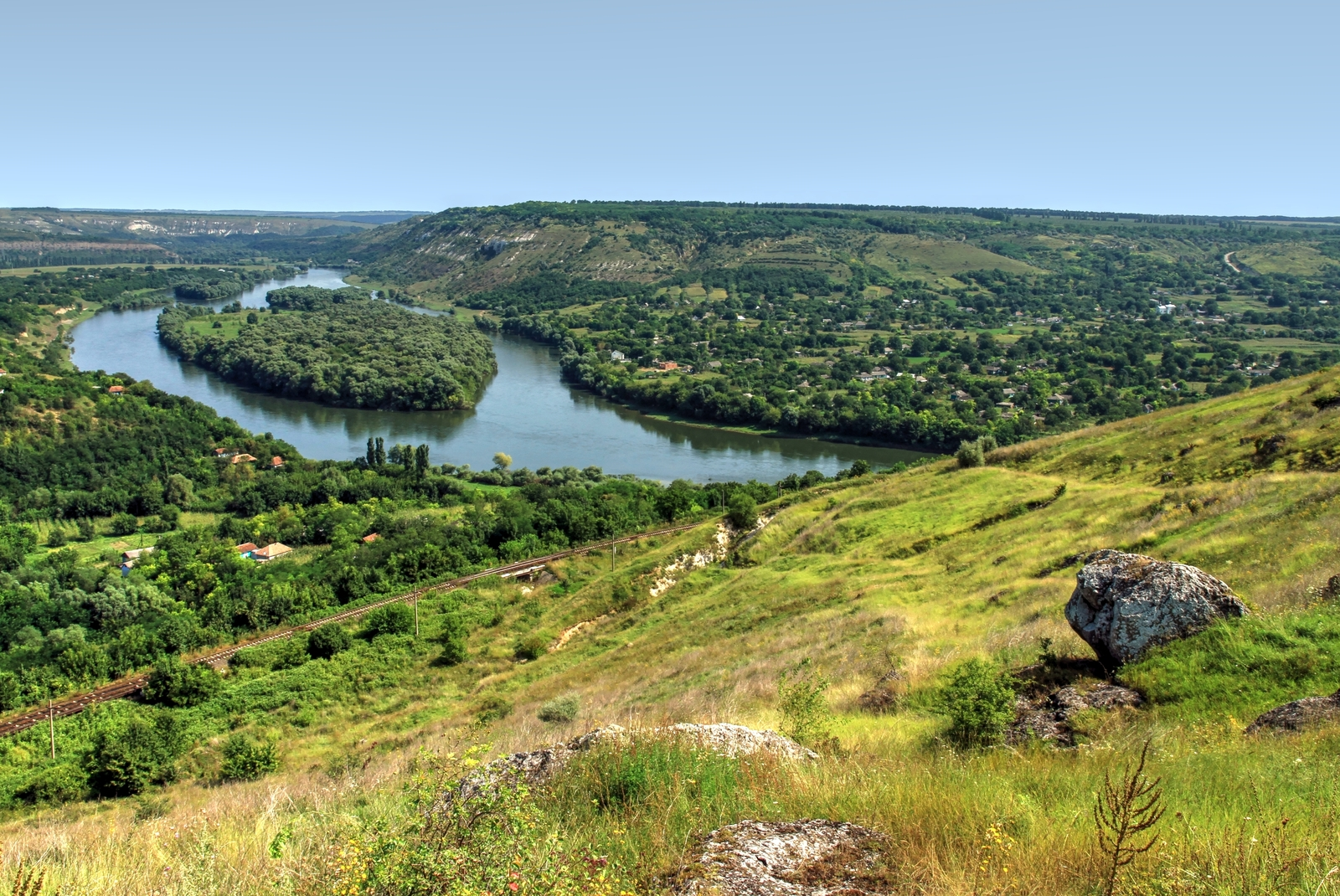
Nistru Valley View

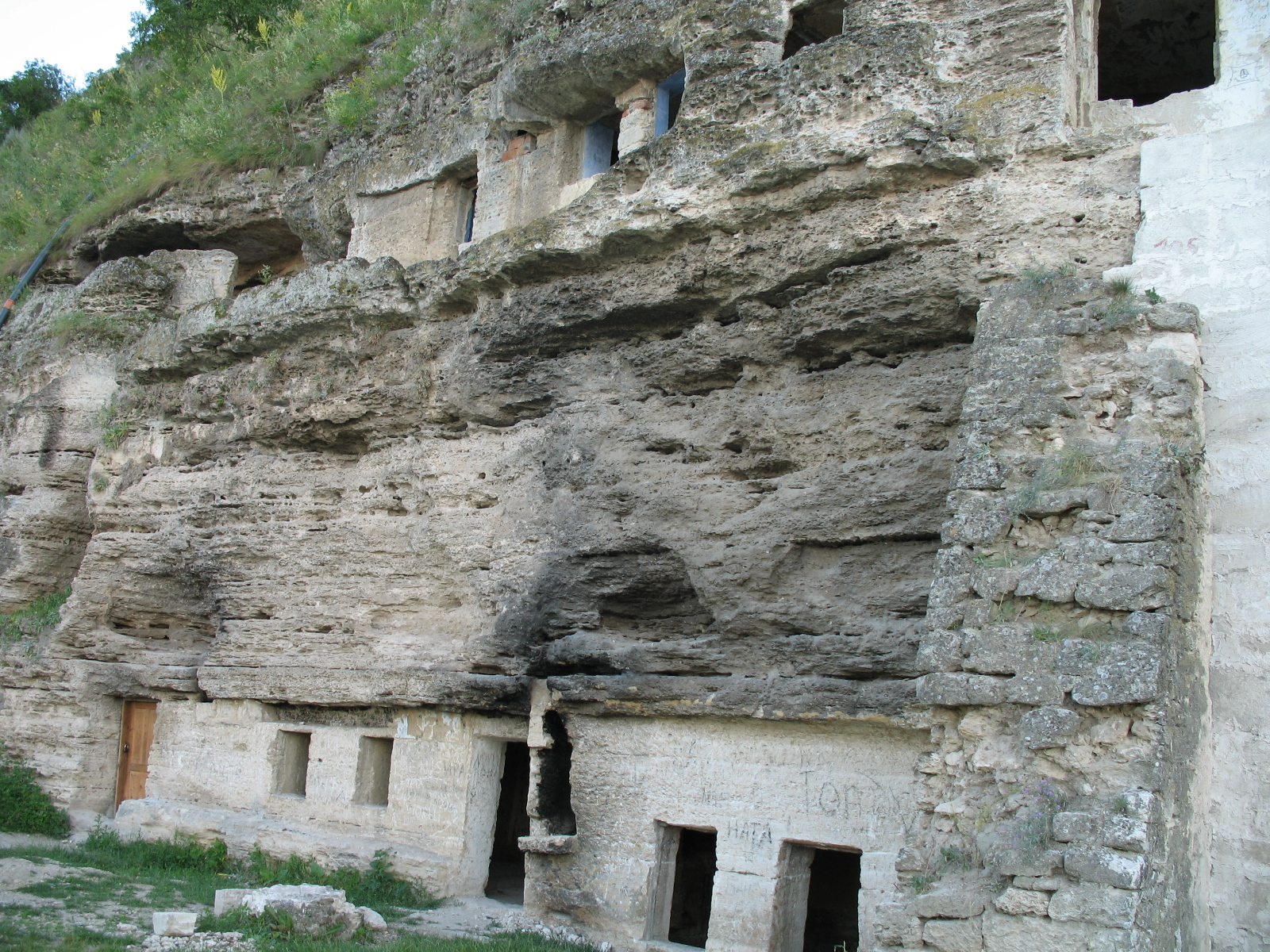
Rocky Monastery near Tipova

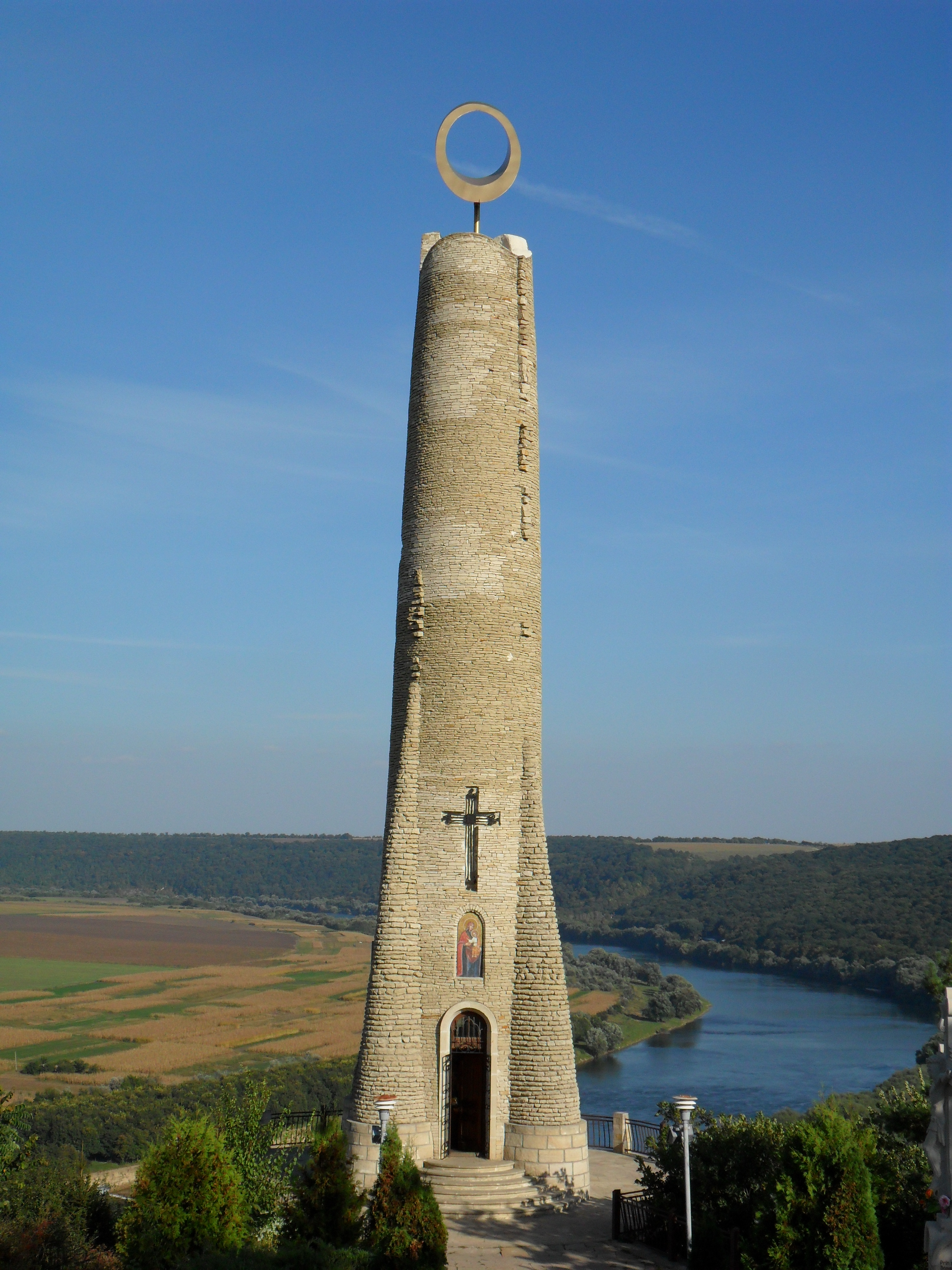
Candle of Gratitude

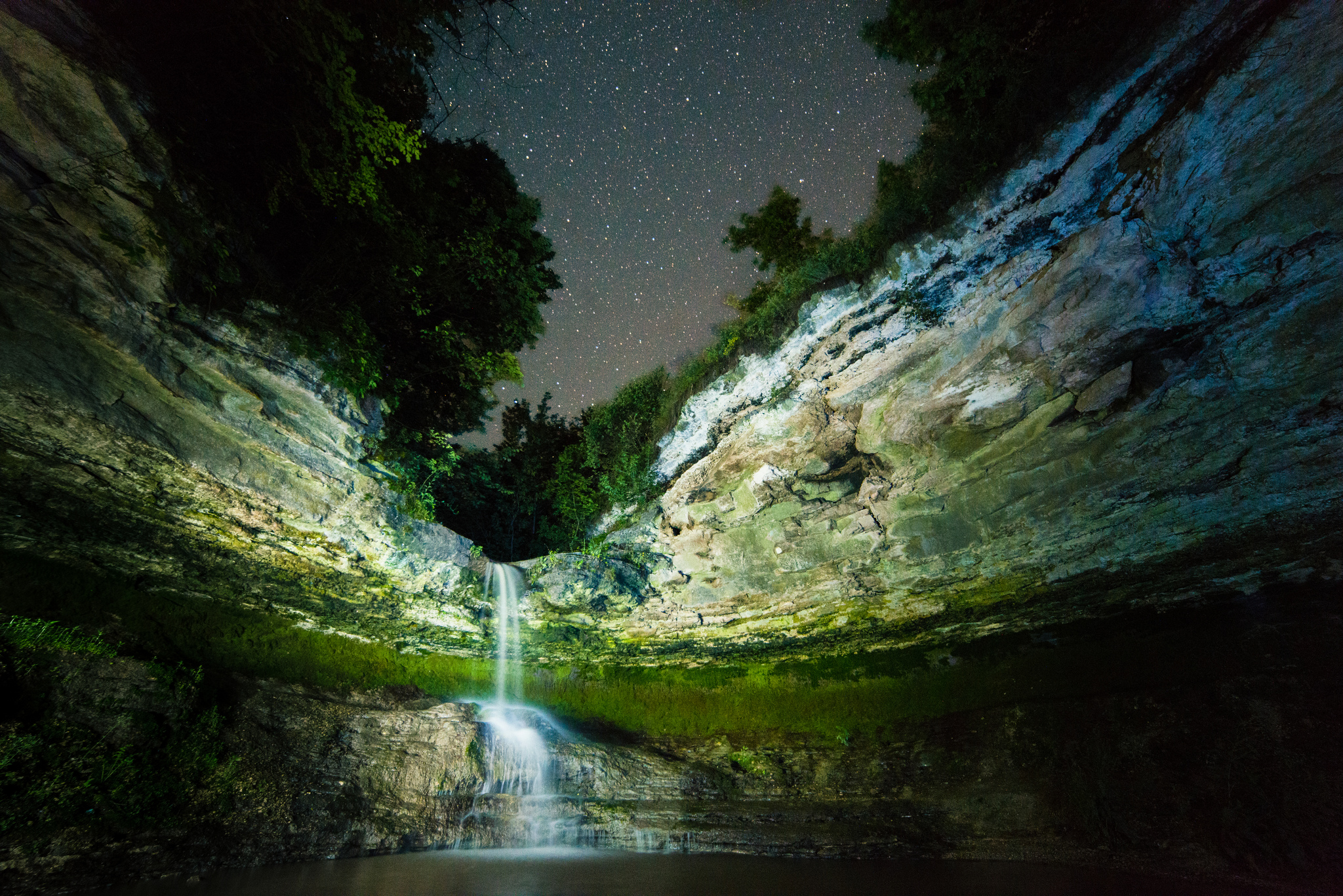
Saharna Waterfall

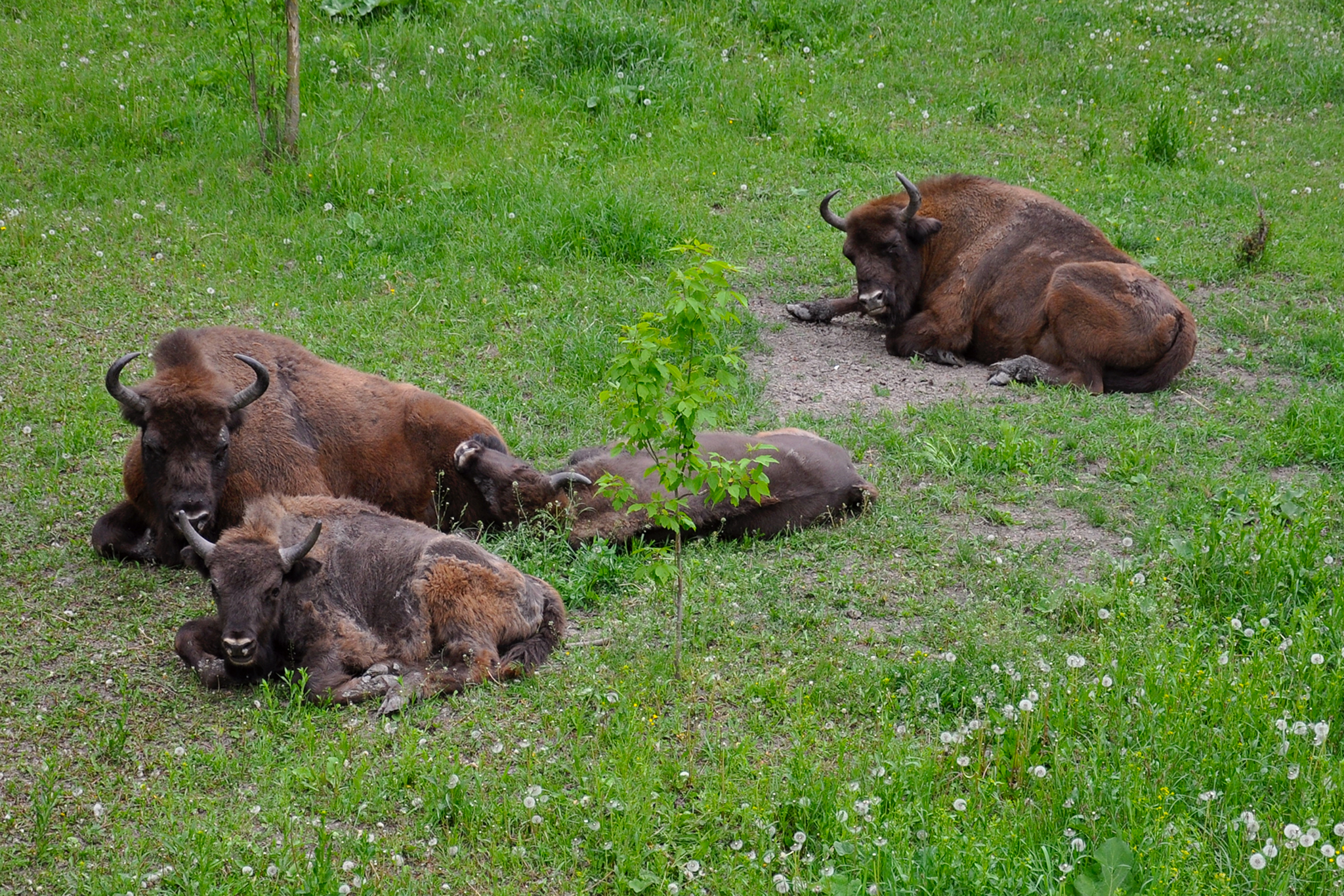
European bisons in Pădurea Domnească natural reserve

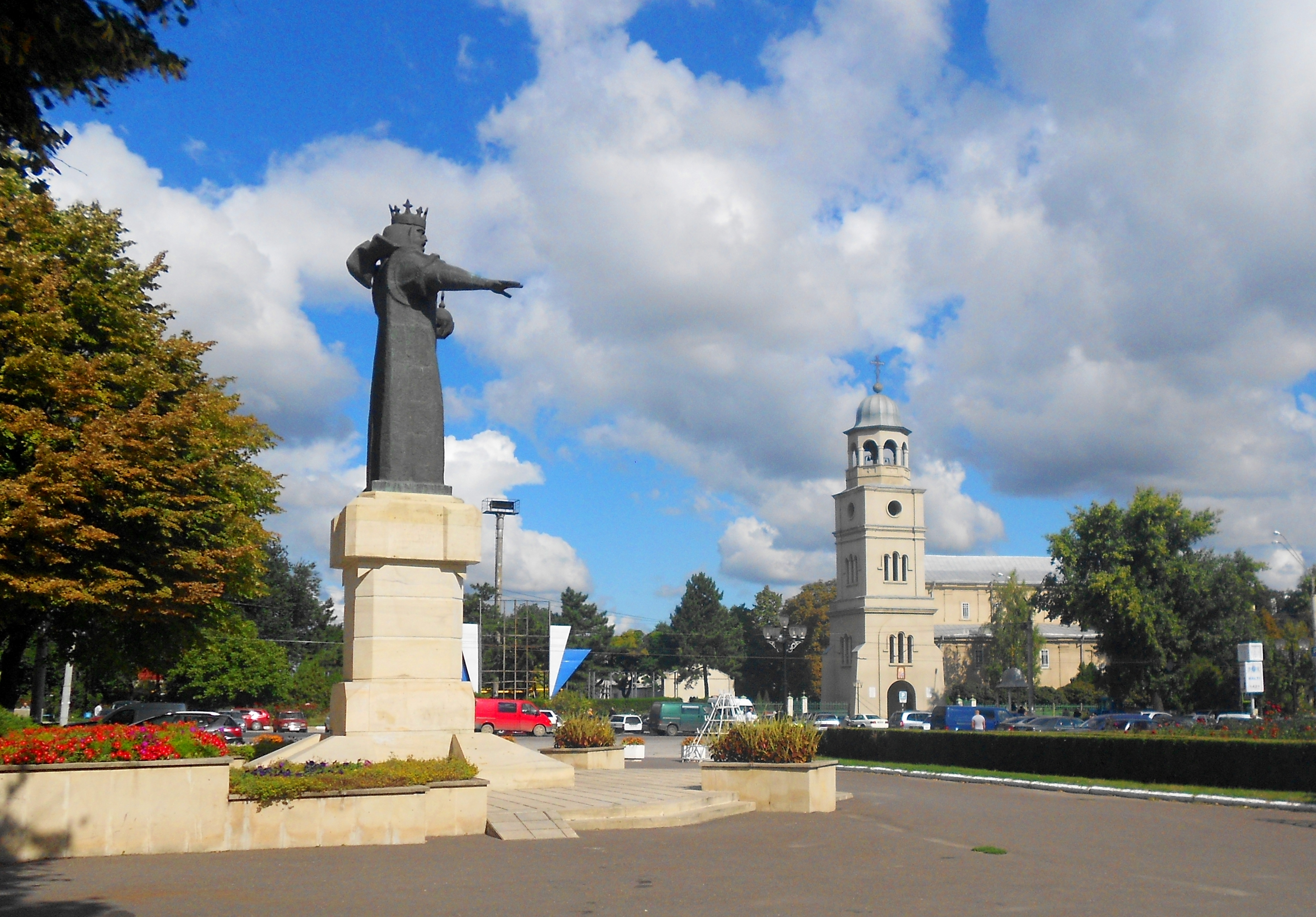
Independence Square, Bălți

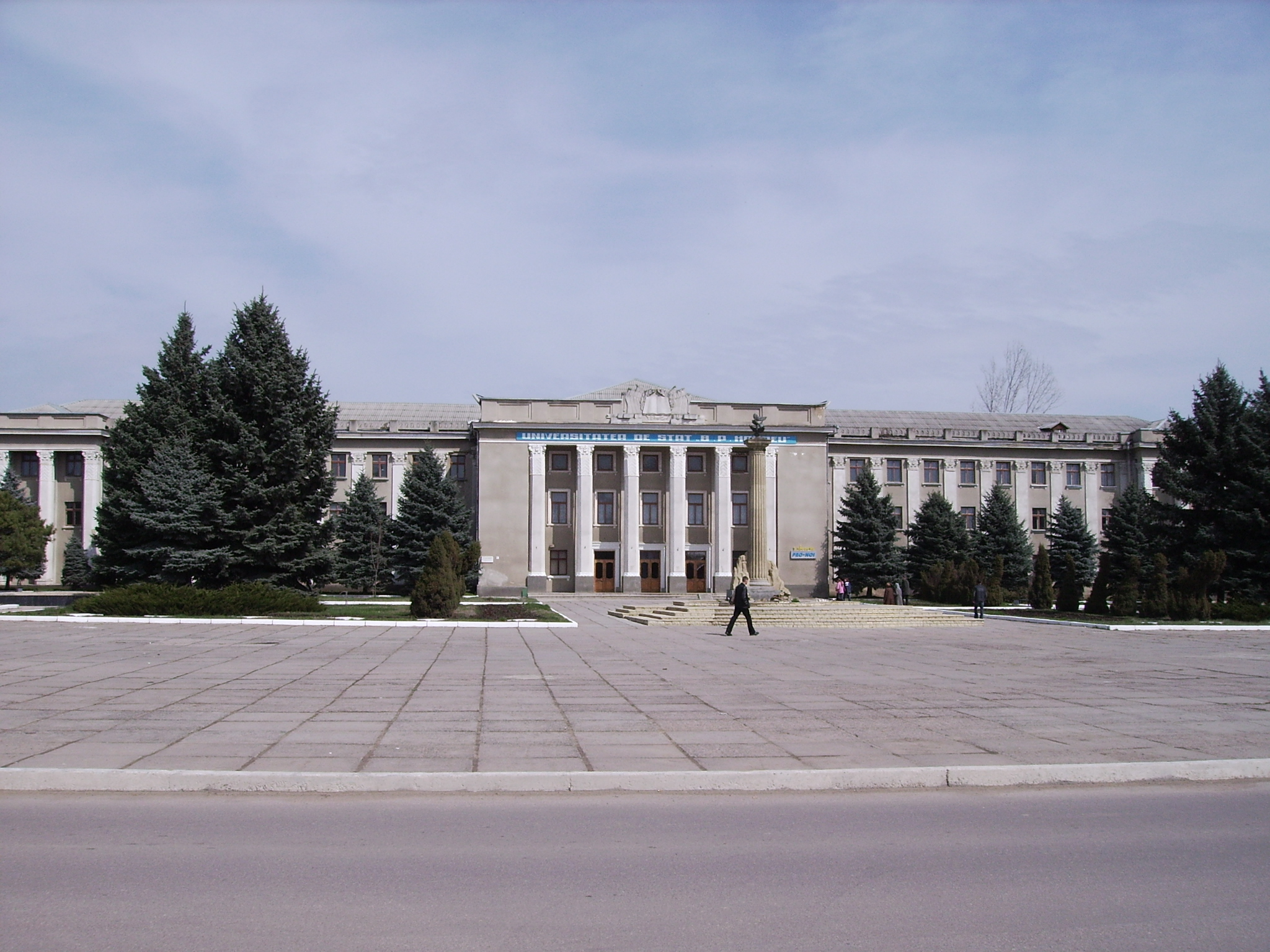
Bogdan Petriceicu Hasdeu State University, Cahul

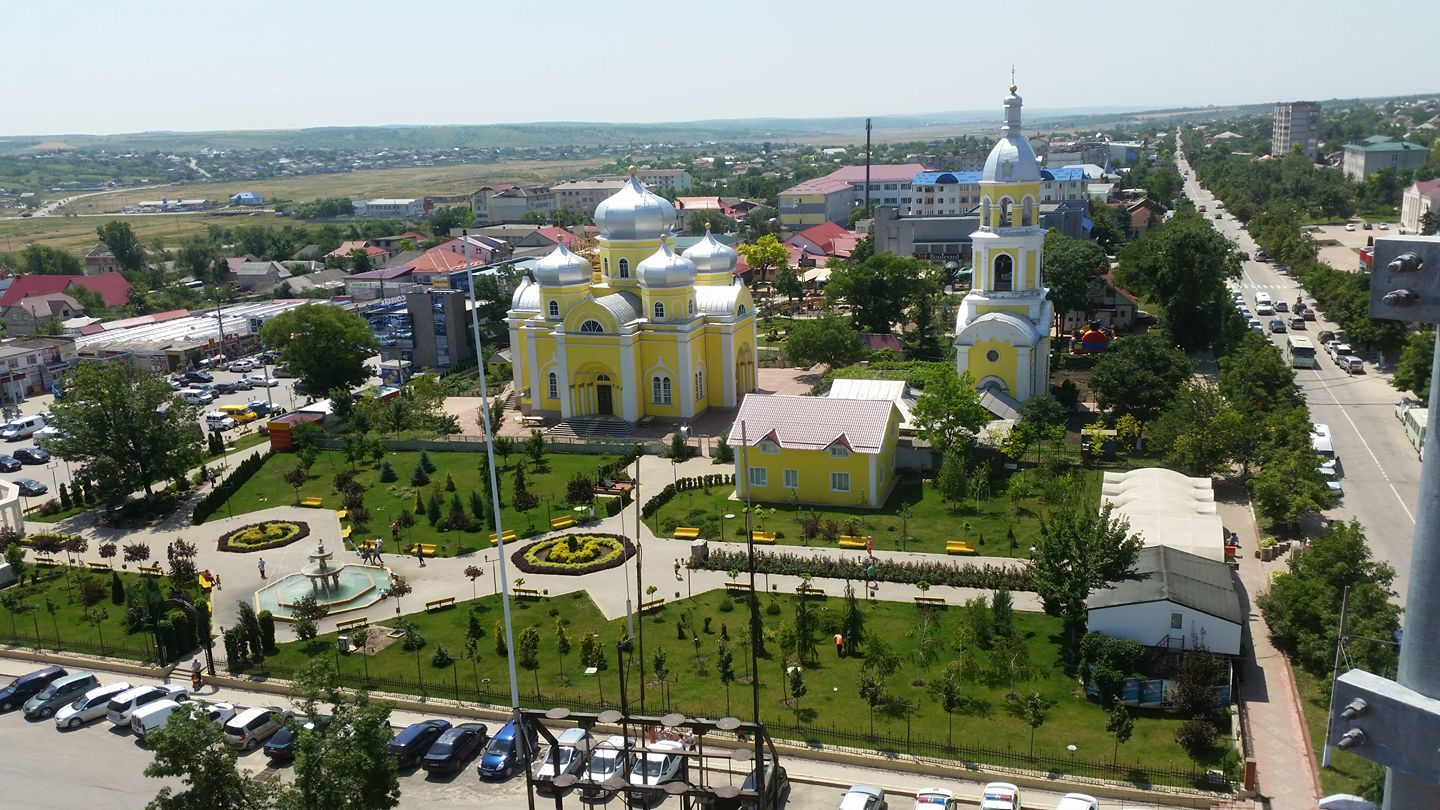
Comrat

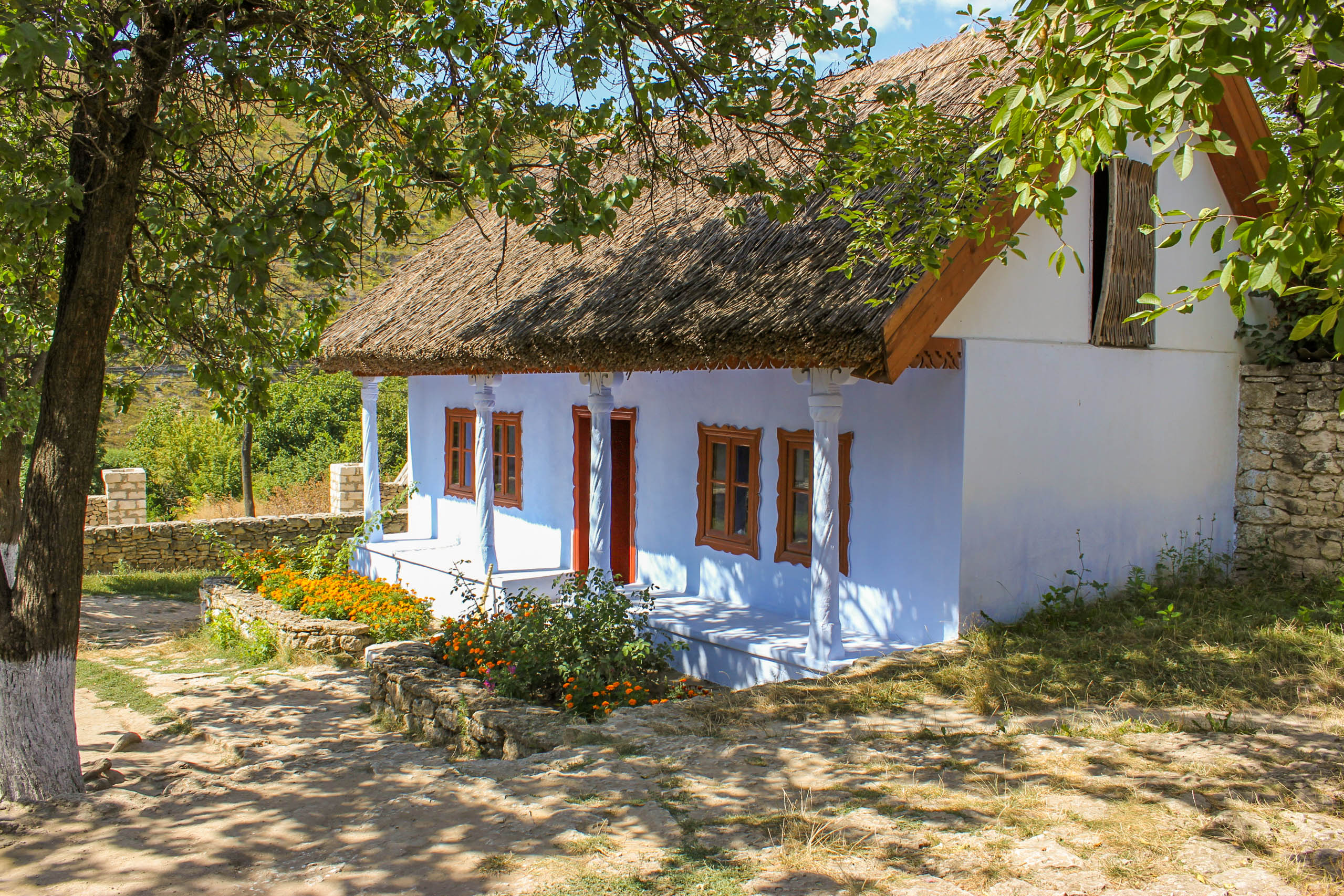
Museum in Trebujeni

== Statistics ==
In 2015, Moldova received 2.85 million visitors.

Yearly tourist arrivals in thousands

Tourists in Moldova by country of origin, 2015:

№	Country	Tourists
1	Romania	1 300 945
2	Ukraine	1 013 779
3	Russia	258 320
4	Bulgaria	47 831
5	Italy	32 884
6	Turkey	21 818
7	Israel	17 518
8	United States	17 133
9	Belarus	14 136
10	Portugal	9 576
	Total	2 856 089

Tourists in Moldova by country of origin, 2018:

№	Country	Tourists
1	Romania	2 524 403
2	Ukraine	1 069 066
3	Russia	322 256
4	Bulgaria	78 870
5	Italy	46 594
6	Germany	30 061
7	Israel	28 358
8	Turkey	25 936
9	United States	25 778
10	Belarus	20 039
	Total	4 334 215

== Climate ==
Local climate is moderately continental, winters are usually snowy and cold. The average temperature in January is −4 °C, in July +21 °C. The absolute recorded minimum has been -36 °C and the maximum +42 °C. But in fact, due to Climate Change, in recent years it can be +15 °C in mid January. Even during July or August the northern countryside remains moderately hot. Traditional Moldovan houses made of natural clay with straw (in Moldovan "lampach") provide cool conditions in the summer.

== Transport ==
Moldova is internationally connected by plane to Chișinău International Airport. Direct flights from and to many European destinations exist.

Chișinău is also internationally connected by rail. Direct overnight trains exist to Romania (one daily train to Bucharest), Ukraine (one daily train to Odesa), and Russia (one daily train via Kyiv to Moscow).

The main means of transportation in Moldova is the highway system. Since Moldova is a small country (450 km from south to north, 200 km from west to east) one may get around by taxi. Car rental is available in bigger cities. There are also national and international bus connections.

The Giurgiulești terminal on the Danube is compatible with small seagoing vessels. Shipping on the lower Prut and Nistru rivers plays only a modest role in the country's transportation system.

In Chișinău there is a public trolleybus system. Most cities also offer public transport in the form of Minibuses (rutierele in Moldovan Romanian; marshrutki in Russian).

== Telecommunication ==
As of September 2020, 4G mobile coverage covers 97% of the country, providing mobile internet speeds of up to 150 Mb/s.

Broadband internet speed reaches 65.76 Mb/s.

== Security ==
Officially, Moldova is in 59th place out of 133 countries in the security rating.

== Touristic Logo ==
In 2014, Moldova introduced a new tourism logo and along with the new slogan "Discover the routes of life". It was developed with USAID assistance.

== UNESCO World Heritage sites ==
- List of World Heritage Sites in Moldova

=== Intangible cultural heritage ===
- Cultural practices associated with 1 March
- The Christmas carols in masculine horde
- Traditional wall-carpet craftsmanship

== See also ==
- Extreme points of Moldova
- Medical tourism in the Republic of Moldova
- Moldovan cuisine
- Moldovan wine
