= Mansion of Manuc Bey =

- Conacul lui Manuc Bei
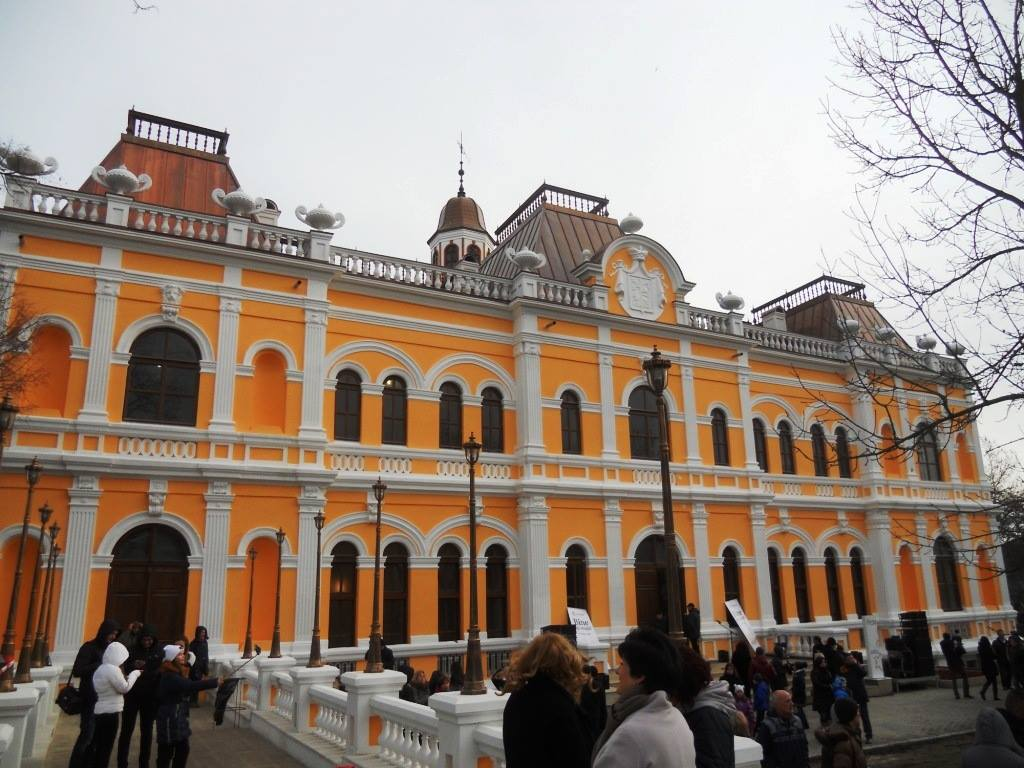
- The mansion of Manuc Bey

- Location within Moldova
- Alternative names: Complexul istorico-arhitectural Manuc Bey

General information
- Type: Mansion
- Architectural style: Neoclassical
- Location: Hânceşti, Moldova
- Coordinates: 46.825650°N 28.582141°E,
- Completed: 1958-1961
- Renovated: 2013-2015
- Owner: Manuc Bey

Website
- manucbey.md

The mansion of Manuc Bey (Romanian Conacul lui Manuc Bei or Manuc Bey, more rarely Conacul Mirzoian, officially: historical-architectural complex Manuc Bey, from Romanian Complexul istorico-arhitectural Manuc Bey) is a modern palace and is located in the city of Hânceşti in the central western part of Moldova. It was the residence of Manuc Bei. It consists of a larger building complex: Manucs Palace (Palatul Princiar), the Steward's House, the hunting lodge of Countess Çadır, a watch tower and other buildings.

== Location and structure ==
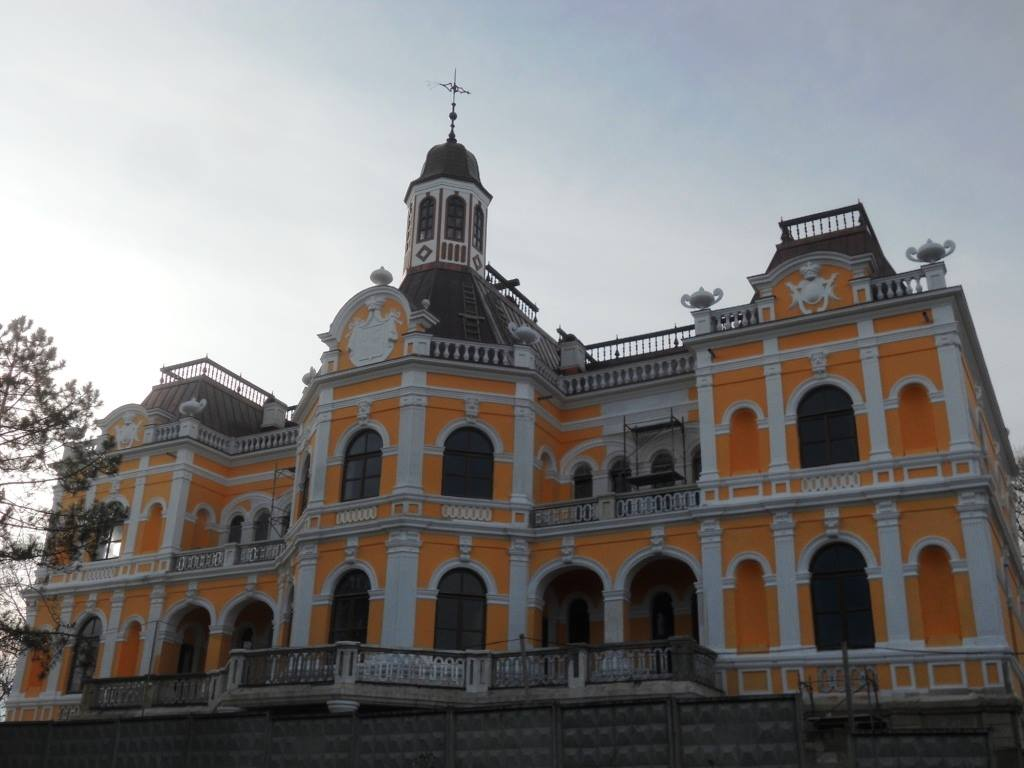
The renovated castle in December 2015

The palace is located in the southern part of the city on the northern slope of a hill on the edge of the park. An avenue leads from the entrance to the castle. Because of the slope of the site, you can only see two floors from above. The castle is designed in the spirit of French classicism with large windows and loggias. The inner walls to the terrace were decorated with frescoes and equipped with niches for statues. The niches were embellished with frescoes. The palace property was enclosed with a wall that was demolished in the late 1950s. All parts of the property are said to have been connected to the palace by glass galleries.

The ceilings were painted by the Armenian Hovhannes Aiwasjan, who was visiting his brother in Chișinău at the time. The paintings have not survived. Aivazyan later became famous as a marine painter under the name Ivan Aivazovsky.

== History ==
=== Construction in Bessarabian times ===
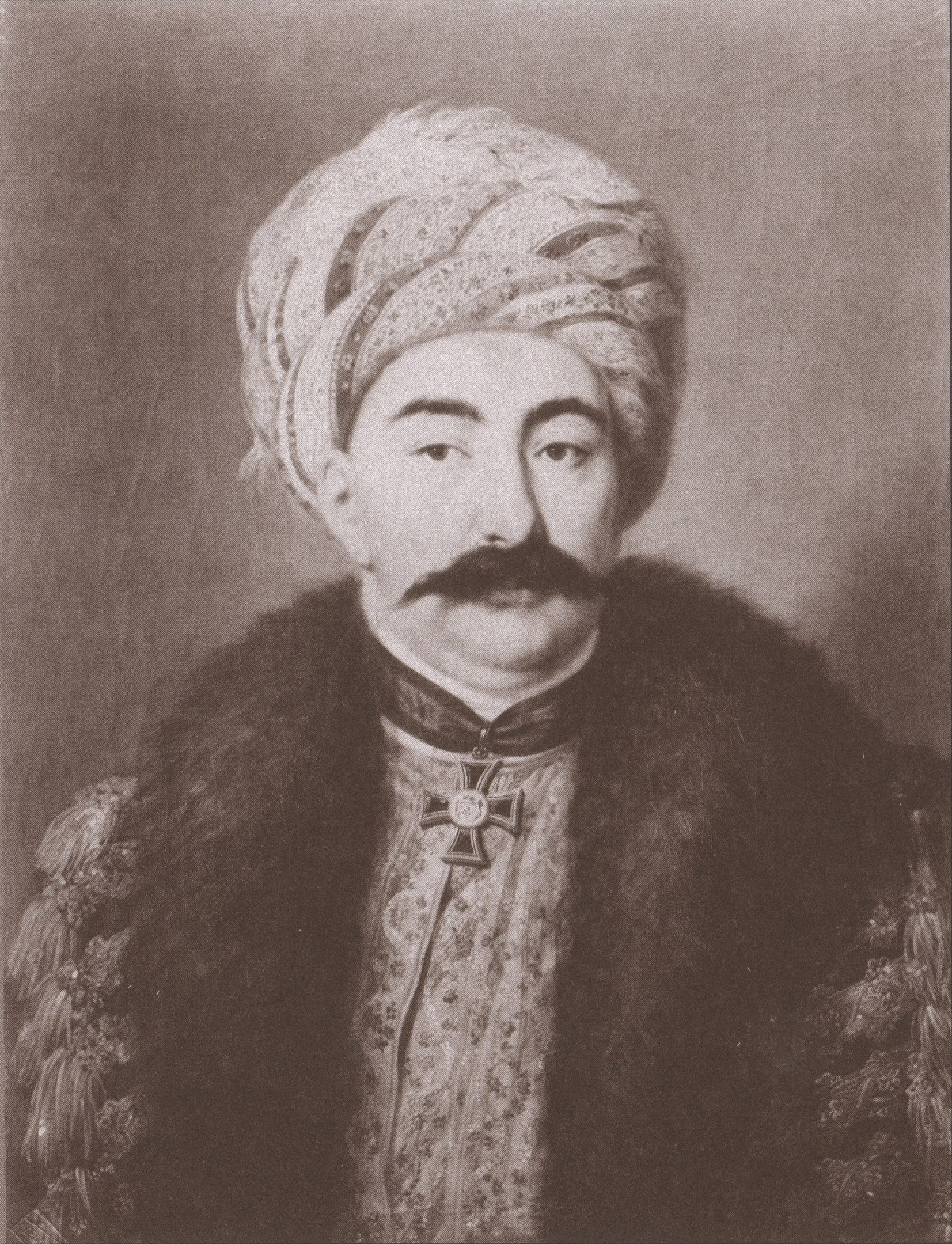
Manuc Bey (Emanuel Mârzayan) around 1810

After the end of the Russo-Turkish War of 1806–1812, the diplomat and trader of Armenian origin Manuc Bey left Bucharest and entrusted his confidants with the continuation of his business. He first moved to Sibiu and after 1815 to Chișinău in the Bessarabia Governorate of the then Russian Empire, where he acquired the Hancești estate for 300,000 golden lei. Manuc Bey died on June 20, 1817, after falling from a horse. According to another source, he was poisoned by Ottomans in an act of revenge. He is buried in the porch of the Armenian Church in Chișinău.

The construction of the manor house was started for his son Murat (Ivan), continued by him and finally completed by his nephew Grigore (Gregory) from 1858 to 1861. The successors built a French style castle with a winter garden, watchtowers and a large castle park. In 1881 the famous architect Alexander Bernardazzi designed and built the hunting lodge (also Castelul Vânătoresc). Alexander Pushkin is said to have visited the place in 1823 during his exile.

=== Soviet era ===
After the Second World War, the mansion was administered by Soviet authorities. At first the estate housed a mechanization school, then a polytechnic secondary school. The wall that enclosed the entire estate was demolished in the late 1950s. The architectural complex was still in a satisfactory condition until the mid-1980s. The 1986 Vrancea earthquake damaged the palace so deeply that the majority of the buildings were in danger of collapsing or in ruins. A new building was erected for the school and the castle began to deteriorate rapidly. The hunting lodge was largely preserved, as a regional ethnographic museum had been opened there since 1979.

=== Cultural monument of the Republic of Moldova ===
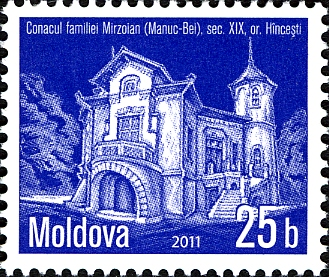
Countess Çadır's hunting lodge in the palace complex on a 2011 postage stamp

In 1993 the mansion got the status of a Moldovan cultural monument. In 2011 the estate was enclosed with a concrete wall, but it was still easy to penetrate the site. The palace was badly damaged, especially the facade. The same was true for the Steward's House and the Ioniță Iamandis house. At that time the architectural monument was just a landscape of ruins.

=== Redevelopment ===
In the early 1970s, the restoration of the hunting lodge began, which later became a historical and ethnographic museum. It has over 20,000 exhibits in several rooms, each dedicated to different topics. On the ground floor there are objects from the age of the Moldavian SSR, some things about Grigory Kotovsky, but also traditional costumes from the Middle Ages.

In 2012 the further deterioration was stopped with roofing work. In October 2013, funding for the restoration and refurbishment of the entire historical complex was secured. The project was implemented in 2014 and 2015 and included a total of nine buildings in the renovation: the two-story palace, the countess's building, the hunting lodge, the steward's house, the watchtower, the Armenian church, the artesian well, the stables and the underground galleries.

The restoration have been carried out based on the original drawings and sketches found in Saint Petersburg. The European Union provided just under 2.2 million euros for the renovation, with a further 10% being self-financed by the Hînceşti District Council. The Agency for Regional Development of the Center of the Republic of Moldova is to provide 23.5 million lei for the renovation of two other buildings in the Manuc Bey complex: Casa Ioniță Iamandi and Casa Vechilului.

The interior, which has been partially restored, is based on the more baroque interior of the old furnishings of Manuc Bey's family. Only about 3 hectares have been preserved from the old castle park, which formerly covered almost 10 hectares. The main entrance to the palace had been an earlier entrance in the enclosure from the east.

=== Gallery ===
The complex before renovation

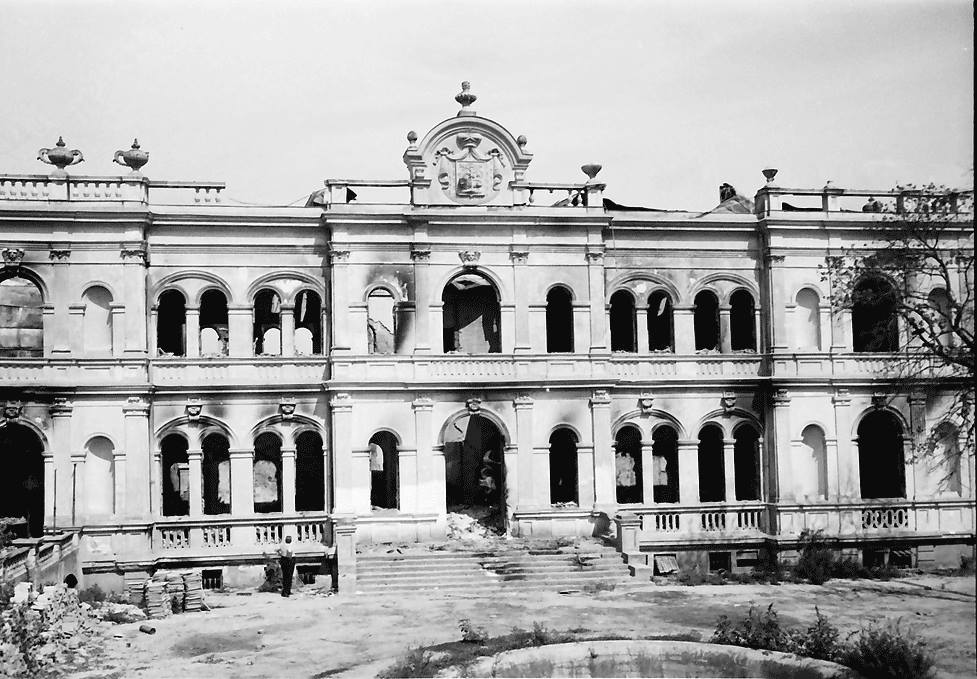
The palace in 1945

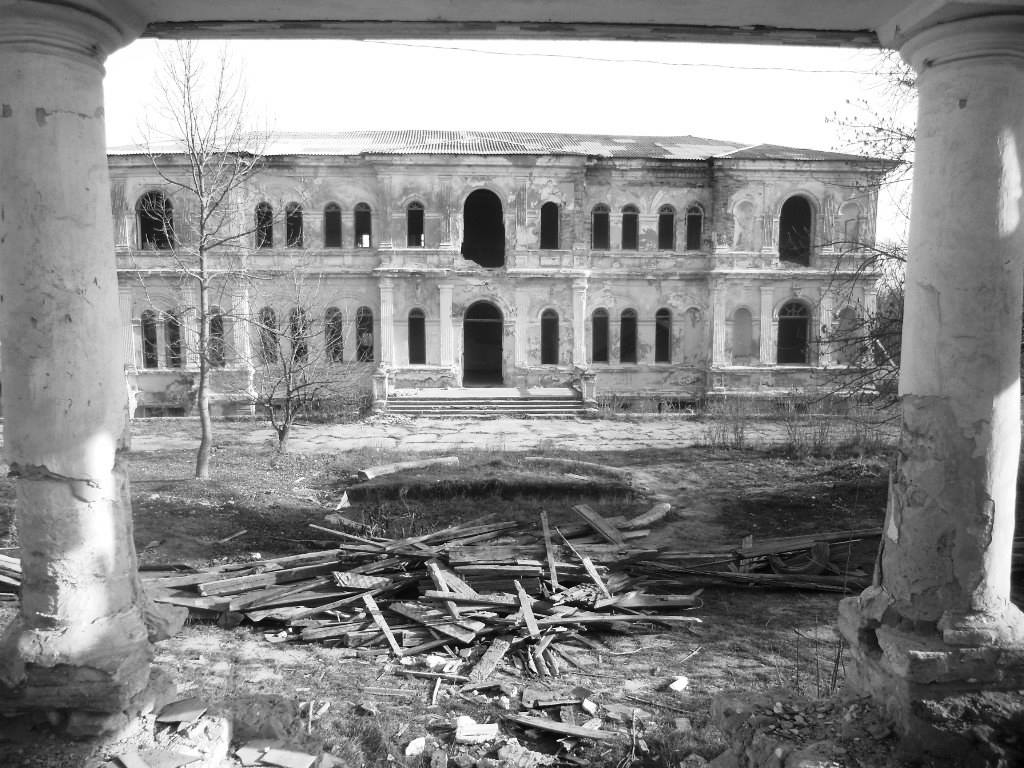
The palace before renovation in 2013

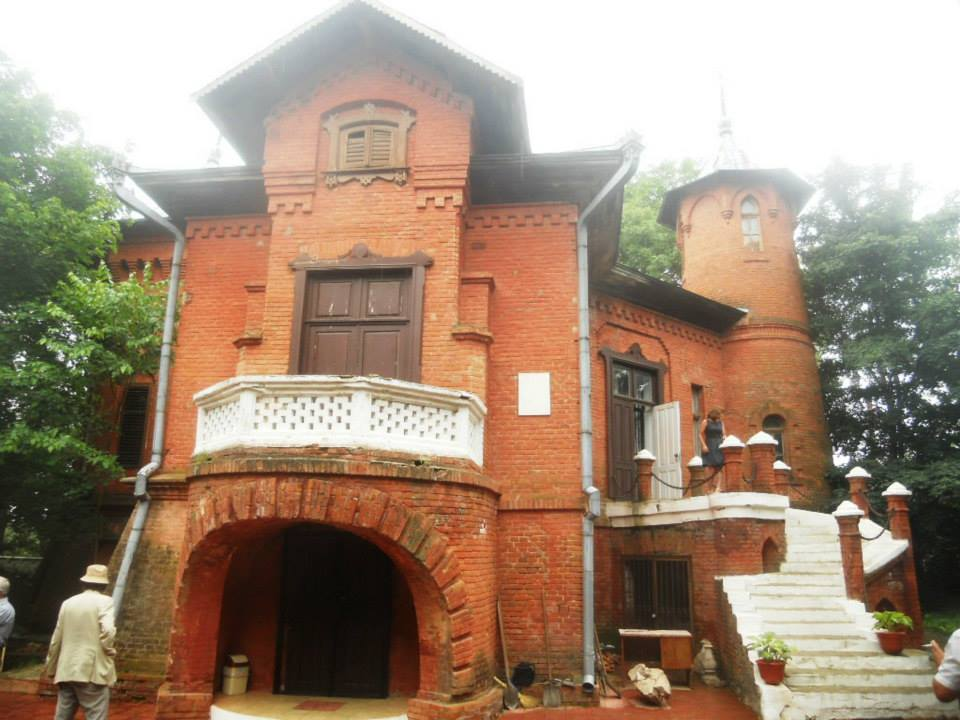
The hunting lodge in 2013

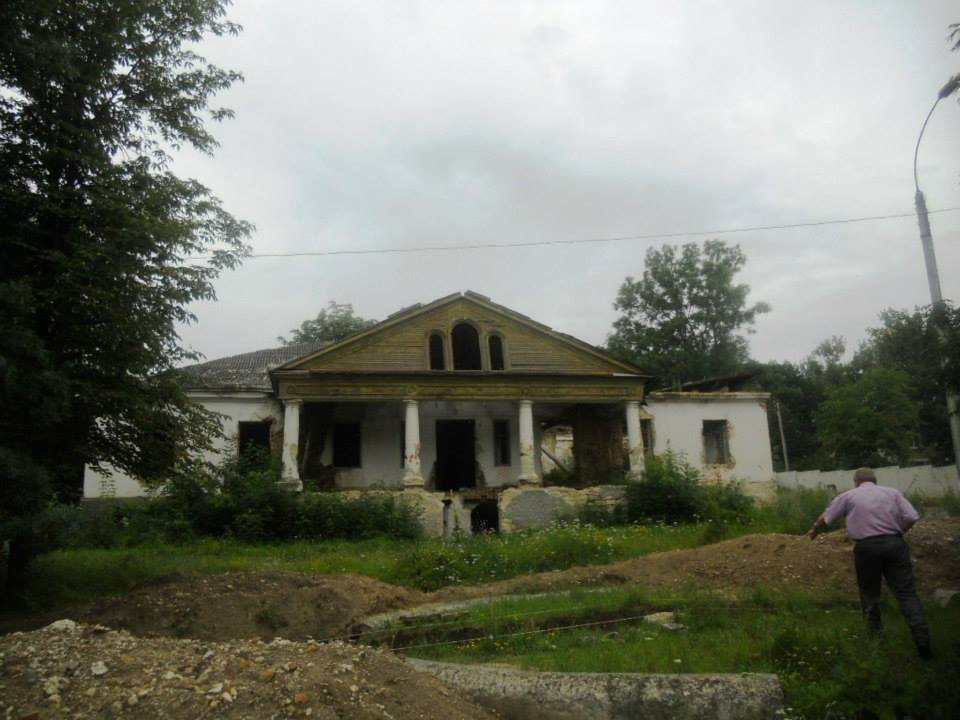
Ioniță Iamandi's House in 2013

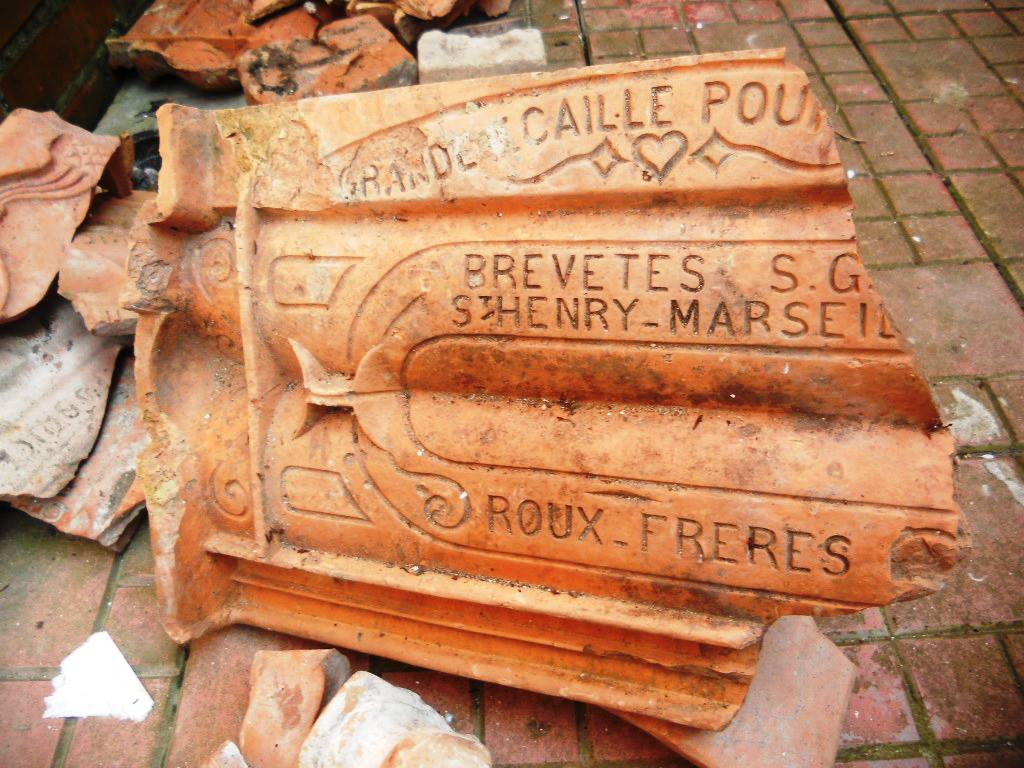
The roof tiles originally came from France

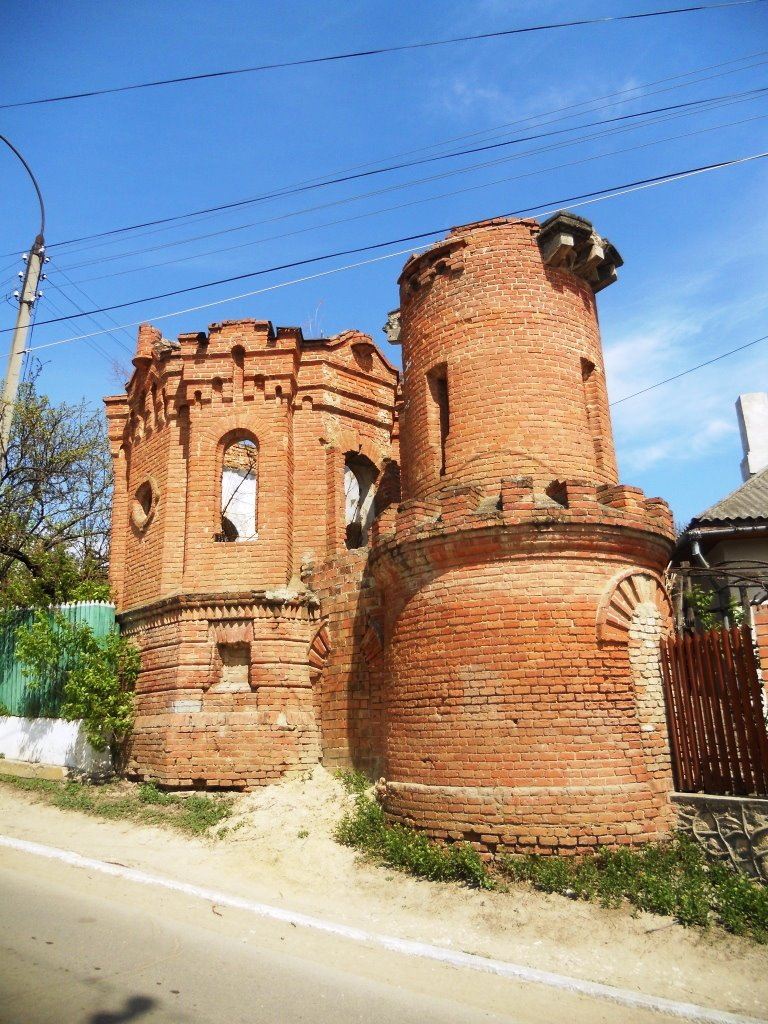
Watchtower's ruins in 2012
The complex after renovation

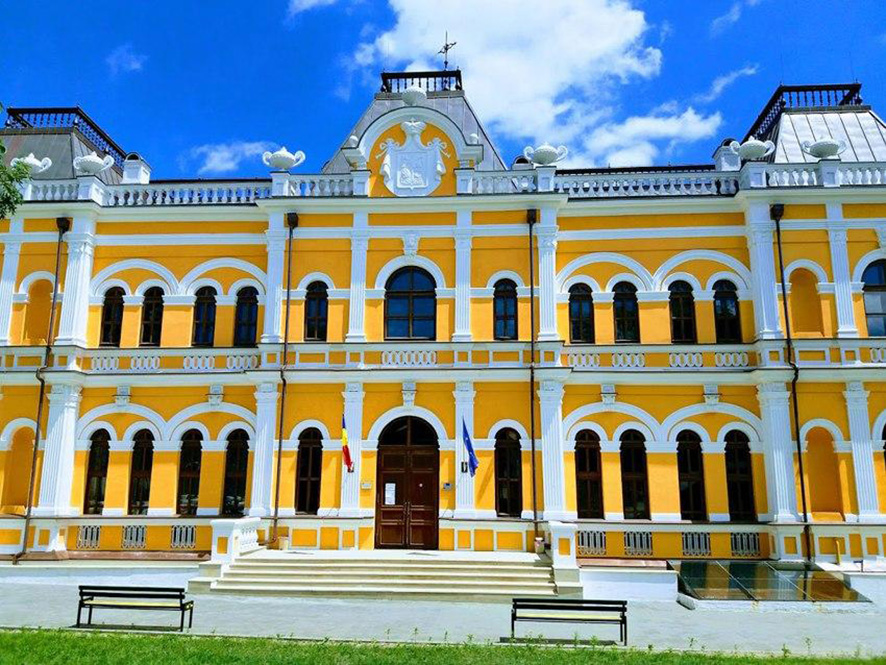
The renovated facade in 2020

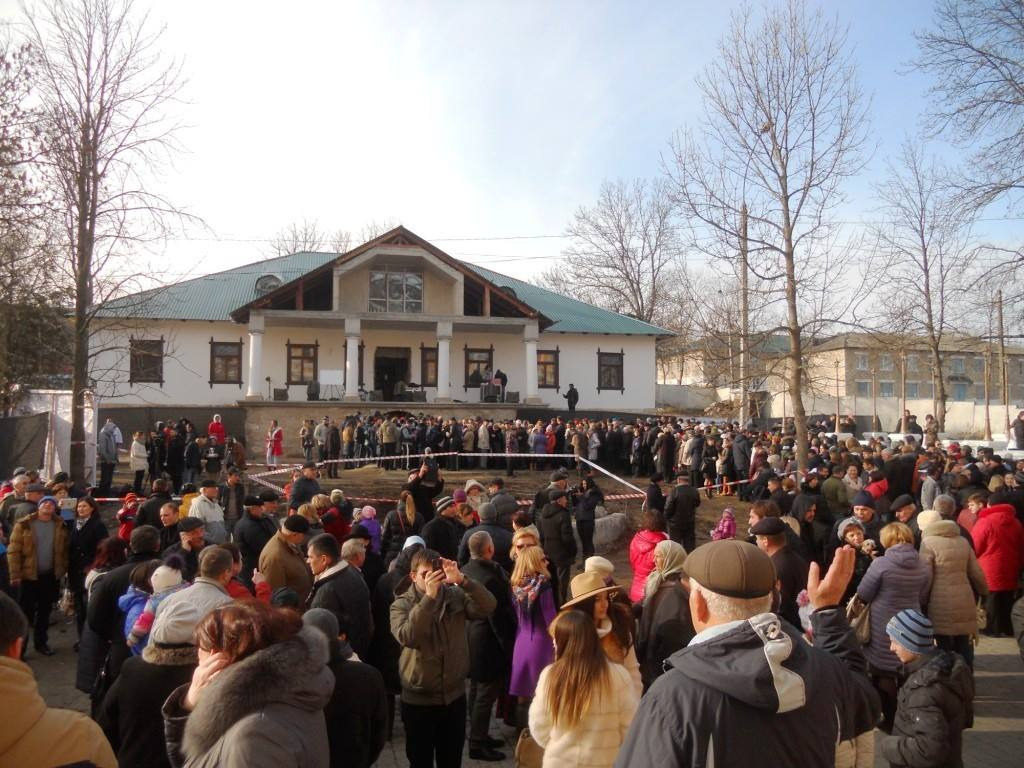
Reopening and Open Day December 2015

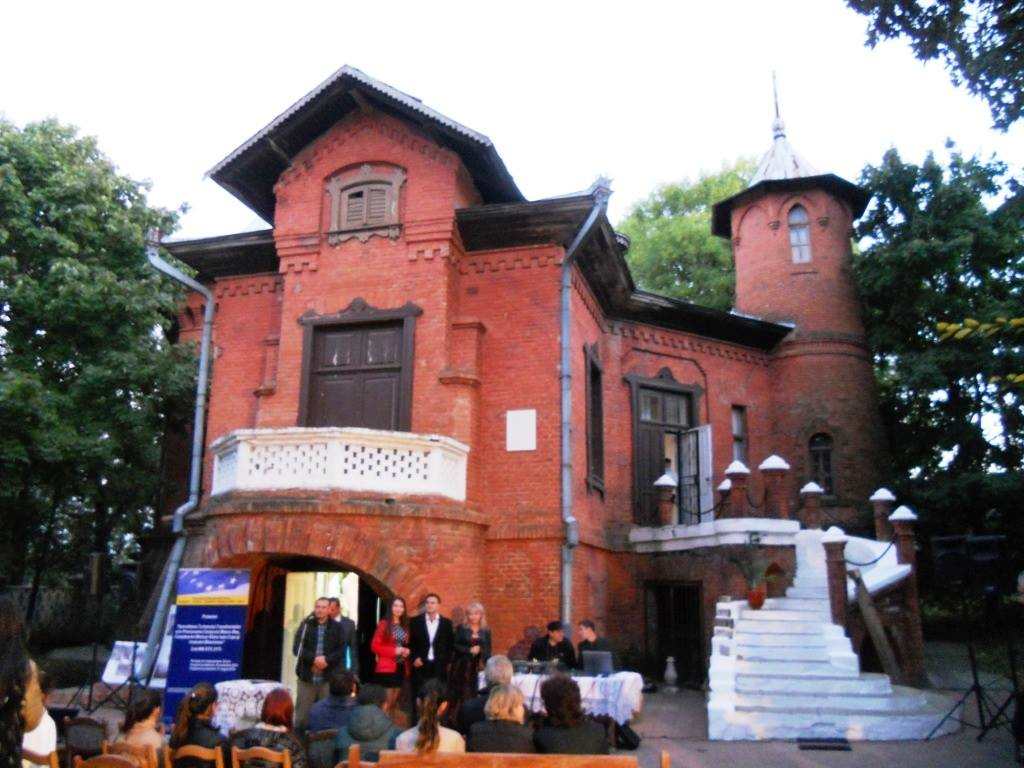
The restorated hunting lodge in 2014

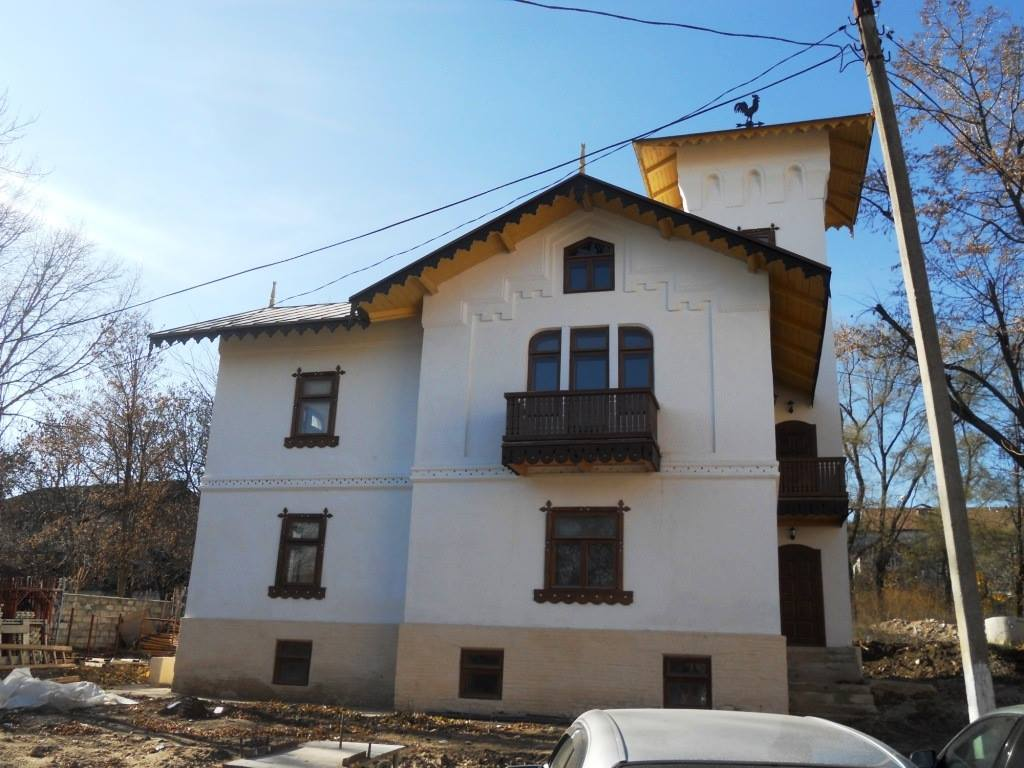
The Steward's House in November 2015

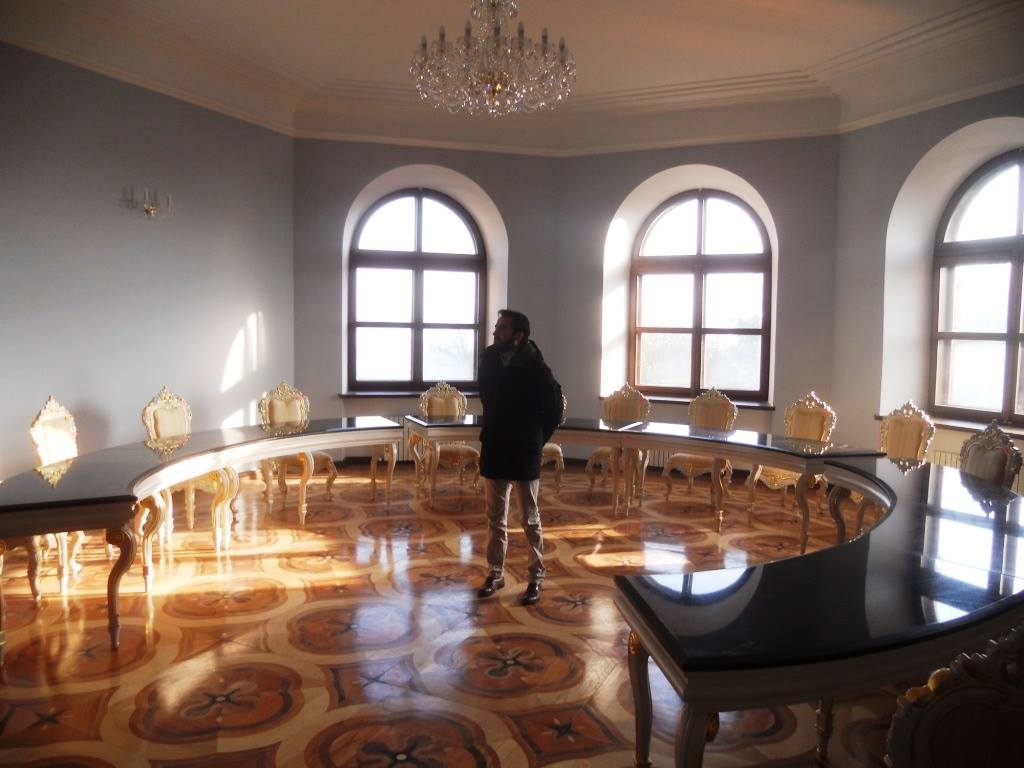
Restored interior in October 2016

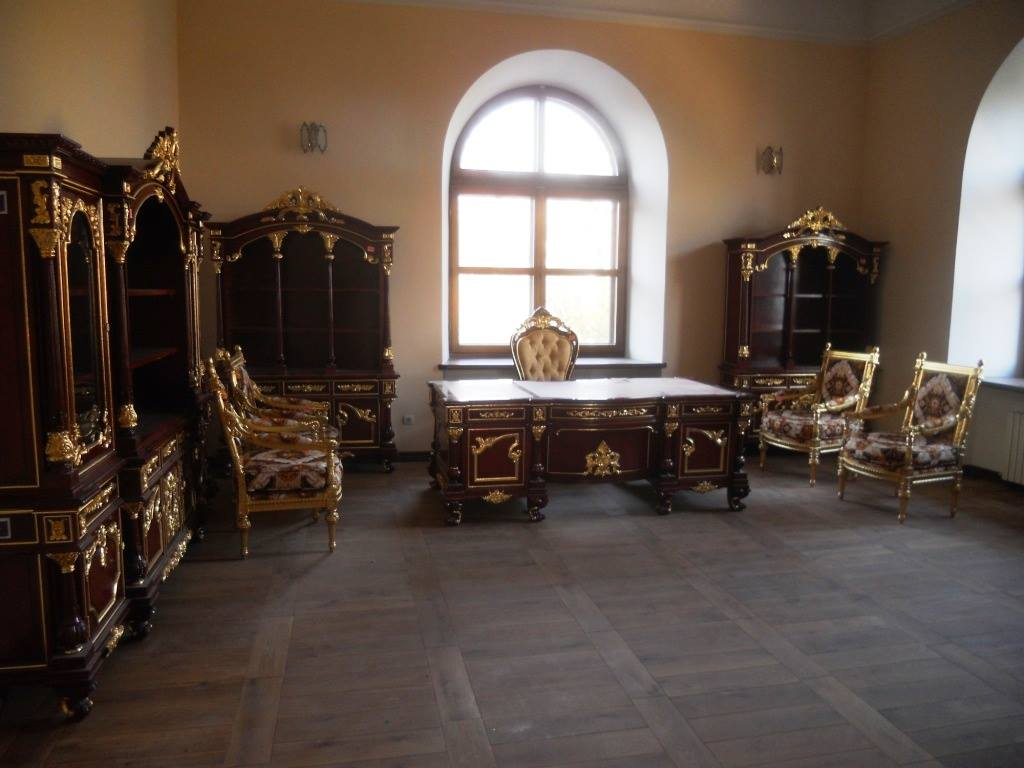
Parts of the new interior

== See also ==
- Hanul Manuc – Manuc's Inn in Bucharest, Romania.
- Mimi Castle, another mansion in the central part of Moldova.

== Bibliography ==
- Frieder Monzer, Timo Ulrichs: Anwesen des Manuc Bey. In: Moldova: Mit Chișinău, ganz Bessarabien und Transdnestrien (3. Auflage), Trescher Verlag, Berlin 2020, ISBN 978-3-89794-455-8. p. 171
