= Ciuflea Monastery =

Moldovan Orthodox monastery

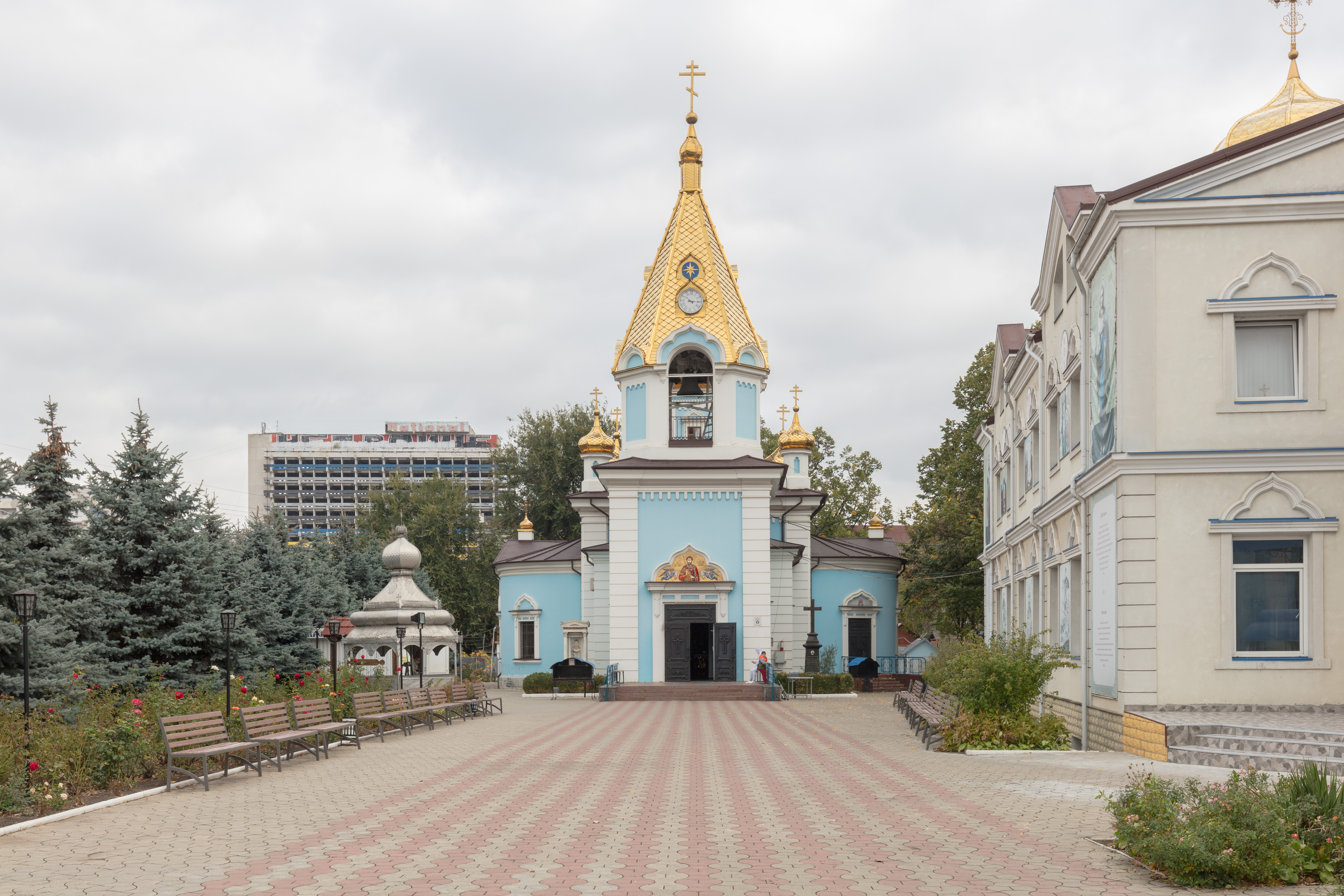

Religion
- Affiliation: Moldovan Orthodox Church
- Region: Chișinău
- Ecclesiastical or organizational status: monastery
- Year consecrated: June 6, 1858
- Status: Active

Location
- Location: Str. Ciuflea nr.1
- State: Moldova
- Interactive map of Ciuflea Monastery
- Coordinates: 47.012634°N 28.846915°E

Architecture
- Architect: N. Golikov
- Type: Russo-Byzantine

Website
- http://ciuflea.md/

Ciuflea Monastery (Romanian: Mănăstirea Ciuflea) is a Moldovan Orthodox monastery located in Chișinău, Moldova. It is dedicated to Saint Theodore of Amasea.

== History ==
The monastery was financed by Anastase Ciufli (1801 - 1870) to respect the last will of his brother Teodor Ciufli (1796 - 1854). The two brothers were Aromanian merchants who emigrated from Macedonia to Bessarabia in 1821. Anastase was authorised to start the construction of the church for his brother in 1854, it was finally consecrated on June 6, 1858. Teodor's remains were placed in the south wing of the building, his brother eventually joined him in their final resting place after his own death 11 years later.

In 1962, many churches of the Moldavian SSR were closed or their purpose changed. The main church of Chișinău, the Nativity Cathedral suffered the same fate by being transformed into an exhibition building. Thus the head of Moldova Church had to be moved to the then monastery of Ciuflea, which was granted of the status of cathedral and renamed according to its benefactor. In 2002, about a decade after the breakup of the Soviet Union, it became a monastery.

== Sources ==
- Starostenco, Petru (2009). Centrul istoric al Chișinăului, la începutul secolului al XXI-lea. Chișinău: Editura Arc. ISBN 978-9975-61-599-0.
- Catedrala episcopală Sf. Teodor Tiron

=== Gallery ===
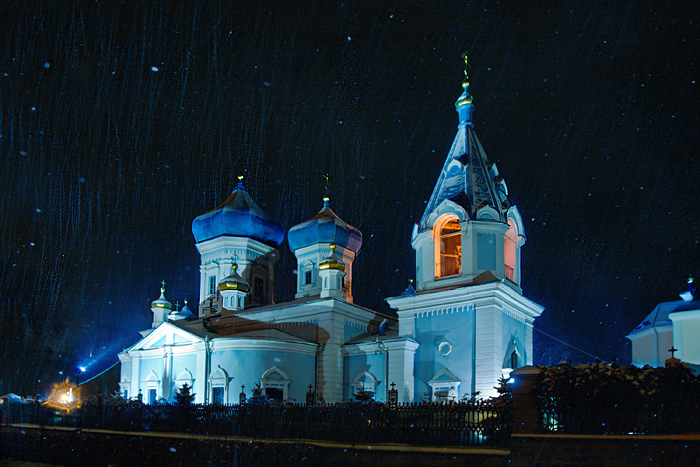
The monastery at night

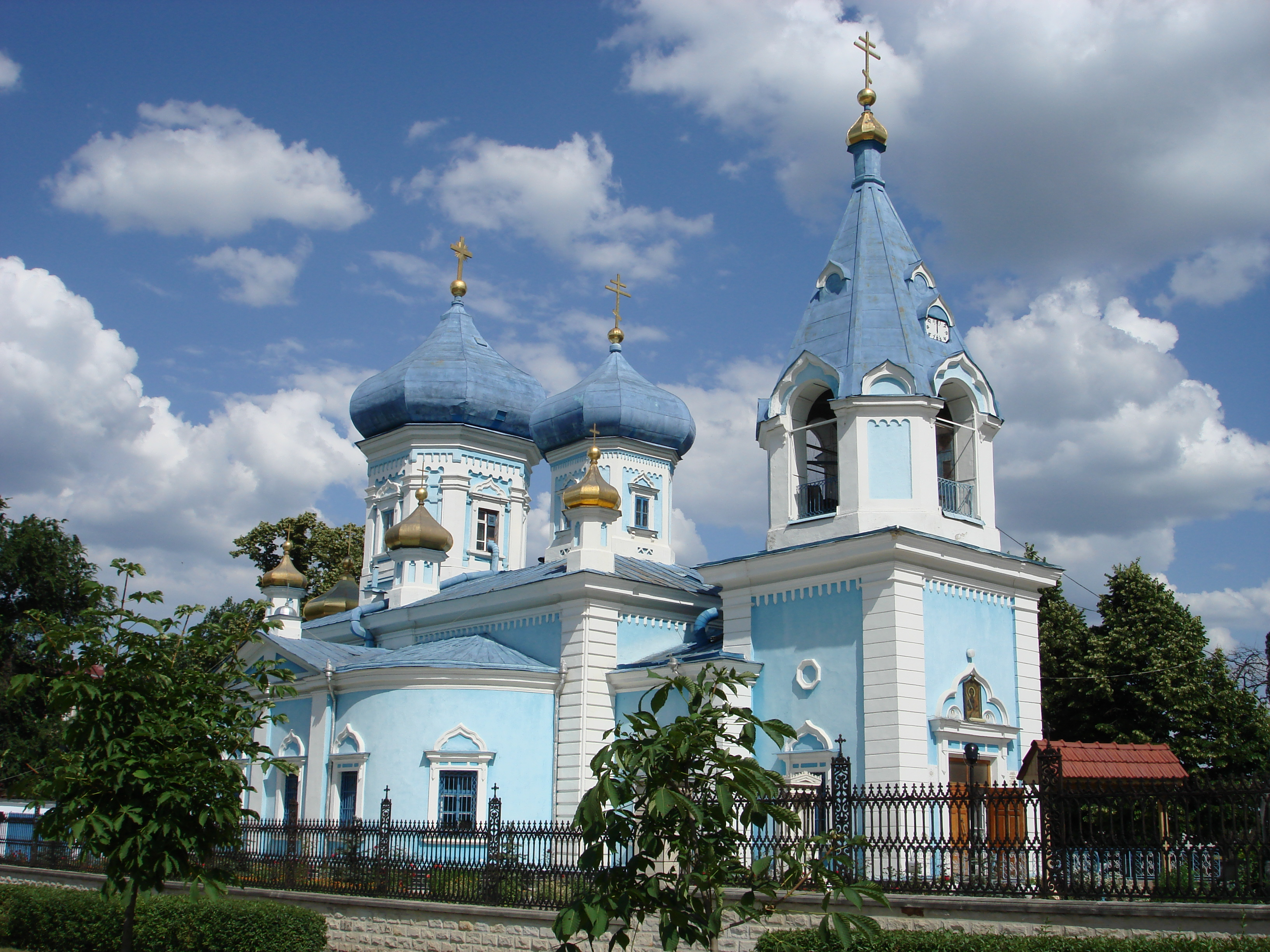
Exterior

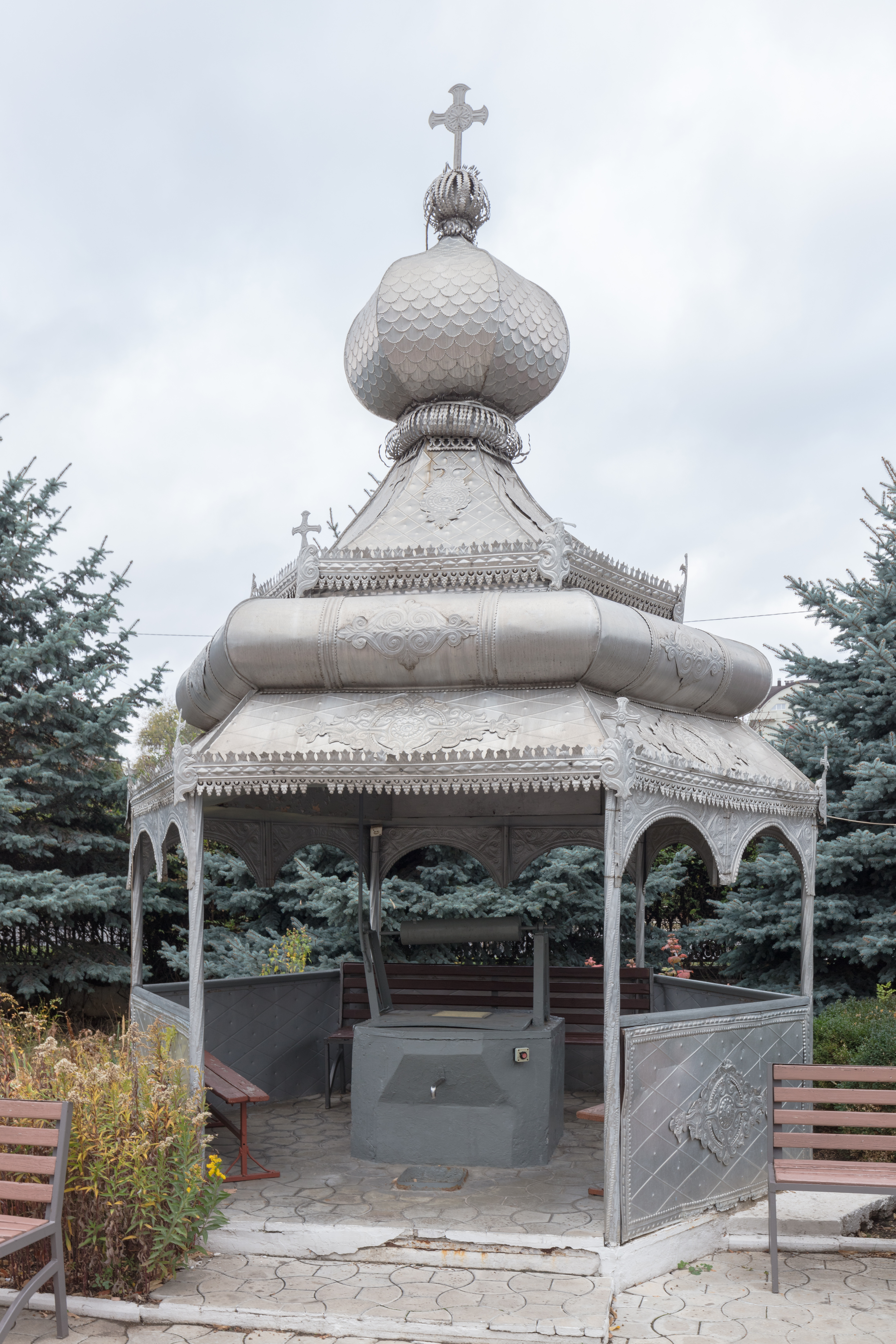
Well

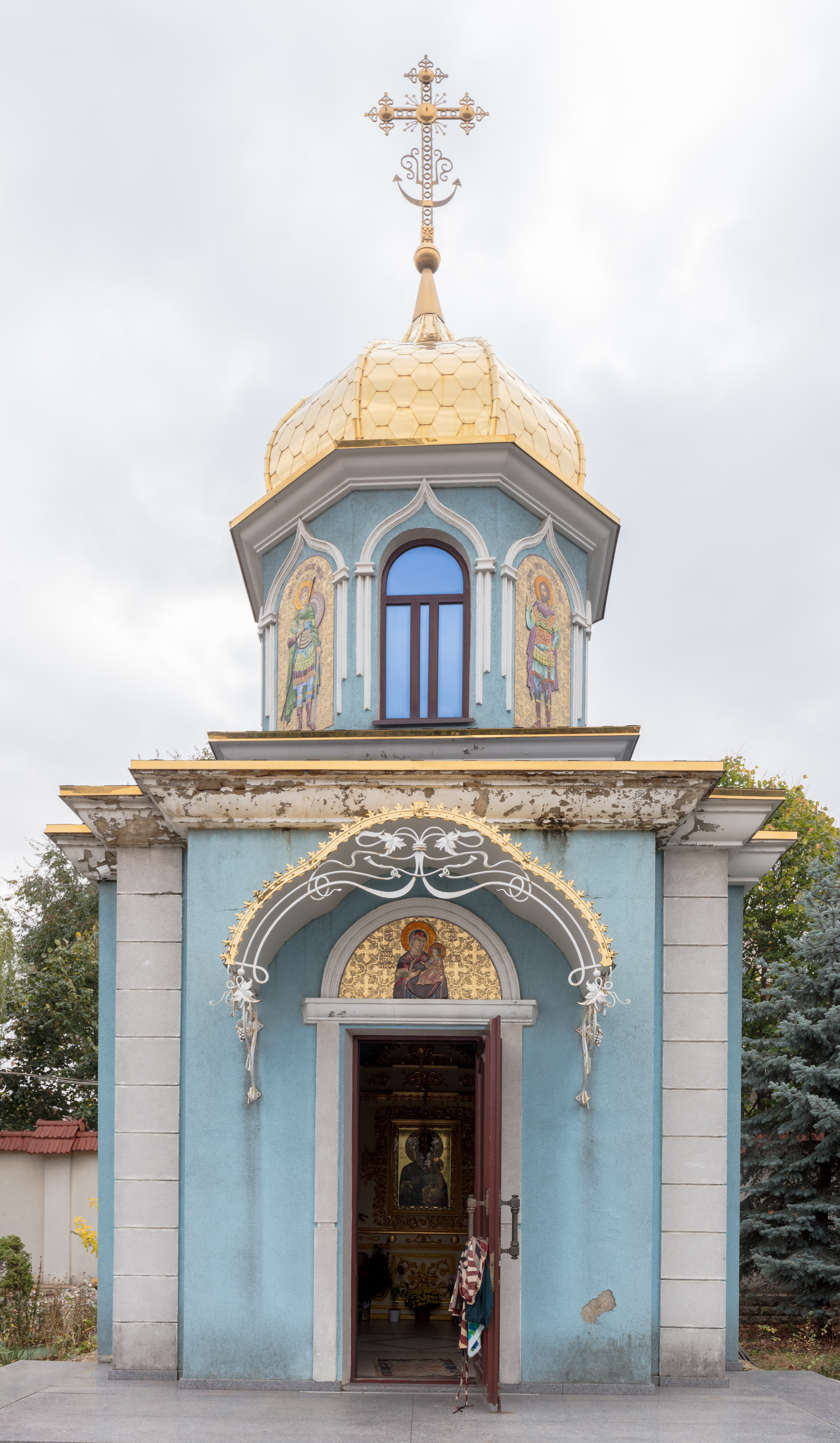
Chapel

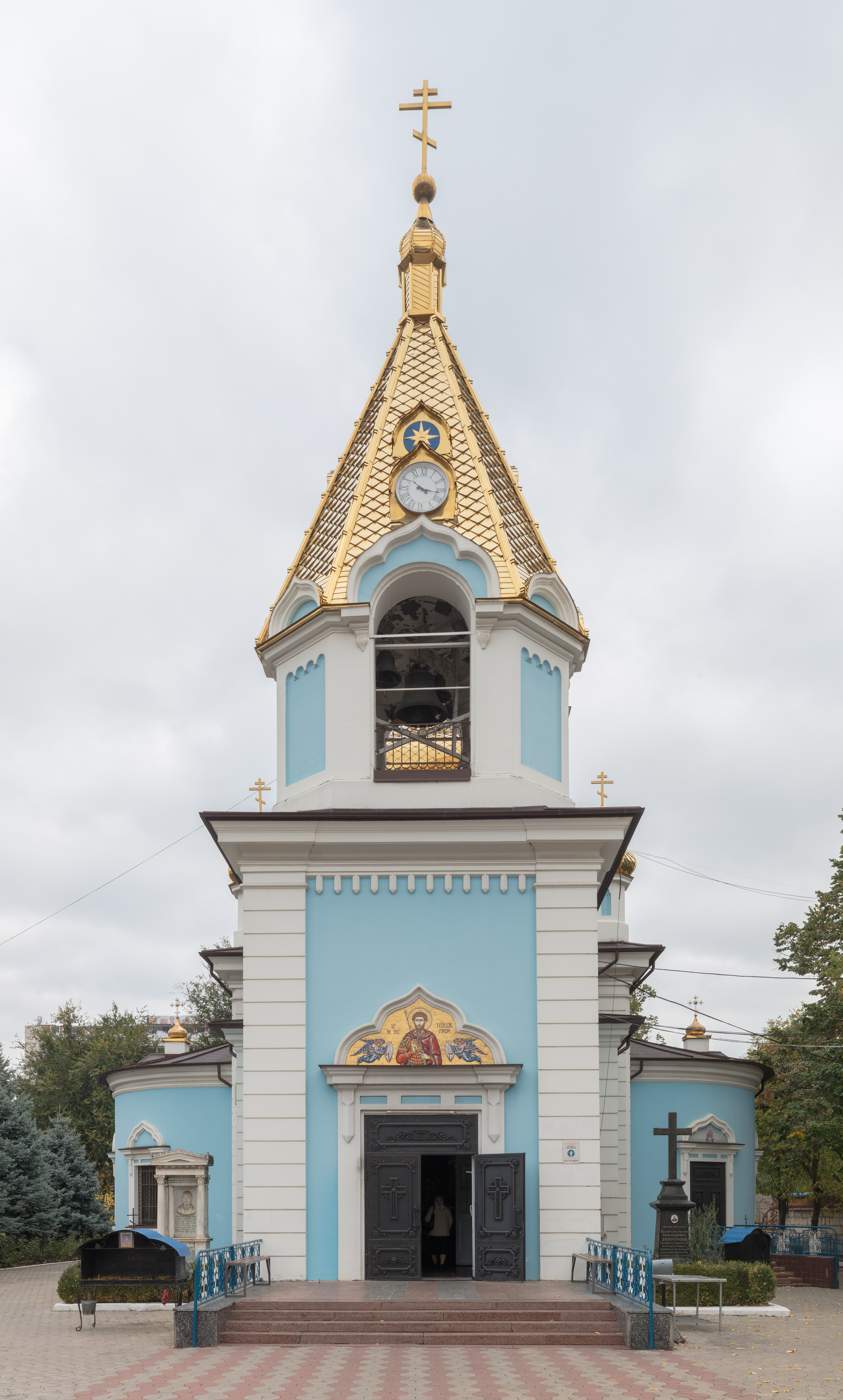
Entrance

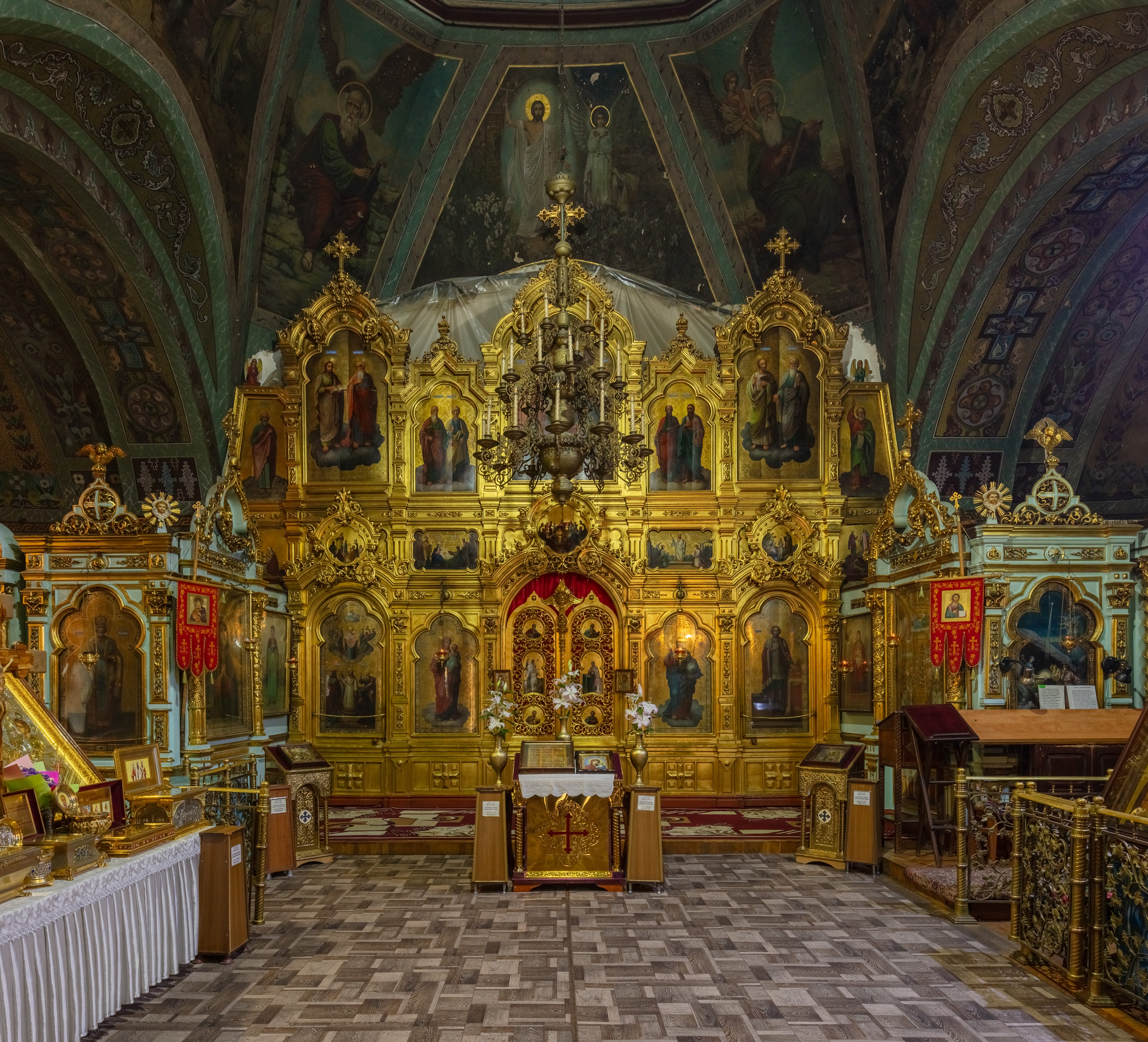
Interior
