= Strășeni District =

Moldovan subdivision

Coordinates: 47°10′N 28°35′E

Strășeni
- District (Raion)
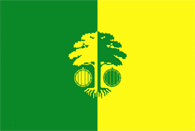
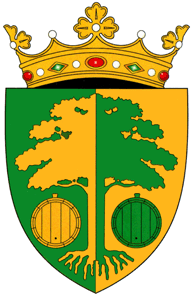
- Flag Coat of arms

- Country: Republic of Moldova
- Administrative center (Oraș-reședință): Strășeni
- Established: 2002

Government
  - Raion President: Mariana Dîmcenco (PAS, 2023)

Area
  - Total: 729.1 km^{2} (281.5 sq mi)

Population (2024)
  - Total: 61,362
  - Density: 84.16/km^{2} (218.0/sq mi)
- Time zone: UTC+2 (EET)
  - Summer (DST): UTC+3 (EEST)
- Area code: +373 37
- Car plates: ST
- Website: www.straseni.md

Strășeni (pronunciation: [strəˈʃenʲ]) is an administrative district and the largest city (Romanian: raion) in the central part of Moldova. The other principal town is Bucovăț, 26 km (16 mi) to the north of the Moldovan capital. Barring these two towns, the district is divided between rural communities. According to the 2024 Moldovan census, Strășeni's population stands at 61,362.

== History ==
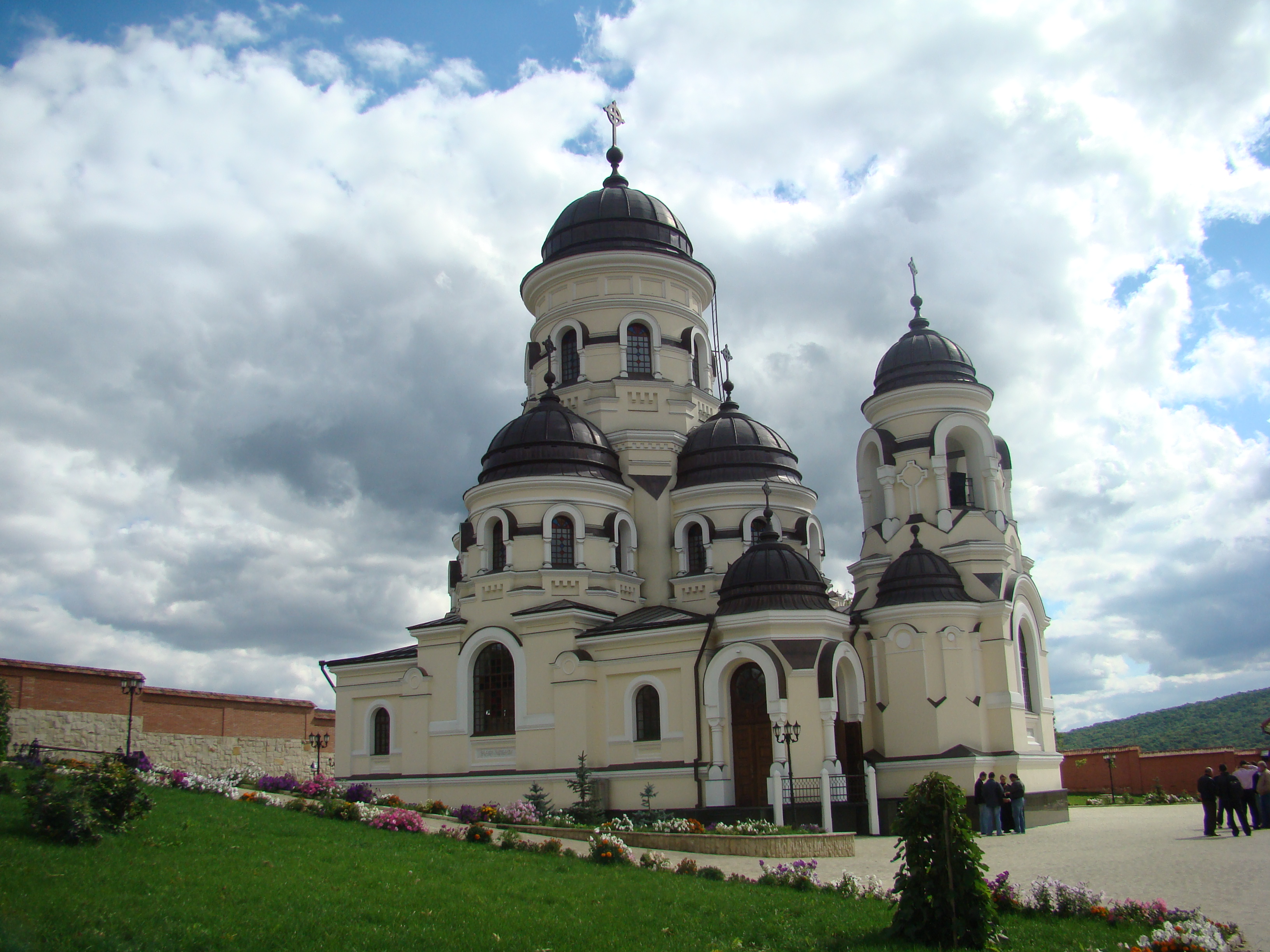
Căpriana monastery, one of the most oldest monasteries in Moldova

The territory of the district has been inhabited since the Stone Age, from 30,000–20,000 BC. The localities with the oldest attestation are Căpriana, Dolna, Lozova and Vorniceni, which were first attested in 1420. In 1429, the Căpriana monastery received the status of monastery. The present territory of the district was part of the historic counties of Lăpușna and Orhei, the boundary of which was on the Bîc River. In the 16th–18th centuries, the district developed both economically (trade, agriculture, and forestry) and culturally, with monasteries and churches being built, as there had been a major increase in population. In 1812, after the Russo-Turkish War, the district was part of the occupation of Bessarabia by the Russian Empire from 1812 to 1917, and there was an intense Russification of the native population. In 1918 after the collapse of the Russian Empire, Bessarabia united with Romania, during which (1918–1940, 1941–1944), the district was part of Chișinău County. In 1940 after Molotov–Ribbentrop Treaty, the region was occupied by the USSR. In 1991, as a result of the proclamation of Independence of Moldova, it became a part of Chișinău County (1991–2003), and in 2003 it became an administrative unit of Moldova.

== Geography ==
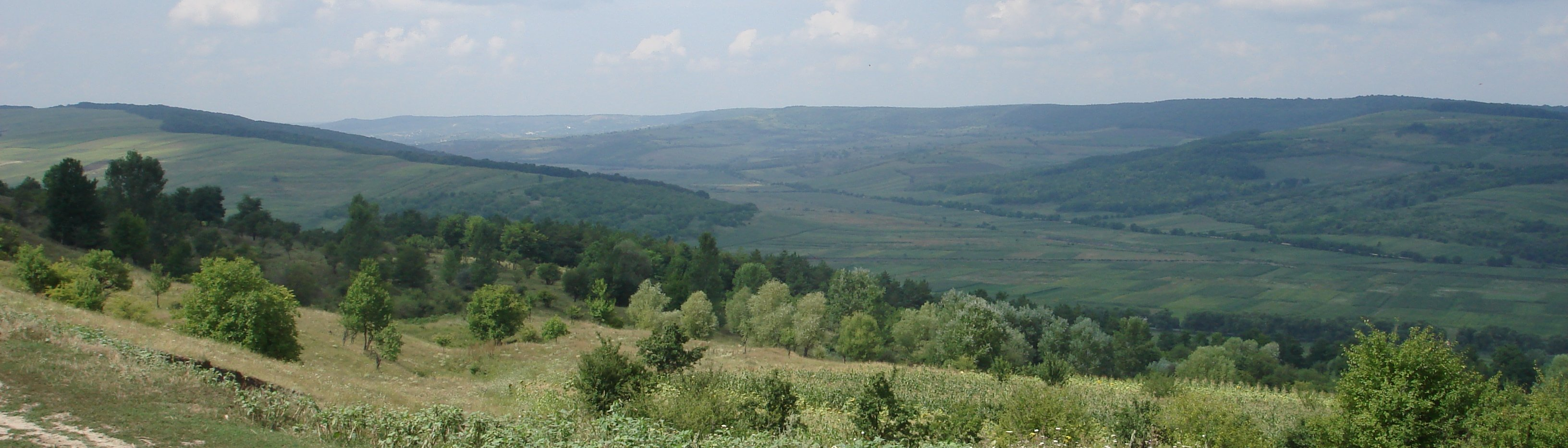
Landscape of Codri in the district

Strășeni district is located in central Moldova. The neighboring districts are Călărași District to the north-west, Orhei District to the north-east, Criuleni District to the east, the municipality of Chișinău, Ialoveni District and Hîncești District in the south, and Nisporeni District in the west. The district is located on the Central Moldavian Plateau, and in the Codri forest. The terrain is hilly, sloping from northwest to southeast, and cut by valleys and rivers. Erosion processes occur with high intensity. The soil is mainly brown soil forest and gray soil.

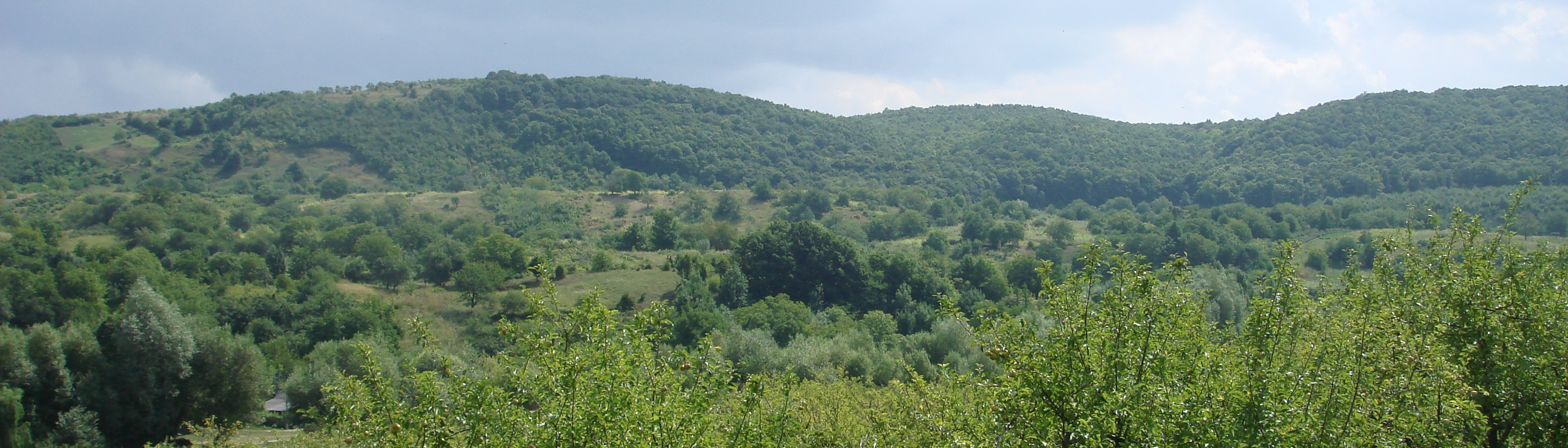
Central Moldavian Plateau

=== Fauna ===
The fauna are typical of central Europe, with the presence of mammals such as the fox, wild boar, deer, hedgehogs, wild cat, red deer, wolf, raccoon dog, and ferret. Birds include the hawk, crow, stork, eagles, and egrets. In the past, the forests were populated with brown bears, elk, and wisent, which have disappeared due to excessive hunting and deforestation.

=== Flora ===
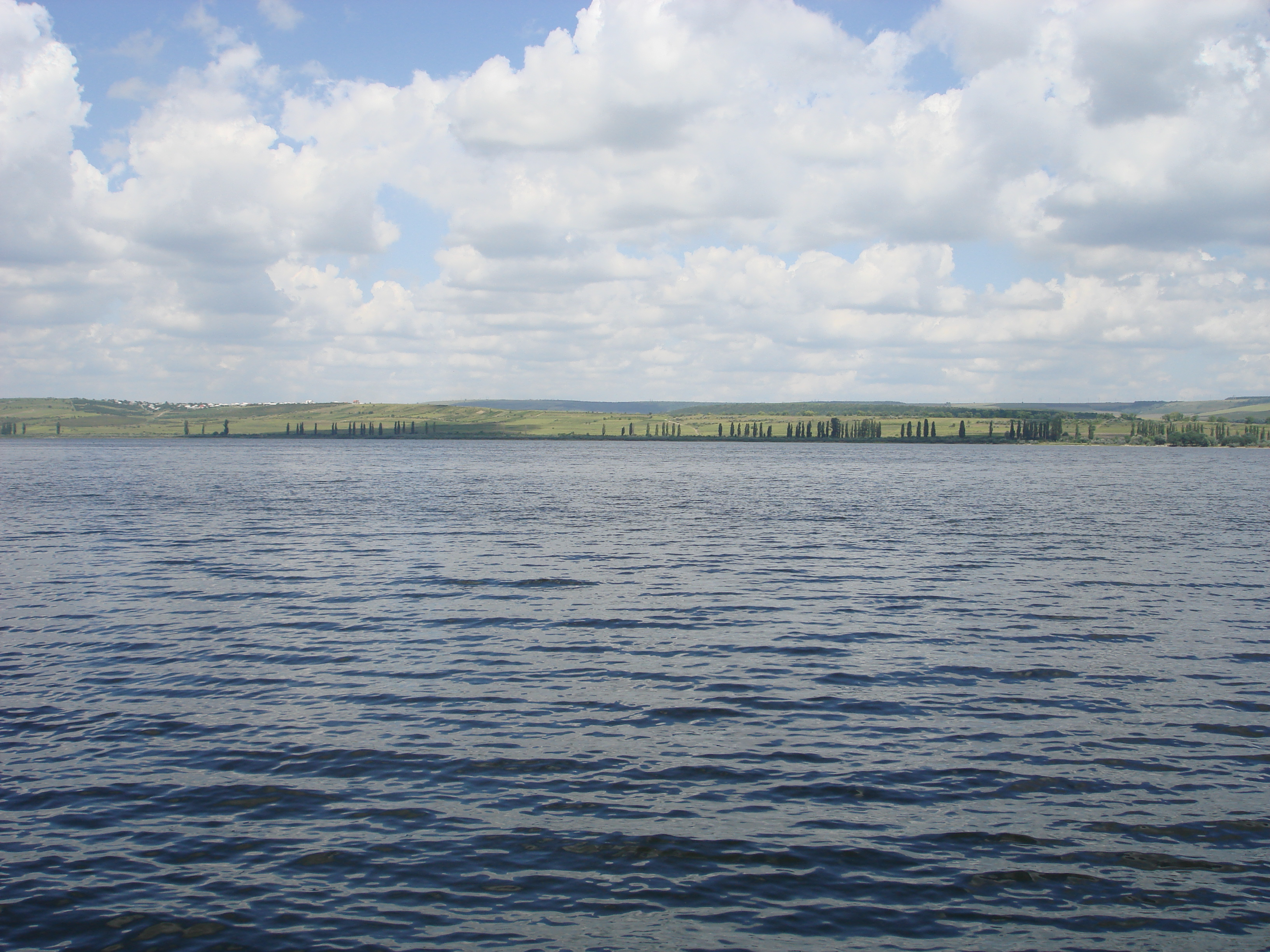
Ghidighici Reservoir

Forests occupy 36.6% of the district, and are characterized by the presence of oak, beech, hornbeam, maple, ash, and lime trees. Common plants include clover, bell, and nettle.

=== Rivers ===
The district is located in the Nistru (Dniester) river basin. The main tributaries that cross the district are the Ichel (102 km, 63 miles) and the Bîc (152 km, 94 miles). Most lakes in the district have a natural origin, but the largest is the man-made Ghidighici Reservoir.

== Subdivisions ==
There are 39 localities in the district. The cities are Bucovăț and the administrative center of Strășeni. Additionally, there are 12 villages and 25 communes.

== Demographics ==
As of the 2024 Census, the district population was 61,362, of which 24.0% was urban and 76.0% was rural.

=== Ethnic groups ===
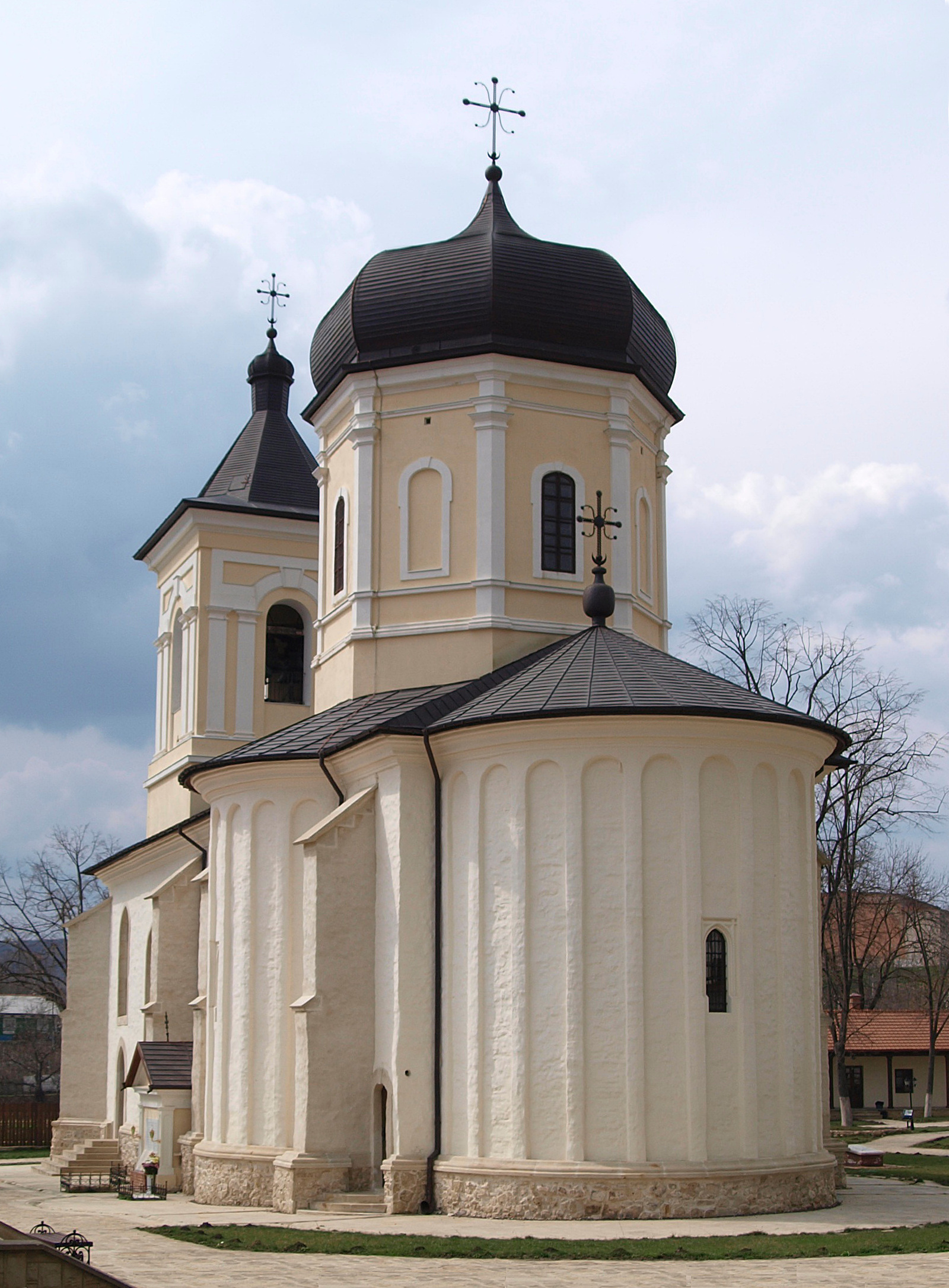
Old Princely Church (Căpriana monastery), built between 1491 and 1496 by Stephen the Great

Ethnic group	% of total
Moldovans*	86.9
Romanians*	11.3
Russians	0.6
Ukrainians	0.7
Gagauz	0.1
Bulgarians	0.1
Other	0.1
Undeclared	0.1

Footnote: *There is an ongoing controversy regarding the ethnic identification of Moldovans and Romanians.

=== Religion ===
- Christians – 99.1%
  - Orthodox Christians – 96.9%
  - Protestant – 2.1%
- Muslims - 0.1%
- Other – 0.1%
- No religion – 0.4%
- Not Declared - 0.4%

== Economy ==
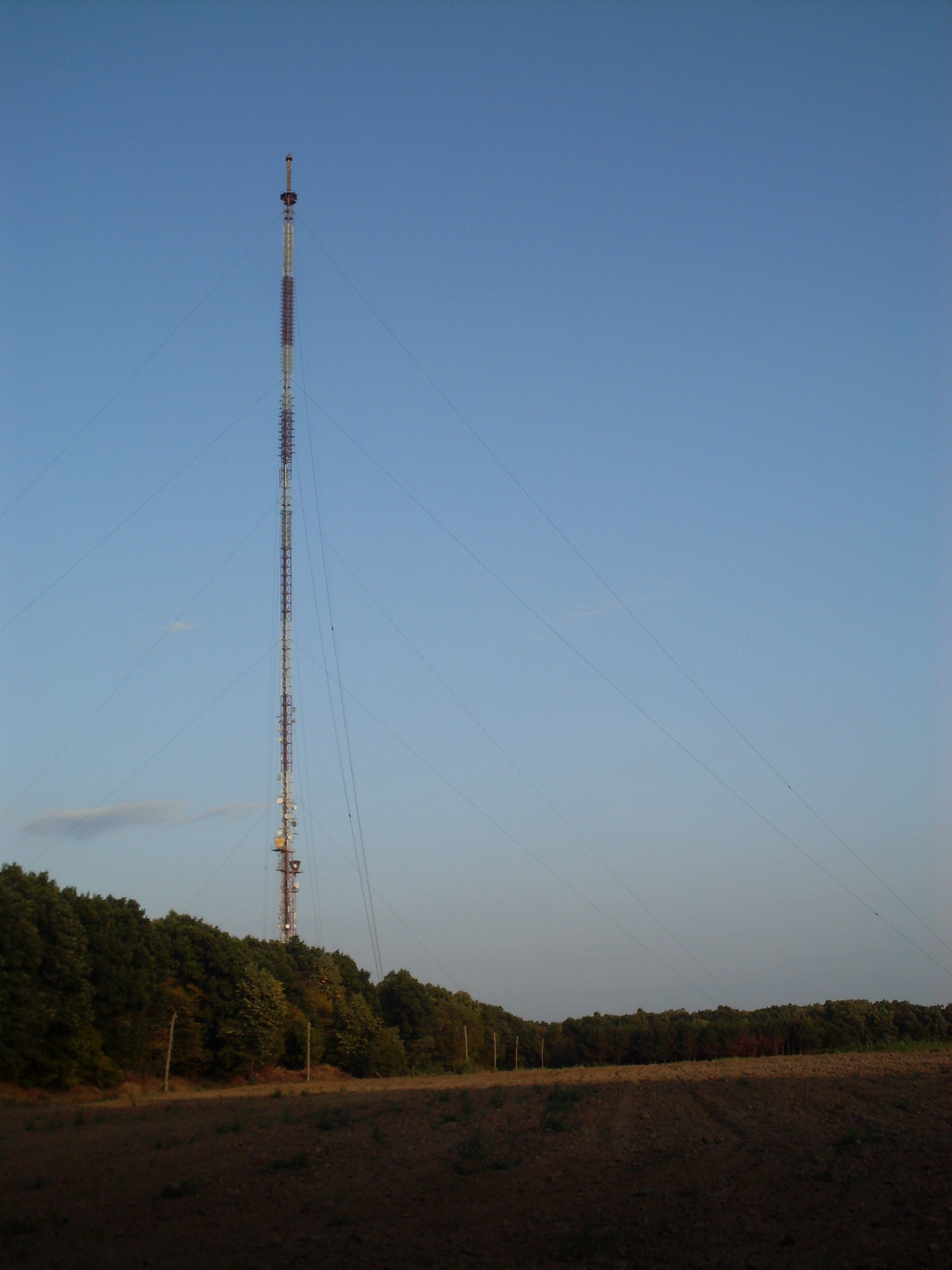
Strășeni TV mast

The main branches of the economy are agriculture and manufacturing. Soil and climatic conditions favor the growth of cereals, sunflower, grapes, and other crops. The mineral resources in the district are stone, gravel, pebbles and sand for building in Micăuți. Communication services are provided by Moldtelecom and the Post of Moldova. There are 15 factories operating in the territory, including for processing grapes and a poultry factory in Bucovăț. The district is home to 17 companies. The largest factory: SA "Marsrut", JSC "Caan" experimental-mechanical plant was included in the national privatization program.

Arable land occupies 18,903 ha (25.9%) of the total land, vineyards occupy 8,292 ha (11.3%), plantations of orchards 3,386 ha (4.6%), 3,244 ha of grassland (4.4%), 242 ha of fruit trees (0.3%), some 451 ha (0.6%).

== Education ==
In district there are 42 educational institutions, with a total of 10,721 students. Currently, there are 1,040 teachers.

== Politics ==
In Strășeni district, support for right-wing politics was represented by the Alliance for European Integration (AEI). The Moldovan Communist Party (PCRM) had a continuous fall in the three elections from 2009 to 2010. During the elections AEI had an increase of 73.0%.

Parliament election results
Year	AEI	PCRM
2010	67.00% 28,858	26.44% 11,389
July 2009	62.22% 25,589	32.86% 13,513
April 2009	42.04% 16,680	44.06% 17,479

=== Elections ===
28 November 2010 election results in Strășeni District
Parties and coalitions	Votes	%	+/−
Liberal Democratic Party of Moldova	17,719	41.13	+23.06
Party of Communists of the Republic of Moldova	11,389	26.44	−6.42
Liberal Party	5,403	12.54	−8.63
Democratic Party of Moldova	4,862	11.29	-0.73
Party Alliance Our Moldova	874	2.03	−8.93
European Action Movement	865	2.01	+2.01
Other Party	2,412	5.56	+0.64
Total (turnout 58.17%)	43,396	100.00	

== Culture ==
Strășeni has 72 cultural institutions, including a culture house, 32 community centers, clubs, 35 libraries, two art schools, three museums and a monastic complex. The Ralli family mansion, where Alexander Pushkin lived in the summer of 1821 is located in Dolna village.

== Health ==
There is a hospital with general fund of 192 beds, a center of family physicians which includes 15 offices of family doctors, 13 health centers, 9 health offices, the health district population. The district operates 134 doctors, 297 personal care environment, and 306 medical and auxiliary personnel.

== Transportation ==
The district is crossed by railways, means of communication used extensively to transport goods by business district, and especially Strășeni. The district is crossed by the M1 highway (Chișinău–Ungheni).
