= Plaiul Fagului =

Scientific reserve in Moldova

Coordinates: 47°17′28″N 28°03′16″E

- Rezervația științifică Plaiul Fagului
- IUCN category Ia (strict nature reserve)
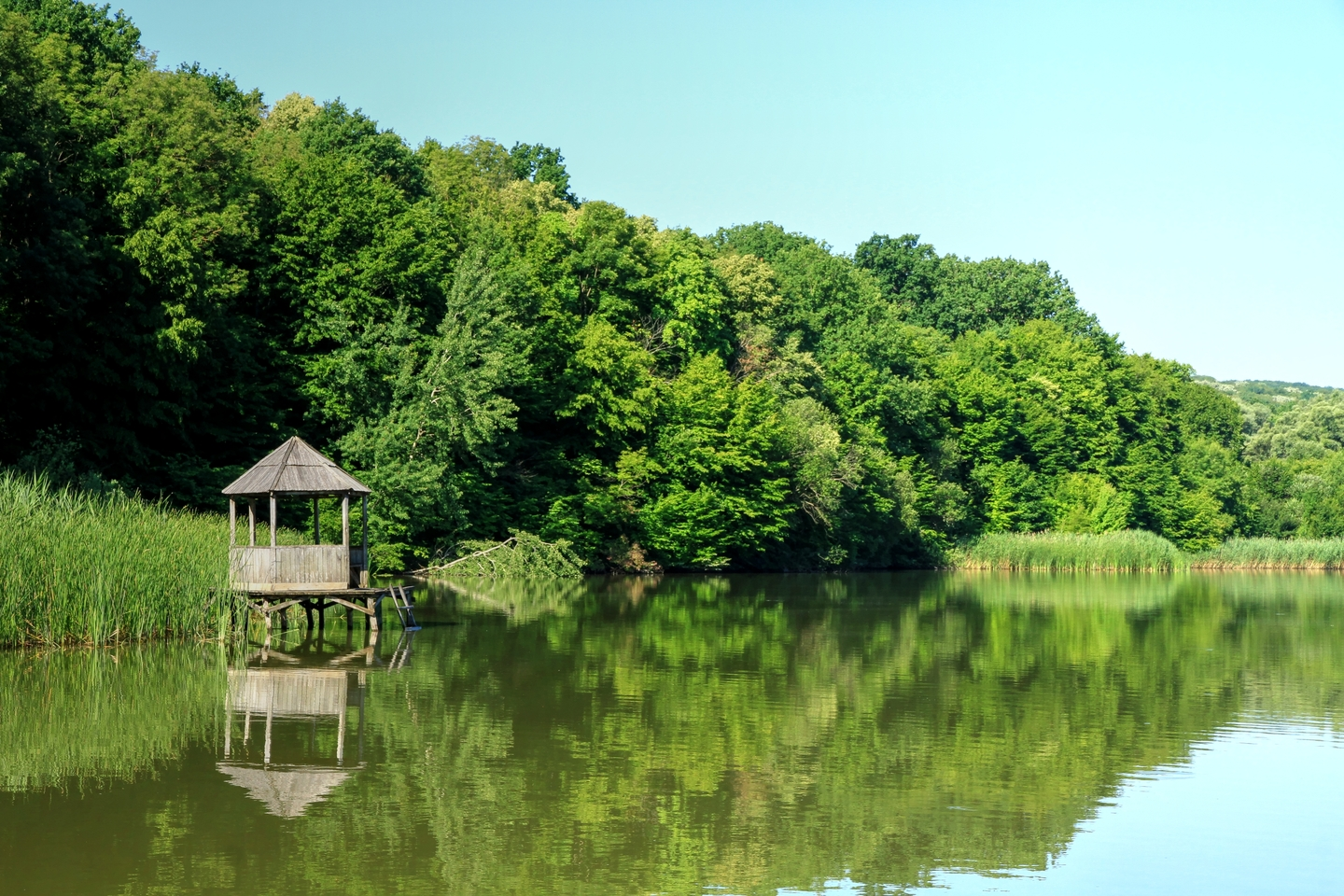

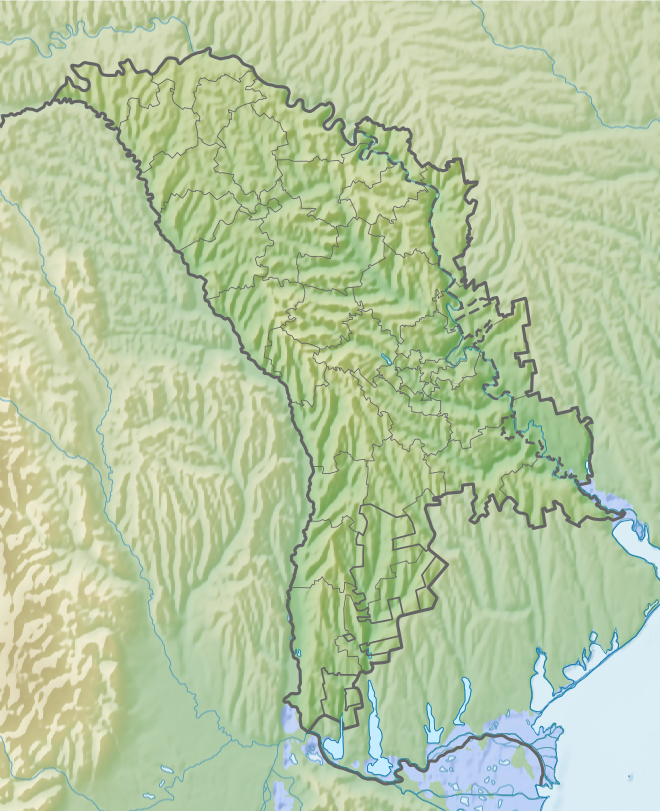
- Location within Moldova
- Location: Ungheni District, Moldova
- Area: 5,642 hectares (56.42 km^{2})
- Established: 1992

Plaiul Fagului (Romanian: Rezervația științifică Plaiul Fagului) is a scientific reserve located in the Ungheni District of Moldova. It was founded on 12 March 1992 with the aim of protecting, studying and restoring natural ecosystems, flora and fauna of the forest region of Codru.

== Description ==
The reserve was established in 1992 on the basis of the Reden Forest (Romanian: Pădurea Redeniului, Russian: Реденский лес, romanized: Redensky les) hunting ground, which had existed here since 1976, in the northwestern part of the Codru Upland. The landscape of the reserve is a rugged hilly area covered with dense forest (called codru in Romanian). The total area of the reserve is 5,642 hectares, of which forests occupy 4,639 hectares. Natural landscapes are represented on 5,387 hectares, other territories - 183 hectares, including arable land (7 hectares), orchards (8 hectares), perennial plantings (13 hectares), pastures (21 hectares), swamps (7 hectares), ponds (24 hectares), capital construction projects (15 hectares), non-production lands (35 hectares). The zone with an absolutely protected regime, in which any human activity is prohibited, occupies 800 hectares, around the reserve a 1.5 km wide security zone has been established, where economic activity is limited.

Approximately in the middle of the territory flows a small river Telița (a tributary of the river Bîc), on which a cascade of ponds is built. Scientific research support for the reserve is provided by the Academy of Sciences of Moldova.

== Flora ==
The flora of the reserve is typical of the broad-leaved forests of Central Europe. Six forest types have been identified and described, formed by the following predominant species: European beech (272 ha), ash (1163 ha), hornbeam, sessile oak and common oak (1039 ha), linden (169 ha), forests with other species (maple, poplar, willow).

The European beech in the reserve reaches an age of 150 years, a height of up to 40 m, with a trunk diameter of over 100 cm. Beech forests are located at altitudes of over 200 m above sea level, on the steepest slopes.

On the slopes of hills and valleys, individual areas of steppe and meadow vegetation have been preserved here and there. The flora of the reserve includes 909 species, including 645 species of vascular plants, 151 species of fungi, 48 species of lichens, 65 species of mosses. 270 species of plants are considered rare for the flora of Moldova, 82 are specially protected, of which the fern Dryopteris austriaca, Lunaria spp., Orthilia secunda, Pyrola rotundifolia, Padus avium and Telekia speciosa are known in Moldova only within the reserve.

== Fauna ==
The fauna of the reserve, as well as of the whole of Moldova, due to the long-standing development of the territory, is quite poor in large species of wild animals and birds. The bison, brown bear, lynx, and black grouse that used to live here disappeared from the fauna of Moldova more than 100 years ago.

Currently, 49 species of mammals, about 142 species of birds, 8 species of reptiles, 12 species of amphibians and 65 species of invertebrates of the soil fauna are registered in the fauna of the reserve. Large ungulates are represented by the following species: wild boar, European roe deer, and the reintroduced European red deer. These ungulates are quite common in the forests of the reserve. Recently, the fauna has been replenished with fallow deer and Far Eastern sika deer.

Of the mammals found here, rodents are the most common, with 18 species recorded, while predators are less numerous (8 species), and insectivores (6 species) and 4 species of bats are at the bottom of the list. Among the predators are the European wildcat listed in the Red Book of Moldova, the forest and stone marten, the badger, the common fox, the polecat, and the weasel. There are 3 subspecies of squirrels.

Of the 8 species of reptiles in the reserve, 4 are listed in the Red Book of Moldova, including: the European pond turtle, the common viper, the common smooth snake, and the Aesculapian snake. The protected forests and water bodies of the reserve are important for migratory birds to stop and rest - herons, ducks, swans, and waders. 7 species of woodpeckers have been recorded. Birds of prey nest here such as booted eagle, lesser spotted eagle, hawks (goshawk and sparrowhawk), black kite, buzzard.
