= Ralli family mansion =

- Conacul lui Zamfirache Ralli
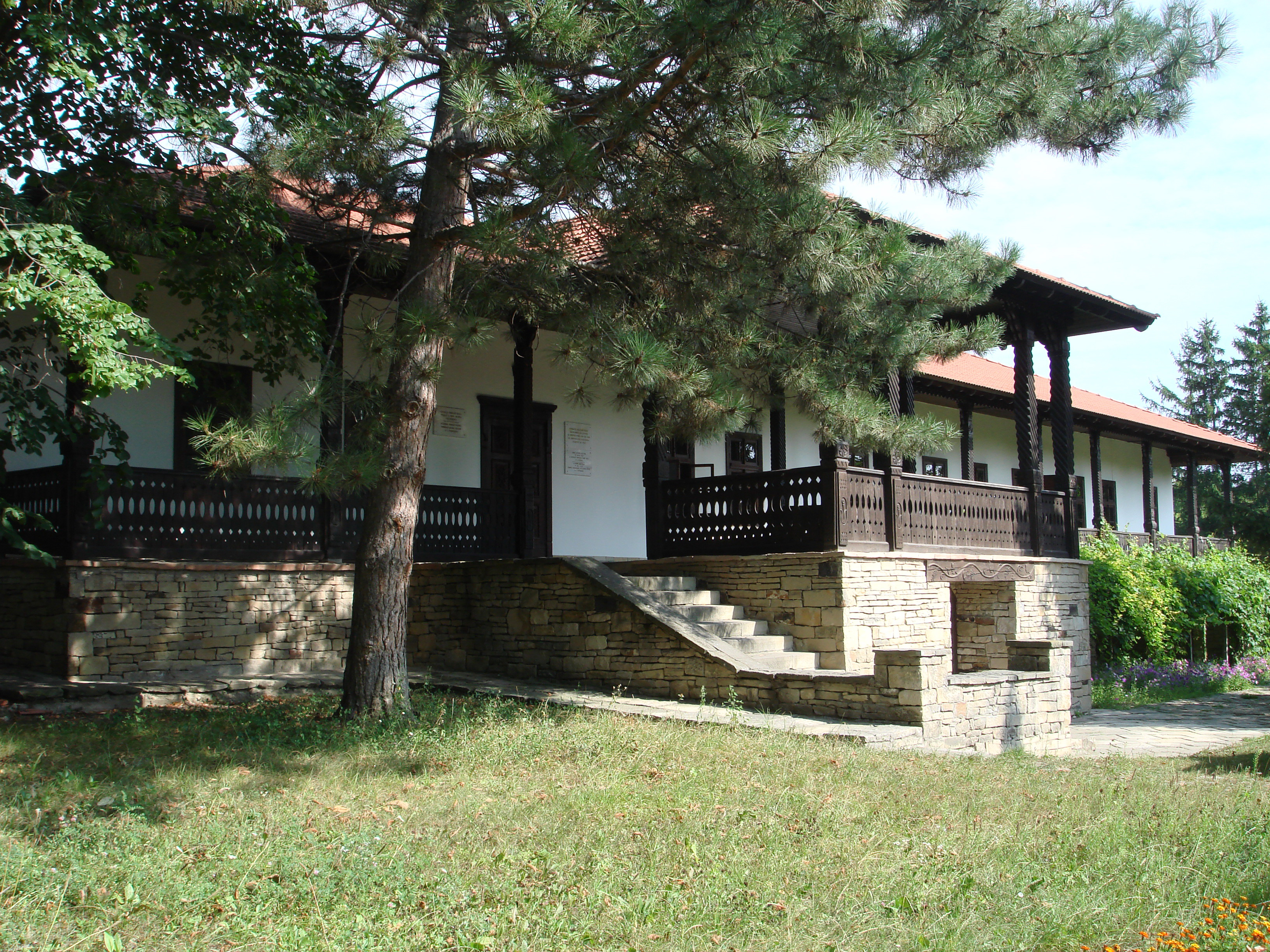
- The Ralli manor and present-day museum in Dolna, Moldova

- Location within Moldova

General information
- Type: Mansion
- Location: Dolna, Strășeni, Moldova
- Coordinates: 47.125330°N 28.271885°E
- Renovated: 2002

The Mansion of Ralli family is a former boyar residence from the early 19th century, built by the wealthy Greek nobleman Zamfirache Ralli in the village of Dolna, in the Bessarabia region (nowadays located in the Strășeni district of the Republic of Moldova). This place is particularly renowned for being frequently visited by the famous Russian poet Alexander Pushkin during his exile in Chișinău from 1821 to 1823.

== History ==
Greek merchant Zamfirache Ralli (b. 1769 – d. 1831) at the end of the 18th century, settled in Moldova and attained nobility through his marriage to a descendant of the local nobility from the ancient Arbore family. At the beginning of 19th century, he owned 6 villages. Zamfirache Ralli had a large family, consisting of five boys and three girls, who resided in Chișinău and would spend their holidays at this mansion in Dolna.

== Pushkin in exile ==
The Ralli Mansion is known for being the place where the Russian poet Alexander Pushkin lived for a few weeks in 1821 during his exile in Bessarabia (1820-1823). He was deported due to his poetry that advocated for freedom. During his time in Bessarabia, Pushkin became acquainted with the local landowner Zamfirache Ralli, who invited him to his estate in the village of Dolna. It is said that it was here that Pushkin met Zemfira, the baron's daughter, whose beauty overwhelmed and inspired him to write his famous poem "The Gypsies" in 1824.

Ion Ralli, who was the son of Zamfirache, was a good friend of Pushkin, and they were about the same age. When Pushkin died away in 1847, Ion Ralli undertook the construction of a church just 15 minutes away from his mansion. This church was finished in 1849 and continues to be in active use today.

== Museum ==
In 1946, the mansion was transformed into a house-museum with a permanent exhibition dedicated to Alexander Pushkin, preserving the atmosphere of the mansion during the period when the poet stayed there. It was opened to the public on Pushkin's birthday, June 6, 1949.

In 1964, the house becomes a subsidiary of the House-Museum of A.S. Pushkin in Chișinău.

After the dissolution of the Soviet Union, the estate was closed for reconstruction and was, in fact, abandoned. In 2002, thanks to the initiative of Vladimir Voronin, President of Moldova and with financial support from the Lukoil company, the mansion underwent repairs and restoration.

A park extends around the mansion. In 1972 a monument to Pushkin was made by the Russian sculptor Oleg Komov.

All the exhibits are authentic, dating back to the 18th and 19th centuries, with the majority of them being brought from Saint Petersburg and Chișinău. Since 1980, Pushkin's poetry has been celebrated in Dolna. An annual festival takes place here on the first Sunday of June, as Pushkin's birthday is on June 6, attracting admirers of the poet's work.

== Gallery ==
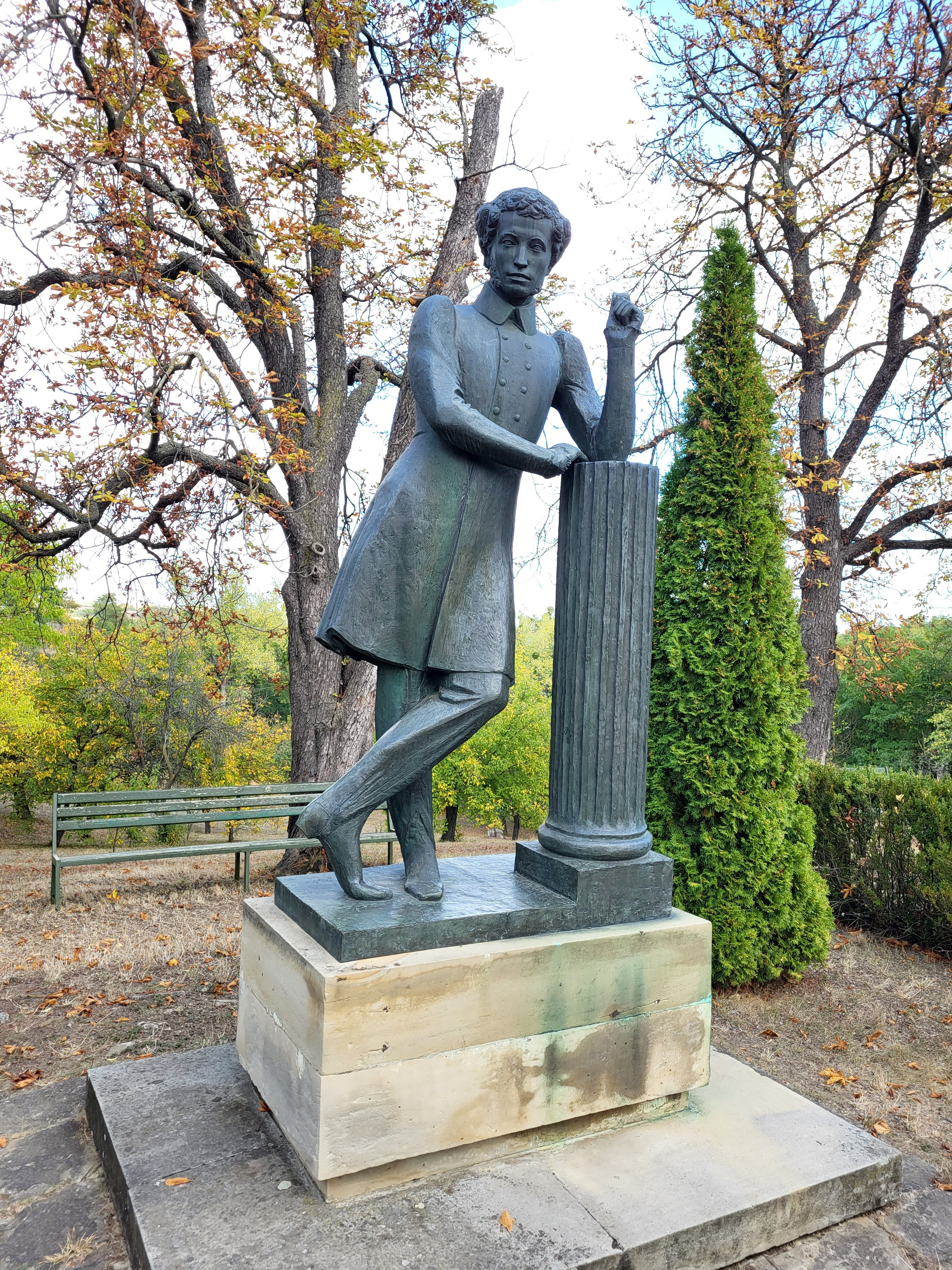
Alexandr Pushkin statue

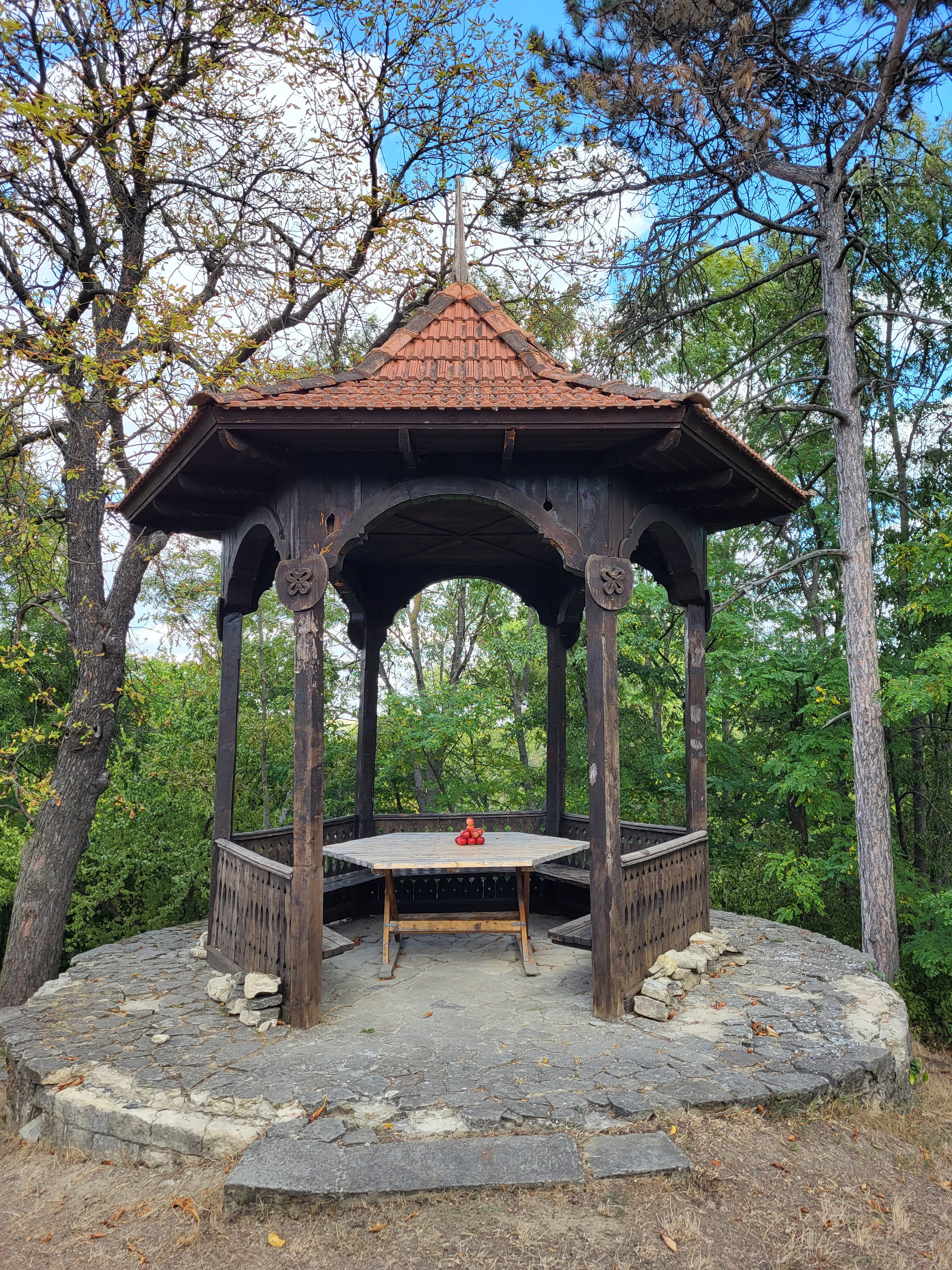
The Gazebo in the park

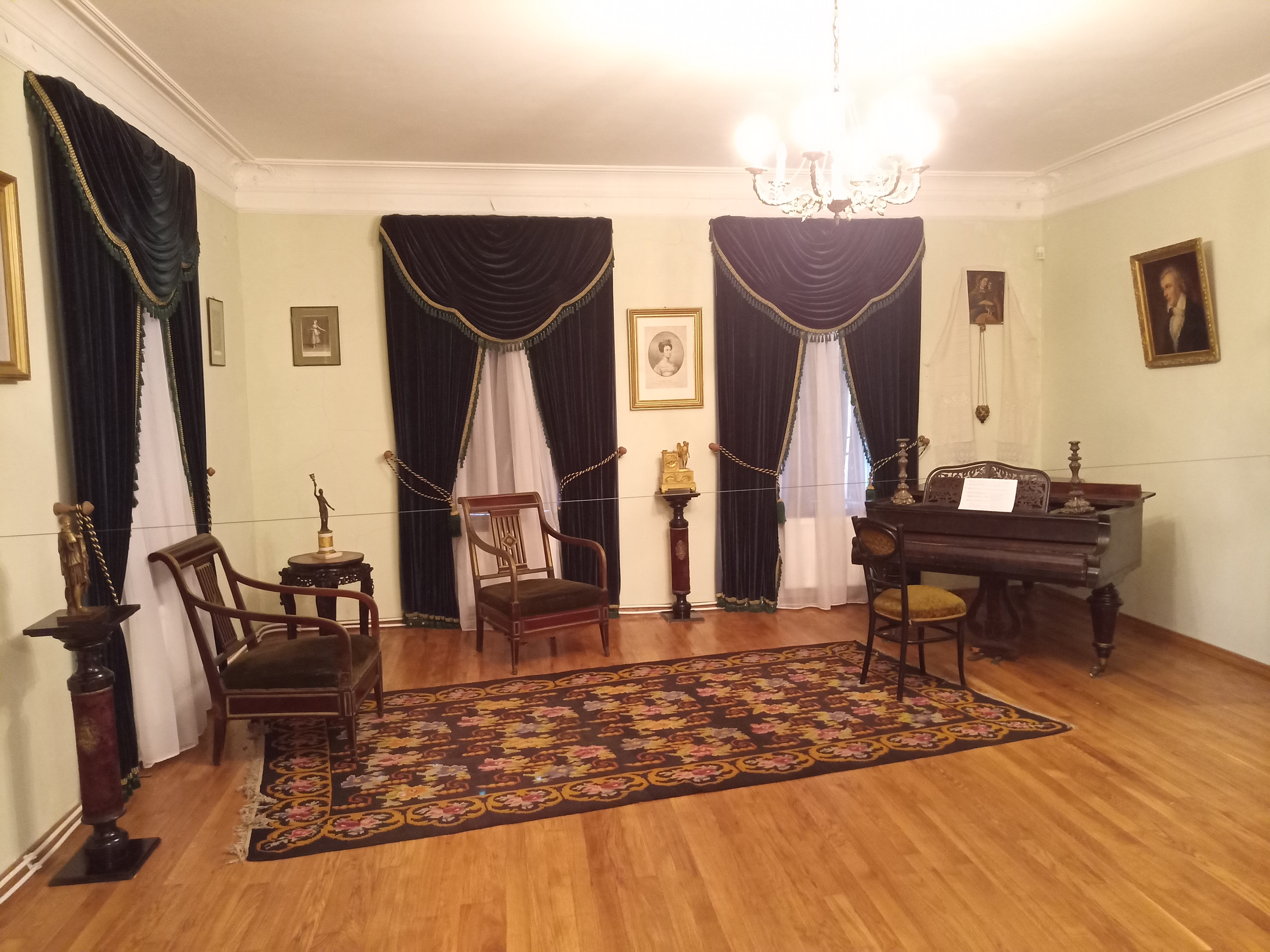
Inside the house

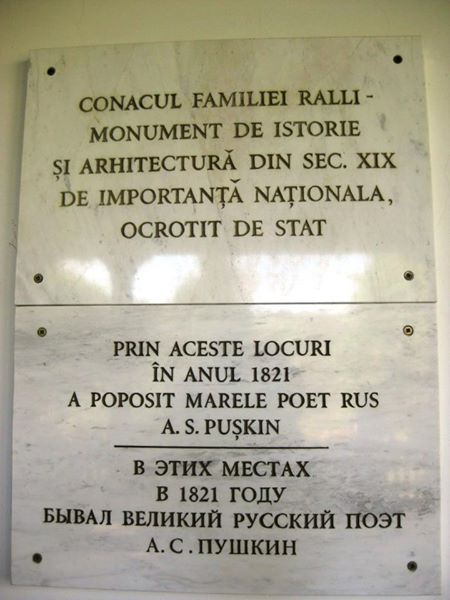
Historical plaque

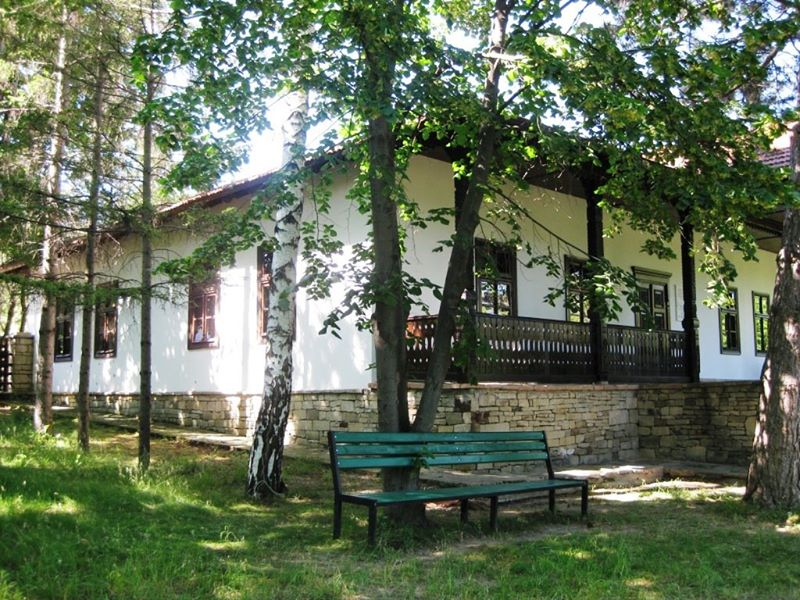
View of the house
