= Temeleuți =

Temeleuţi may refer to several places in Moldova:

- Temeleuţi, Călăraşi, a commune in Călăraşi district
- Temeleuţi, Floreşti, a commune in Floreşti district

== See also ==
- Temelia, a village in Gura Văii, Bacău Commune, Bacău County, Romania
