= Bucovăț =

- Town
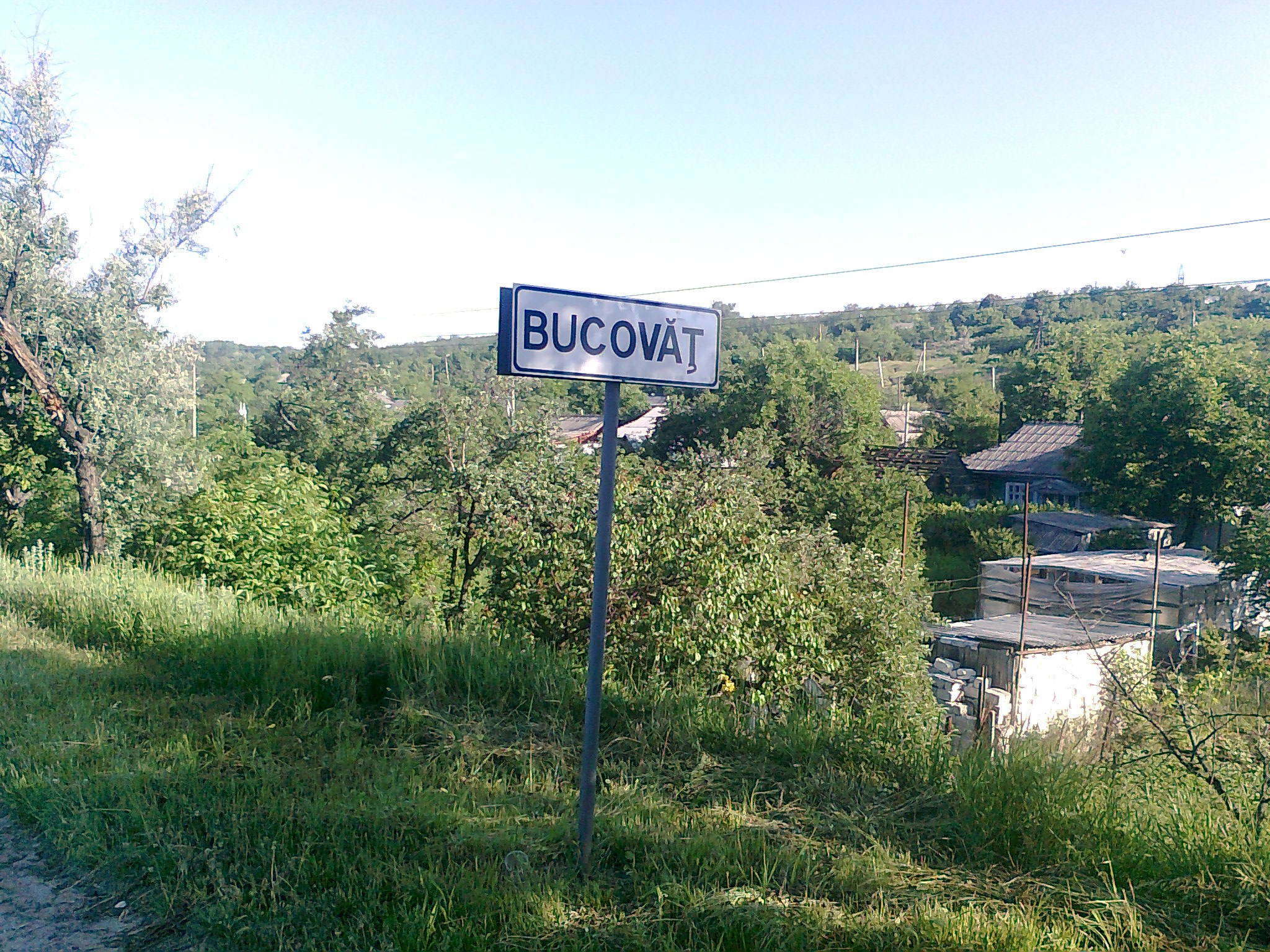

- Location within Moldova
- Coordinates: 47°11′19″N 28°37′25″E
- Country: Moldova
- District: Strășeni district

Government
  - Mayor: Alexandru Pascaru (Independent)

Population (2014)
  - Total: 1,601
- Time zone: UTC+2 (EET)
  - Summer (DST): UTC+3 (EEST)
- Climate: Dfb

Bucovăț (Romanian pronunciation: [bukoˈvət͡s]) is a town in Strășeni district, Moldova. One village is administered by the town, Rassvet.
