= Gavril Bănulescu-Bodoni =

Romanian clergyman

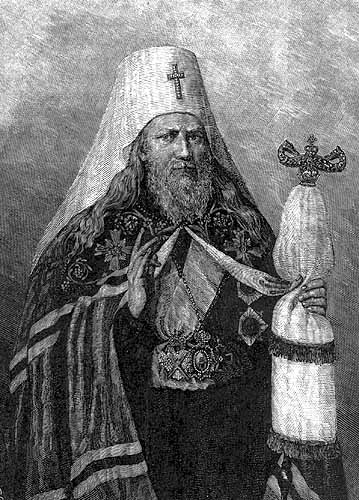
- Born: 1746; Bistrița, Transylvania
- Died: 30 April 1821
- Resting place: Căpriana Monastery
- Education: NaUKMA

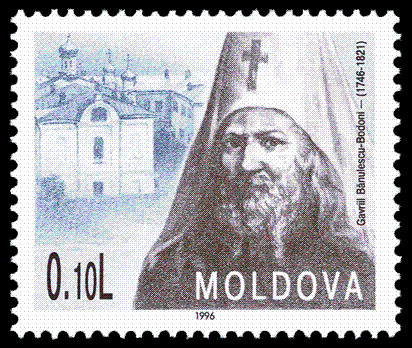
Gavril Bănulescu-Bodoni

Gavril Bănulescu-Bodoni (Romanian pronunciation: [ɡaˈvril bənuˈlesku boˈdoni]; 1746 – 30 March 1821) was a Romanian clergyman who served as Metropolitan of Moldavia (1792), Metropolitan of Kherson and Crimea (1793–1799), Metropolitan of Kiev and Halych (1799–1803), Exarch of Moldo-Wallachia (1806–1812), and Archbishop of Chișinău (1812–1821), being the first head of the church in Bessarabia after the Russian annexation.

== Biography ==
=== Early life ===
Born in Bistrița, Transylvania to a family originating from Câmpulung, Moldavia, Bănulescu studied at the Kiev Theological Academy (1771–1773), then at the Greek-language academy in the Island of Patmos, Smyrna and the Athonite Academy in Vatopedi (1773–1786). At Patmos, he befriended Nikephoros Theotokis, a Greek cleric and enlightenment figure, with whom he taught at the Princely Academy of Iași in 1776.

In 1779 he became a monk in Constantinople, then continued his studies in Patmos, returning to Moldavia in 1781 to be a preacher at the Metropolitan cathedral. Then, between 1782–1784, he taught philosophy and Greek language in Poltava at the Slavic Seminary, then in the Russian Empire.

=== Clergyman in Moldavia ===
In 1784, Bănulescu-Bodoni returned to Iași to serve under Metropolitan Gavriil Callimachi, then moved to the diocese of Huși. In 1784 he was nominated to become a bishop of Roman, but the phanariote ruler declined his nomination. After the second Russo-Turkish War began, he fled to Ukraine, together with the phanariot ruler of Moldavia, Alexander Mavrocordatos Firaris. In Imperial Russia, he became the rector of the Poltava Seminary.

In 1789, as Russians occupied the Danubian Principalities, Catherine II of Russia and the Holy Synod appointed Archbishop Amvrosii Serebrennikov of Ekaterinoslav to be the locum tenens Exarch of Moldo-Wallachia, naming in 1791 Bănulescu-Bodoni bishop of Cetatea Albă. The Treaty of Iași ended the military occupation of Wallachia and Moldavia, but prior to the Russian retreat, in February 1792, Amvrosii appointed Bănulescu-Bodoni the Metropolitan of Moldavia.

Patriarch Neophytus VII saw the appointment a challenge to the authority of the Patriarchate of Constantinople and requested the new Phanariot hospodar, Alexander Mourousis to demand Bănulescu-Bodoni's departure. Bănulescu-Bodoni refused to leave without a Russian imperial decree. The patriarch convened with local bishops to declare his seat vacant and to select a new Metropolitan.

Neophytus VII also obtained an order from the Sultan to arrest Bănulescu-Bodoni, who was taken to Constantinople in June 1792. The Patriarch tried to give him a bishop's seat in Greece, but Bănulescu-Bodoni refused to give up his Russian citizenship. He was freed after the intervention of Prince Viktor Pavlovich Kochubey, the Russian ambassador to the Ottoman Empire.

=== Clergyman in Imperial Russia ===
Bănulescu-Bodoni returned to Russia to become Metropolitan of Kherson and Crimea (1793–1799), then Metropolitan of Kiev and Halich (1799–1803) and in 1801, a member of the Holy Synod of Petrograd.

When Catherine the Great was on her deathbed, he gave her the anointing of the sick.

Falling ill, Bănulescu settled in Odessa and Dubăsari, where he stayed until 1806, when following the Russo-Turk War, the Russian Army occupied again the Principalities and he was once again named Exarch of Moldo-Wallachia. The Russian annexation of Bessarabia was acknowledged by the Ottoman Empire in the Treaty of Bucharest and Bănulescu was named in charge with organizing the archdiocese of Bessarabia.

His proposal of the creation of a new eparchy was approved by Tsar Alexander I of Russia, whose ukaz of 21 August 1813 created a new "Archbishopry of Chișinău and Hotin", which included Bessarabia and the Kherson gubernya, including the cities of Odessa, Tiraspol, Ananiv and Elisabetgrad. The tsar allowed the eparchy to organize itself according to "local customs".

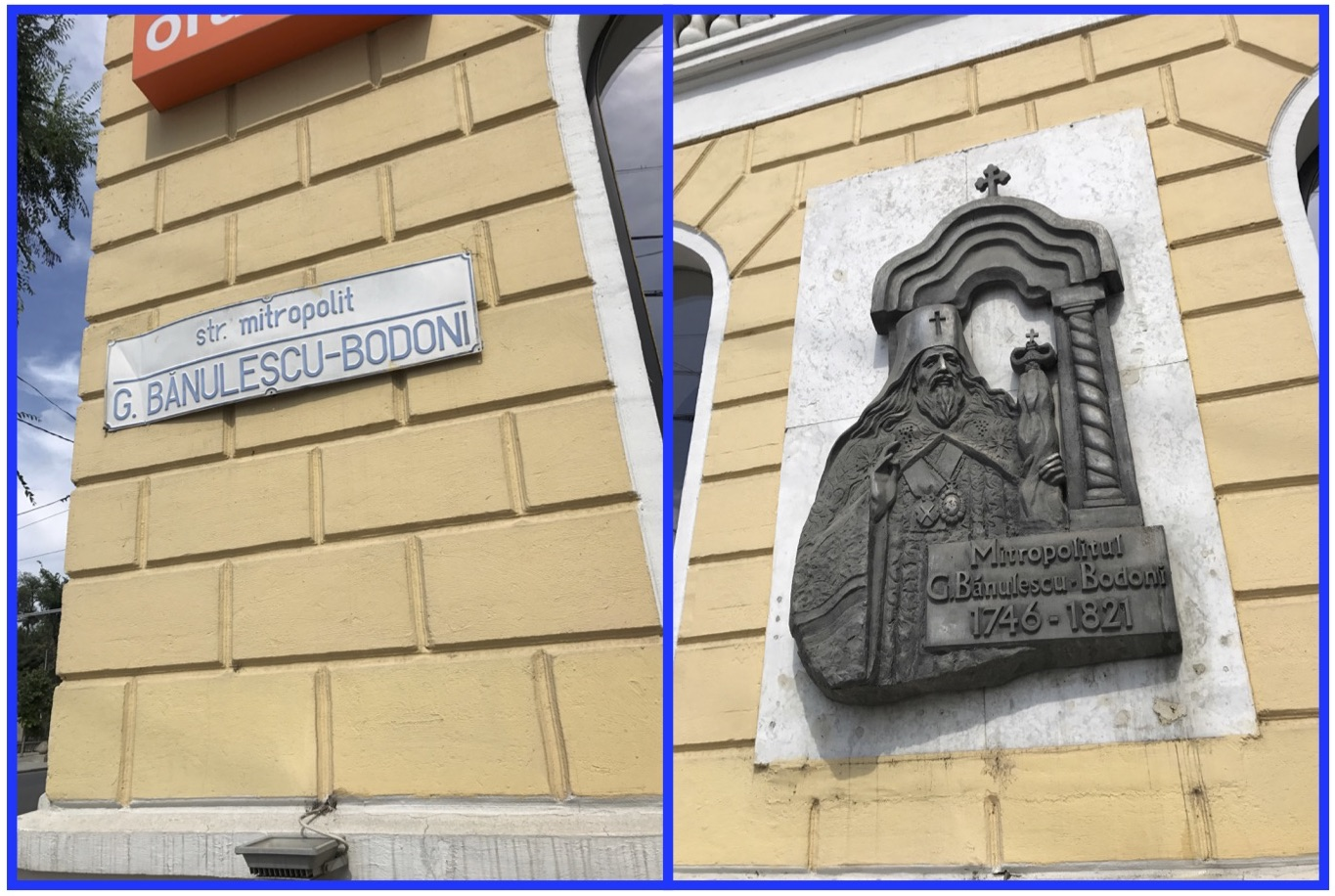
Road name and commemorative plaque in Chisinau, Moldova, commemorating Archbishop Gavril Bănulescu-Bodoni.

The local boyars, led by Bănulescu-Bodoni, petitioned for self-rule and the establishment of a civil government based on the Moldavian traditional laws. In 1818, a special autonomous region was created, which had both Moldavian (Romanian) and Russian as languages used in the local administration.

In 1813, Bănulescu-Bodoni founded a Romanian-language seminary and in 1814, a printing press. He also oversaw the building of the Chișinău Metropolitan Church (1817) and of the Soborul Cathedral. A Romanian translation of the New Testament was published in 1817 and the whole Bible in 1819 in Petrograd.

Bănulescu died in 1821, and was buried at the Căpriana Monastery. He was canonized by the Moldovan Orthodox Church in 2016.

He is commemorated in Chișinău, where a street is named after him near the Nativity Cathedral.

== Canonization ==
Gavriil Bănulescu-Bodoni was canonized by the Metropolis of Chișinău and All Moldova on 3 September, 2016, as Saint Hierarch Gabriel (in Romanian: Sfântul Ierarh Gavriil).

== Sources ==
- Ion Nistor, Istoria Basarabiei, Humanitas, 1991. ISBN 973-28-0283-9
- Charles King, The Moldovans: Romania, Russia, and the Politics of Culture, 2000, Hoover Institution Press. ISBN 0-8179-9791-1
- Stephen K. Batalden, "Metropolitan Gavriil (Banulesko-Bodoni) and Greek-Russian Conflict over Dedicated Monastic Estates, 1787-1812", Church History, Vol. 52, No. 4. (Dec., 1983), pp. 468–478.
- Mircea Păcurariu, "Gavriil Bănulescu ", entry in Dicţionarul Teologilor Români, Editura Univers Enciclopedic, Bucharest, 1996 ISBN 973-97391-4-8
