= Micăuți =

- Commune
- Location within Moldova
- Coordinates: 47.1722222222°N 28.7488888889°E
- Country: Moldova
- District: Strășeni District

Population (2014)
  - Total: 2,857
- Time zone: UTC+2 (EET)
  - Summer (DST): UTC+3 (EEST)

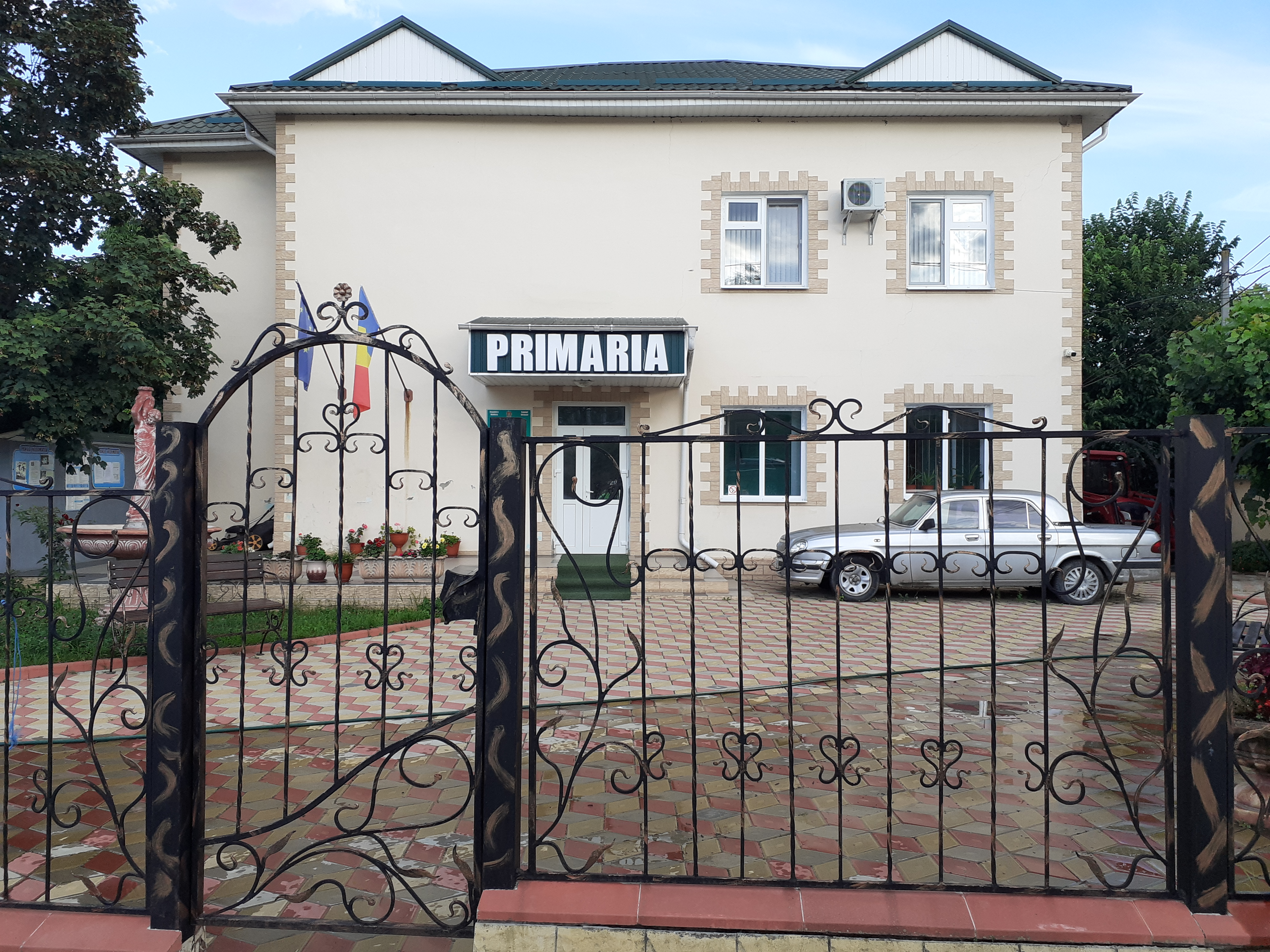
Micăuți commune town hall

Micăuți is a commune in Strășeni District, Moldova. It is composed of two villages, Gornoe and Micăuți.
