= Căpriana =

- Village
- Location within Moldova
- Coordinates: 47.1172222222°N 28.5041666667°E
- Country: Moldova
- District: Strășeni

Government
  - Mayor: Tudor Scutaru (PLDM)

Population (2014 census)
  - Total: 2,312
- Time zone: UTC+2 (EET)
  - Summer (DST): UTC+3 (EEST)

Căpriana is a village in Strășeni District, Moldova.

Căpriana monastery is a popular tourist destination, a wedding venue, and a religious centre.
