= Căpriana monastery =

Căpriana Monastery
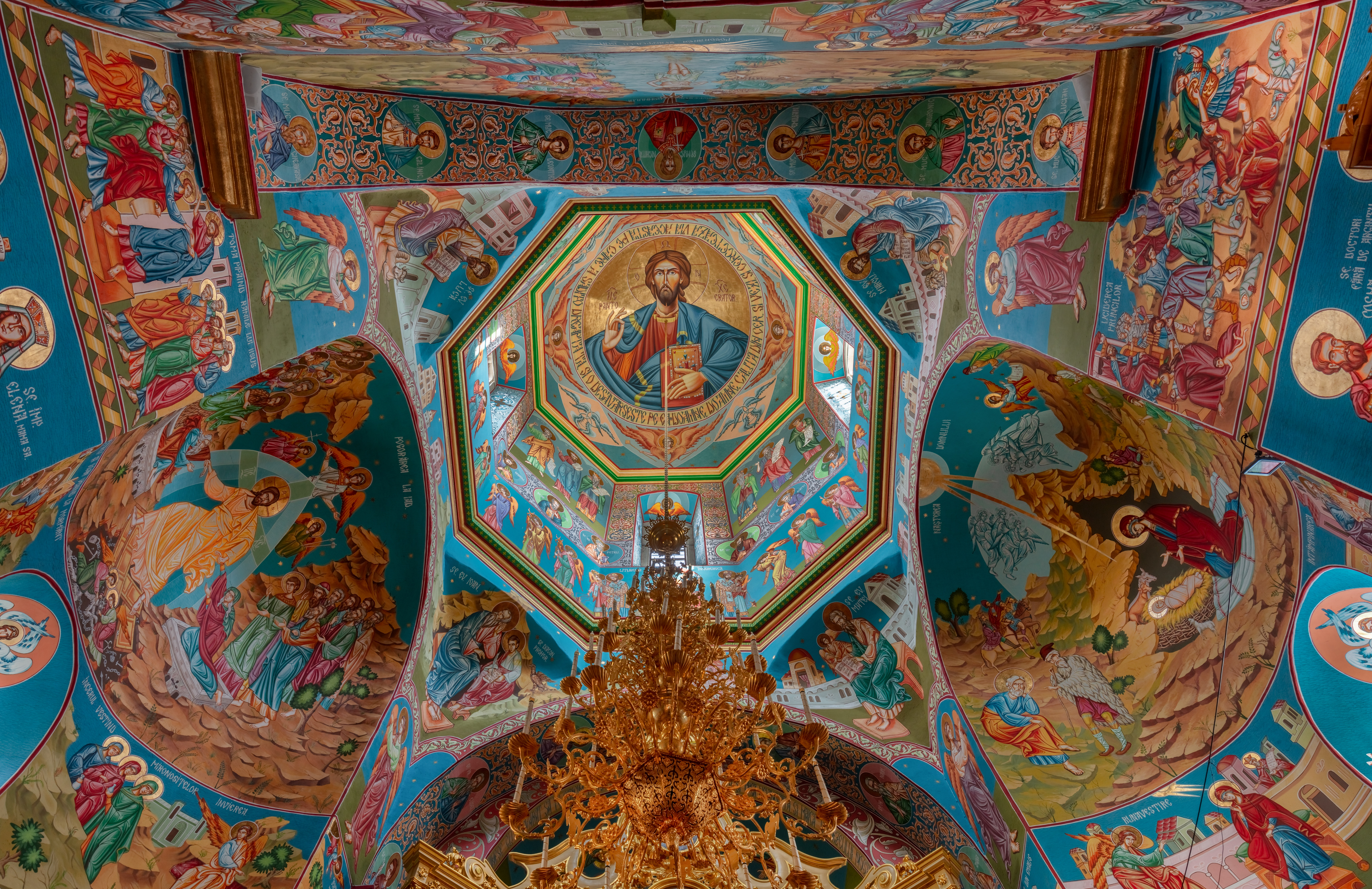
- An inside shot of the monastery
- Căpriana Monastery
- 47.116621°N 28.510637°E
- Location: Căpriana, Strășeni District
- Country: Moldova
- Denomination: Eastern Orthodoxy

History
- Status: Monastery
- Founded: 1429

Architecture
- Style: Moldavian

Specifications
- Materials: stone

The Căpriana Monastery (Romanian: Mănăstirea Căpriana) is one of the oldest monasteries of Moldova, located in Căpriana, 40 km (25 miles) north-west of Chișinău.

== Overview ==
Established in medieval Moldavia, Căpriana is situated in a picturesque forested area once called Codrii Lăpușnei.

The first significant reference dates from a document issued in 1429 that gave Căpriana the status of royal monastery on behalf of Alexander the Good. In this deed the holy abode was referred to as "mănăstirea de la Vâșnovăț unde este egumen Chiprian" (the monastery of Vâșnovăț where the hegumen is Chiprian) and was given in the possession of Alexander's wife - princess Marena.

After a period of decay, the monastery was rebuilt at the behest of Petru Rareș, from 1542 to 1545.

== Churches ==
There are three churches on the monastery site. The Church of the Dormition (a stone summer church) is the oldest extant church in Moldova. The winter church of St George is a twentieth-century building. The nineteenth century church is dedicated to St Nicholas. The Church of the Dormition contains the tomb of Metropolitan Gavril Bănulescu-Bodoni.

== Gallery ==
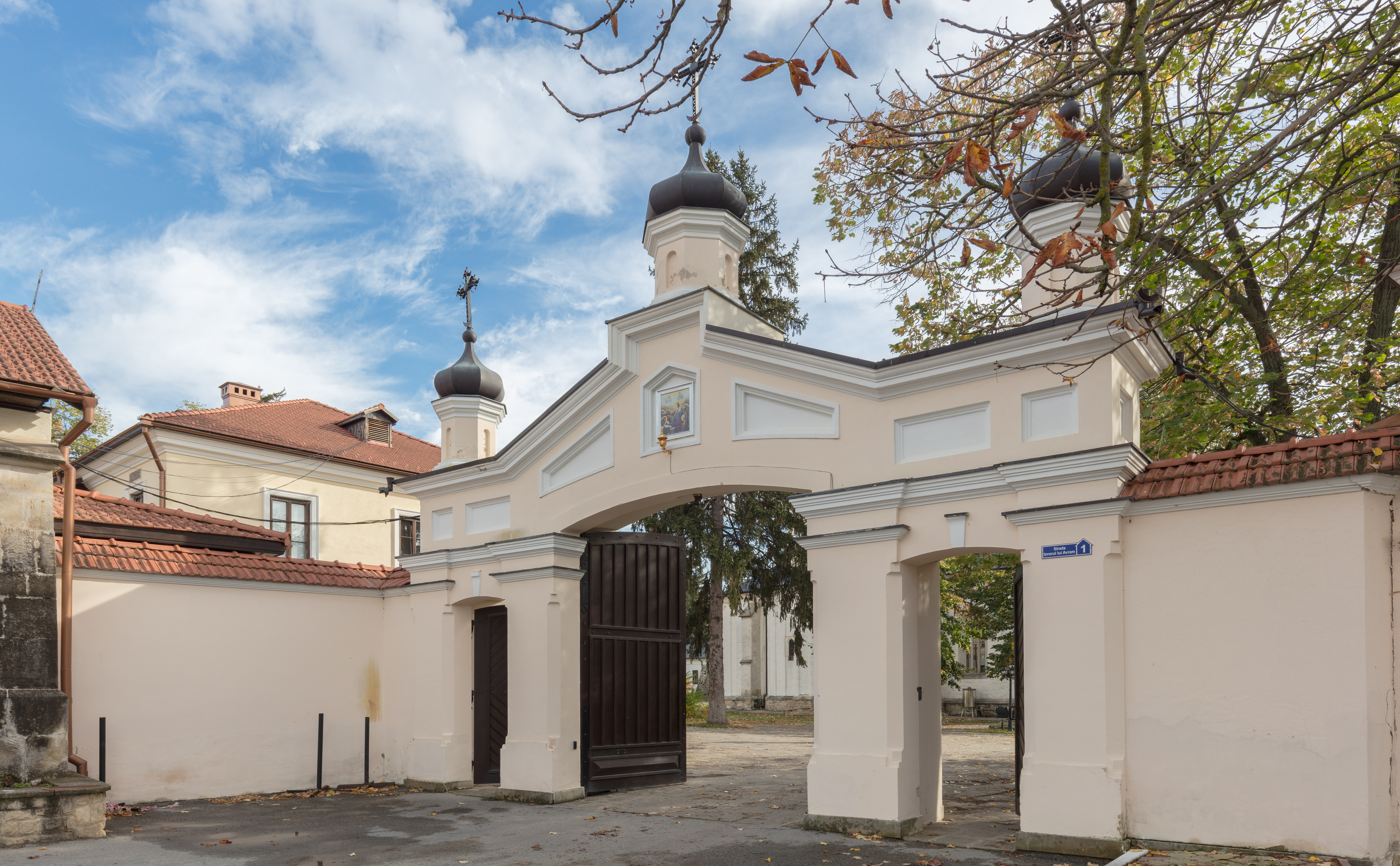
Entrance

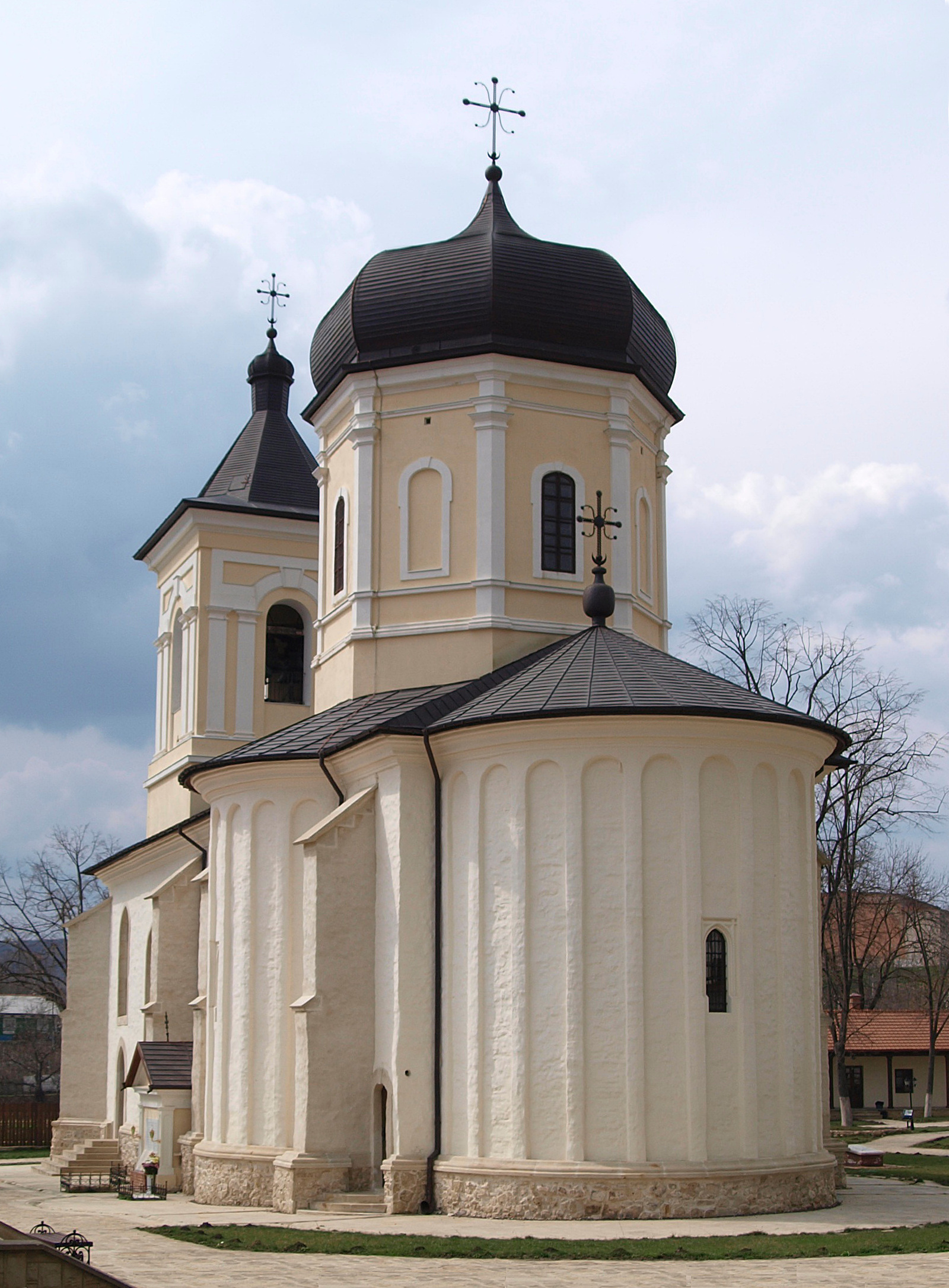
The stone church (1491–1496), built in Moldavian style by Moldavian Prince Stephen the Great

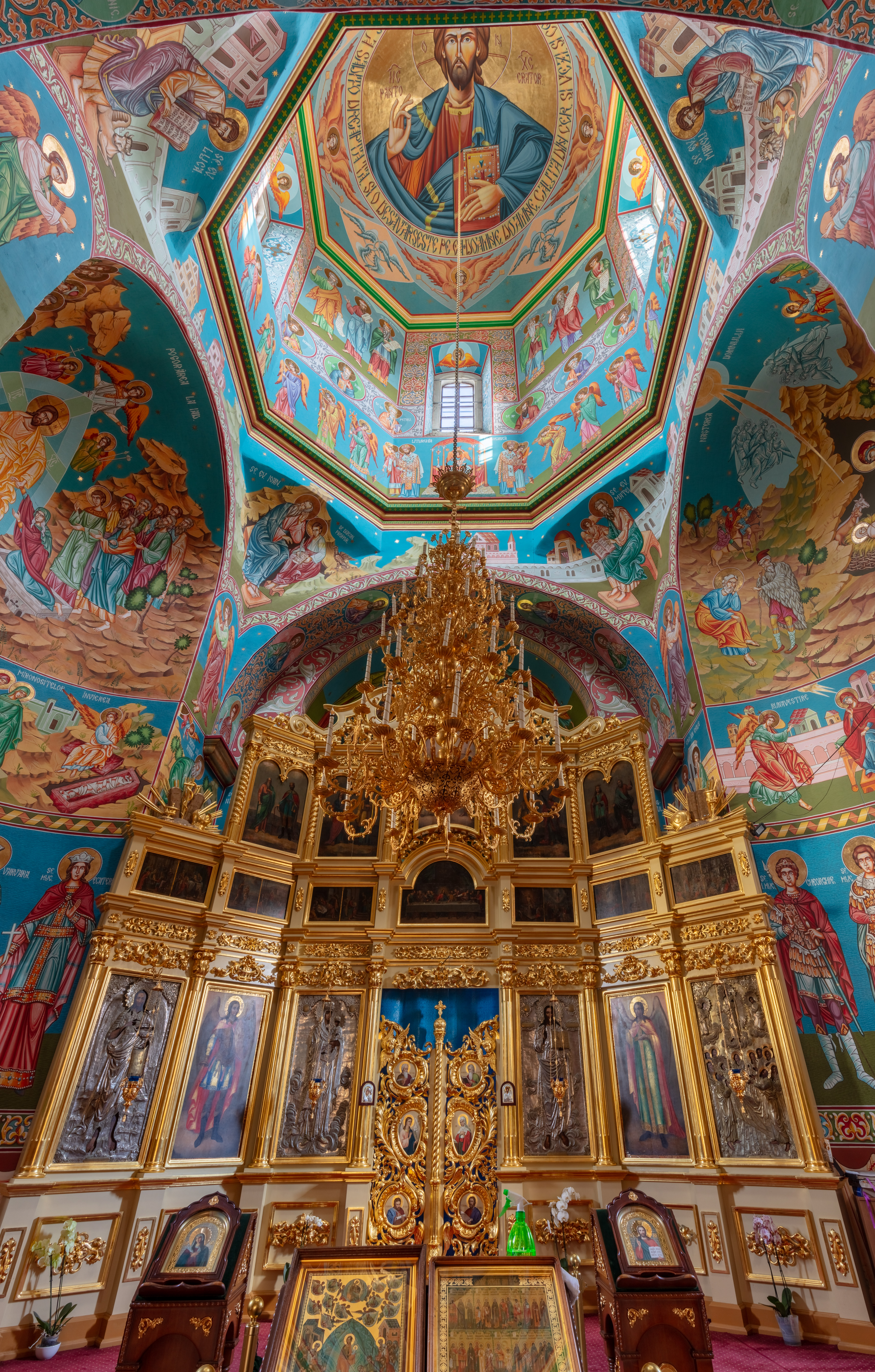
Inside the monastery

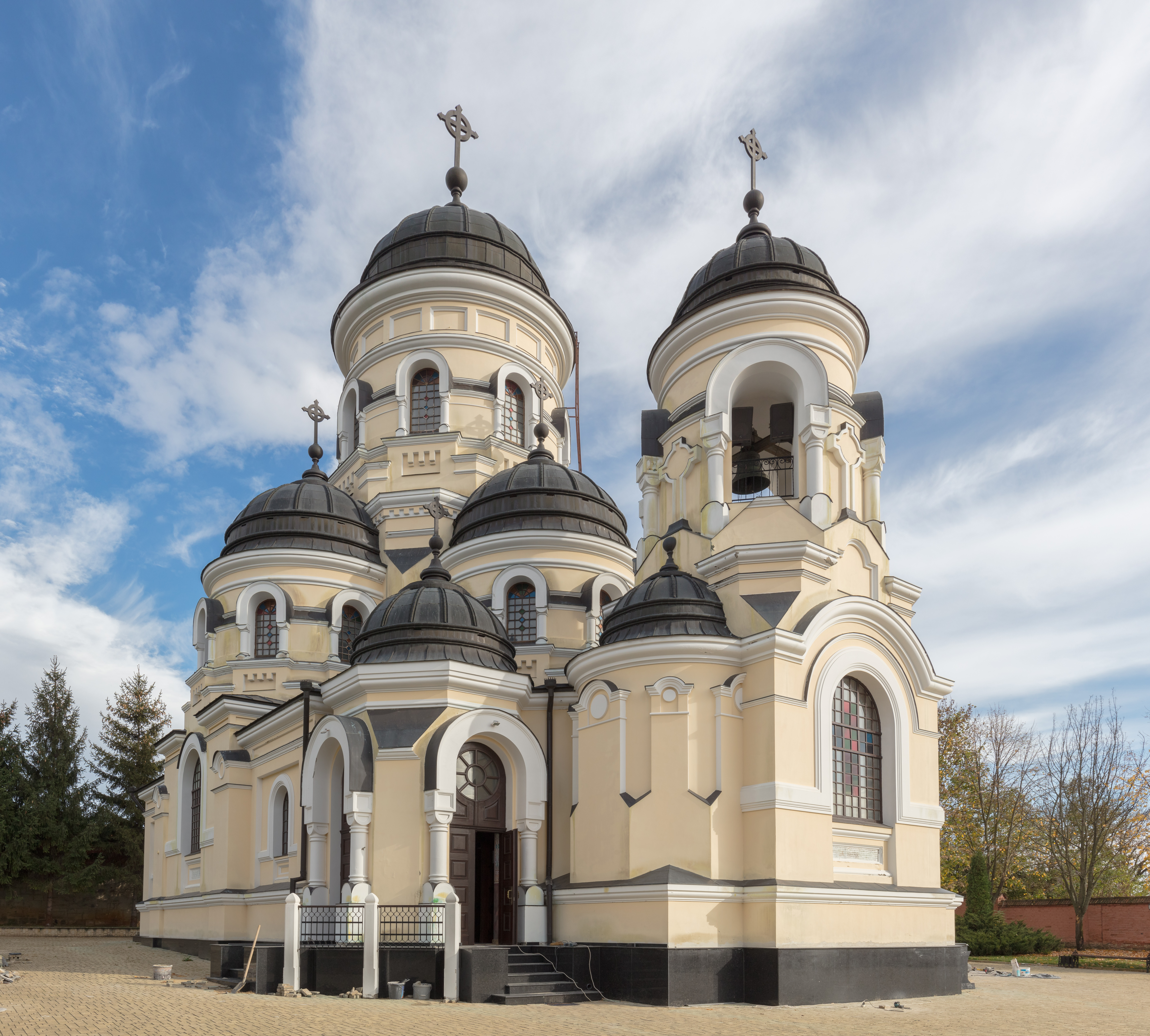
The "winter church" was raised in 1903, in a different architectural style (Neo-Byzantine style) during the Bessarabia Governorate

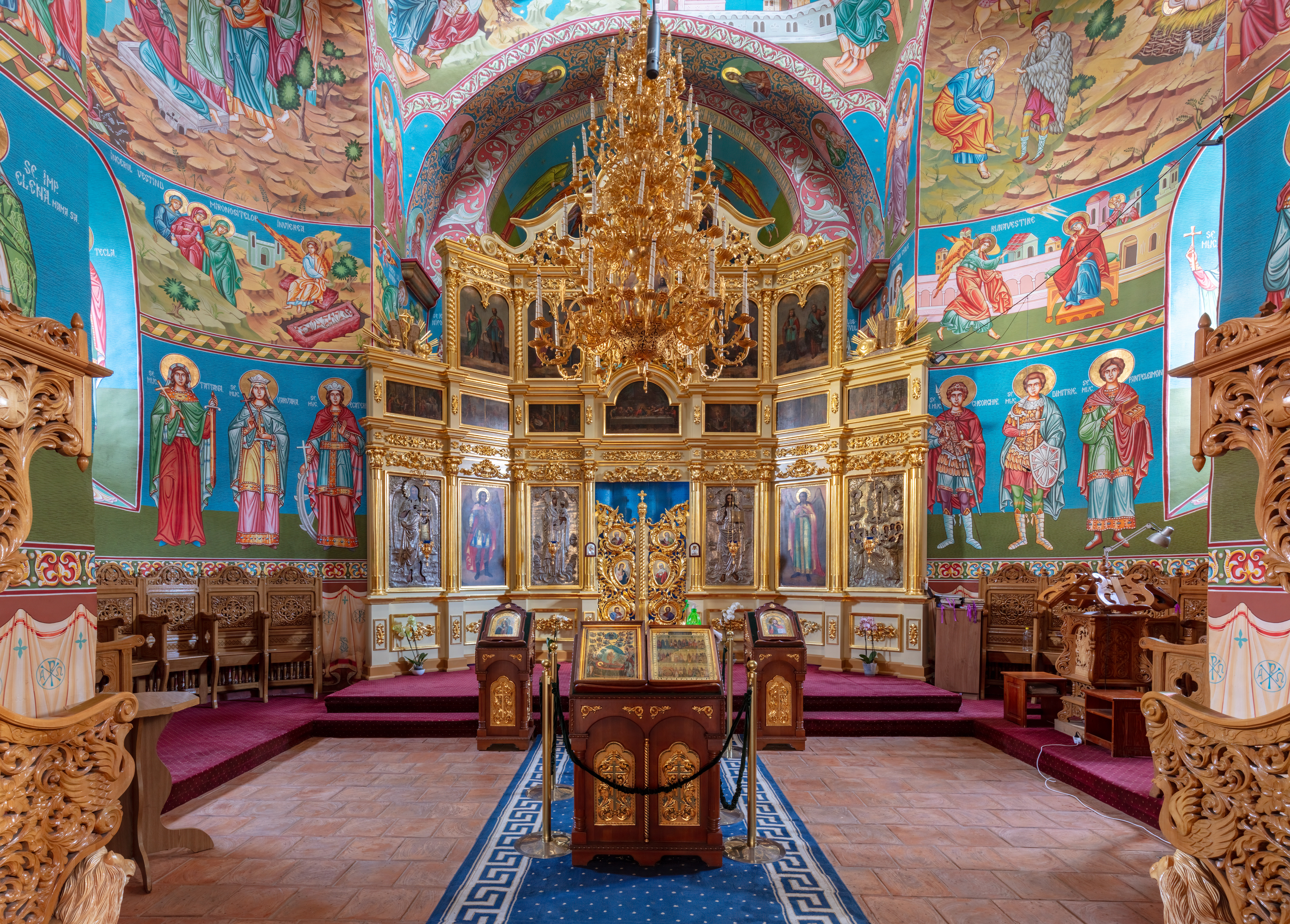
Iconostasis

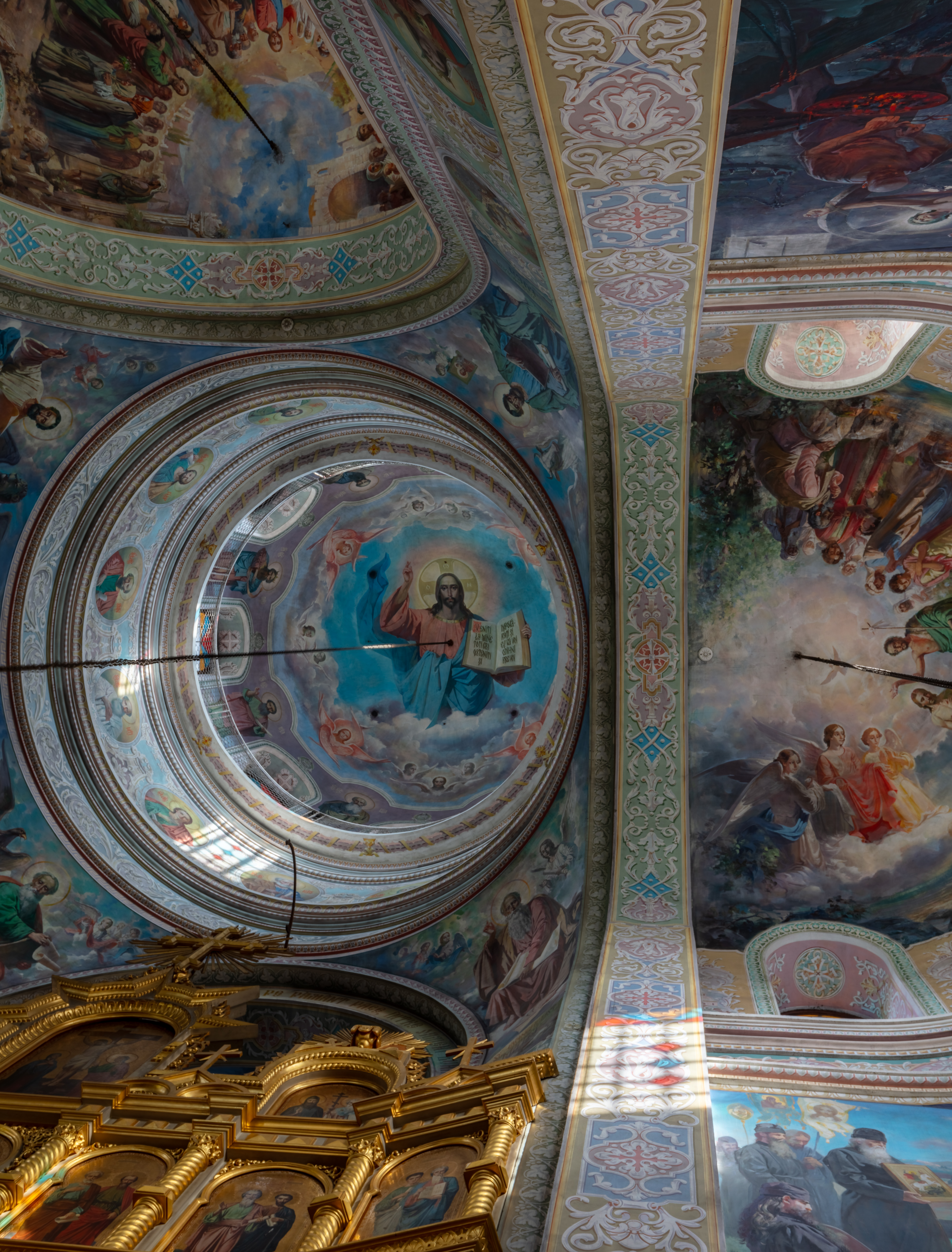
Ceiling
