= Bîc =

Right tributary of the Dniester

Bîc (Bâc)
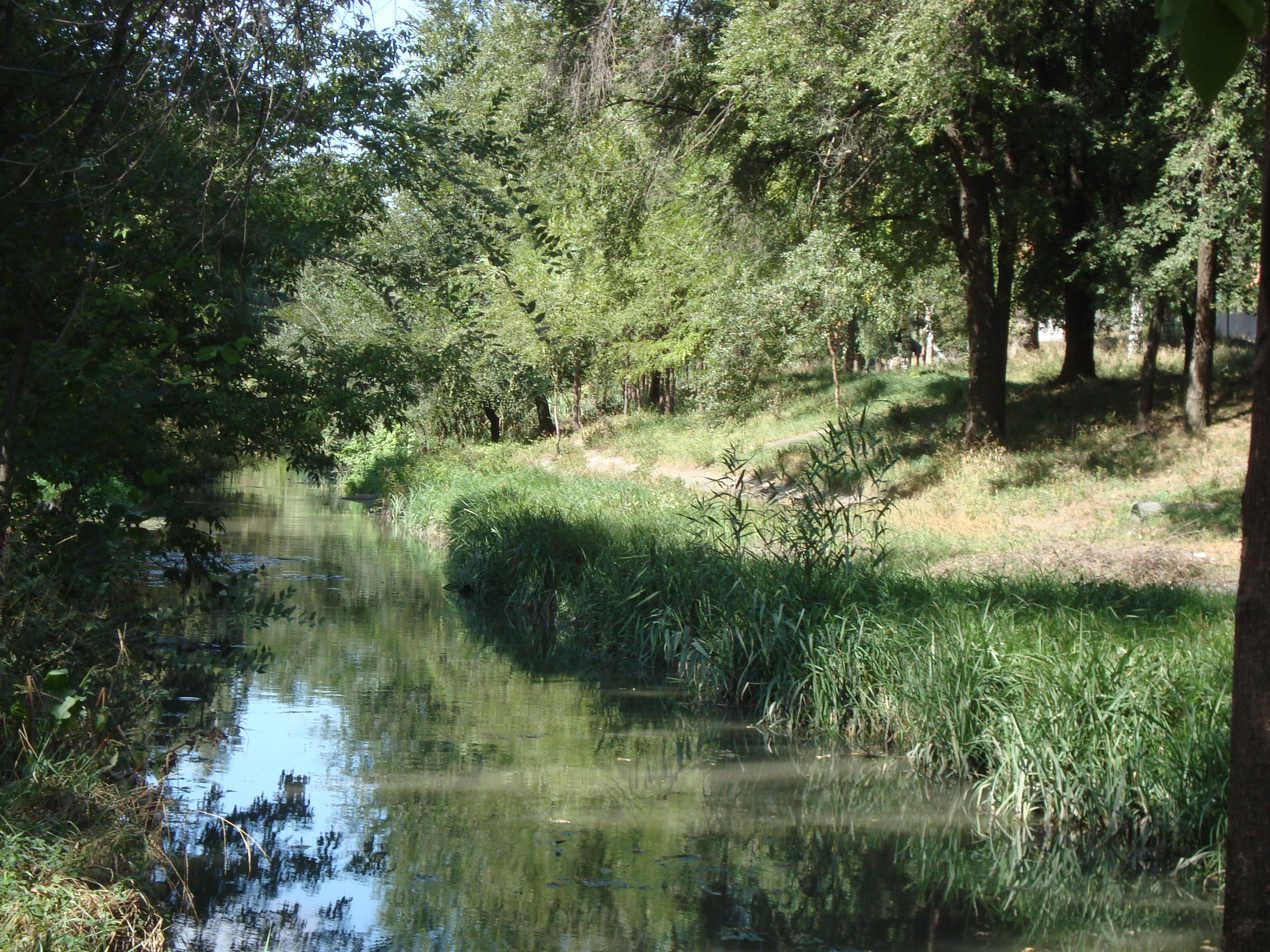

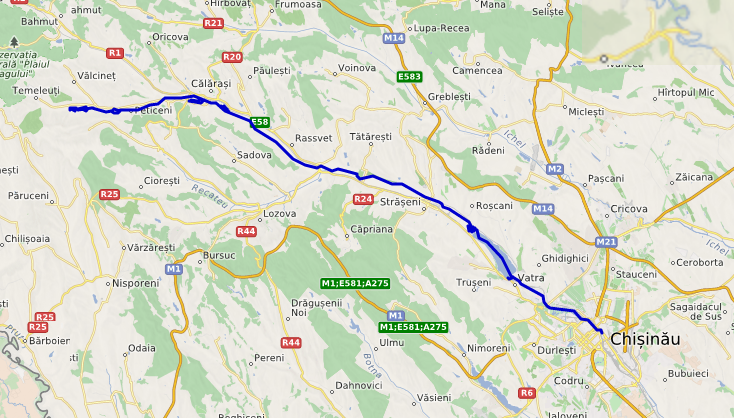

Location
- Country: Moldova

Physical characteristics
- Source
  - location: Codri
- Mouth
  - location: Dniester
  - coordinates: 46°54′42″N 29°27′59″E
- Length: 155 km (96 mi)
- Basin size: 2,150 km^{2} (830 sq mi)
- Discharge
  - average: 1 m^{3}/s (35 cu ft/s) (annual mean); 220 m^{3}/s (7,800 cu ft/s) (springtime)

Basin features
- Progression: Dniester→ Dniester Estuary→ Black Sea

Bîc (also spelled Bâc, pronunciation: [bɨk]) is a river in Moldova, a right tributary of the Dniester.

== Geography ==
The Bâc originates in a spring in the village of Temeleuți in west central Moldova. As it flows west and south, the upper Bâc cuts a deep canyon in the Codri Hills. It then flows through the town of Strășeni into the Chișinău Sea reservoir, about 20 km to the north and west of Chișinău, the capital of Moldova. The river then flows through Chișinău, along the northern edge of the city center. After departing Chișinău, it flows further south and west through the town of Anenii Noi, and then empties into the Dnistr near the village of Gura Bîcului ("mouth of the Bîc").

== History ==
There are a number of local legends associated with the Bâc. At its origin, the spring is said to have arisen from the tears of a giantess. Rock formations in the Codri Hills are said to be the remains of a wall built by devils in an unsuccessful attempt to dam the river.

The Bâc was never navigable above Anenii Noi, but it was an important source of water and fish for local communities. Floods were frequently a problem, with a particularly heavy flood doing extensive damage in July 1948.

The character of the river changed dramatically during Moldova's Soviet period (1944–1991). First, the Soviets built several dams, with the largest one, the Ghidighici Dam, creating the Chișinău Sea above Chișinău. This reservoir, created in 1962–3, has an area of about 10 km^{2}. It has succeeded in reducing flooding on the middle and lower Bâc. However, the Ghidighici dam has not been maintained since the Soviet period, and the reservoir is now approximately 50% filled with silt.

Second, the Soviets implemented various flood control mechanisms. Most notably, while flowing through Chișinău, the river flows for several kilometers through a concrete trough.

Third, the Soviet period saw a dramatic degradation in the quality of the river. This was partly because of deforestation and industrialization across the basin of the Bâc, and partly because the Soviet-era authorities freely dumped industrial waste and untreated sewage directly into the river.

== Current status ==
The flow of the Bâc is heavily seasonal. During the summer season, the river sometimes dries out and turns into a chain of ponds and puddles. In spring and autumn the water level can rise quite rapidly. Despite Soviet-era flood controls, local floods are still occasionally a problem on the middle and lower Bâc.

The Bâc is extremely polluted. Industries and private enterprises dump wastewater into it, and as it flows through Chișinău it receives large amounts of untreated runoff. The practice of dumping untreated sewage has been reduced but not entirely eliminated. The upper Bâc is less damaged than the lower river; a 2018 survey found that while various fish species lived in the river above Chișinău, no fish survived along the lower Bâc between Chișinău and the Dnistr. Various initiatives to clean the river have come under discussion, but none have taken place. Volunteers will occasionally clean up trash along the river. Swimming in the Bâc is not advisable.
