= Ghidighici Reservoir =

- Chișinău Sea
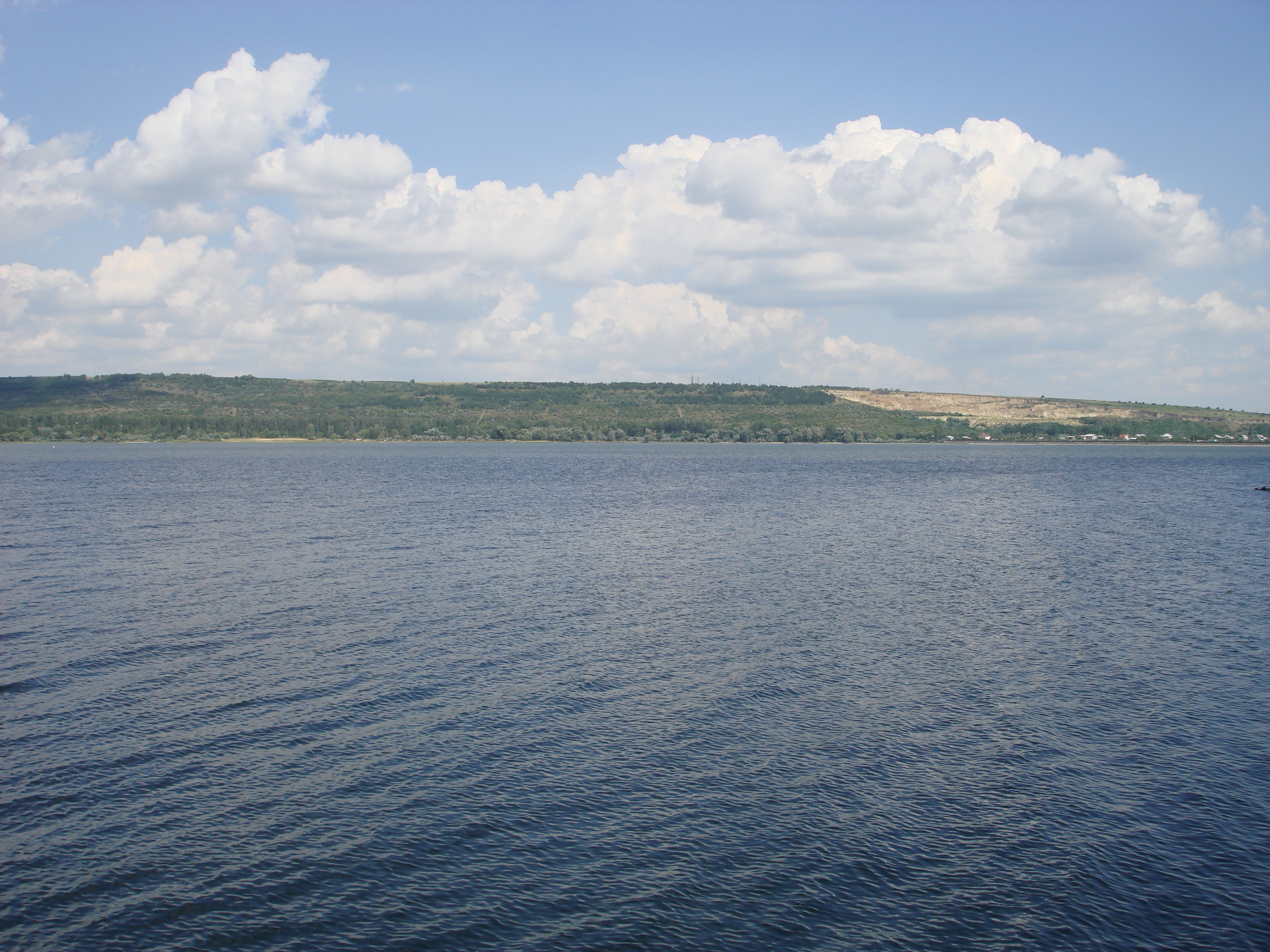
- Ghidighici Reservoir

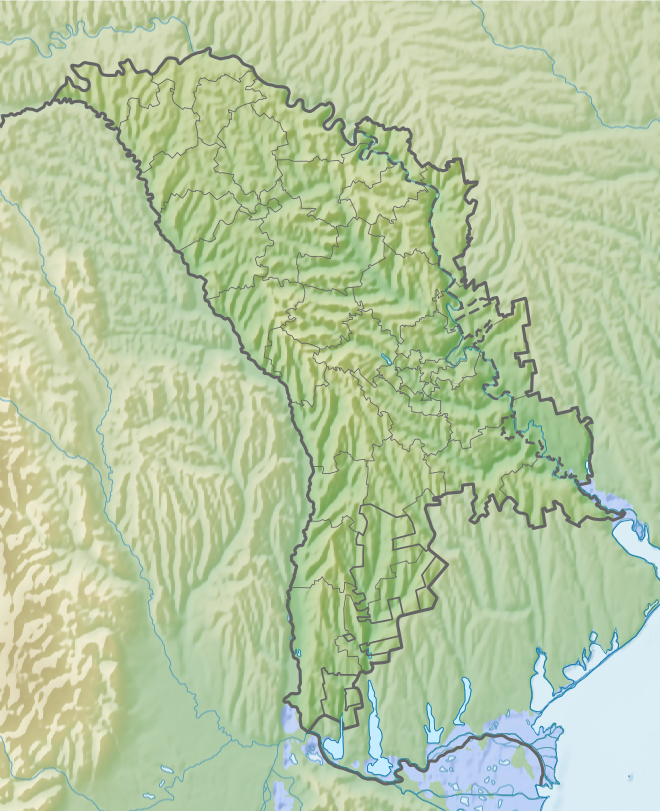
- Location within Moldova
- Location: Moldova
- Coordinates: 47°06′00″N 28°42′50″E
- Type: reservoir

The Ghidighici Reservoir (Romanian: Lacul de acumulare Ghidighici, Lacul Ghidighici), also known as the Chișinău Sea (Romanian: Marea Chișinăului), is a reservoir on the Bîc River in Moldova, 12 km from the capital, Chișinău. The reservoir was built between 1962 and 1963, during the Soviet period of Moldova, for purposes of flood control and to provide water for irrigation.

The reservoir has significantly reduced flooding, although there are still occasional floods on the middle and lower Bîc. However, as of 2020, siltation had reduced the volume of the reservoir by about 50%. Furthermore, the dam has not been maintained since the Soviet period, and has become increasingly dilapidated.

The reservoir is named after Ghidighici village which is situated nearby.
