= Oleg Komov =

Russian sculptor

- Born: 16 July 1932; Moscow, Soviet Union
- Died: 3 September 1994 (aged 62); Moscow, Russia

Oleg Konstantinovich Komov (Russian: Оле́г Константи́нович Ко́мов; 16 July 1932 – 3 September 1994) was a prominent Soviet-Russian sculptor and graphics artist.

== Biography ==
Oleg Komov was born on 16 July 1932 in Moscow.

1948–1953 studied at Moscow Art School in memory of 1905.

1953–1959 studied at Surikov Art Institute by Nikolai Tomsky.

Since 1959 member and since 1968 member of the directorial board of Artists' Union of the USSR.

Since 1962 member of CPSU.

Since 1975 associate, 1988 member and member of the directorial board of Academy of Arts of the USSR (Imperial Academy of Arts)

Since 1992 professor of sculpture at Surikov Art Institute.

Died on 3 September 1994, buried in Kuntsevo Cemetery in Moscow.

== Work ==
Up to 1970s Komov mostly created indoor sculpture works.

Starting from mid-1970s Komov created dozens of monuments in Moscow and other places in the USSR to prominent Russian artists, politicians and historical figures.

Komov's works usually have laconic forms and chamber scale. His monuments also usually fit the architectural and historical context where they were placed. Persons depicted in his monuments typically have details or items relating the person to their historical context.

== Awards ==
- People's Artist of the USSR (1987)
- People's Artist of the RSFSR (1976)
- Honoured Artist of the RSFSR (1970)
- USSR State Prize (1981) – for Alexey Venetsianov monument in Vyshny Volochyok
- Государственная премия РСФСР имени И. Е. Репина (1974) – for Pushkin monuments
- Премия имени Дж. Неру (1988)

== Works (selected) ==
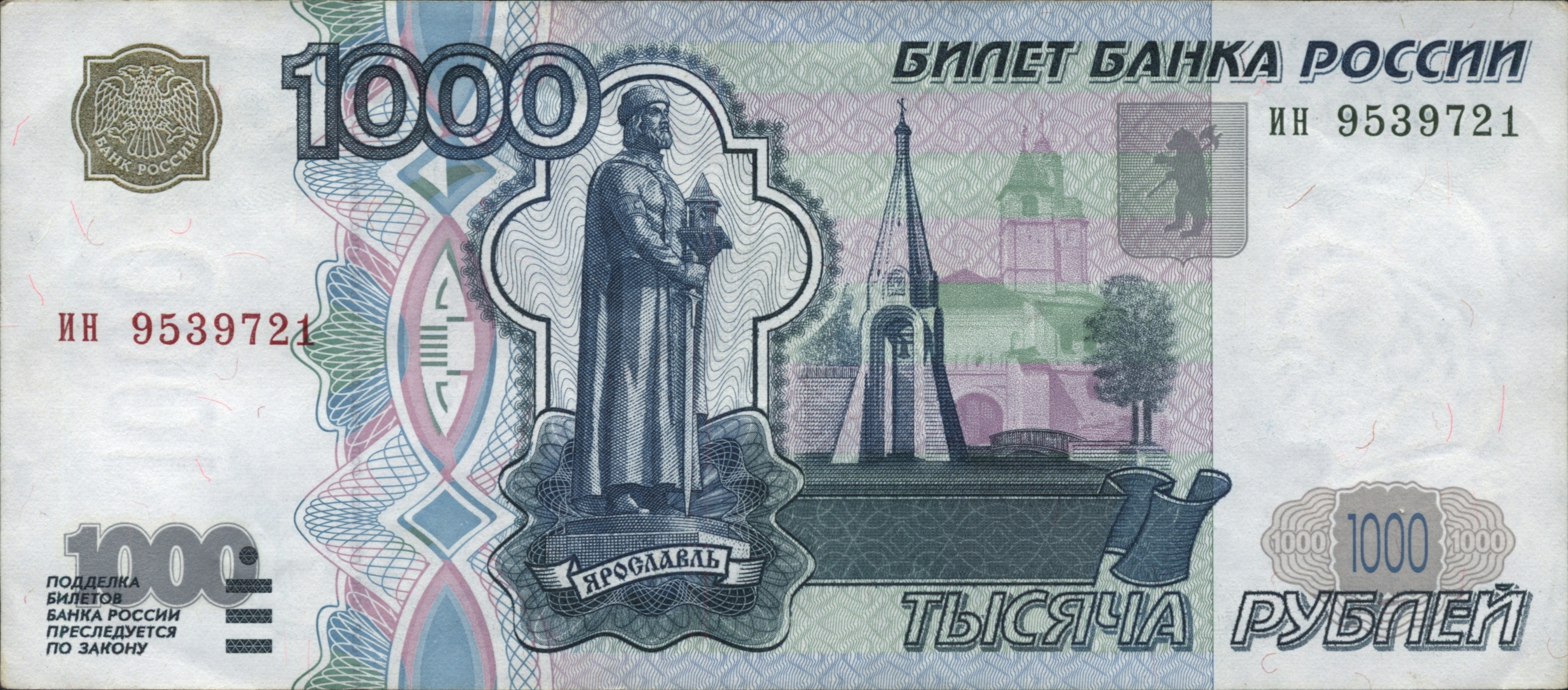
Komov's Yaroslav the Wise monument in Yaroslavl, depicted on 1000-ruble note.

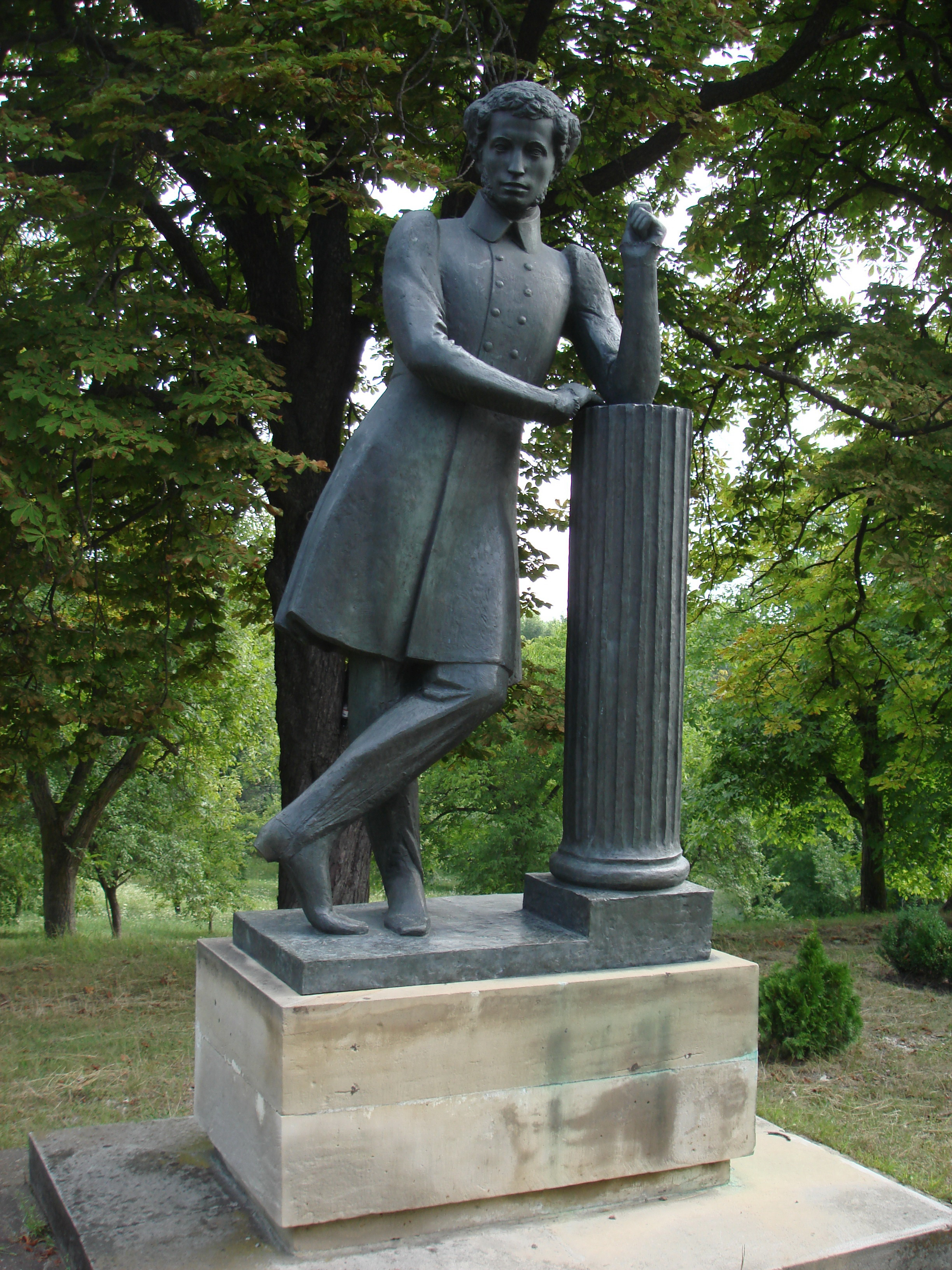
Pushkin monument in Dolna, Strășeni.

== Links ==
- Komov's sculpture "Glass", 1958 in Tretyakov Gallery in Moscow
- Komov's monument to Minin in Nizhniy Novgorod on a 2002 Russian post stamp
- "Soviet sculptor Oleg Komov" on soviet-art.ru
- Komov's biography at RusArtNet
- Komov's monuments to Russian writers and musicians on RussianLandmarks
- Komov's sculptures at ILoveFigireSculpture
- Savva Yamshchikov Олег Комов: «Моя жизнь – творчество» (Вспоминая русского мастера)
- Морозов В. Ваятель. // Наш современник. – 2003. – № 4.
- Скульптор Олег Комов. Радио Маяк, 2003
- Культпоход № 2
- Энциклопедия Кирилла и Мефодия
- Культурное наследие земли Смоленской
- Ему помогало небо. Выставка в Академии хуожеств
- О чём рассказывает банкнота. Наука и жизнь, № 12, 2008
- Сполна ли отдана земная дань… Олегу Комову исполнилось бы 70 лет
- ПУШКИНИАНА. О выставке в Государственном музее А. С. Пушкина (на Арбате)
- Скульптурные портреты А. С. Пушкина
- Достопримечательности Москвы, Сущёвский дворик
- Могила Олега Комова на Новокунцевском кладбище
- Ирина Лобанова. Народный художник РСФСР, член-корреспондент Академии художеств СССР Олег Комов: «Открыть новое» // Смена, No.1408, Январь 1986
- Алексей Касмынин. Комов навсегда (о Вечере памяти О. К. Комова в Библиотеке им. А. Ф. Лосева на Арбате) // Завтра, декабрь, 2010.
