= Dolna, Strășeni =

Dolna
- Village
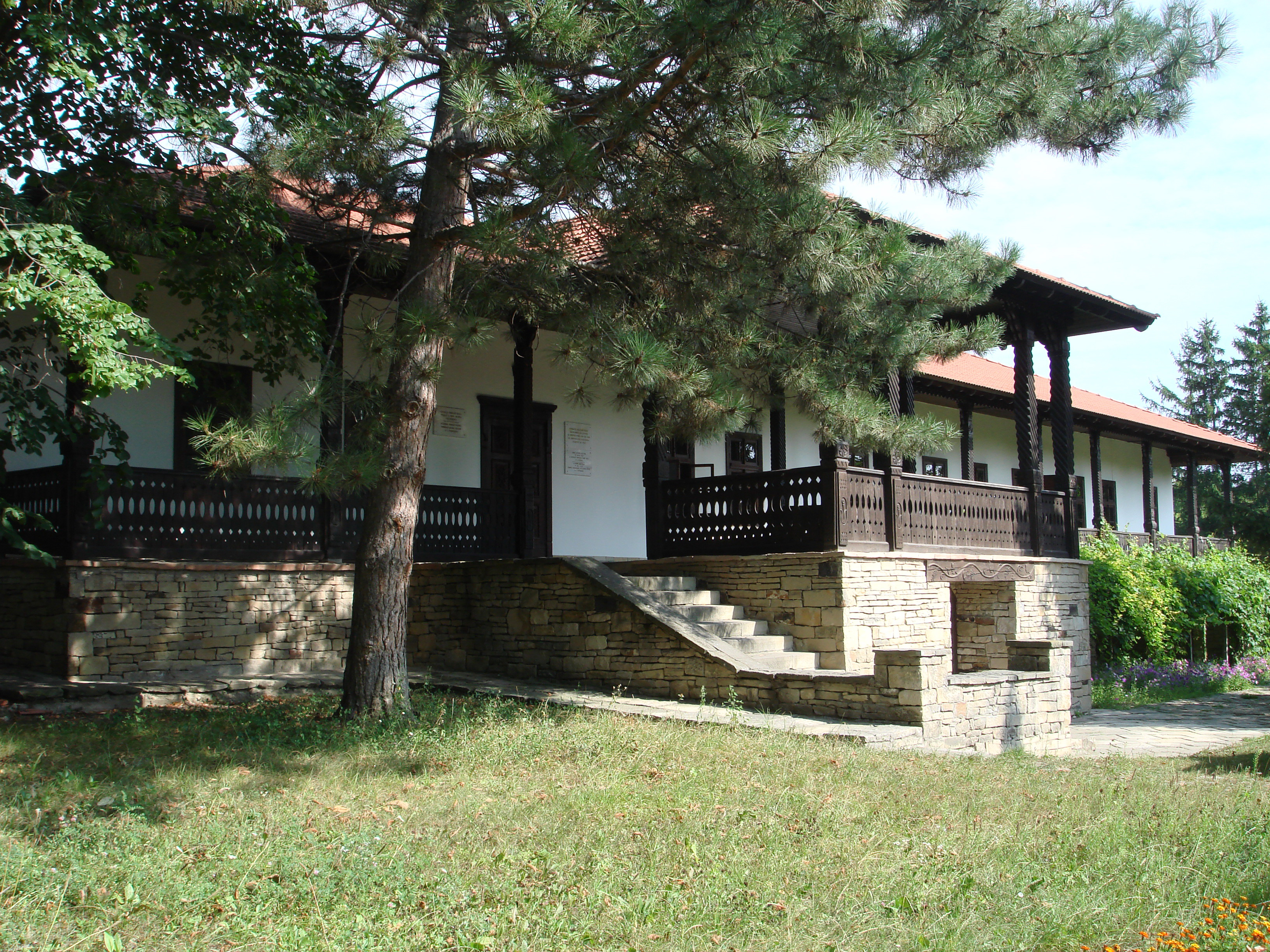
- Zamfir Ralli-Arbore Museum

- Location in Moldova
- Coordinates: 47°07′N 28°16′E
- Country: Moldova
- District: Strășeni District

Government
  - Mayor: Valentina Celacuș
- Elevation: 568 ft (173 m)

Population (2014 census)
  - Total: 1,035
- Time zone: UTC+2 (EET)
  - Summer (DST): UTC+3 (EEST)

Dolna is a village in Strășeni District, Moldova. It is located in Codri. The Dolna landscape reserves is located nearby.

During the soviet period the village was called Пушкино (Pushkino).

== Tourist attractions ==
The main attraction is the house-museum Ralli family mansion, where Alexander Pushkin lived in the summer of 1821.

In Codri, near Dolna, there are the Zemfira Spring and the Zemfira Glade where Pushkin lived for a while in a Gypsy camp, which inspired him to create the poem "The Gypsies."
