= Temeleuți, Călărași =

Temeleuți
- Village
- Location within Moldova
- Coordinates: 47.2483333333°N 28.0783333333°E
- Country: Moldova
- District: Călărași District

Government
  - Mayor: Zinaida Țurcanu (PDM)

Population (2014 census)
  - Total: 1,384
- Time zone: UTC+2 (EET)
  - Summer (DST): UTC+3 (EEST)

Temeleuți is a village in Călărași District, Moldova.
