= List of palaces and manor houses in Moldova =

This is the List of palaces and manor houses in Moldova.

This list does not include castles, fortresses and other historical fortifications, which are listed in a separate article.

This list also does not include those historical manor houses, mansions, chateaus and palaces that were once part of the historical Principality of Moldavia (one of the principal Romanian-speaking polities), but are outside the territory of modern Moldova, often in Romania.

Rural manor houses and mansions are referred to as conacul in Romanian, Moldova's official language.

== List ==
Manor houses, mansions and palaces located within the unrecognized breakaway territory of Transnistria (on the left bank of the Dniester river) are indicated in grey.

Image	Name	Settlement	District / Municipality	Established	Status	Type	Notes
	Urban mansion of A. F. Stuart	Chișinău	Chișinău Municipality		Preserved	Town mansion	Designated as an architectural monument of local importance in Moldova.
	Mansion of Apostolopulo in Saharna	Saharna Nouă	Rezina District		Abandoned In need of restoration works	Rural mansion	Designated as an architectural monument of local importance in Moldova.
	Urban mansion at Alexei Mateevici Street, no. 31	Chișinău	Chișinău Municipality		Preserved	Town mansion	Designated as an architectural monument of national importance in Moldova.
	Urban mansion at Alexei Șciusev Street, no. 47	Chișinău	Chișinău Municipality		Preserved	Town mansion	Designated as an architectural and historical monument of national importance in Moldova.
	Balioz family manor house	Ivancea	Orhei District		Restored	Rural mansion	Designated as an architectural monument of national importance in Moldova.
	Biberi mansion	Rujnița	Ocnița District		Abandoned In need of restoration works	Rural mansion	Designated as an architectural monument of national importance in Moldova.
	Bogdasarov mansion	Piatra, Orhei	Orhei District		Abandoned In need of restoration works	Rural mansion	Designated as an architectural monument of national importance in Moldova.
	Bjozowskz mansion in Soloneț	Soloneț	Soroca District		Abandoned In need of restoration works	Rural mansion	Designated as an architectural monument of national importance in Moldova.
	Catargi urban mansion	Chișinău	Chișinău Municipality		Preserved	Town mansion	Designated as an architectural and historical monument of national importance in Moldova.
	Constantin Stamati mansion	Ocnița	Ocnița District	1800s	Open to the public as a memorial museum	Rural mansion	Built in the 1800s, the home of 19th century Romanian/Moldovan writer and translator Constantin Stamati. Currently houses the memorial museum of Constantin Stamati, established in 1988, which houses over 350 exhibit items (period furniture, photographs, books, newspapers and magazines) connected to C. Stamati and his descendants. Designated as a historical monument of national importance in Moldova.
	Mansion of the Cristi family in Lupa-Recea	Lupa-Recea	Strășeni District		Preserved	Mansion	Designated as an architectural and historical monument of national importance in Moldova. Added to the register of Moldovan historical and architectural landmarks in 2023.
	Mansion of the Cristi family in Teleșeu	Teleșeu	Orhei District		Abandoned In need of restoration works	Mansion	Designated as an architectural monument of national importance in Moldova.
	Cazimir-Cheșco family urban mansion	Chișinău	Chișinău Municipality		Abandoned In need of restoration works	Town mansion	Designated as an architectural and historical monument of national importance in Moldova.
	Mansion of Dinu Ruso	Păulești	Călărași District		Abandoned In need of restoration works	Mansion	Designated as an architectural and historical monument of national importance in Moldova.
	Dolivo-Dobrovolski family urban mansion	Chișinău	Chișinău Municipality		Preserved Restored Foreign embassy	Town mansion	Designated as an architectural and historical monument of national importance in Moldova. Underwent restoration works in the 2010s. Houses the Bulgarian embassy in Chișinău, Moldova.
	Dombrovski mansion in Rediul Mare	Rediul Mare	Dondușeni District		Abandoned In need of restoration works	Rural mansion	Designated as an architectural monument of national importance in Moldova.
	Mansion of the Donici family	Dubăsarii Vechi	Criuleni District		Abandoned In need of restoration works	Rural mansion	Designated as an architectural and historical monument of national importance in Moldova.
	Mansion in Ghindești	Ghindești	Florești District		Preserved	Rural mansion	Designated as an architectural monument of national importance in Moldova.
	Mansion of the Gonata family in Zberoaia	Zberoaia	Nisporeni District		Abandoned In need of restoration works	Rural mansion	Designated as an architectural and historical monument of national importance in Moldova.
	Hasnaș mansion	Sofia	Drochia District	1800s	Open to the public as a memorial museum	Rural mansion	Designated as an architectural monument of national importance in Moldova.
	Hergiu mansion	Năpadova	Florești District		Abandoned In need of restoration works	Town mansion	Designated as an architectural monument of national importance in Moldova.
	Urban mansion of Ianușevici	Chișinău	Chișinău Municipality		Preserved	Town mansion	Designated as an architectural monument of national importance in Moldova.
	Inglezi urban mansion	Chișinău	Chișinău Municipality		Restored	Town mansion	Designated as an architectural and historical monument of national importance in Moldova.
	Ivănuș mansion	Negrești	Strășeni District	1800s	Abandoned In need of restoration works	Rural mansion	Designated as an architectural monument of national importance in Moldova.
	Mansion in Izbiște	Izbiște	Criuleni District		Abandoned In need of restoration works	Rural mansion	Designated as an architectural monument of local importance in Moldova.
	Mansion of Janovski family	Gura Bîcului	Anenii Noi District		Abandoned In need of restoration works	Rural mansion	Designated as an architectural monument of local importance in Moldova.
	Mansion of Krupenski in Pavlovca	Larga (Pavlovca locality)	Briceni District		Abandoned In need of restoration works	Mansion Manor house	Designated as an architectural monument of national importance in Moldova.
	Leonardi-Buznea mansion in Ciuciulea	Orhei	Orhei District		Undergoing restoration works	Rural mansion Manor house	Designated as an architectural monument of national importance in Moldova.
	Leonardi-Buznea mansion in Ciuciulea	Ciuciulea	Glodeni District		Abandoned In need of restoration works	Mansion Manor house	Designated as an architectural monument of national importance in Moldova.
	Leonardi mansion in Cubolta	Cubolta	Sîngerei District		Abandoned In need of restoration works	Rural mansion Manor house	Designated as an architectural monument of national importance in Moldova.
	Mansion of Manuc Bey	Hîncești	Hîncești District	early 1800s, 1858–1861	Opened to the public Restored	Mansion Palace	Construction was started by Murat (Ivan), the son of early 19th century Armenian trader and diplomat Manuc Bei (Manuc Bey), with Murat's nephew Grigore completing the mansion in the early 1860s. The Mansion of Manuc Bei is designated as an architectural monument of national importance in Moldova. Careful restoration works were carried out in the 2010s.
	Mansion of Meleghi in Temeleuți	Temeleuți	Florești District		Abandoned In need of restoration works	Rural mansion Manor house	Designated as an architectural monument of national importance in Moldova.
	Urban mansion at Nicolae Iorga Street, no. 20	Chișinău	Chișinău Municipality		Preserved	Town mansion	Designated as an architectural monument of national importance in Moldova.
	Urban mansion at Maria Cebotari Street, no. 6	Chișinău	Chișinău Municipality		Preserved	Town mansion	Designated as an architectural and historical monument of national importance in Moldova.
	Urban mansion at Mitropolit G. Bănulescu-Bodoni Street, no. 17	Chișinău	Chișinău Municipality		Restored	Town mansion	Designated as an architectural monument of national importance in Moldova.
	Urban mansion at Mitropolit G. Bănulescu-Bodoni Street, no. 53	Chișinău	Chișinău Municipality		Restored	Town mansion	Designated as an architectural monument of national importance in Moldova.
	Urban mansion at Mitropolit Petru Movilă Street, no. 37	Chișinău	Chișinău Municipality		Preserved Restored	Town mansion	Designated as an architectural monument of national importance in Moldova.
	Mimi family mansion	Bulboaca	Anenii Noi District	19th century	Abandoned In need of restoration works	Rural mansion	A smaller rural mansion of the Mimi winemaking family in Bulboaca, separate from the "Mimi Castle" chateau at the historic Mimi family winery. Designated as an architectural monument of national importance in Moldova.
	Nazarov family urban mansion	Chișinău	Chișinău Municipality		Abandoned In need of restoration works	Town mansion	Designated as an architectural and historical monument of national importance in Moldova.
	Mansion of Negruzzi in Tîrnova	Tirnova	Dondușeni District		Preserved	Mansion	Designated as an architectural and historical monument of national importance in Moldova.
	Mansion of Ohanowicz family in Mîndîc	Mîndîc	Drochia District		Abandoned In need of restoration works	Rural mansion Manor house	Designated as an architectural monument of national importance in Moldova.
	Urban mansion of Pisarjevski	Chișinău	Chișinău Municipality		Preserved	Town mansion	Designated as an architectural and historical monument of national importance in Moldova.
	Pommer Mansion	Țaul	Dondușeni District		Abandoned In need of restoration works	Mansion Manor house	The mansion of A. I. Pommer. Designated as an architectural monument of national importance in Moldova.
	Ponsă mansion	Glodeni	Glodeni District		Abandoned In need of restoration works	Mansion Manor house	Designated as an architectural monument of national importance in Moldova.
	Ralli family mansion	Dolna	Strășeni District	early 1800s	Open to the public as a memorial museum	Rural manor house Rural mansion	Built in the early 1800s by Zamfirache Ralli. Currently houses a museum dedicated to Alexander Pushkin, who spent some time living at the manor house in 1821, during his exile. Designated as an architectural and historical monument of national importance in Moldova.
	Mansion of Răzălăi	Răzălăi	Sîngerei District		Abandoned In need of restoration works	Rural mansion Manor house	Designated as an architectural monument of national importance in Moldova.
	Rîșcanu-Derojinski urban mansion	Chișinău	Chișinău Municipality		Restored	Town mansion Public building	Designated as an architectural and historical monument of national importance in Moldova.
	Romanov villa in Romănești	Romănești	Strășeni District		Abandoned In need of restoration works	Mansion	Designated as an architectural monument of national importance in Moldova.
	Rosetti-Roznovanu mansion in Lipcani	Lipcani	Briceni District		Abandoned In need of restoration works	Town mansion	Designated as an architectural monument of national importance in Moldova.
	Șalari family mansion in Miclești	Miclești	Criuleni District		Preserved	Rural mansion	Designated as an architectural monument of national importance in Moldova.
	Urban mansion at Serghei Lazo Street, no. 14	Chișinău	Chișinău Municipality		Preserved	Town mansion	Designated as an architectural monument of national importance in Moldova.
	Urban mansion at Sfatul Țării Street, no. 37	Chișinău	Chișinău Municipality		Preserved	Town mansion	Designated as an architectural monument of national importance in Moldova.
	Sicard Villa	Vadul lui Vodă	Chișinău Municipality		Abandoned In need of restoration works	Mansion	Designated as an architectural monument of national importance in Moldova.
	Stremiadi mansion in Șofrîncani	Șofrîncani	Edineț District		Abandoned In need of restoration works	Rural mansion	Designated as an architectural monument of national importance in Moldova.
	Urban mansion at Tricolorului Street, no. 42	Chișinău	Chișinău Municipality		Abandoned In need of restoration works	Town mansion	Designated as an architectural and historical monument of national importance in Moldova.
	Mansion of Vasile Stroiescu in Brînzeni	Brînzeni	Edineț District		Abandoned In need of restoration works	Mansion	Designated as an architectural monument of national importance in Moldova.
	Vinogradski mansion in Iarova	Iarova, Soroca	Soroca District		Abandoned In need of restoration works	Rural mansion	Designated as an architectural monument of national importance in Moldova.
	Winery of the Mimi family (colloquially Castel Mimi, "Mimi Castle")	Bulboaca	Anenii Noi District	Late 19th century chateau / mansion, completed in 1901	Restored in the 2010s, open to the public	Palace / chateau and winery	Designated as an architectural monument of national importance in Moldova. The winery and chateau ("castle") of the Mimi family was established in 1893 and completed in 1901. The chateau was renovated between 2011 and 2016. Originally in the ownership of the Mimi winemaker family (headed by Bessarabian winemaker businessman Constantin Mimi), the "castle"'s and winery's current tenants are the Trofim family.
	Zoti urban mansion	Chișinău	Chișinău Municipality		In need of restoration works	Town mansion	Designated as an architectural and historical monument of national importance in Moldova.
	Urban mansion at 31 August 1989 Street, no. 153	Chișinău	Chișinău Municipality		Preserved	Town mansion	Designated as an architectural monument of national importance in Moldova.

== See also ==
- List of World Heritage Sites in Moldova
- List of fortifications in Moldova
- List of cities in Moldova
- Culture of Moldova

=== Related topics ===
- Romanian architecture
- Ukrainian architecture
- List of palaces in Romania
