= Orhei National Park =

National park in Moldova

- Parcul Național Orhei
- IUCN category II (national park)
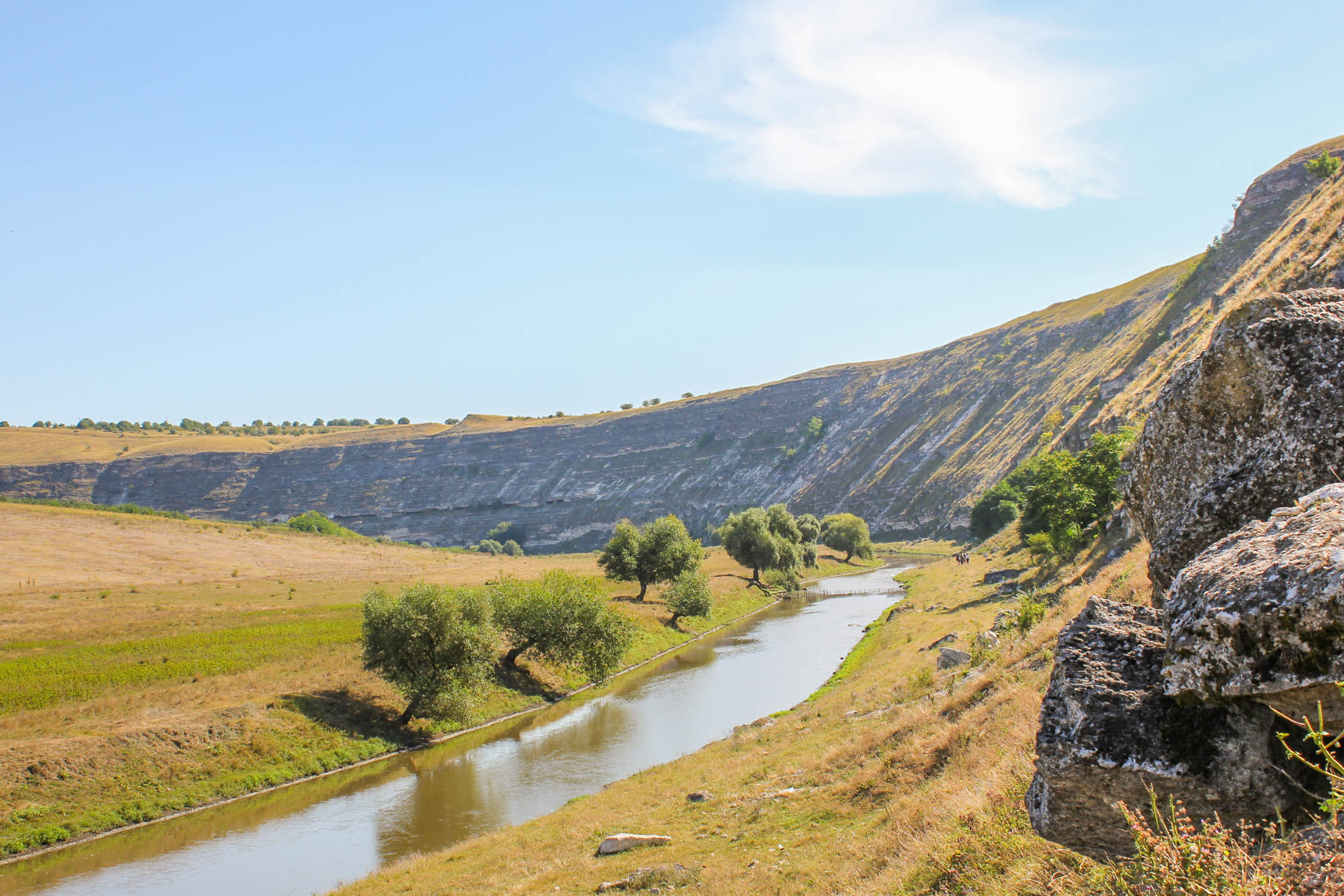

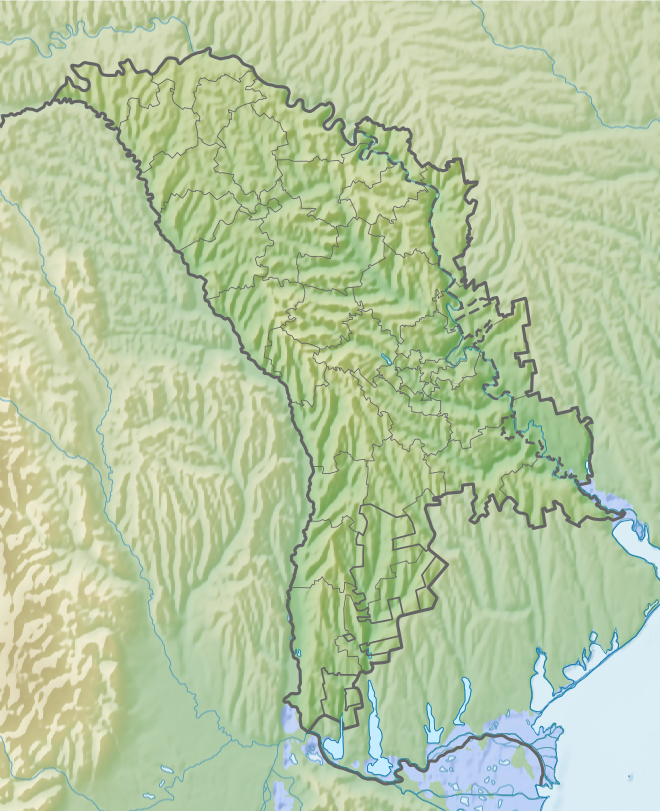
- Location within Moldova
- Location: Orhei, Strășeni, Călărași, Criuleni, Moldova
- Nearest city: Orhei
- Coordinates: 47°19′10″N 28°49′10″E
- Area: 337.92 km^{2} (130.47 sq mi)
- Designation: National Park
- Established: 2013
- Website: www.facebook.com/ParculNationalOrhei

Orhei National Park (Romanian: Parcul Național Orhei) is a national park in the central part of Moldova. It is located 46 kilometres (29 mi) north of Chișinău, in the vicinity of Orhei. Until the creation of the Orhei National Park in 2013, Moldova did not have a single national park.

== History and location ==
The park is located in Codri, the forested area in the hilly part of central Moldova. Its total area, 33,792.09 ha (83,502.1 acres), constitutes about 1% of the area of the Republic of Moldova. The landscape of the park is hilly, partly covered with forest. The territory is crossed by valleys and the Răut River flows through the park.

The main tourist attractions of the Orhei National Park are the Trebujeni landscape reserve, the main part of the Curchi tract (Mănăstirea Curchi), the Țigănești landscape reserve, a number of ancient archaeological sites, the city of the Golden Horde Shehr al-Jedid, a Moldovan medieval city with a fortress, 5 monasteries (including Old Orhei, Curchi, Țigănești), 4 noble estates, other interesting objects. Localities within the park include Ghetlova, Morozeni, Neculăieuca, Ivancea, Persecina, Donici, Teleșeu, Pohorniceni, Puțintei, Trebujeni, Seliște, Vatici, Codreanca, Romănești, Țigănești, Bravicea, Săseni, and Mașcăuți. A small museum of folk crafts is open in Ivancea.

Cultural and natural reserve Old Orhei (Romanian: Orheiul Vechi) is a candidate for inclusion to the list of UNESCO World Heritage Sites since 2017.

A number of tourist routes have been laid on the territory of Orhei Park, including routes for motorists, routes for cyclists, pedestrians and climbers.

== Gallery ==
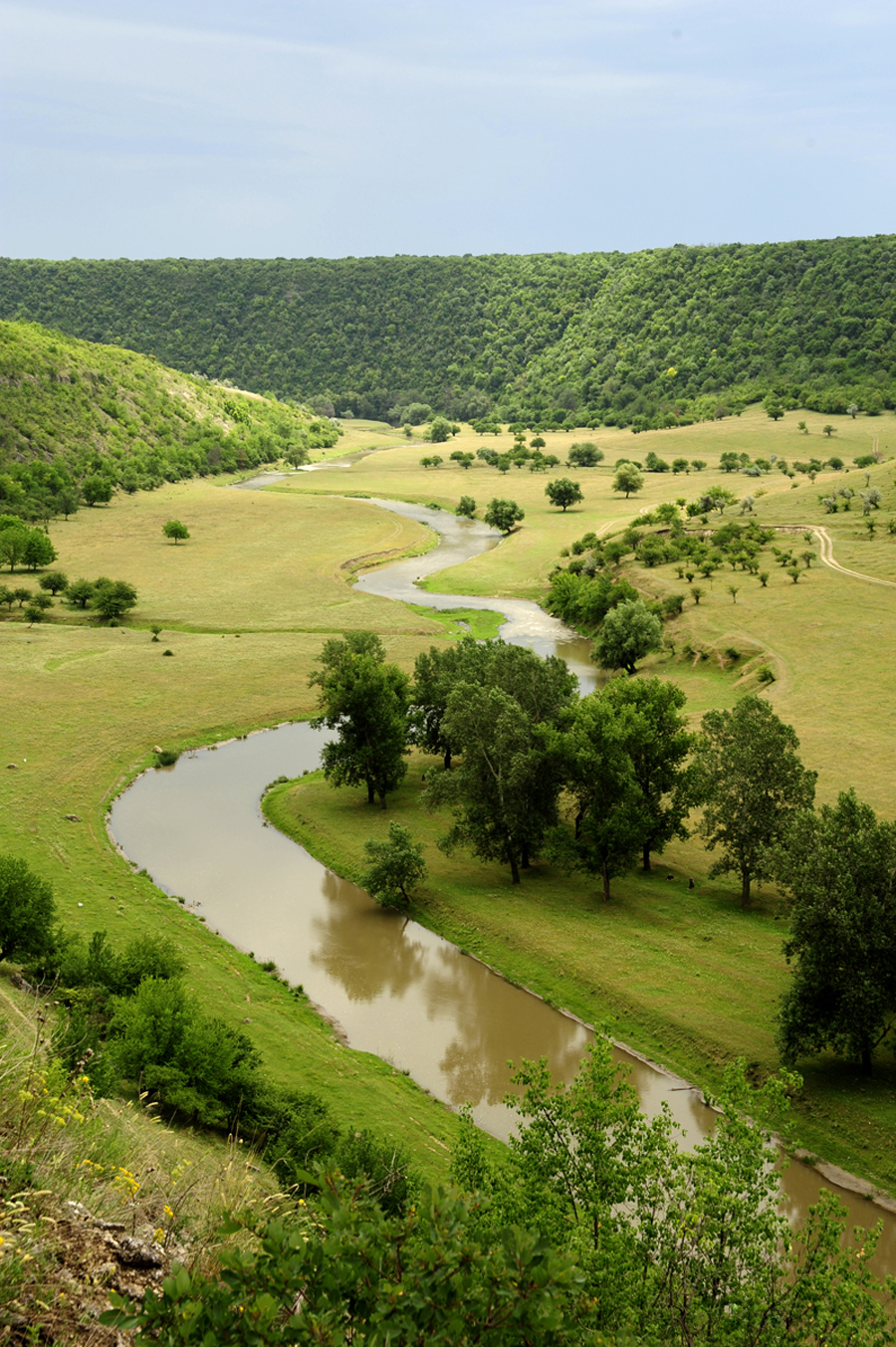
Trebujeni reserve

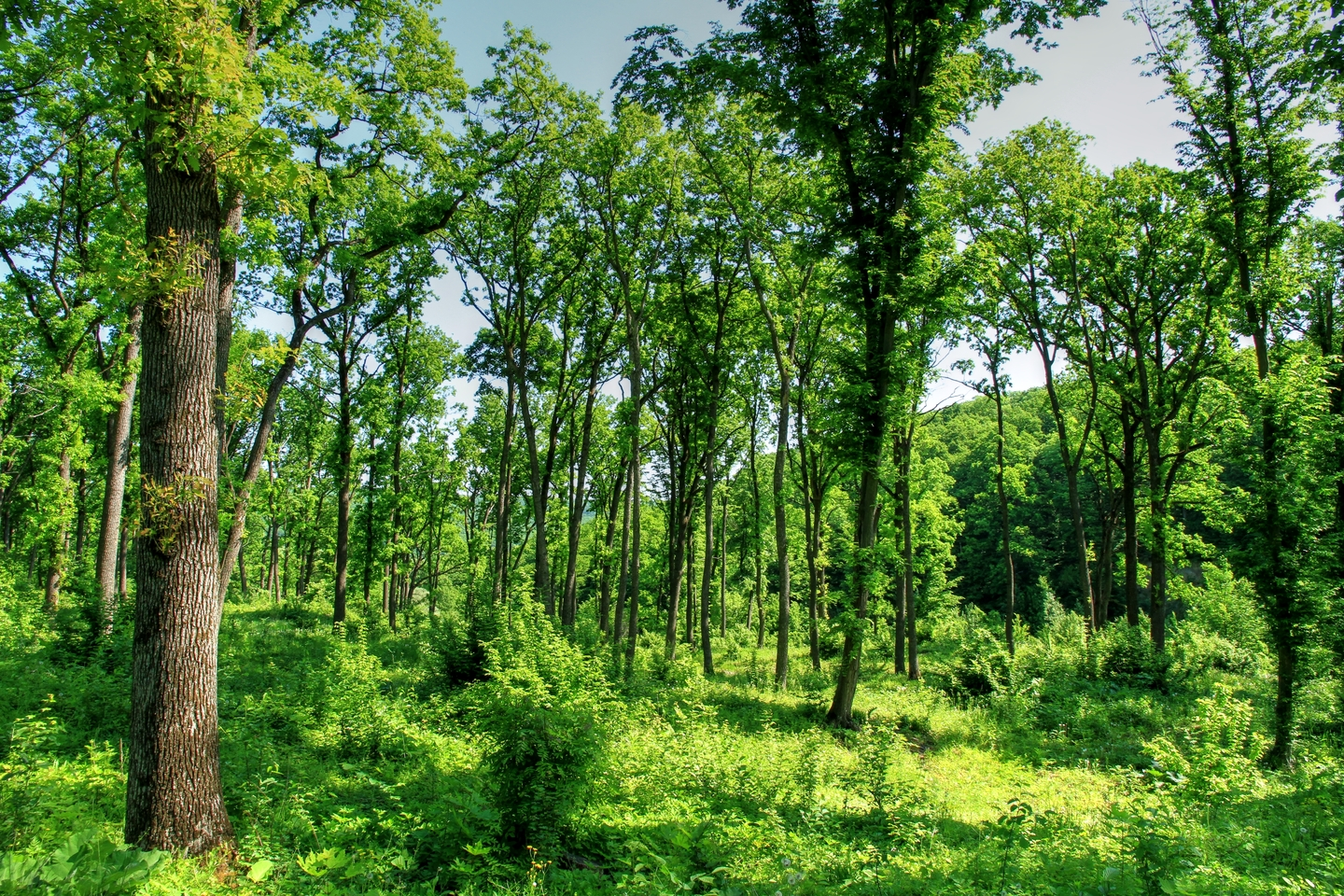
Forest in Țigănești

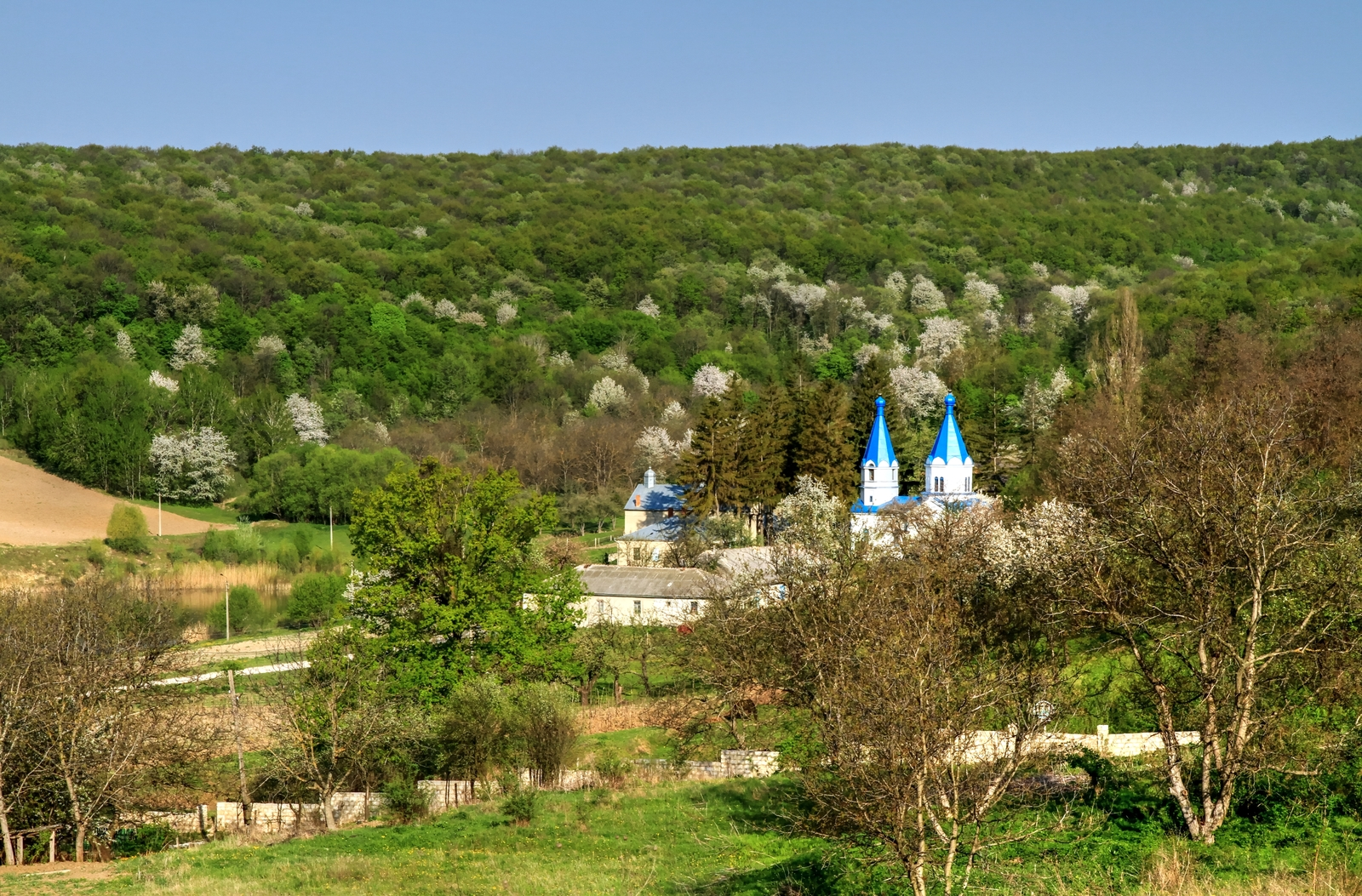
Țigănești monastery

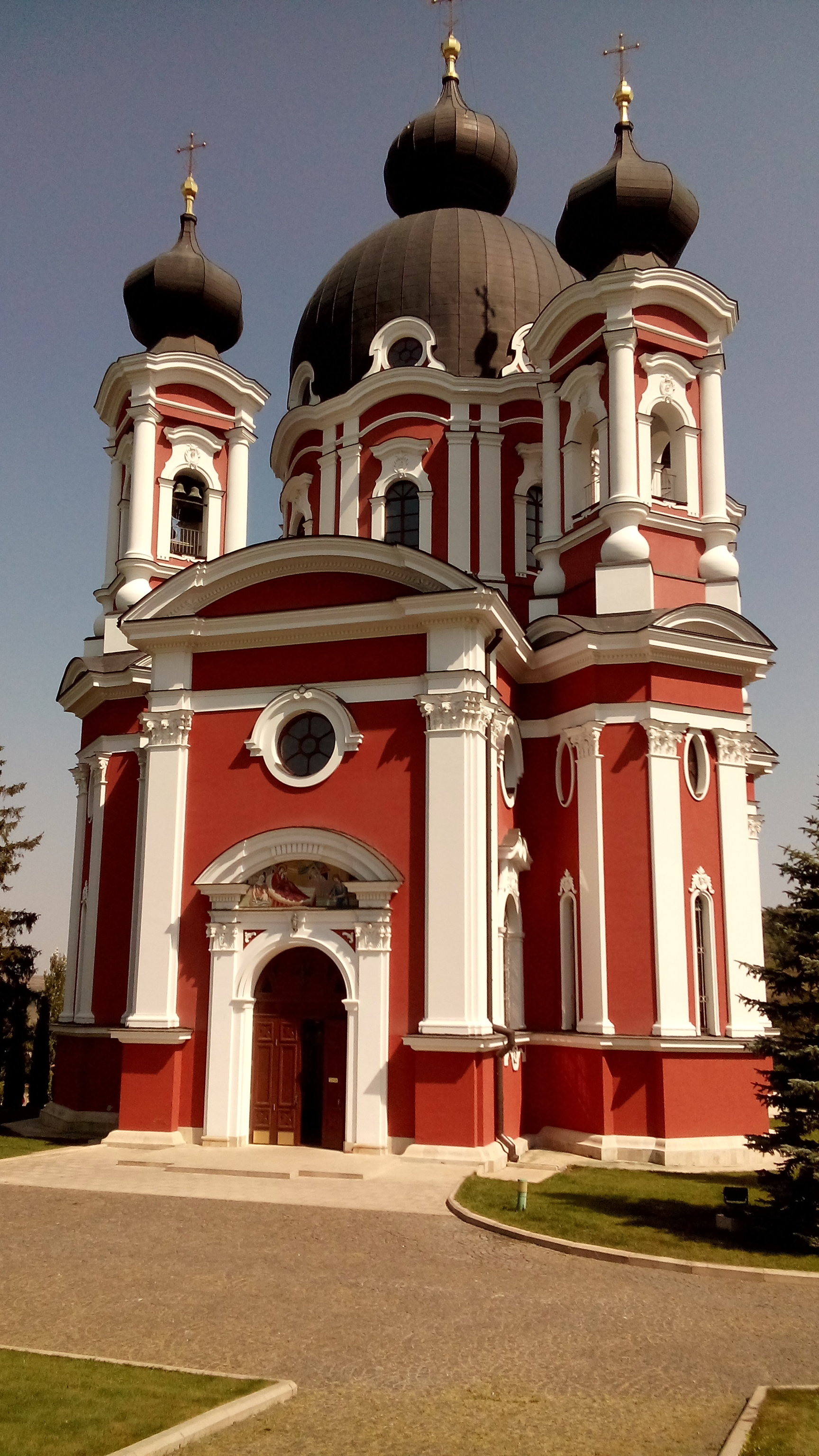
Curchi monastery

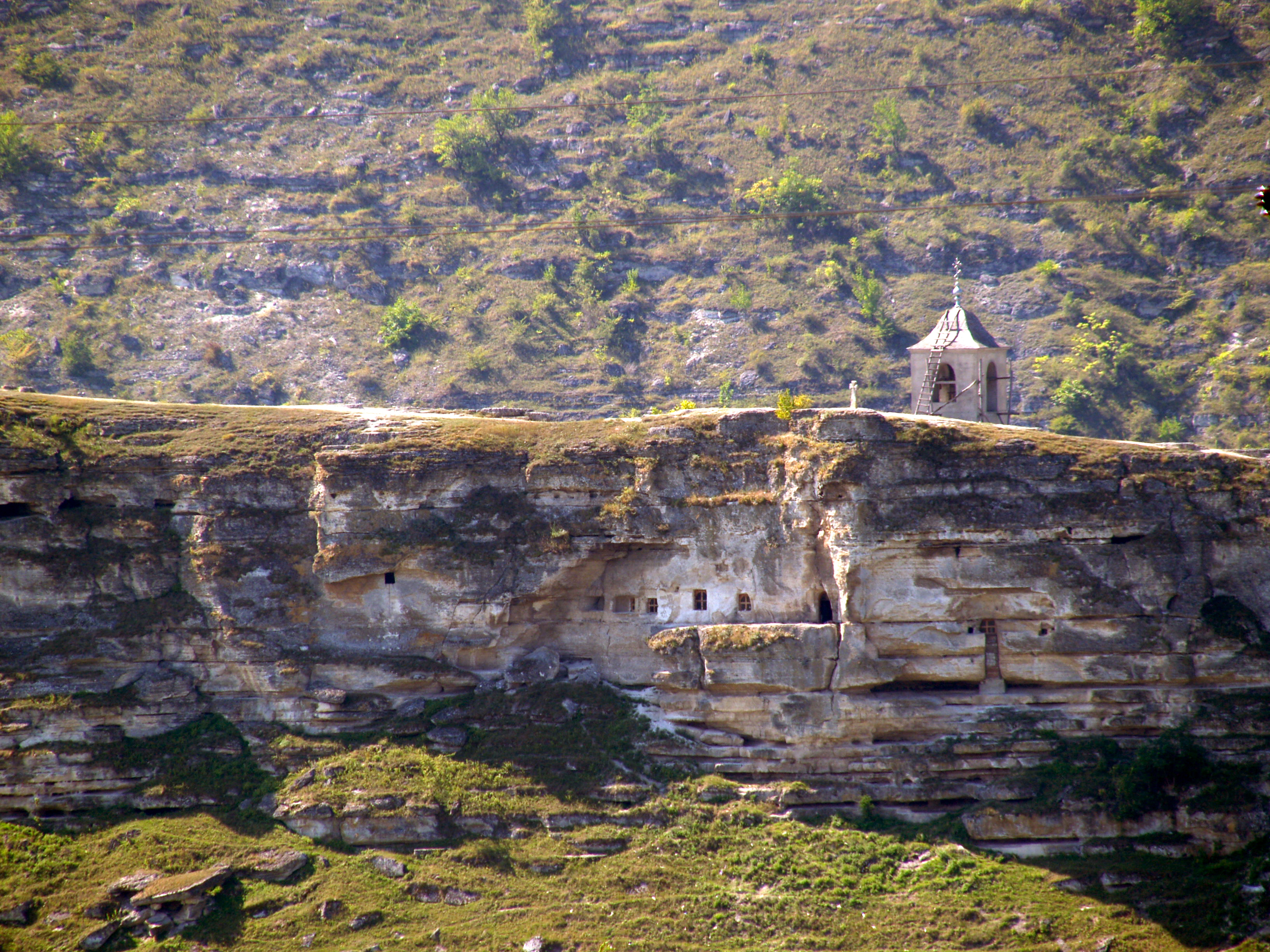
Caves in Old Orhei

== See also ==
- Old Orhei
- Orhei Fort
- Protected areas of Moldova
