= List of fortifications in Moldova =

This is a list of fortifications in Moldova. The list includes preserved structures and the remains (ruins) of historical military constructions of a fortified nature; fortresses, castles, towers, etc.

This list does not include the historical fortifications that were once part of the historical Principality of Moldavia (one of the principal Romanian-speaking polities), but are outside the territory of modern Moldova, often in Romania.

This list also does not include palaces and manor houses, which are listed in a separate article, unless they were constructed wholly on the location of a defunct fortified structure.

== List ==
Fortifications located within the unrecognized breakaway territory of Transnistria (on the left bank of the Dniester river) are indicated in grey.

Image	Name	Settlement	District / Municipality	Established	Status	Type	Notes
	Bender Fortress, Tighina Fortress (Cetatea Tighina, Cetatea Bender)	Bender (Tighina)	City of Bender (de facto municipality, not recognized by Moldova)	15th century (earlier fortress) 16th century (after 1538, current fortress)	Partially restored Museum exhibits	Fortress	Built to protect the town of Tighina/Bender and local trade routes from enemy incursions. The original, smaller fort, was established in Tighina during the 15th century by Stephen III the Great. The full stone fortress was built after 1538, when the Ottoman Empire captured the town of Tighina, renaming it Bender/Bendery. After 1812, the fortress began to lose its previous military significance. The fortress is currently located within the unrecognized breakaway territory of Transnistria.
	Chișinău Prison Castle	Chișinău	Municipality of Chișinău	1840s-1850s (construction)	Defunct, some remains	Prison fortress Fortified prison	Fortified prison built in Chișinău in the 19th century. Designed by Swiss architect Giorgio Toriсelli in 1834, completed by the 1850s. No longer in use since the 1940s.
	Orhei Fort (Cetatea Orhei)	Old Orhei (former) Trebujeni (present)	Orhei District	1460s	Defunct, Ruins	Bastion fortress Castle	Built during the reign of Stephen the Great, the fortress was located at the town of Old Orhei (now in ruins), near the present day village of Trebujeni. Though known from historical dioramas, only the ruins of the fortresses' foundations remain in the present day. It is Moldova's oldest surviving medieval stone fortress.
	Soroca Fort (Cetatea Soroca)	Soroca	Soroca District	13th century (the oldest fort) 1499 (rebuilt as a wooden castle) 1543–1546 (rebuilt as a stone fortress)	Partially restored Some museum exhibits	Fortress Castle	Built during the reign of Stephen the Great, for guarding a strategic ford on the Dniester river, part of the local main road. The 13th-15th century wooden fortress was rebuilt into a wooden castle in 1499, then by Stephen the Great's successor Petru Rareș into a stone fort/castle during the first half of the 16th century, in the mid-1540s. The Soroca Fortress is Moldova's best preserved late-medieval and Renaissance era fortress. Conservation work was carried out in the mid-2010s. The fort houses a small number of interior exhibits, including a historical altar with Orthodox icons.
	Tiraspol Fortress (Cetatea din Tiraspol)	Tiraspol	City of Tiraspol (de facto municipality, not recognized by Moldova) de iure part of the Administrative-Territorial Units of the Left Bank of the Dniester	1790s	Defunct, Ruins	18th-19th century bastion fort	The town of Tiraspol was established by the Russian Empire in 1792, the fortress for the local military garrison was built in the 1790s and served its military role until roughly the mid-19th century. The minor remnants of the fortress are located near the city of Tiraspol, the capital of the unrecognized breakaway territory of Transnistria.

== See also ==
- Kalaur Castle, former castle in Moldova
- Cultural Heritage of Moldova
- List of World Heritage Sites in Moldova
- List of palaces and manor houses in Moldova
- List of cities in Moldova
- List of wars involving Moldova
- Culture of Moldova

=== Related topics ===
- Romanian architecture
- Ukrainian architecture
- List of castles and fortresses in Romania
- List of fortifications in Wallachia
