= Maksim Grek (footballer) =

Russian-Kazakhstani footballer

Personal information
- Date of birth: 26 May 1993 (age 33)
- Place of birth: Şofrîncani, Moldova
- Height: 1.87 m (6 ft 2 in)
- Position: Defender

Youth career
- 2007–2008: CSKA Moscow
- 2009–2010: Moscow
- 2011–2012: Khimki

Senior career*
Years	Team	Apps	(Gls)
2013	Ordabasy	1	(0)
2014	Bayterek	0	(0)
2014–2015	Meteor Balashikha		
2016–2017	Rubin Yalta	10	(0)
2018	Meteor Balashikha		
2019	Super Nova	6	(0)
2019	BFC Daugavpils	15	(0)
2020	Belshina Bobruisk	10	(0)
2021	Khujand	12	(1)
2022	SD Family		

International career
2013	Kazakhstan U21	2	(0)
- * Club domestic league appearances and goals

Maksim Grek (Russian: Максим Грек; born 25 May 1993) is a Kazakhstani former professional footballer, who also holds Russian citizenship.

== Career ==
=== Club ===
On 19 February 2021, FK Khujand announced the signing of Grek.
