= Lists of castles in Europe =

Below are lists of castles in Europe, organized by country:

== Sovereign states ==
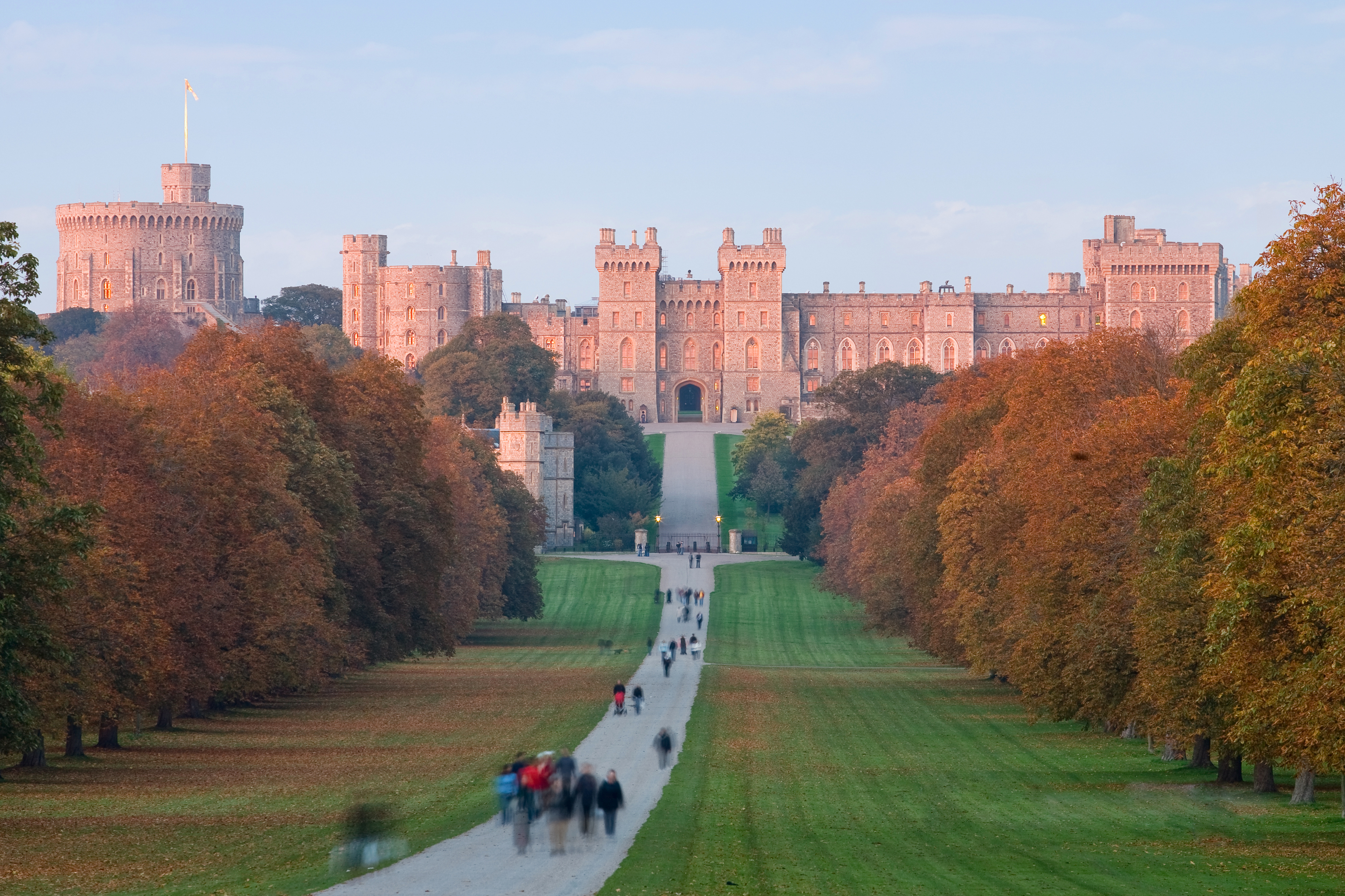
Windsor Castle, England, United Kingdom

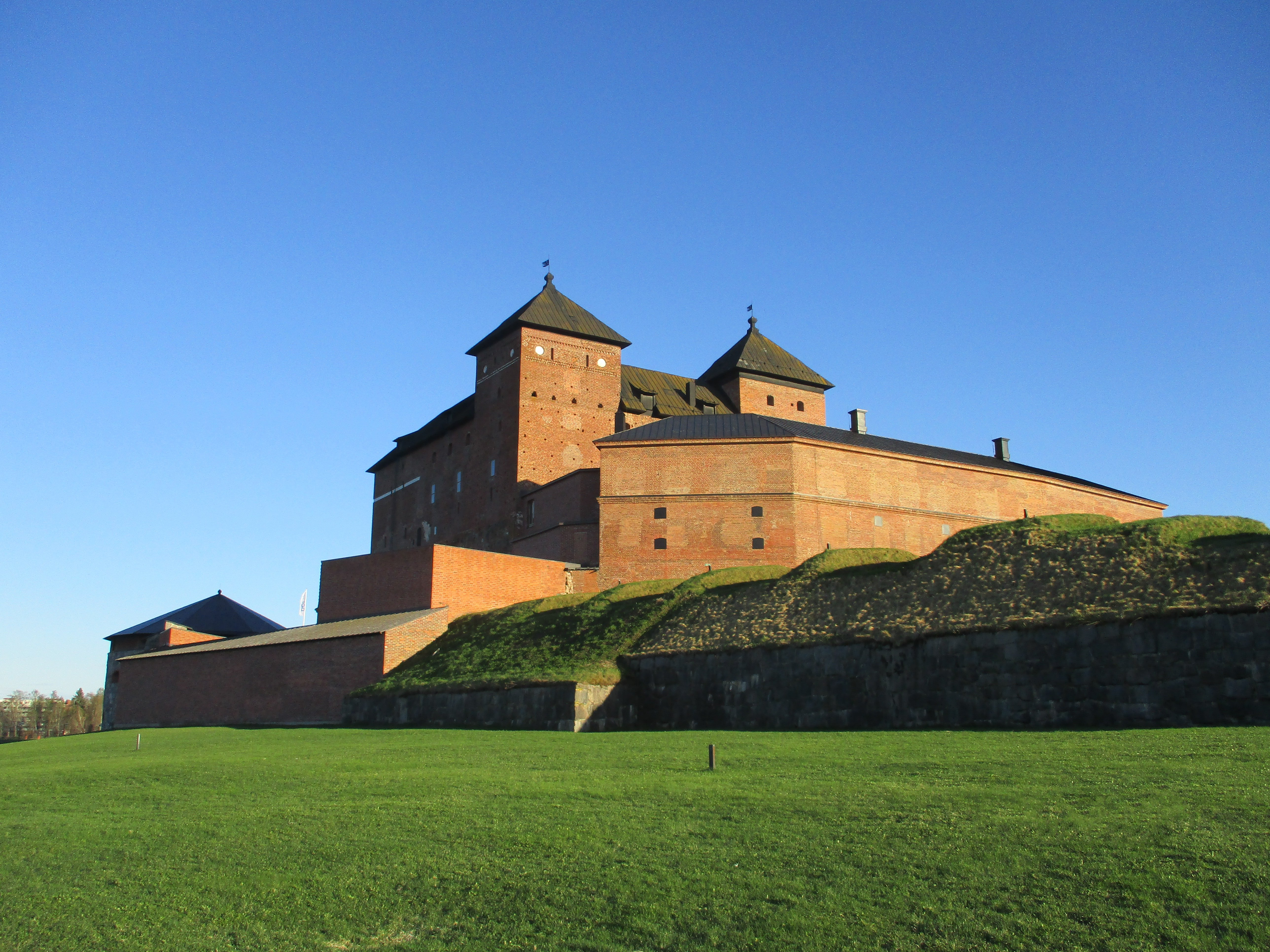
Tavastia Castle, Hämeenlinna, Finland

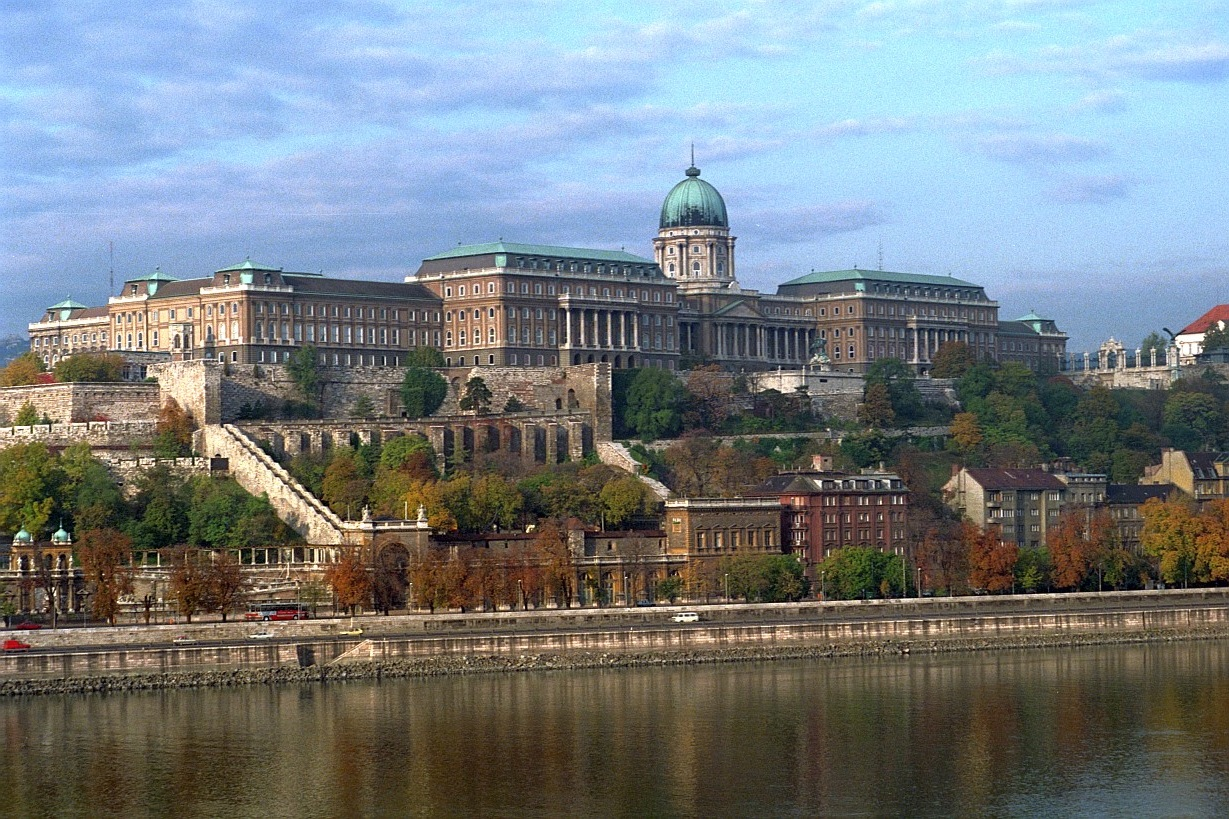
Buda Castle, Budapest, Hungary

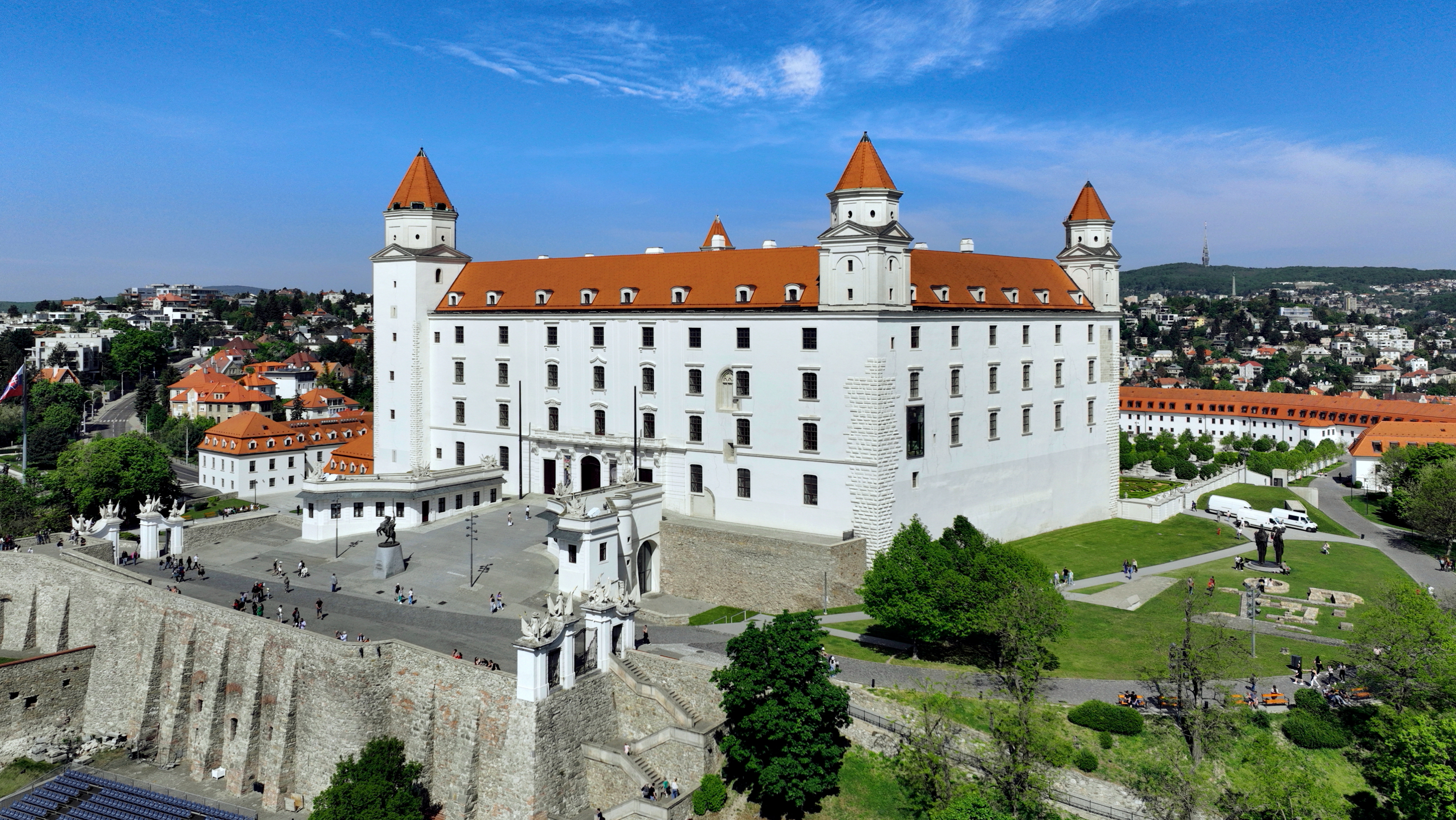
Bratislava Castle, Bratislava, Slovakia

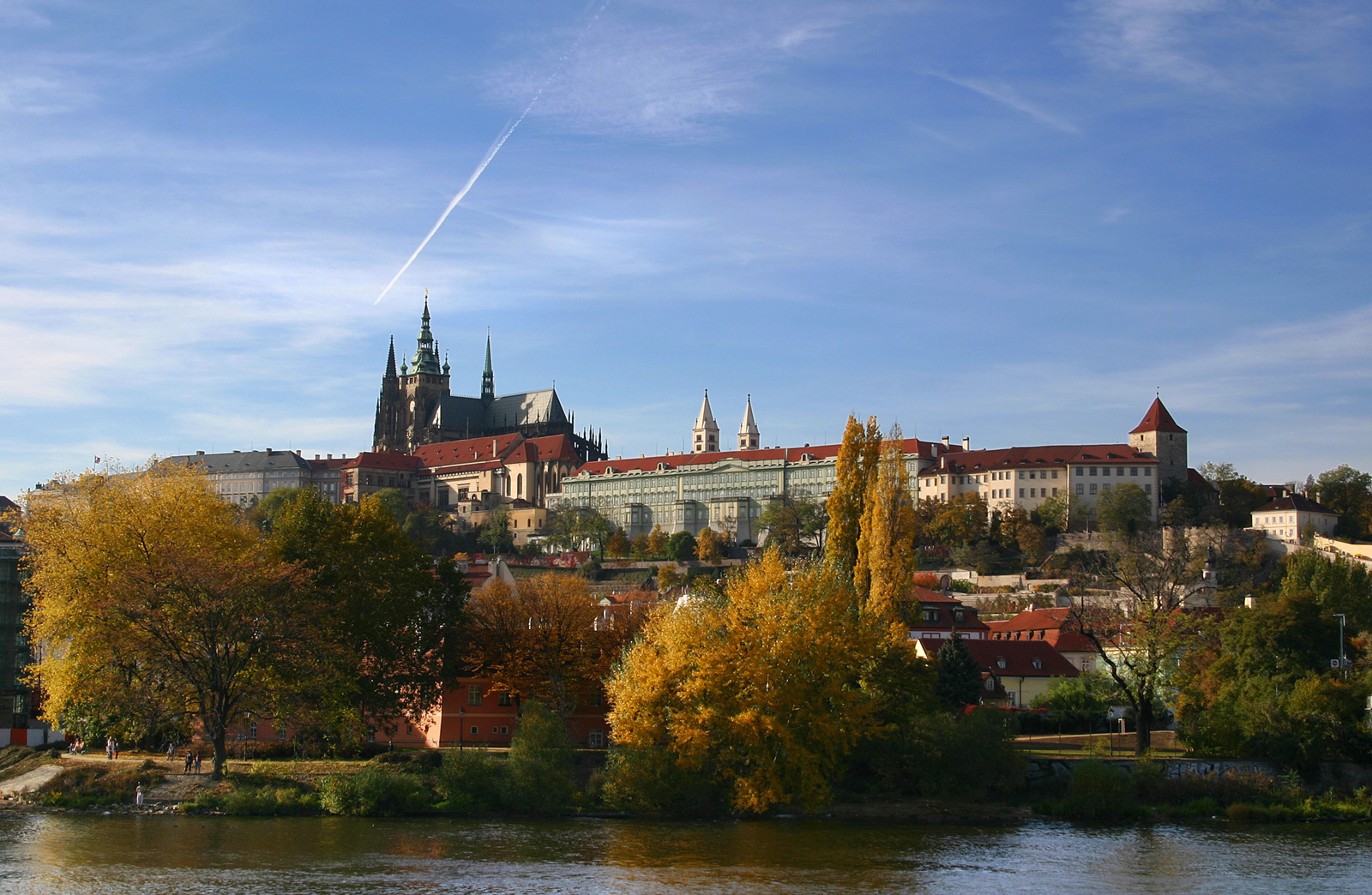
Prague Castle, Czech Republic

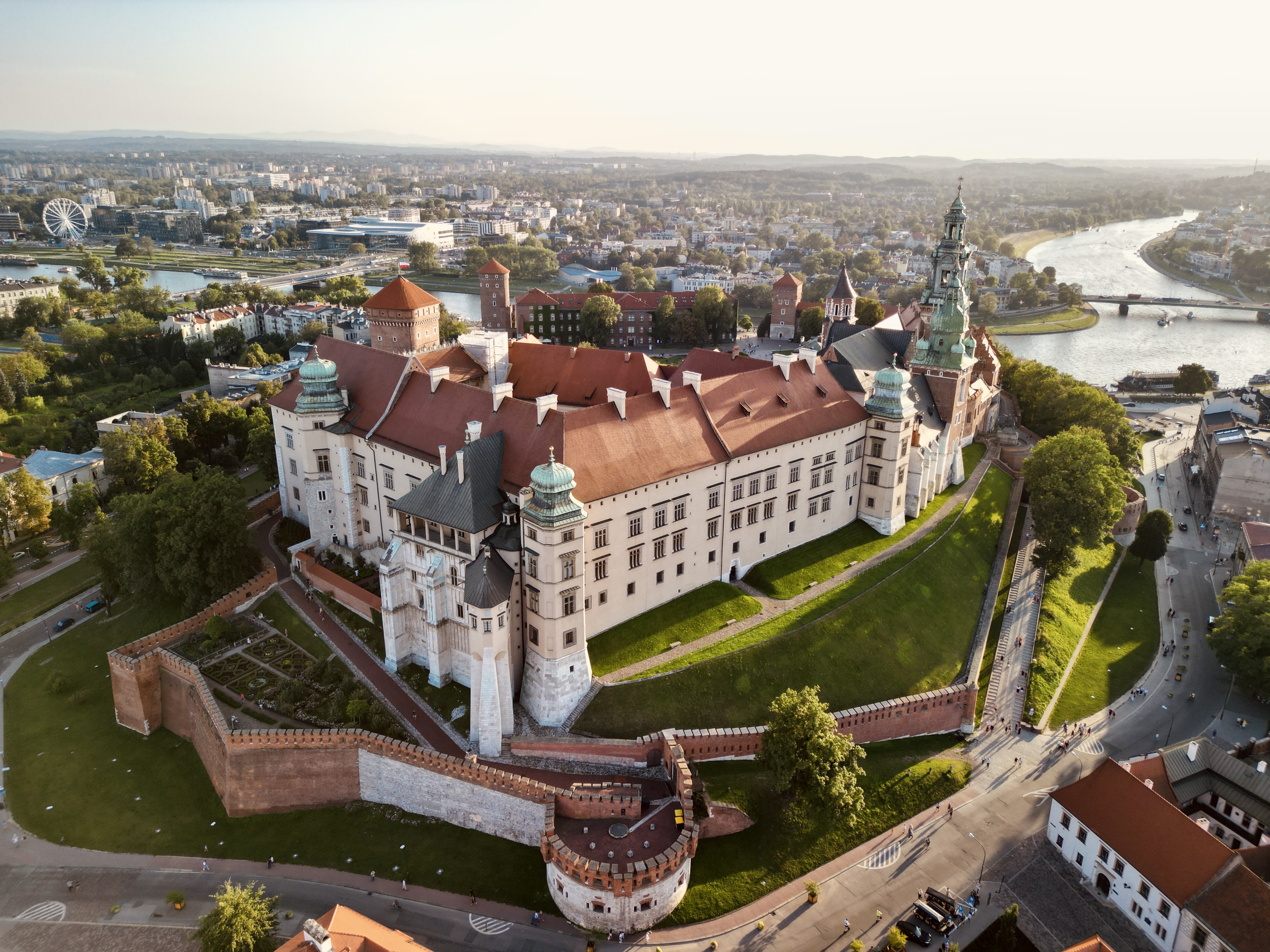
Wawel Castle, Kraków, Poland

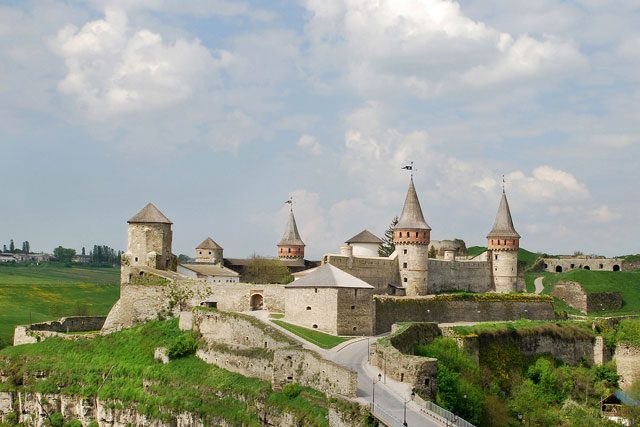
Kamianets-Podilskyi Castle, Ukraine

Charlottenburg Palace, Berlin, Germany

- List of castles in Albania
- List of castles in Armenia
- List of castles in Austria
- List of castles and fortresses in Azerbaijan
- List of castles in Belarus
- List of castles in Belgium
- List of castles in Bosnia and Herzegovina
- List of castles in Bulgaria
- List of castles in Croatia
- List of castles in Cyprus
- List of castles in Czech Republic
- List of castles and palaces in Denmark
- List of castles in Estonia
- List of castles in Finland
- List of castles in France
- List of castles in Germany
- List of castles in Greece
- List of castles in Hungary
- List of castles in the Republic of Ireland
- List of castles in Italy
- List of castles in Latvia
- List of castles in Liechtenstein
- List of castles in Lithuania
- List of castles in Luxembourg
- List of castles in Malta
- List of castles in Moldova
- List of castles in the Netherlands
- List of castles in North Macedonia
- List of castles in Norway
- List of castles in Poland
- List of castles in Portugal
- List of castles in Romania
- List of castles in Russia
- List of castles in Serbia
- List of castles in Slovakia
- List of castles in Slovenia
- List of castles in Spain
- List of castles in Sweden
- List of castles and fortresses in Switzerland
- List of castles in Turkey
- List of castles in Ukraine
- Castles in the United Kingdom
  - List of castles in England
  - List of castles in the Isle of Man
  - List of castles in Northern Ireland
  - List of castles in Scotland
  - List of castles in Wales

== States with limited recognition and dependencies ==
- List of castles in the Channel Islands
- Gibraltar
- List of castles in Kosovo
- List of forts in Artsakh
- List of castles in Northern Cyprus
- List of castles in Transnistria

== See also ==
- Lists of castles around the world
- List of Crusader castles
- List of fortifications
- List of forts
- List of palaces
