= Zberoaia =

- Village
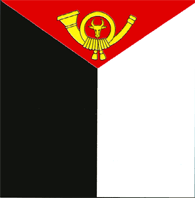
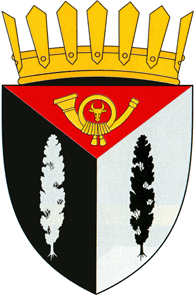
- Flag Coat of arms

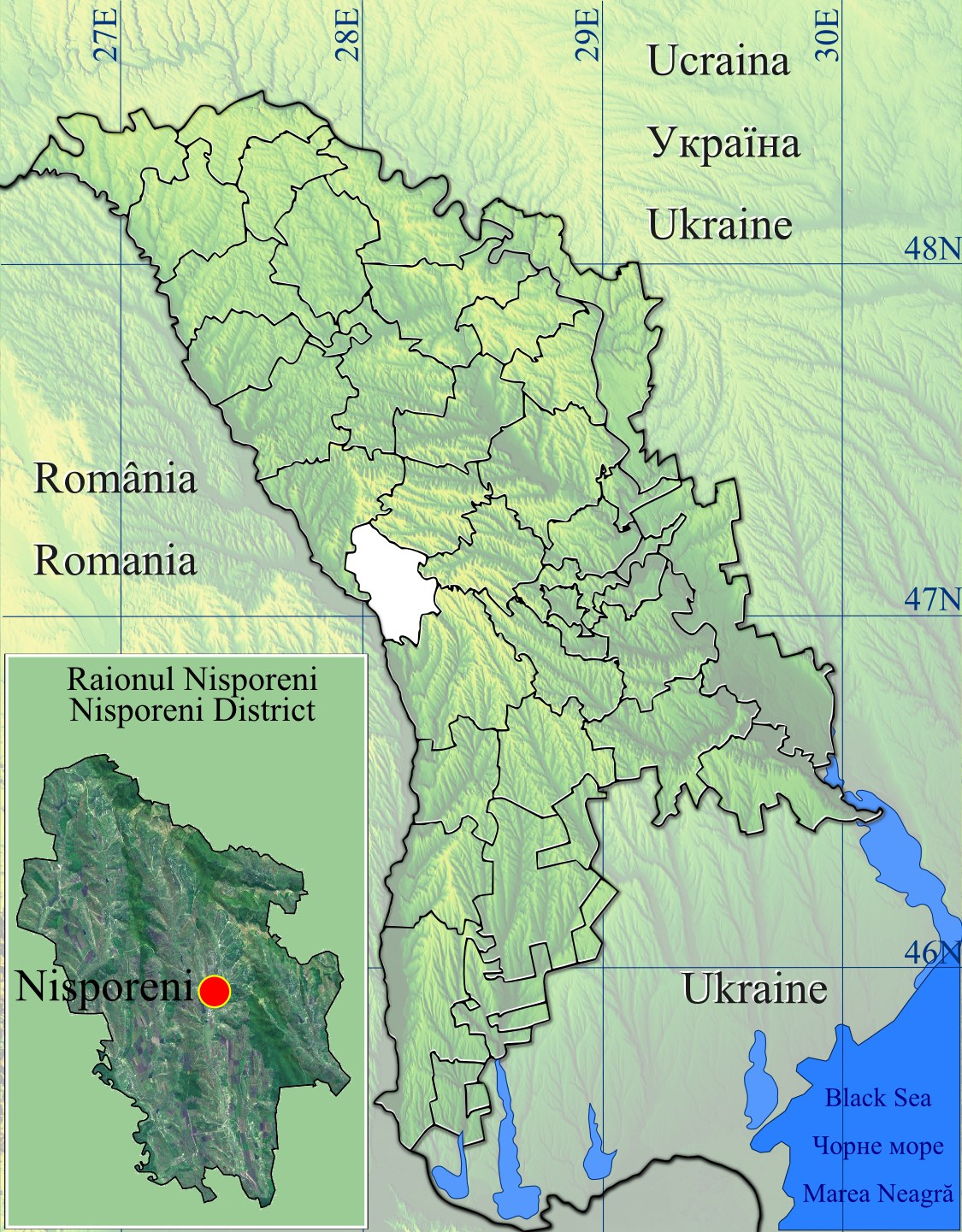
- Location within Nisporeni
- Coordinates: 46°58′7″N 28°6′25″E
- Country: Moldova
- District: Nisporeni District

Government
  - Mayor: Dinu Guțuțui (PLDM)

Population (2014 census)
  - Total: 1,555
- Time zone: UTC+2 (EET)
  - Summer (DST): UTC+3 (EEST)
- Postal code: MD-6441

Zberoaia is a village in Nisporeni District, Moldova.
