= Țigănești, Strășeni =

Țigănești
- Village
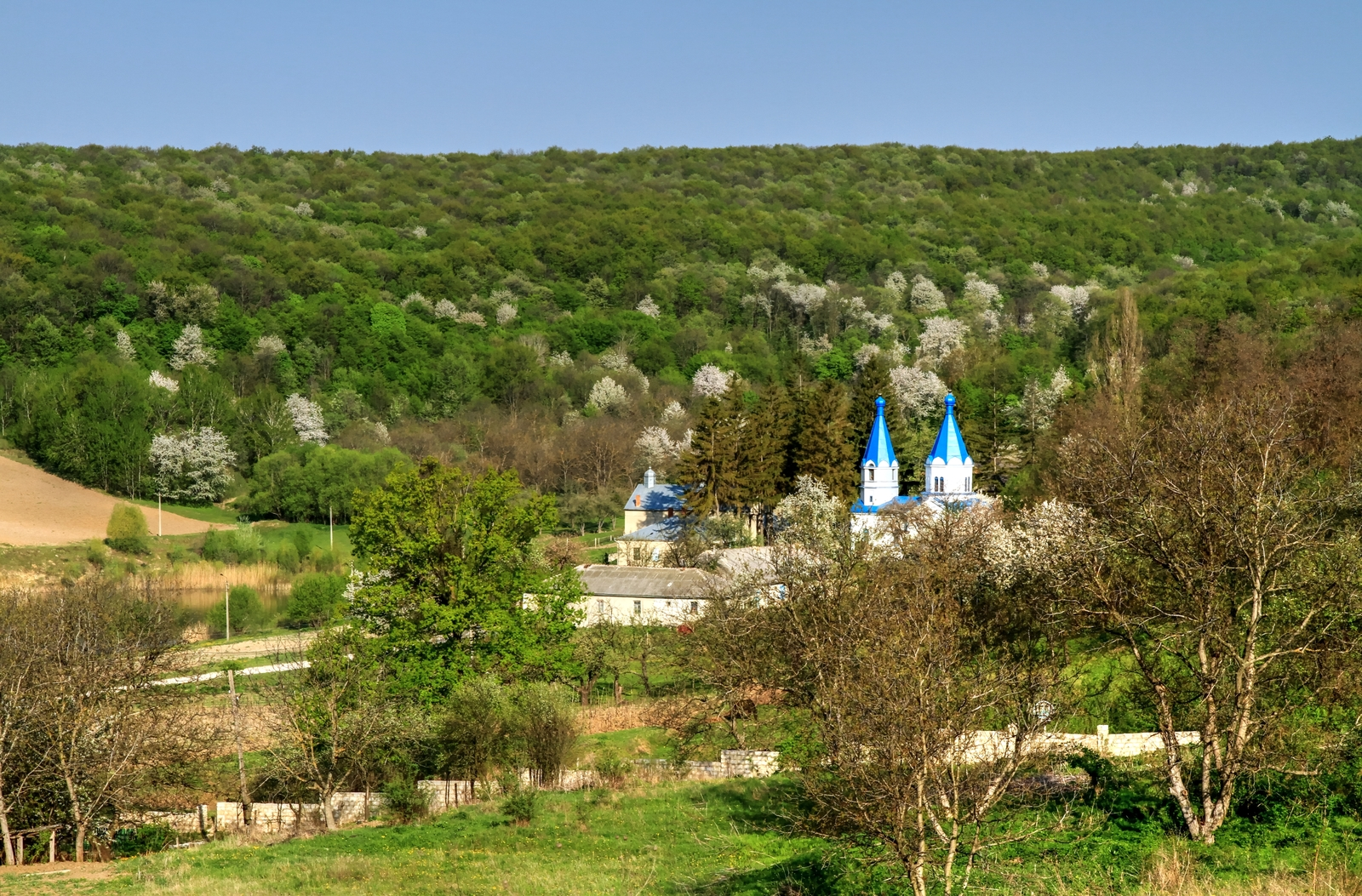

- Location within Moldova
- Coordinates: 47.2969444444°N 28.5538888889°E
- Country: Moldova
- District: Strășeni District

Government
  - Mayor: Valentina Țaca (PDM)

Population (2014 census)
  - Total: 1,148
- Time zone: UTC+2 (EET)
  - Summer (DST): UTC+3 (EEST)

Țigănești is a village in Strășeni District, Moldova.
