= Piatra, Orhei =

- Commune
- Interactive map of Piatra, Orhei
- Country: Moldova
- District: Orhei District

Population (2014)
  - Total: 2,542
- Time zone: UTC+2 (EET)
  - Summer (DST): UTC+3 (EEST)

Piatra is a commune in Orhei District, Moldova. It is composed of two villages, Jeloboc and Piatra.
