= Romănești =

- Village
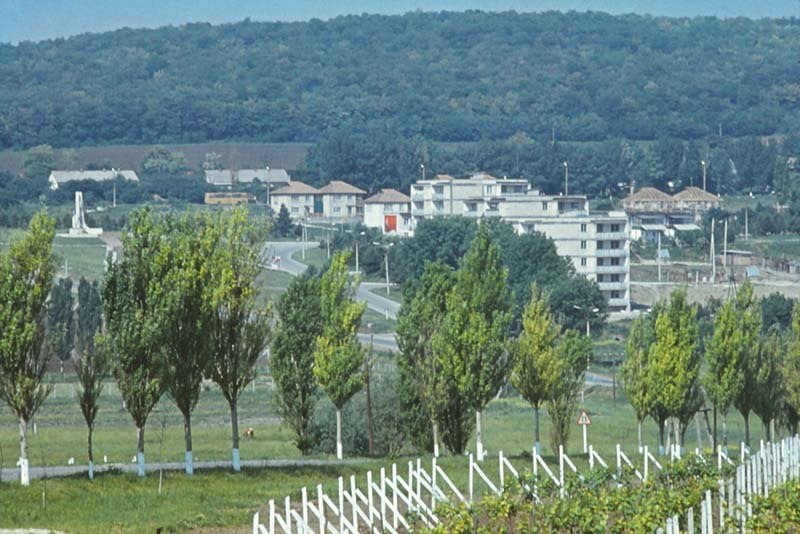

- Location within Moldova
- Coordinates: 47.2236111111°N 28.7136111111°E
- Country: Moldova
- District: Strășeni District

Government
  - Mayor: Isidor Savin (PLDM)

Population (2014 census)
  - Total: 1,248
- Time zone: UTC+2 (EET)
  - Summer (DST): UTC+3 (EEST)

Romănești is a village in Strășeni District, Moldova.
