= Old Orhei =

Moldovan historical and archaeological complex in Trebujeni

Coordinates: 47°19′N 28°58′E

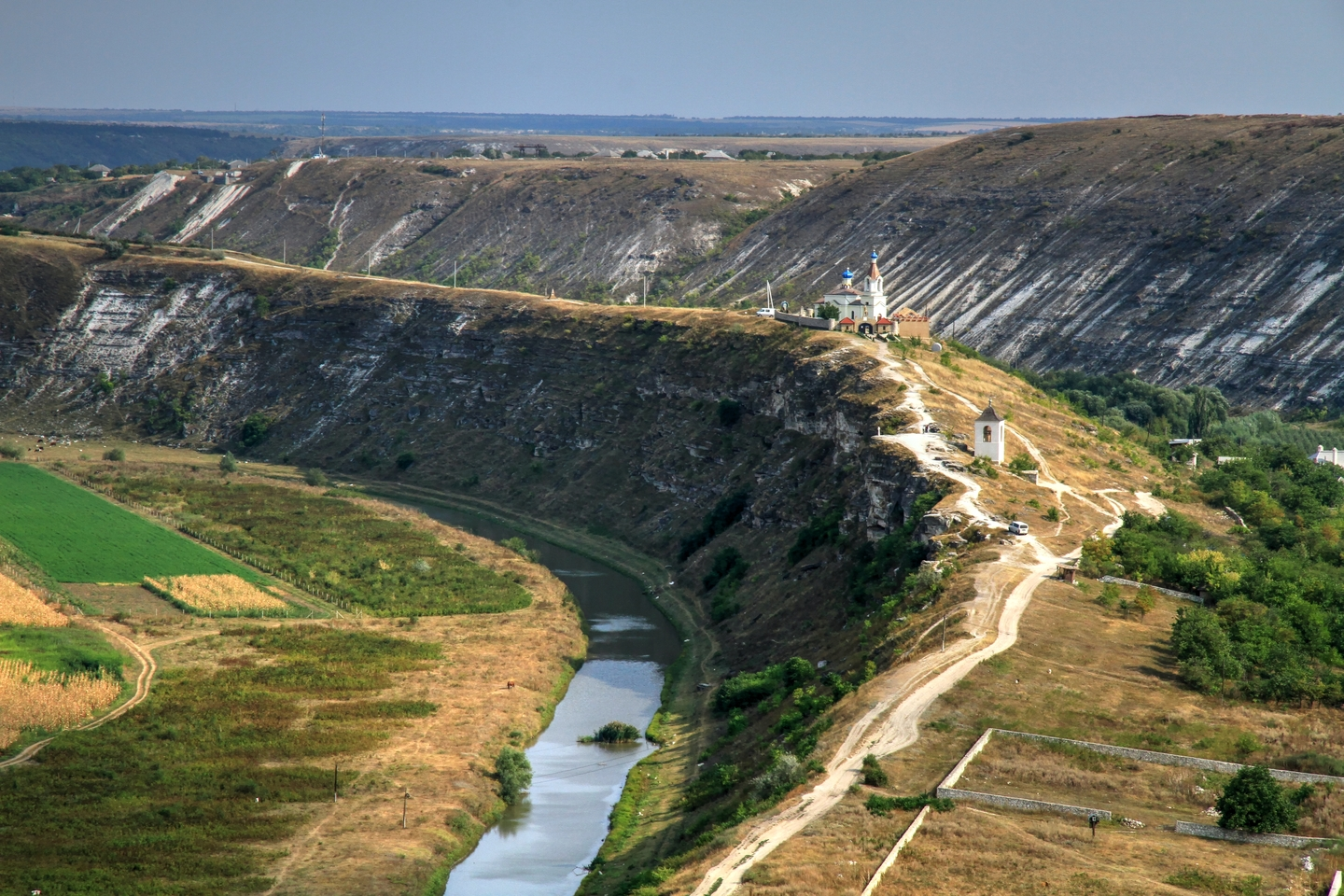
View of Orheiul Vechi

Old Orhei is the core of the Orhei National Park, established in 2013

Old Orhei (Romanian: Orheiul Vechi) is a Moldovan historical and archaeological complex located in Trebujeni, which is approximately 60 kilometres (37 mi) north-east of Chișinău on the Răut River in the Republic of Moldova.

== History ==
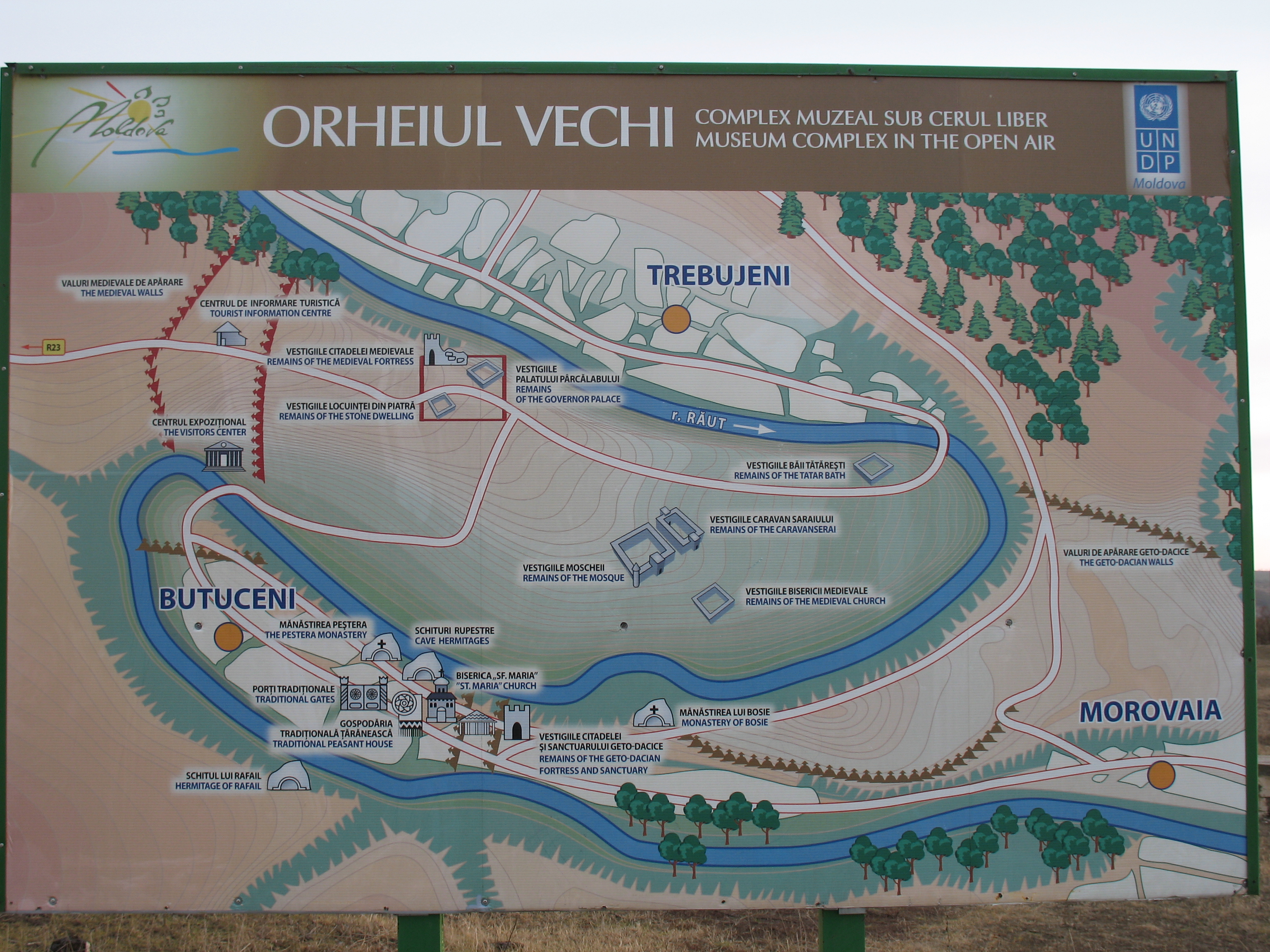
Old Orhei

The ancient city of Orheiul Vechi is a natural and historical complex located on a narrow bend of the Răut River. The natural landscape of limestone rock, eroded by the river, is combined with archaeological vestiges of the ancient Trypillian civilization. As a result of archaeological excavations, cultural layers were discovered from different epochs, such as the Paleolithic, Eneolithic, and Iron Age.

Old Orhei contains traces of different civilizations, including the remnants of earthen and wooden fortresses of a Geto–Dacian fortress (6th–1st centuries BC), the Golden Horde fort Shehr al-Jedid or Yangi-Shehr (14th century), a Moldavian fort (14th-16th century), an Orthodox monastery (c. 14th century), and the Moldavian town of Orhei from the 14th–16th centuries.

The Orthodox monastery is still inhabited by a handful of Orthodox monks who maintain the church at the top of the hill. The caves are still functional as chapels and contain an array of historical artifacts and Old Church Slavonic inscriptions dating from the 1690s, which testify that hajduks took shelter inside them, hiding from the Ottoman authorities.

== See also ==
- Orhei Fort
- Orhei National Park

== Gallery ==
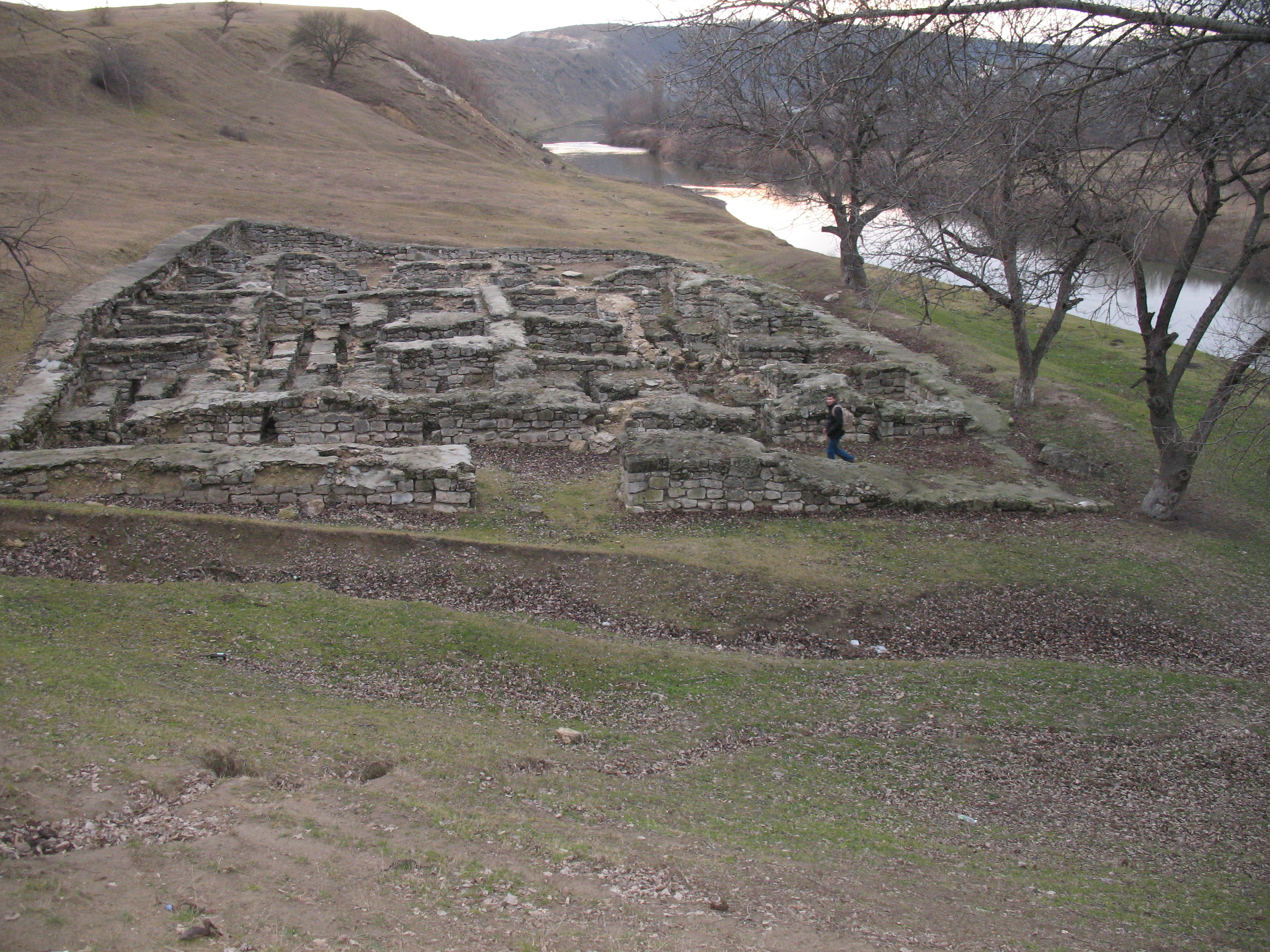

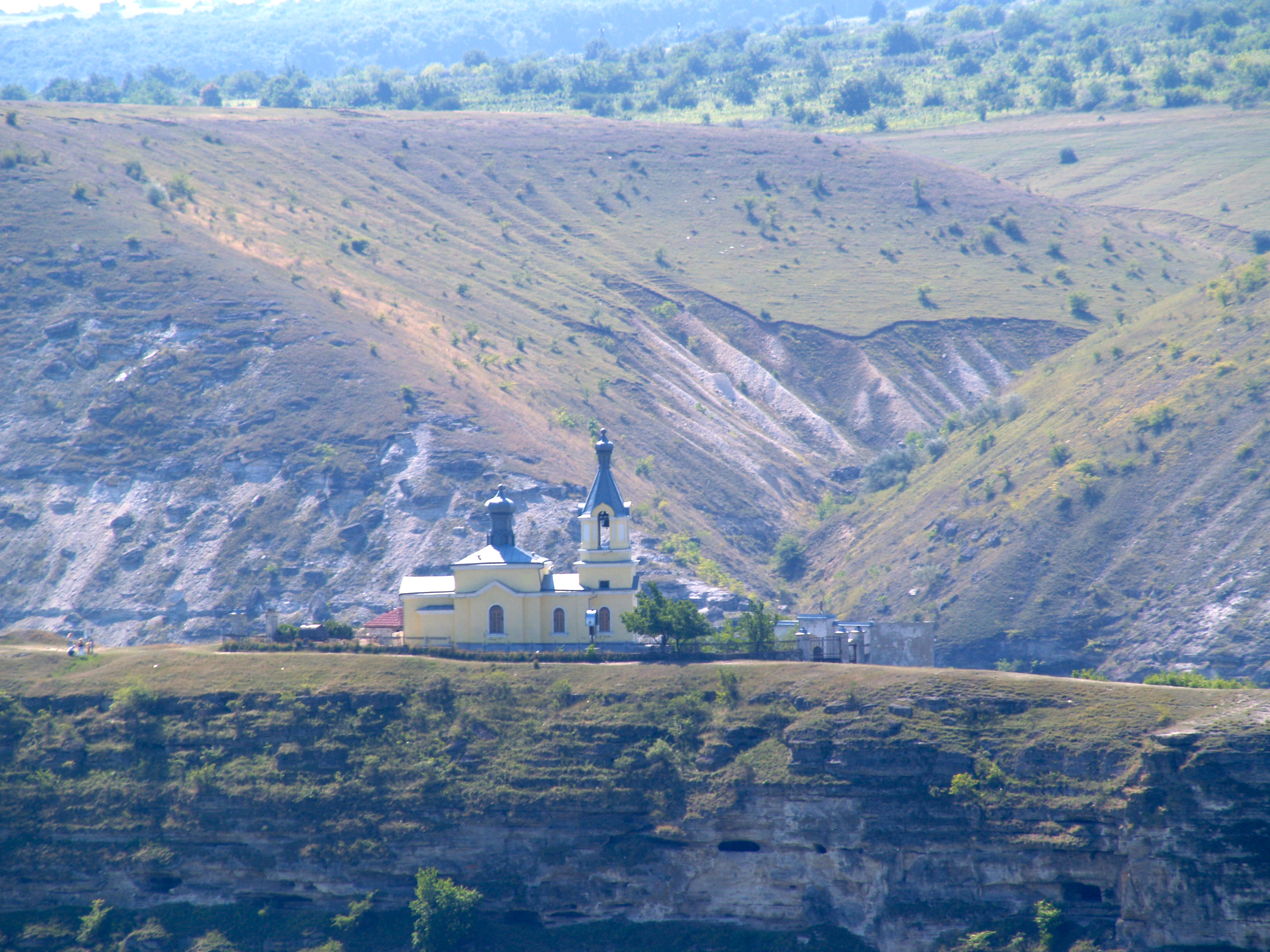

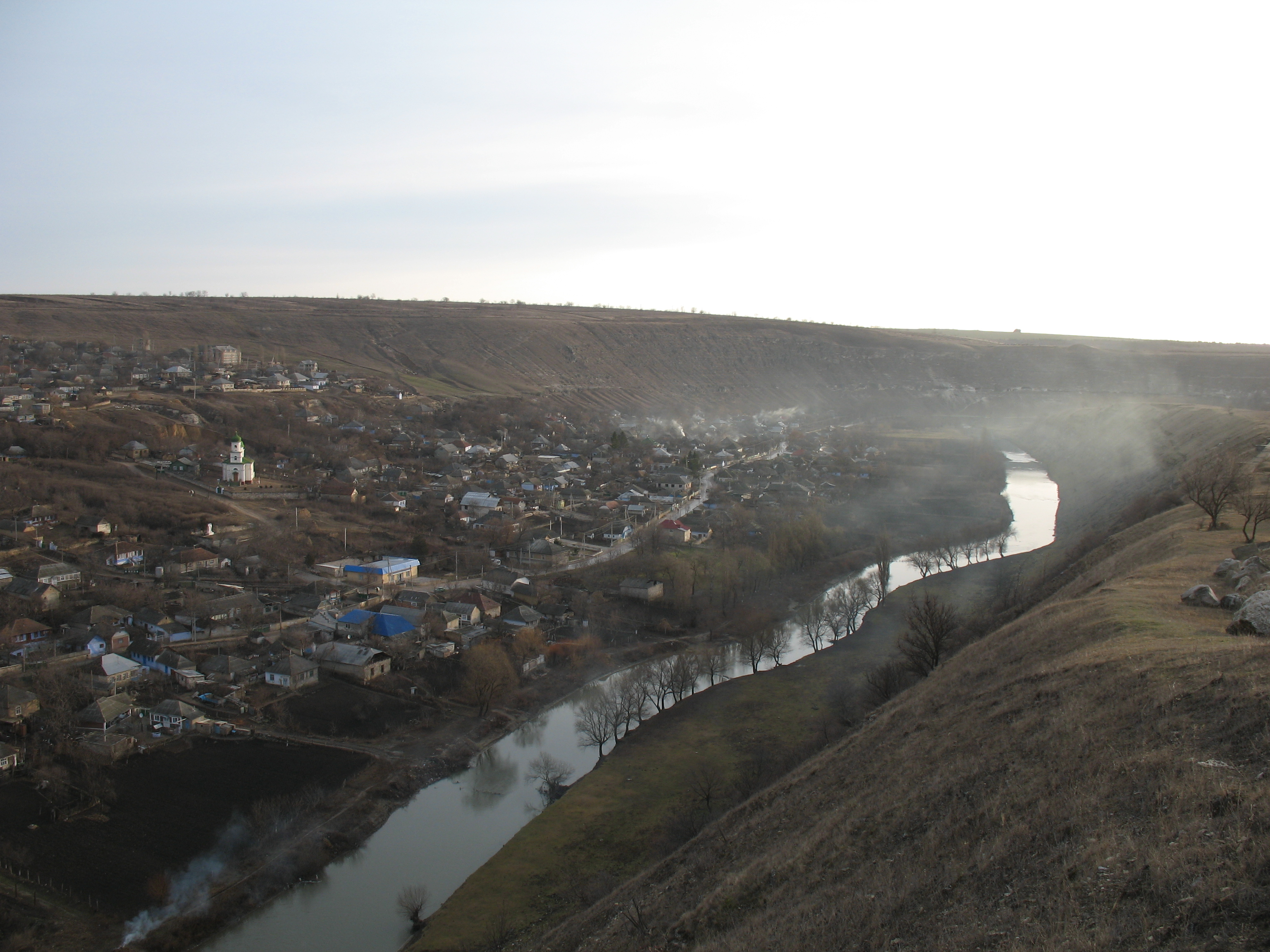

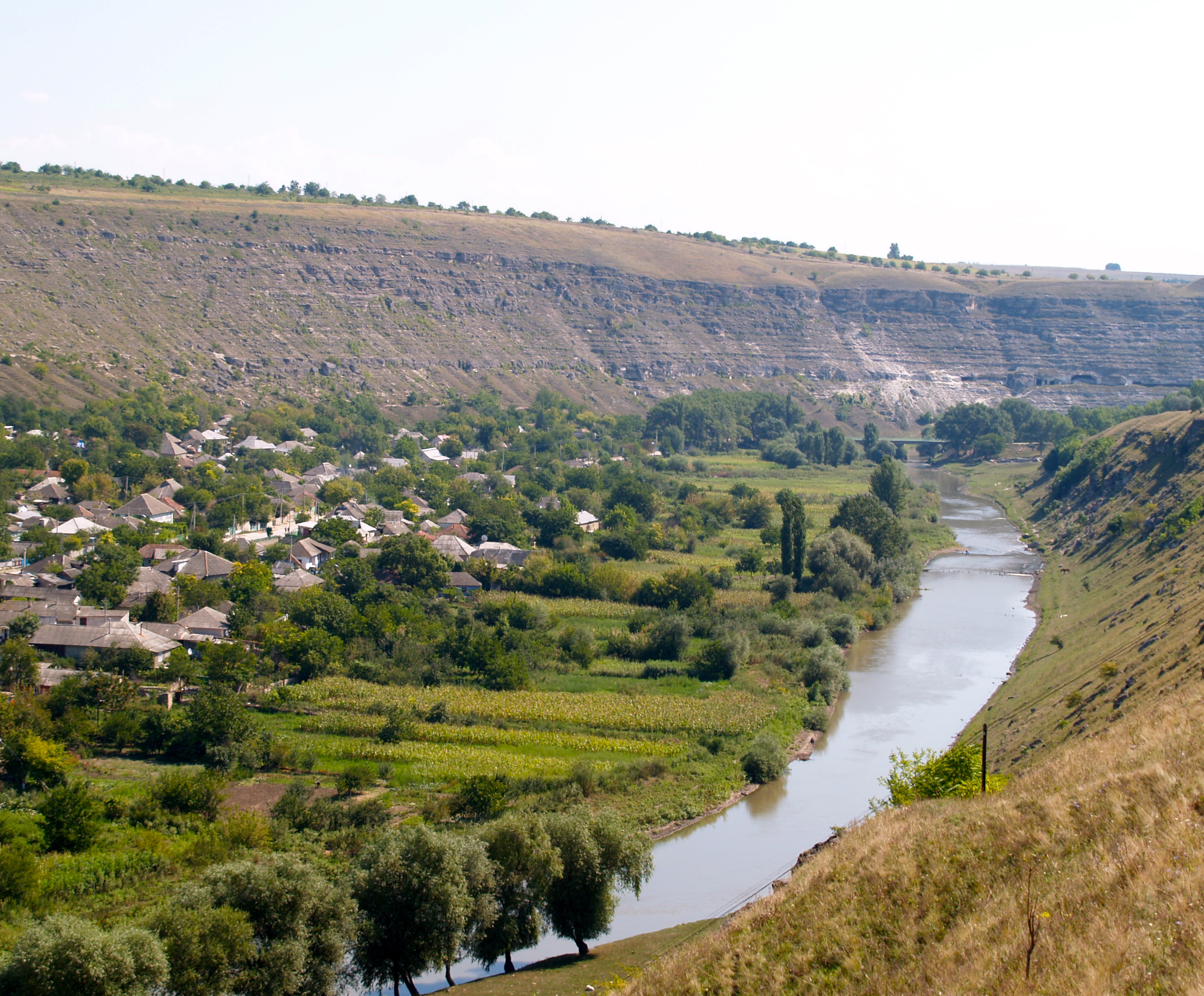

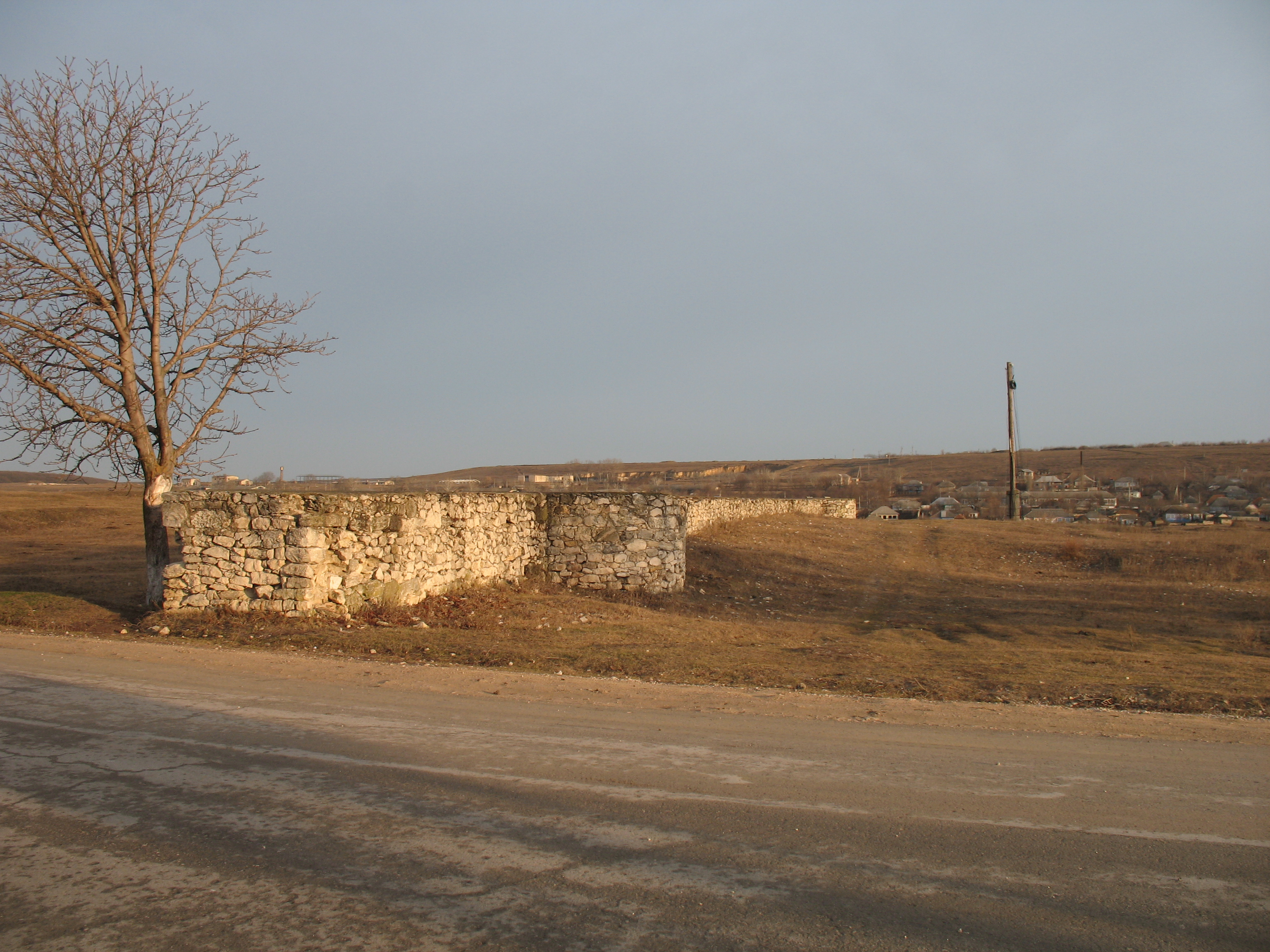
Remains of the governor palace

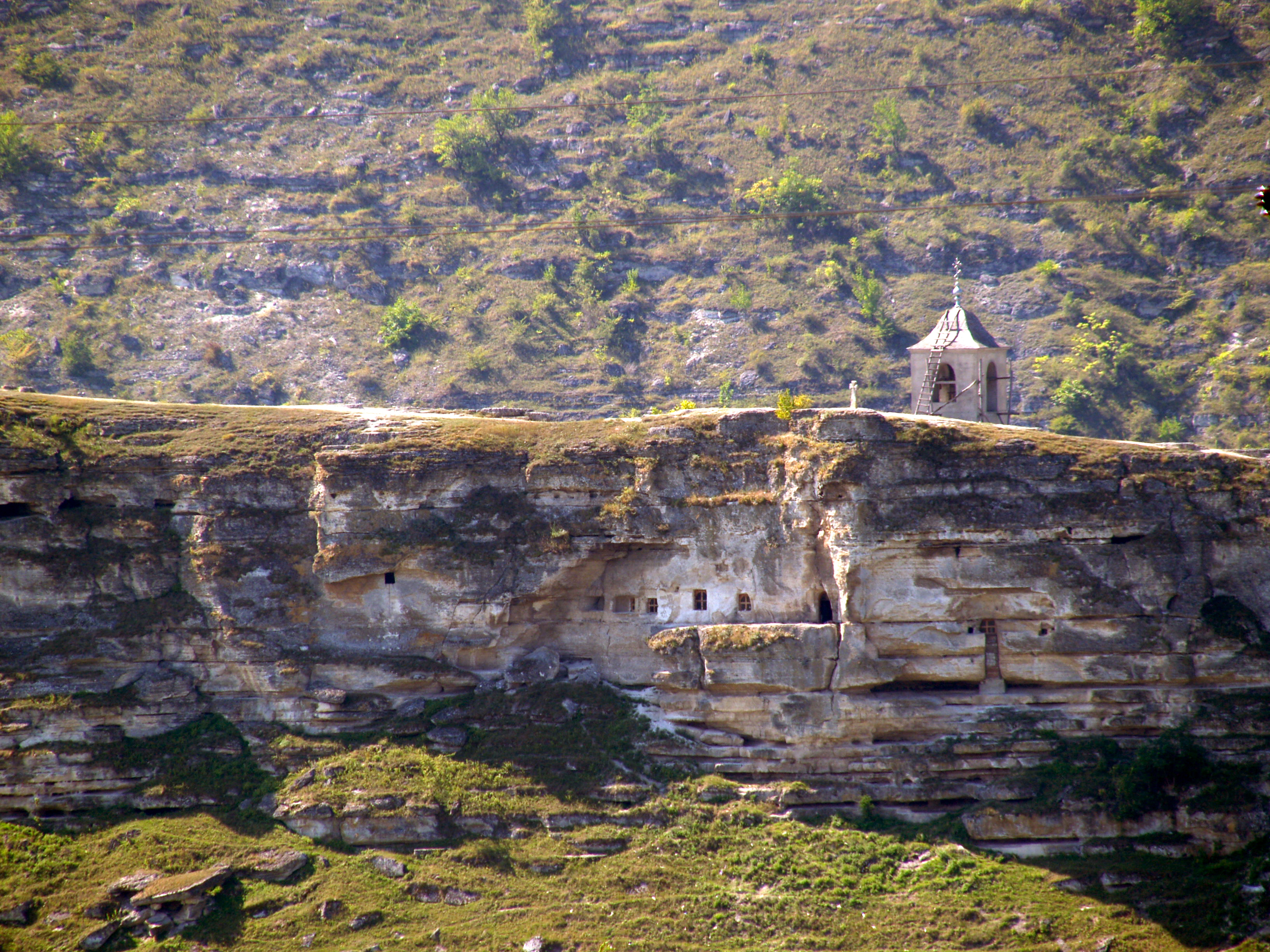

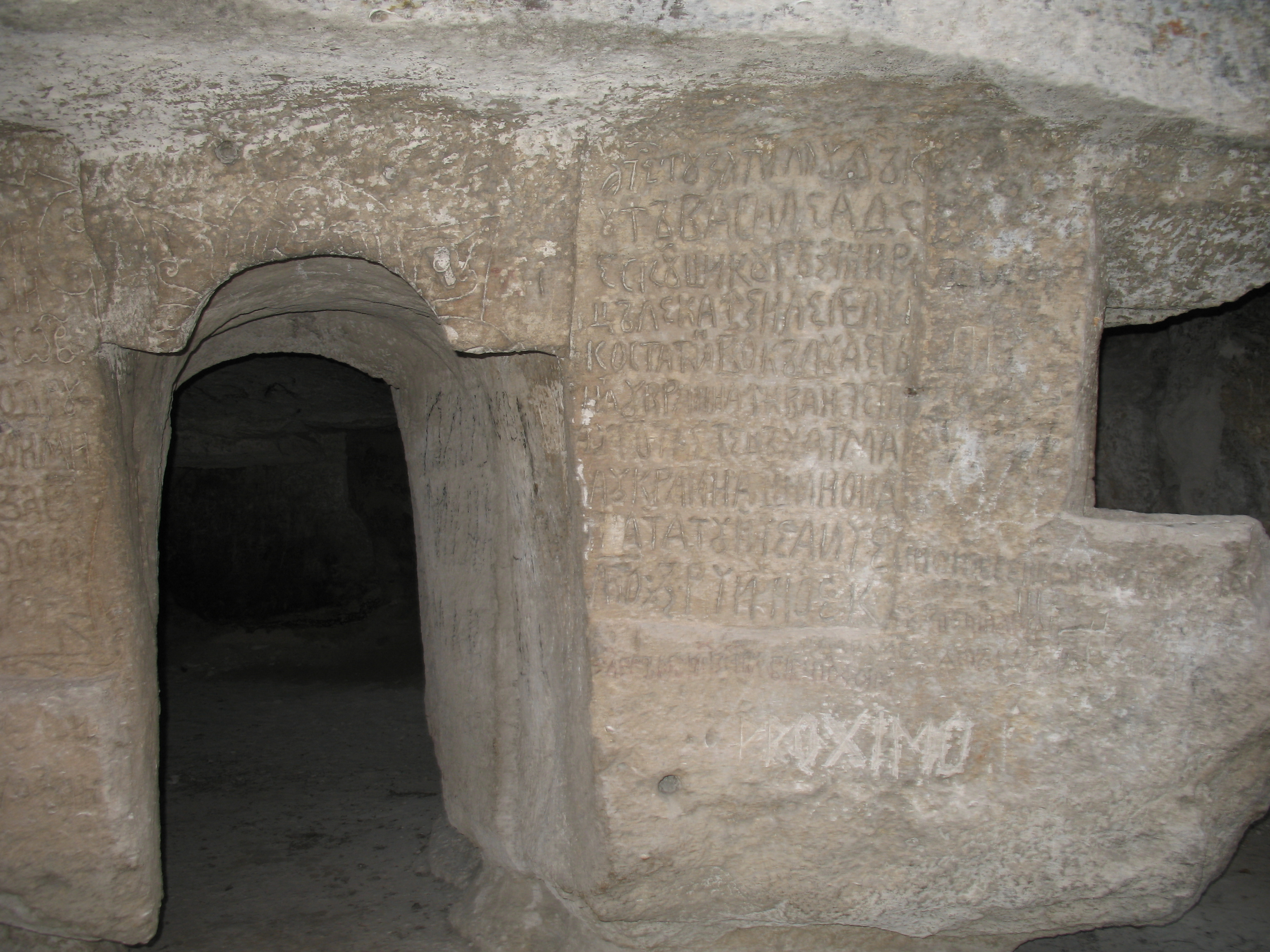

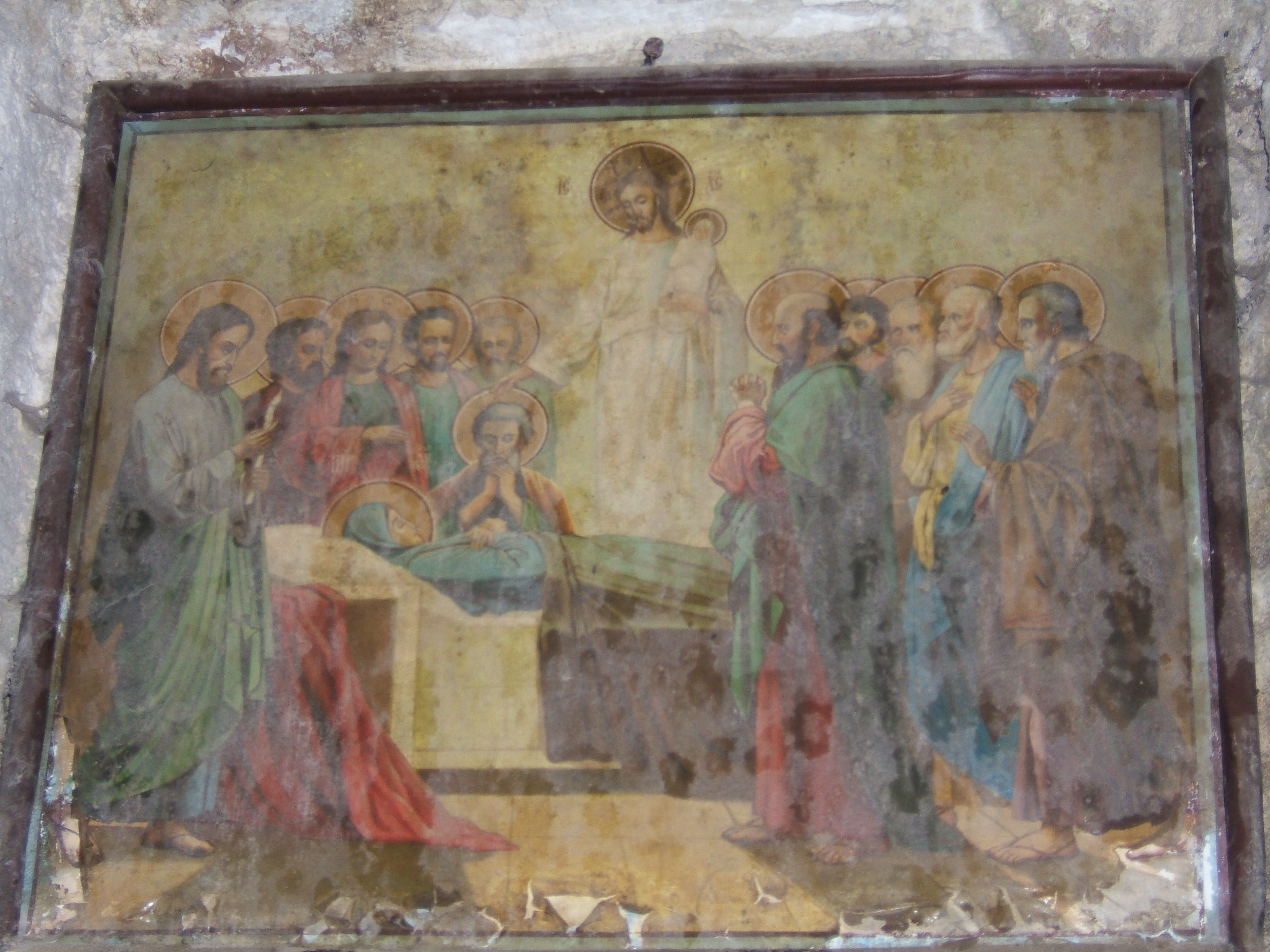

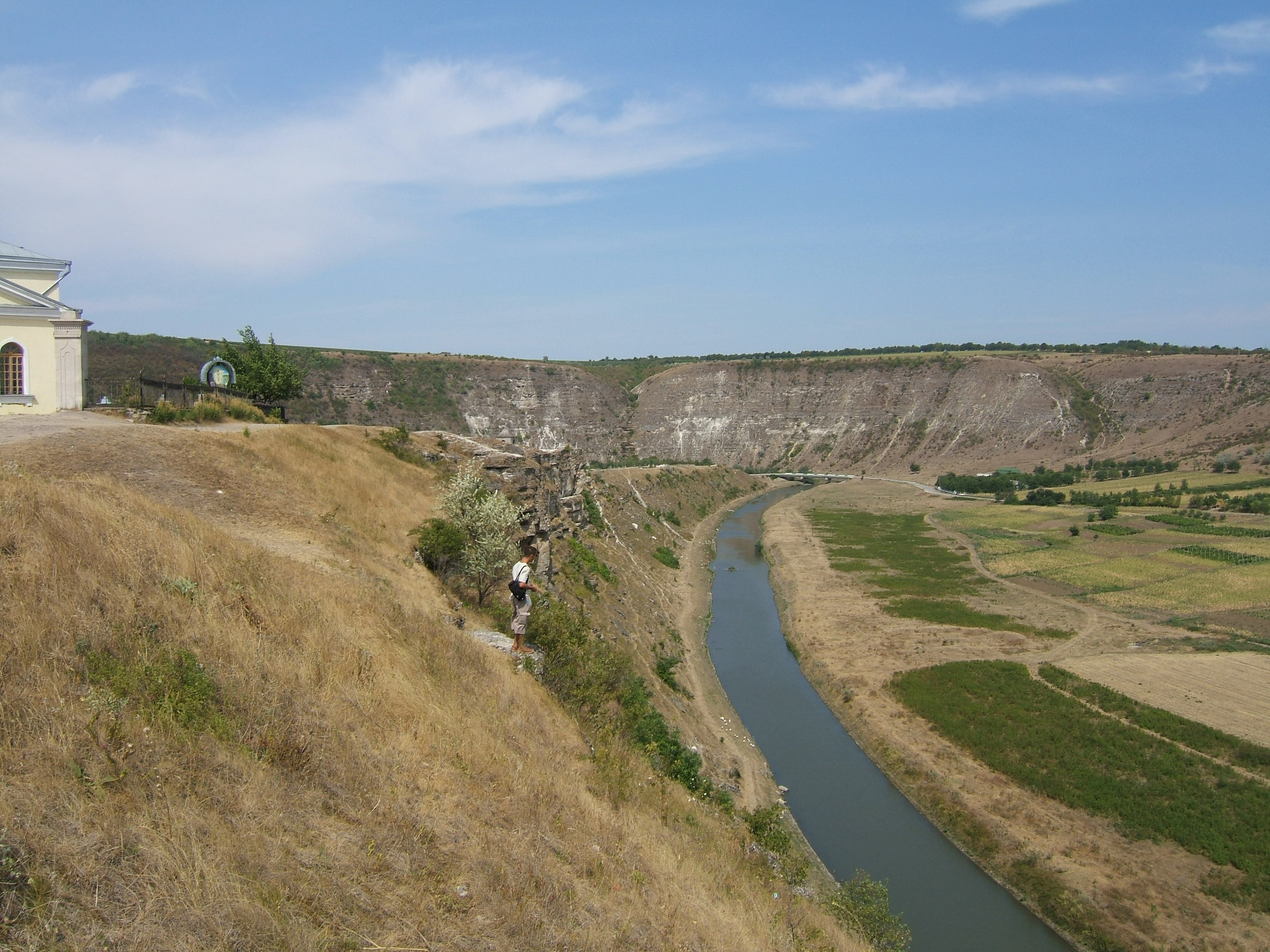

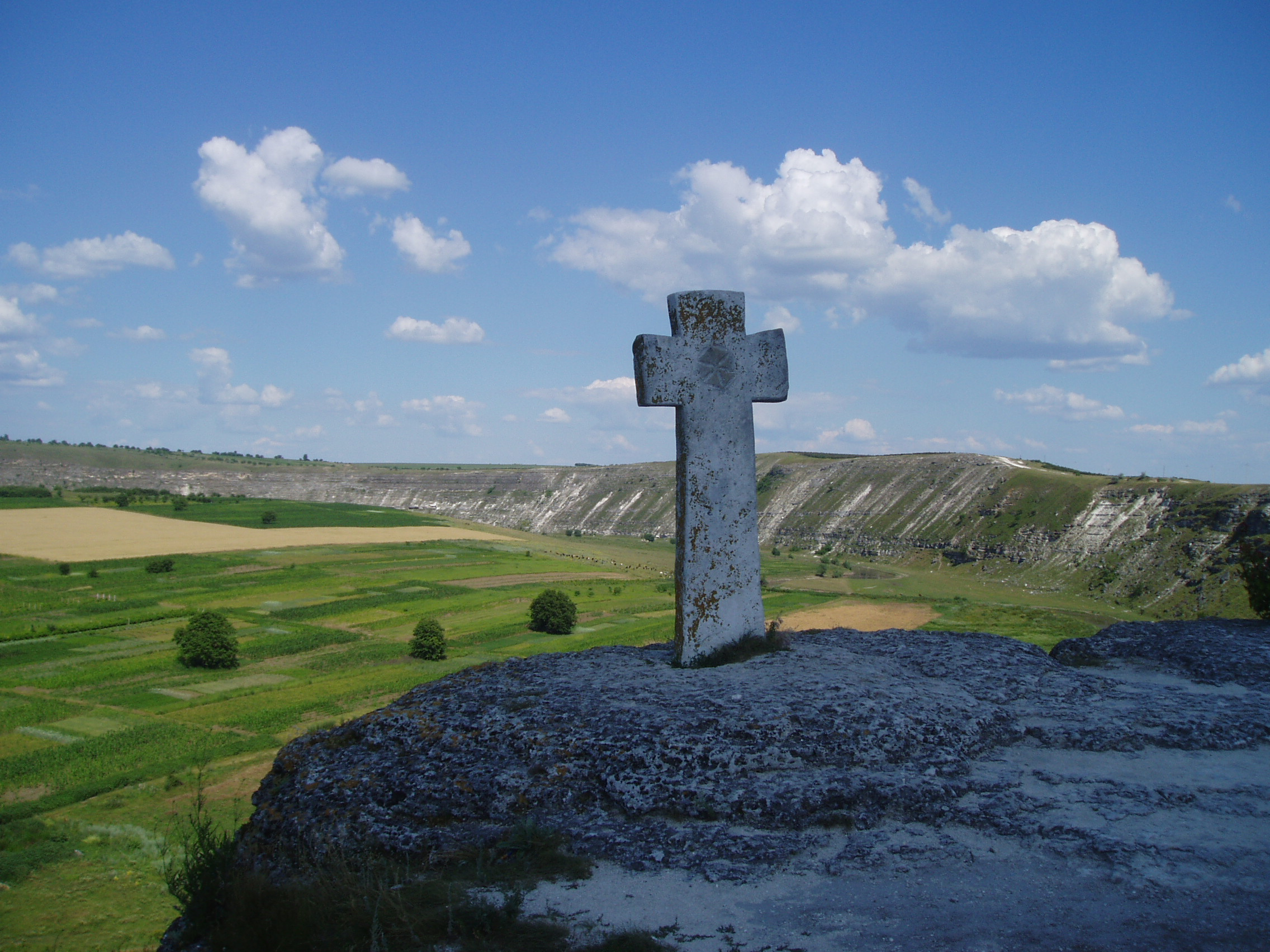

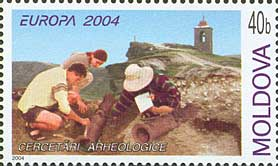
Archaeological research in Old Orhei.
