= Orhei Fort =

- Old Orhei
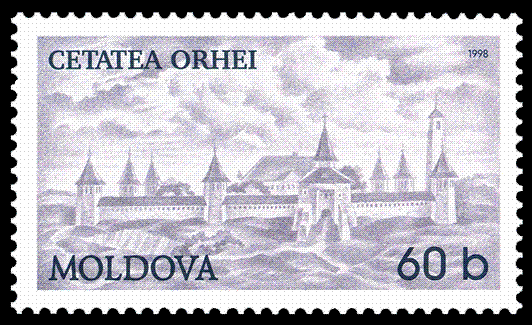

Location
- Coordinates: 47°18′35″N 28°58′24″E

Site history
- Built by: Stephen the Great

Orhei Fort (Romanian: Cetatea Orhei) was a historic fort in the Republic of Moldova, in Old Orhei.

== Gallery ==
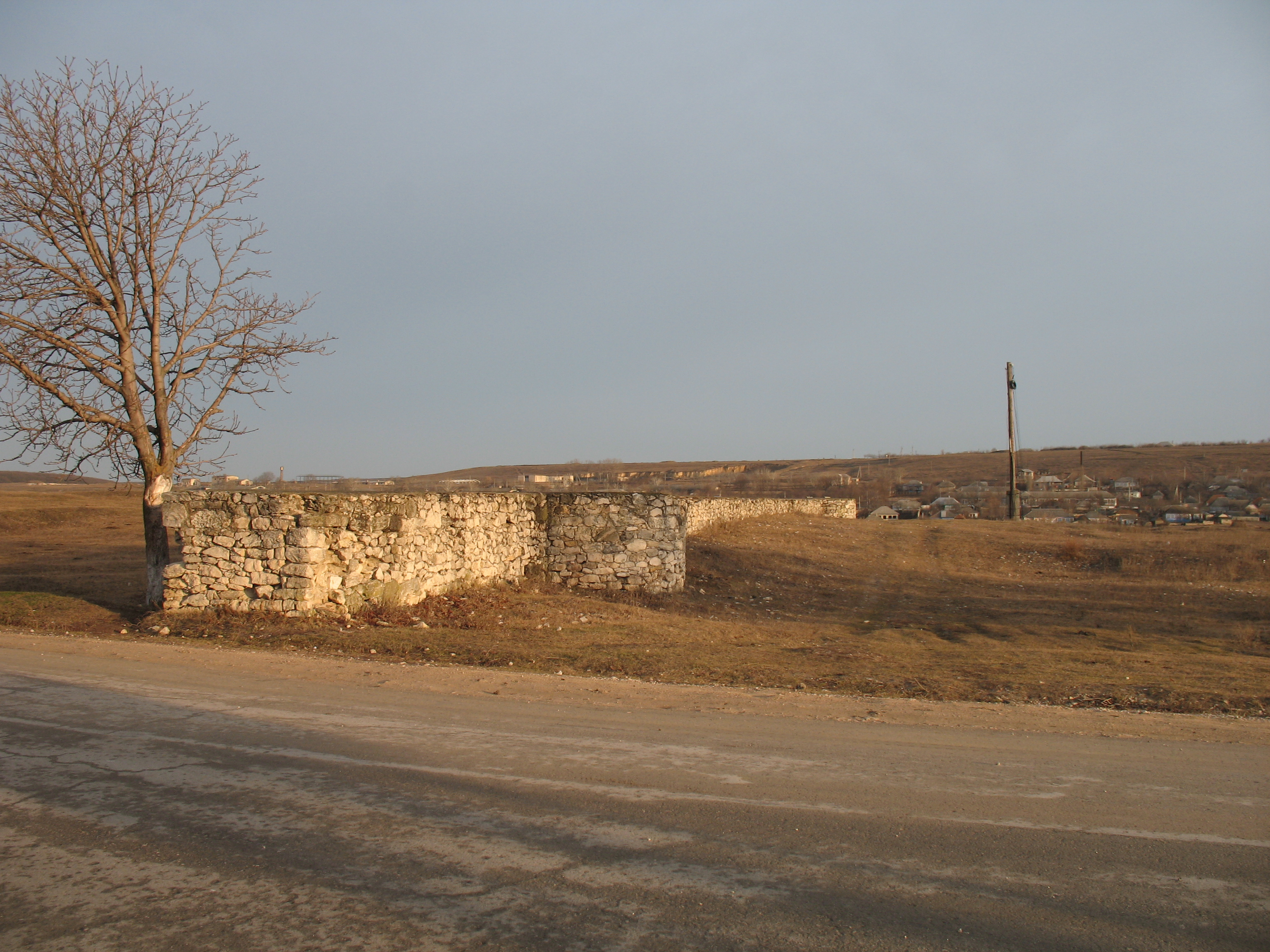
Ruins of the governor's palace, part of the former fortress at Old Orhei

== See also ==
- Old Orhei
