= Șofrîncani =

- Village
- Location within Edineț
- Coordinates: 48°3′11″N 27°23′57″E
- Country: Moldova
- District: Edineț District

Government
  - Mayor: Vladimir Priseajniuc (Independent)
- Elevation: 150 m (490 ft)

Population (2014 census)
  - Total: 1,830
- Time zone: UTC+2 (EET)
  - Summer (DST): UTC+3 (EEST)
- Postal code: MD-4641

Șofrîncani is a village in Edineț District, Moldova.
