= Nicolaevca (disambiguation) =

Nicolaevca may refer to several places in Moldova:

- Nicolaevca, a commune in Florești District
- Nicolaevca, a village in Zolotievca Commune, Anenii Noi district
- Nicolaevca, a village in Găvănoasa Commune, Cahul district
- Nicolaevca, a village in Scumpia Commune, Făleşti district
- Nicolaevca, a village in Cuhureştii de Sus Commune, Florești District
- Nicolaevca, a village in Danu Commune, Glodeni district
- Nicolaevca, a village in Hănăsenii Noi Commune, Leova district
- Nicolaevca, a village in Chişcăreni Commune, Sîngerei district
