= Țânțăreni =

Ţânţăreni or Ţînţăreni may refer to several places in Romania:

- Țânțăreni, Gorj, a commune in Gorj County
- Ţânţăreni, a village in Blejoi Commune, Prahova County

and in Moldova:

- Ţînţăreni, Anenii Noi, a commune in Anenii Noi district
- Ţînţăreni, Teleneşti, a commune in Teleneşti district
