= Mereni =

Mereni may refer to several places:

In Romania

- Mereni, Constanța, a commune in Constanța County
- Mereni, Covasna, a commune in Covasna County
- Mereni, Teleorman, a commune in Teleorman County
- Mereni, a village in Conțești Commune, Dâmbovița County
- Mereni, a village in Bărăști Commune, Olt County
- Mereni, a district in the town of Salcea, Suceava County
- Mereni, a district in the town of Titu, Dâmbovița County

In Moldova

- Mereni, Anenii Noi, a commune in Anenii Noi district
- Merenii Noi, a commune in Anenii Noi district
- Mereni, a village in Albina commune, Cimișlia district
