= Chirca =

- Commune
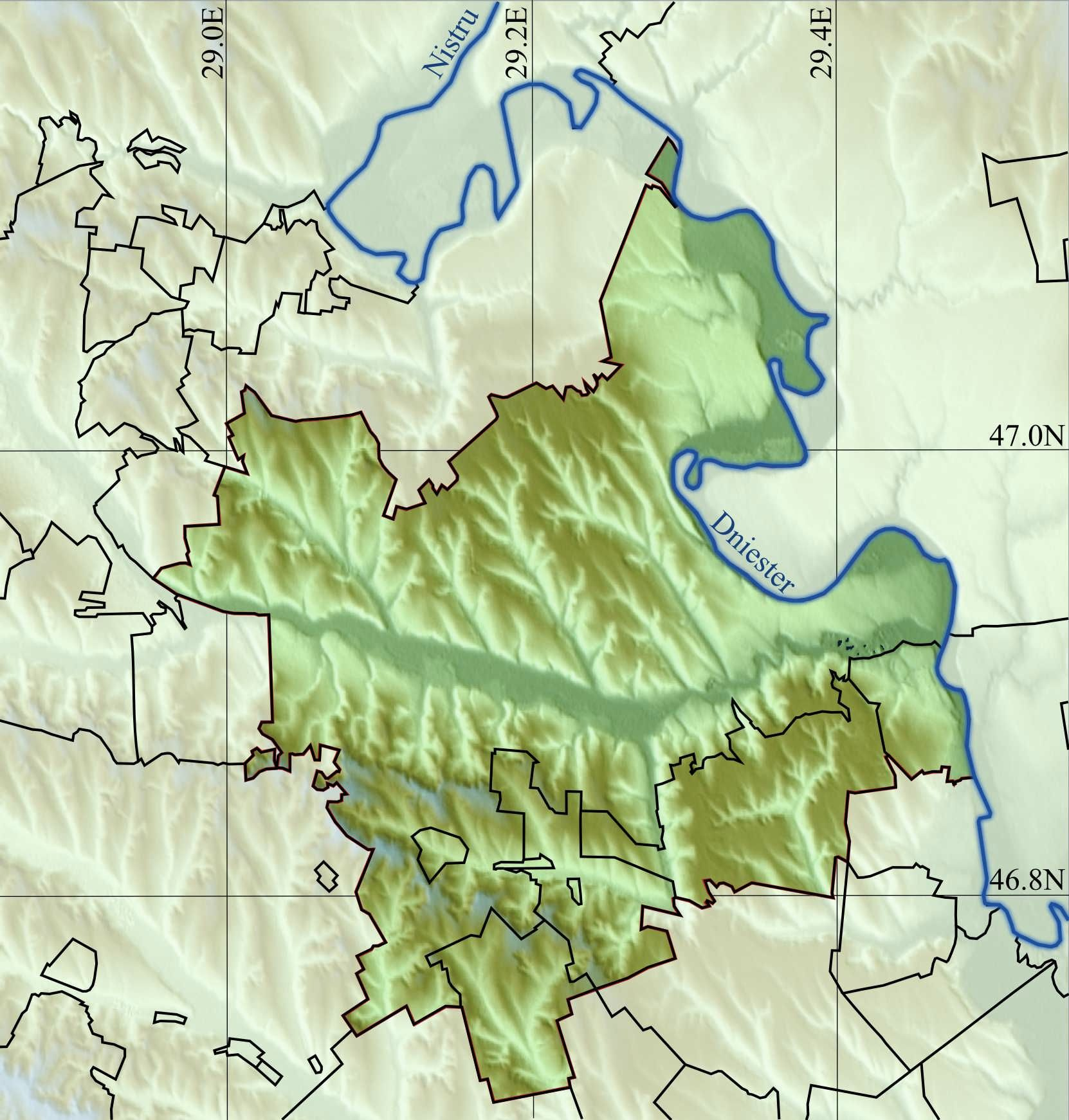
- Location within Anenii Noi District Location within Moldova
- Coordinates: 46°55′N 29°07′E
- Country: Moldova
- District: Anenii Noi District

Population (2014)
  - Total: 1,826
- Time zone: UTC+2 (EET)
  - Summer (DST): UTC+3 (EEST)

Chirca is a commune in the Anenii Noi District of the Republic of Moldova. It is composed of two villages, Botnăreștii Noi and Chirca.
