= Geamăna, Anenii Noi =

Geamăna
- Commune
- Interactive map of Geamăna
- Coordinates: 46.8183326721191400°N 29.1388893127441400°E
- Country: Moldova
- District: Anenii Noi District

Population (2014)
  - Total: 3,062
- Time zone: UTC+2 (EET)
  - Summer (DST): UTC+3 (EEST)

Geamăna is a commune in the Anenii Noi District of Moldova. It is composed of two villages, Geamăna and Batîc.
