= Puhăceni =

- Commune and village
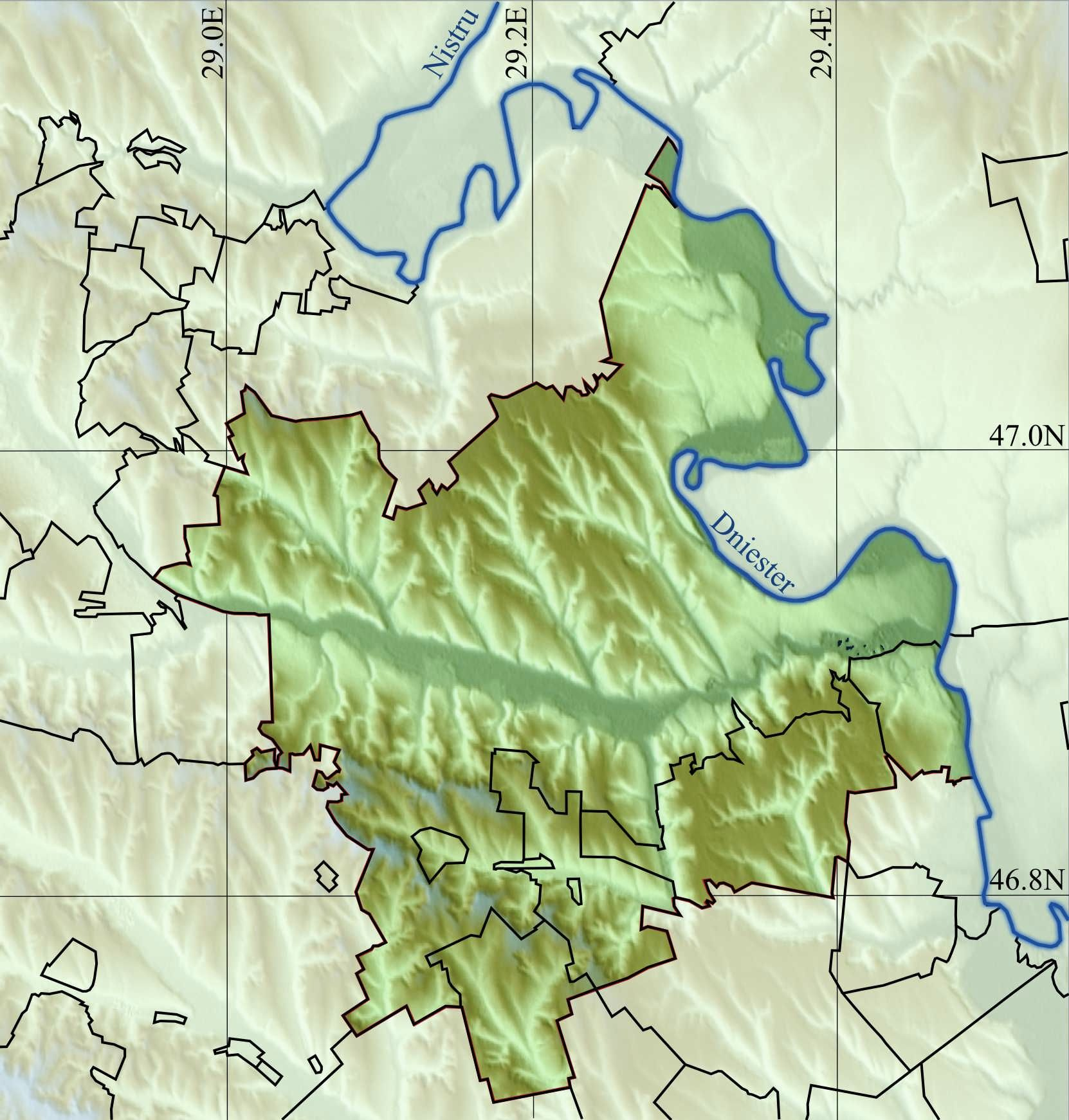
- Location within Anenii Noi District Location within Moldova
- Coordinates: 47°01′N 29°21′E

Population
  - Total: 3,401
- Time zone: UTC+2 (EET)
  - Summer (DST): UTC+3 (EEST)
- Postal code: 6529

Puhăceni is a commune and village in the Anenii Noi district of Moldova.
