= Gura Bîcului =

- Commune and village
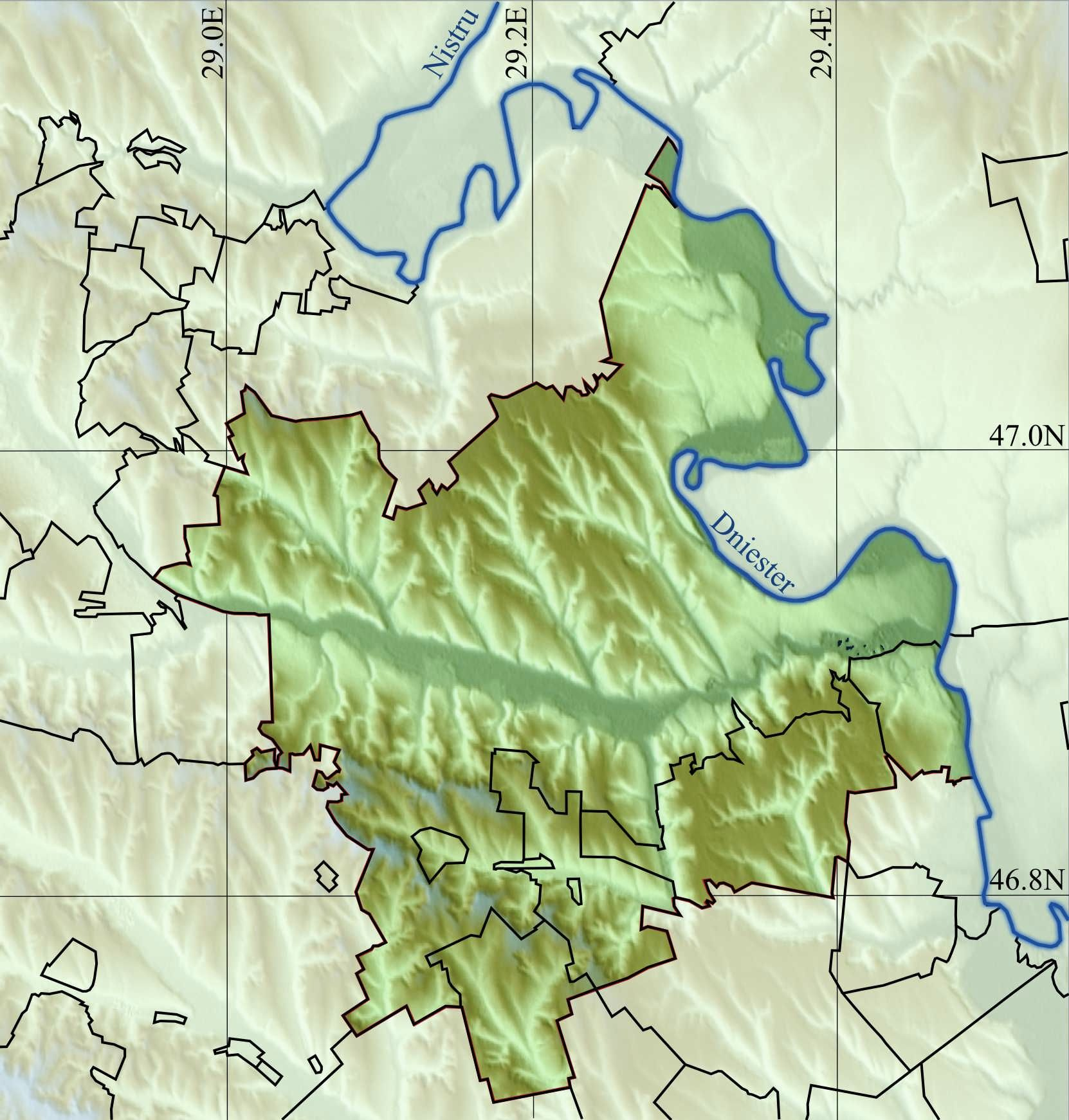
- Location within Anenii Noi District Location within Moldova
- Coordinates: 46°56′N 29°28′E
- Country: Moldova
- District: Anenii Noi District

Population (2014 census)
  - Total: 3,401
- Time zone: UTC+2 (EET)
  - Summer (DST): UTC+3 (EEST)

Gura Bîcului is a commune and village in the Anenii Noi District of the Republic of Moldova. The Gura Bîcului bridge on the Dniester river was blown up on 5 May 1992 during the Transnistria War. It was later rebuilt by the Organization for Security and Co-operation in Europe, using European Union funds, as part of the so-called Berlin Plus package. The Gura Bîcului bridge was officially opened to the traffic on 18 November 2017.
