= Ciobanovca =

- Commune
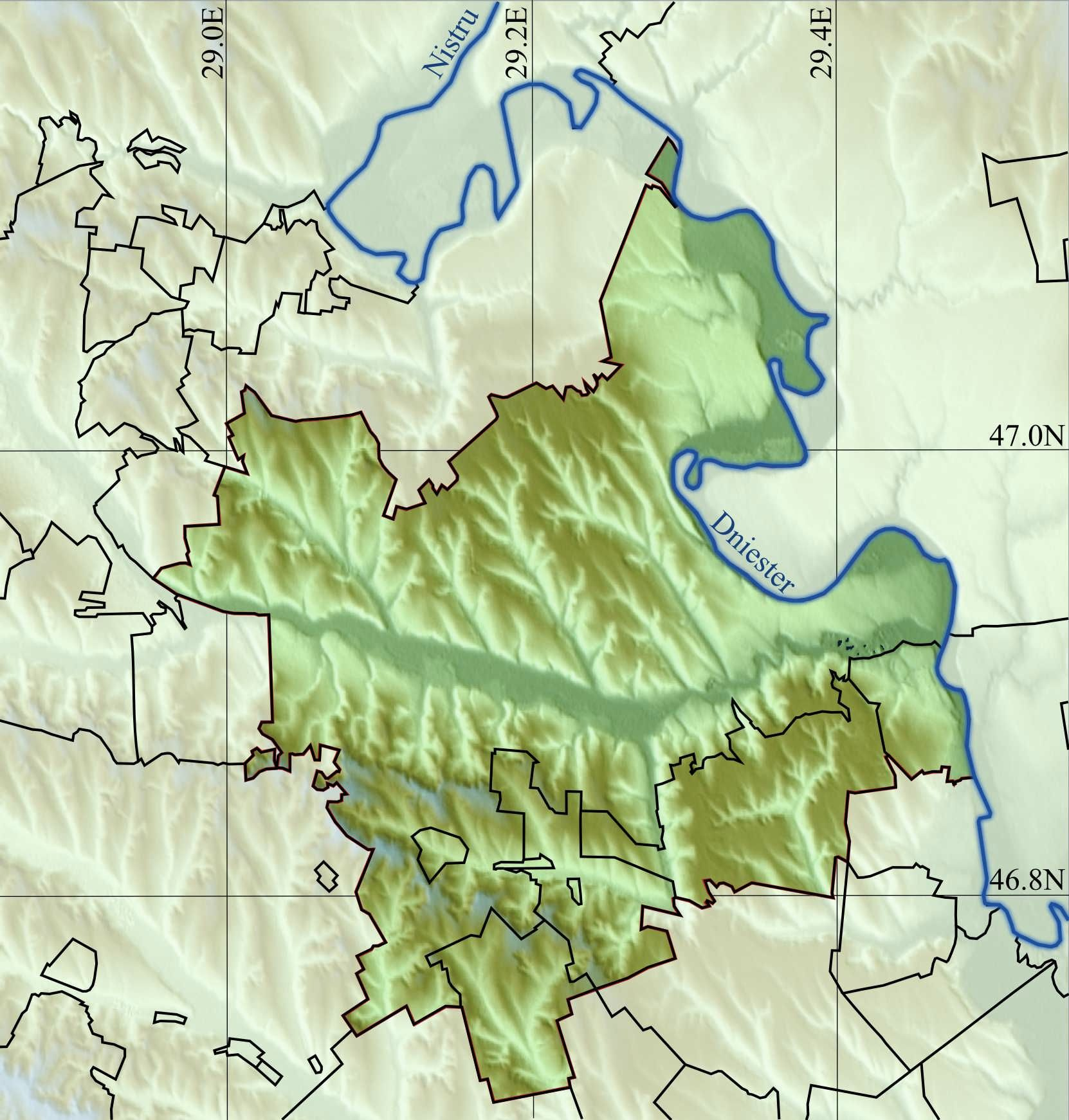
- Location within Anenii Noi District Location within Moldova
- Coordinates: 46°48′52″N 29°11′24″E
- Country: Moldova
- District: Anenii Noi District

Population (2014)
  - Total: 1,718
- Time zone: UTC+2 (EET)
  - Summer (DST): UTC+3 (EEST)

Ciobanovca is a commune in the Anenii Noi District of the Republic of Moldova. It is composed of four villages: Balmaz, Ciobanovca, Mirnoe and Troița Nouă. Founded by German settlers in 1887 as "Hirtenheim".
