= Roșcani, Anenii Noi =

- Commune and village
- Interactive map of Roșcani, Anenii Noi
- Country: Moldova
- District: Anenii Noi District

Population (2014 census)
  - Total: 2,591
- Time zone: UTC+2 (EET)
  - Summer (DST): UTC+3 (EEST)

Roșcani is a village in the Anenii Noi District of Moldova.
