= Calfa =

- Commune
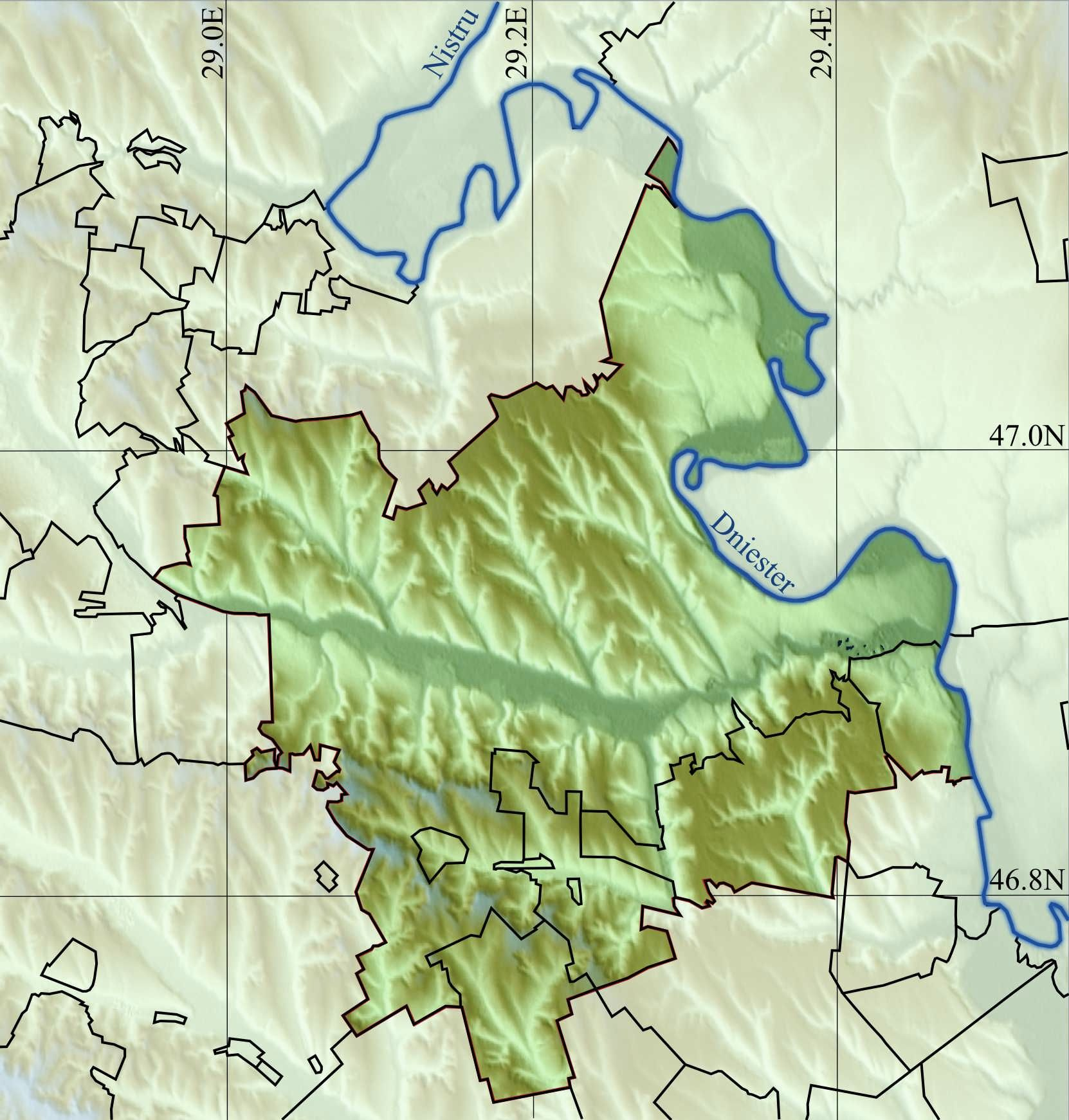
- Location within Anenii Noi District Location within Moldova
- Coordinates: 46°54′N 29°23′E
- Country: Moldova
- District: Anenii Noi District

Population (2014)
  - Total: 2,098
- Time zone: UTC+2 (EET)
  - Summer (DST): UTC+3 (EEST)
- Climate: Cfb

Calfa is a commune in the Anenii Noi District of the Republic of Moldova. It is composed of two villages, Calfa and Calfa Nouă.
