= Șerpeni =

- Village
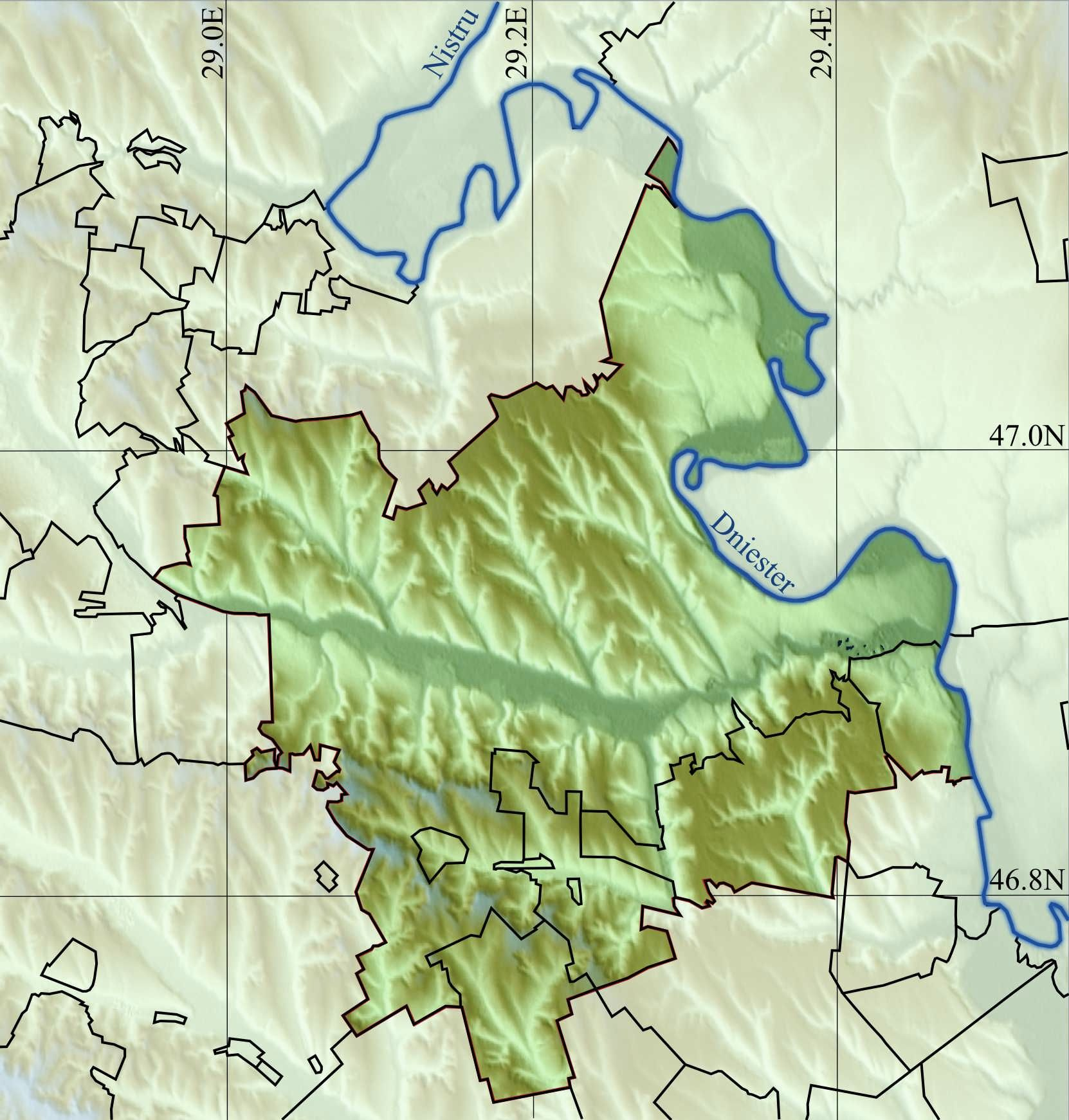
- Location within Anenii Noi District Location within Moldova
- Coordinates: 47°01′N 29°21′E
- Country: Moldova
- District: Anenii Noi District

Population (2014 census)
  - Total: 3,372
- Time zone: UTC+2 (EET)
  - Summer (DST): UTC+3 (EEST)

Șerpeni is a village in the Anenii Noi District of Moldova.
