= Maximovca =

- Village
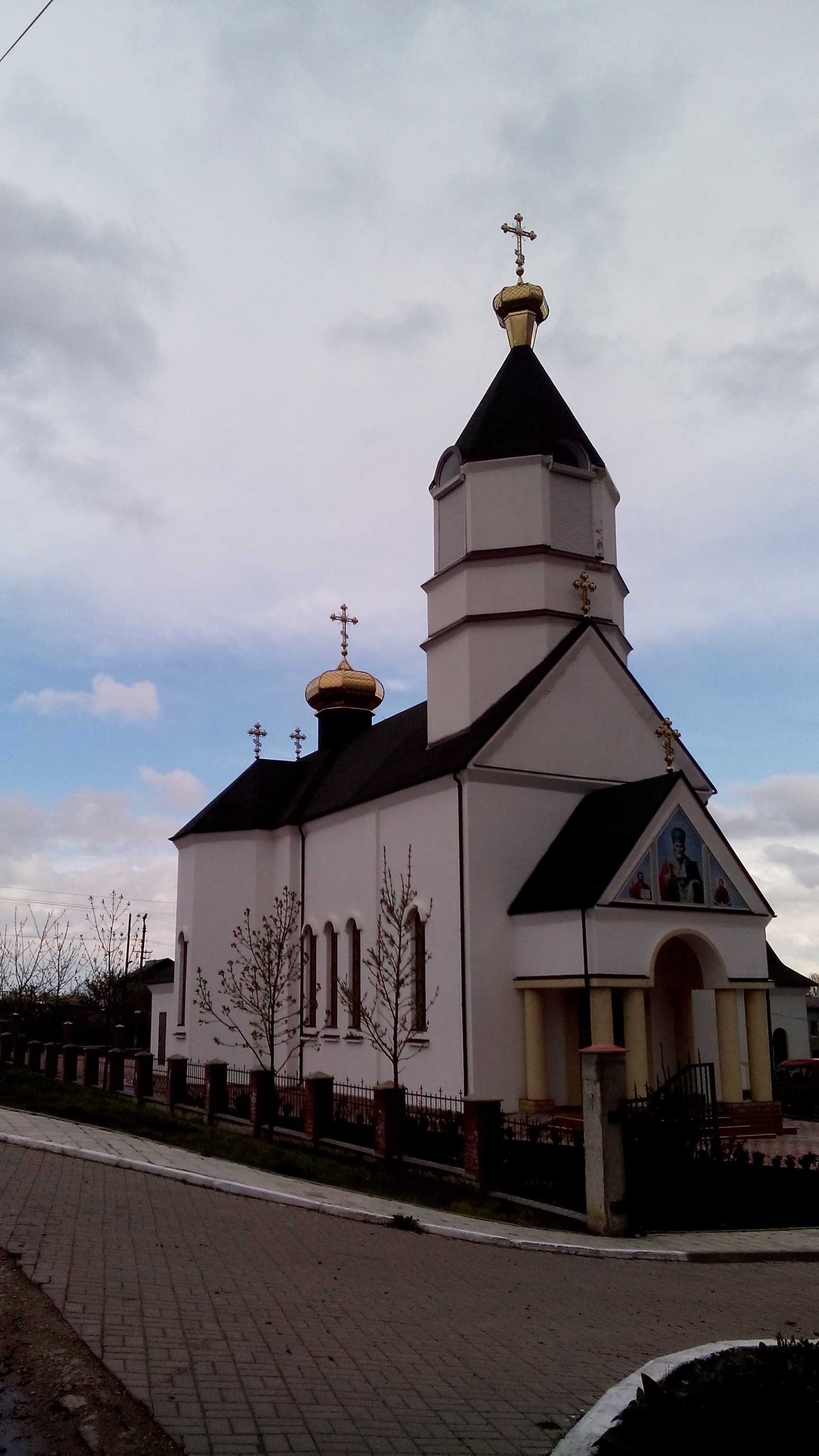
- Saint Nicholas church of Maximovca

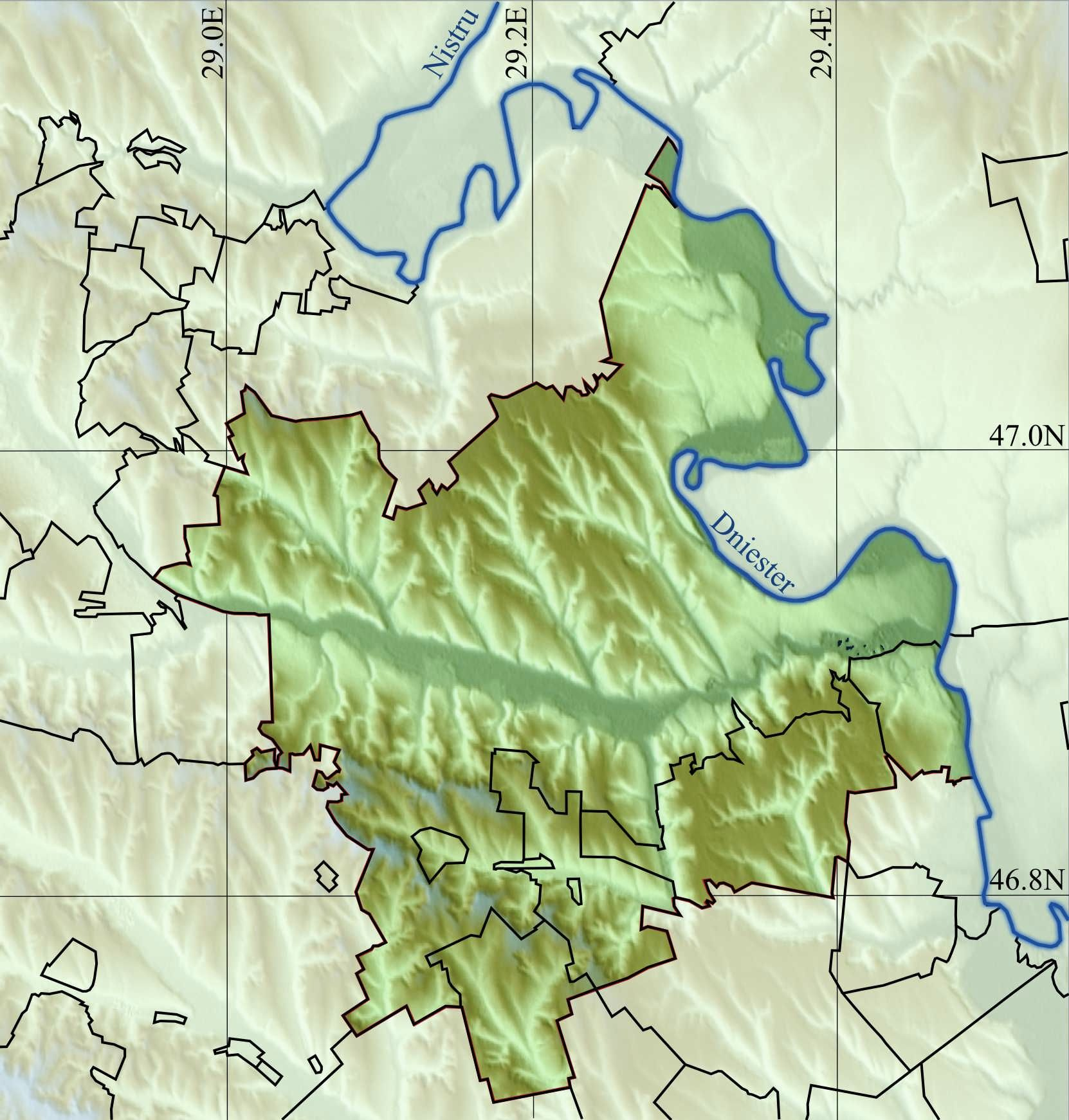
- Location within Anenii Noi District Location within Moldova
- Coordinates: 47°01′N 29°01′E
- Country: Moldova
- District: Anenii Noi District

Government
  - mayor: Svirida Maria

Population (2014 census)
  - Total: 2,212
- Time zone: UTC+2 (EET)
  - Summer (DST): UTC+3 (EEST)
- Postal code: 6525

Maximovca is a village in the Anenii Noi District of Moldova.
