= Botnărești =

Botnăreşti
- Commune
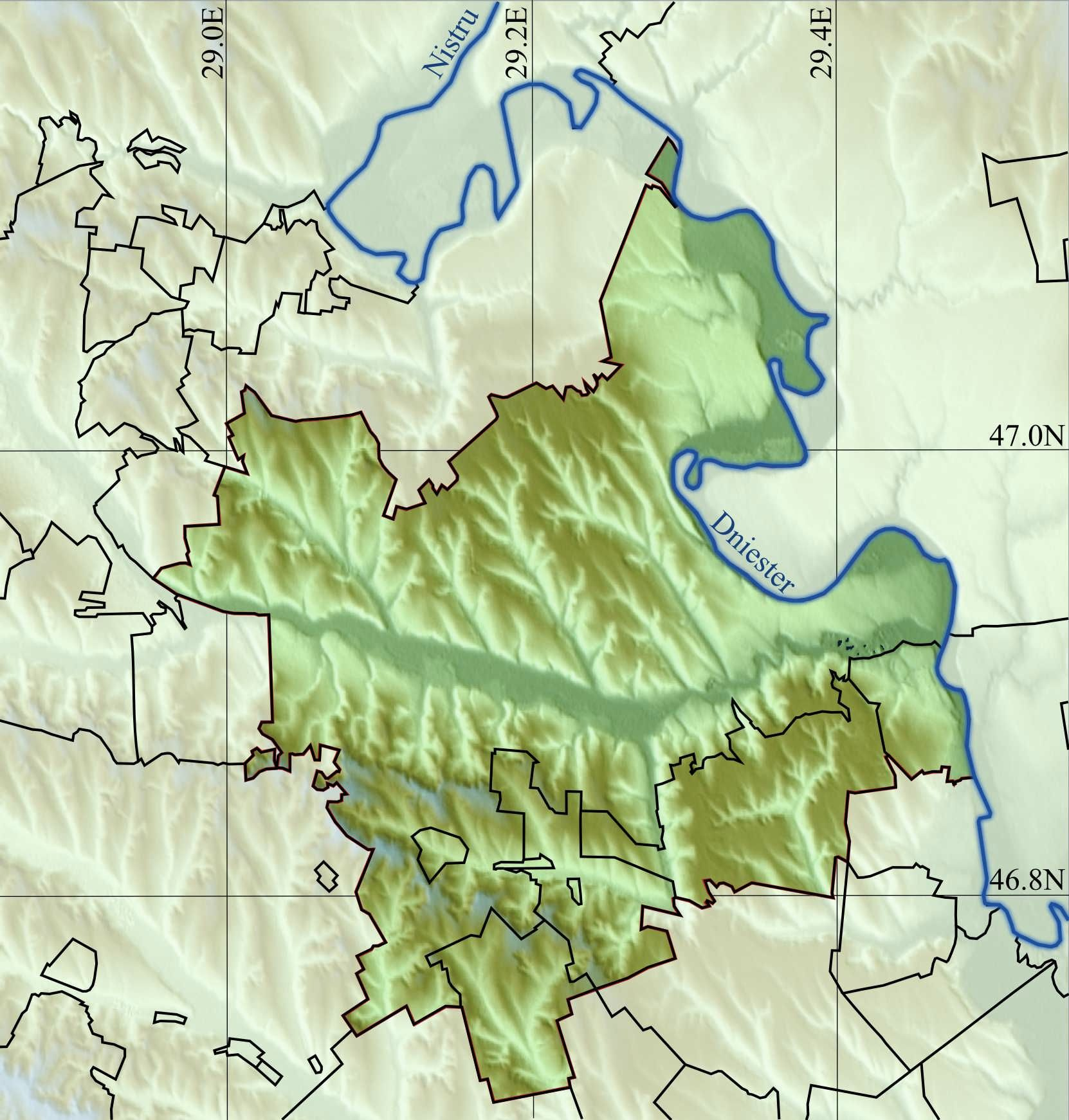
- Location within Anenii Noi District Location within Moldova
- Coordinates: 46°56′N 29°10′E
- Country: Moldova
- District: Anenii Noi District

Population (2014)
  - Total: 1,003
- Time zone: UTC+2 (EET)
  - Summer (DST): UTC+3 (EEST)
- Climate: Cfb

Botnărești is a commune in the Anenii Noi District of the Republic of Moldova. It is composed of two villages, Botnărești and Salcia.
