= Anenii Noi District =

Coordinates: 46°55′N 29°15′E

Anenii Noi
- District (Raion)
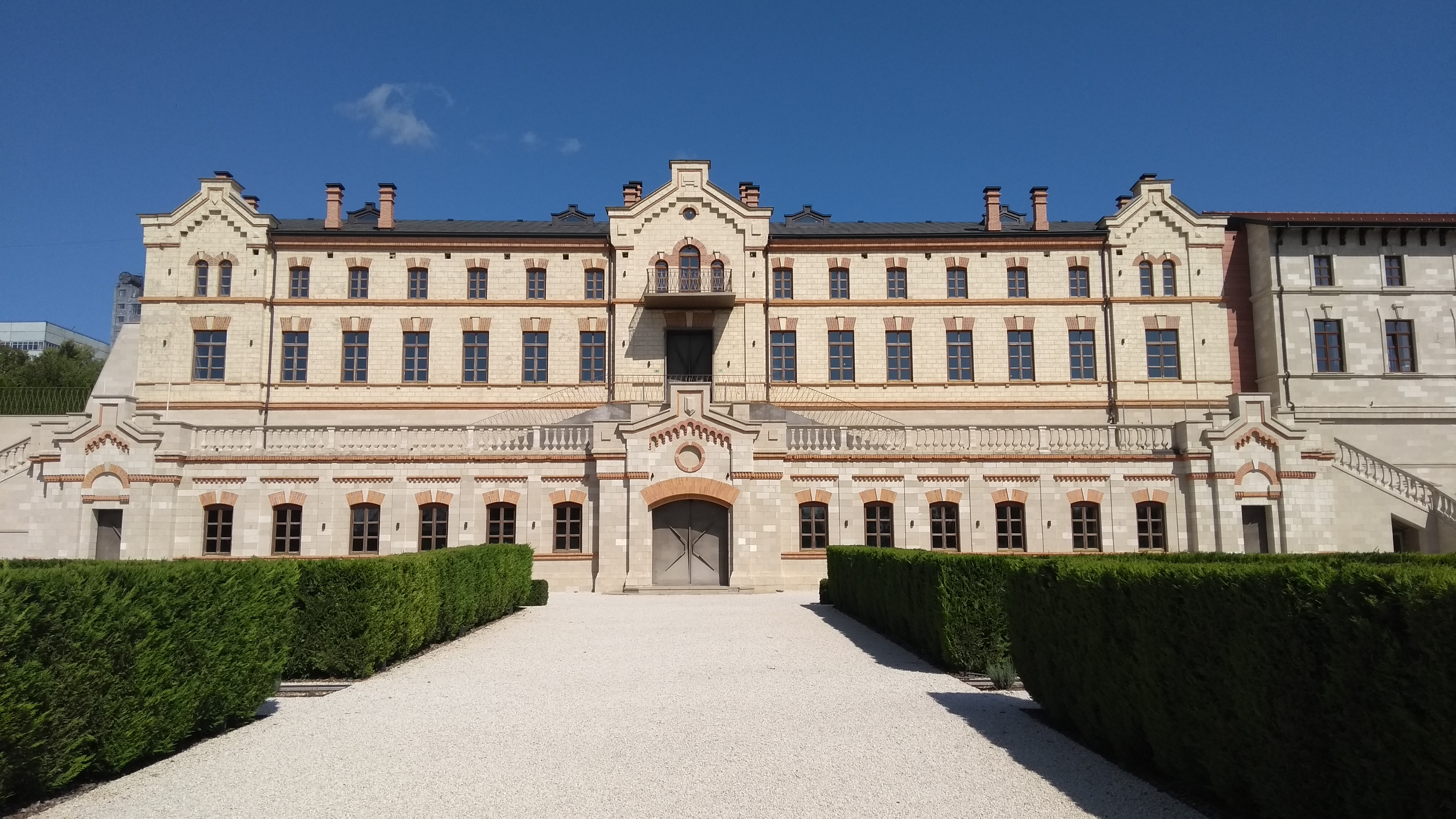
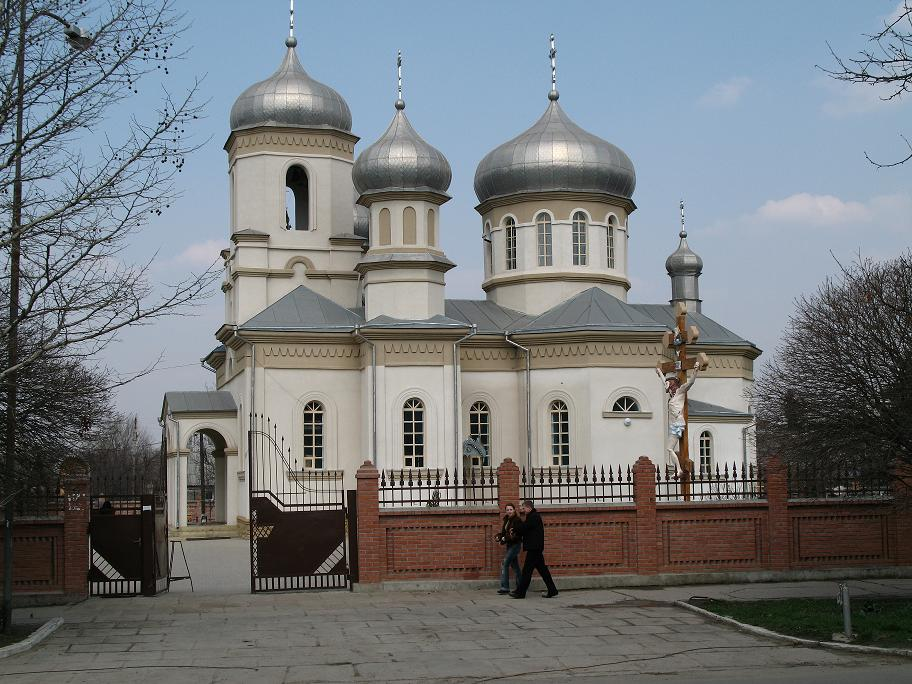
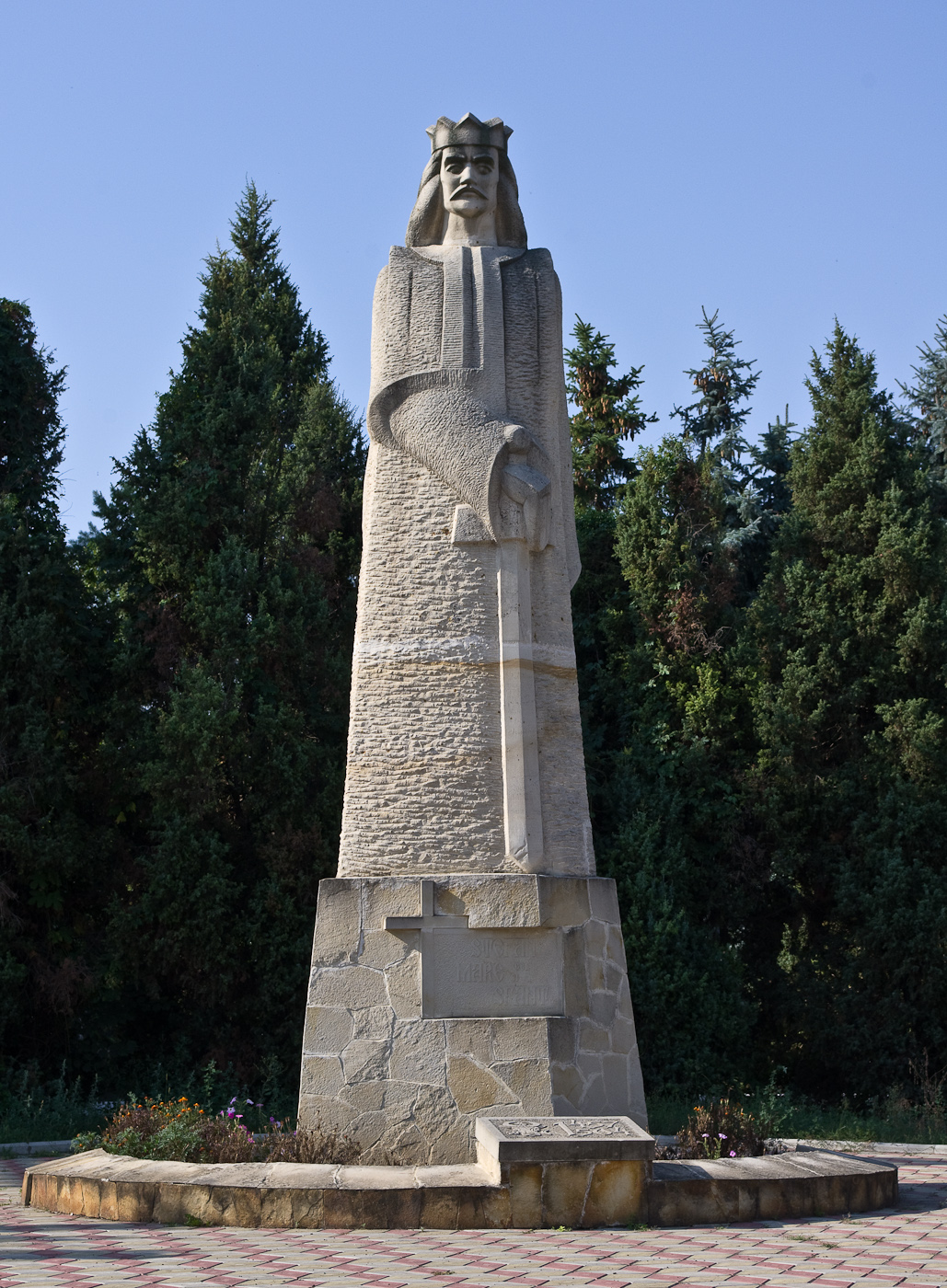
- From the top, Mimi Castle, Saint Demetrius church of Anenii Noi, Statue of Ștefan cel Mare

- Flag Coat of arms

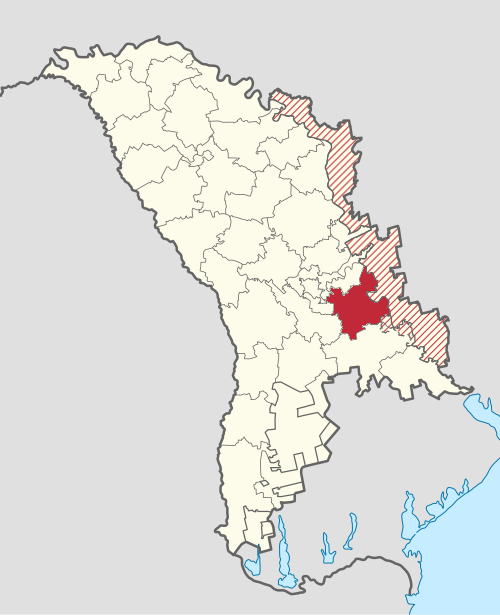
- Country: Republic of Moldova
- Administrative center (Oraș-reședință): Anenii Noi
- Established: 2003

Government
  - Raion President: Alexandr Moisei (PAS, 2023)

Area
  - Total: 887.6 km^{2} (342.7 sq mi)

Population (2024)
  - Total: 57,687
  - Density: 65/km^{2} (170/sq mi)
- Time zone: UTC+2 (EET)
  - Summer (DST): UTC+3 (EEST)
- Area code: +373 65
- Car plates: AN
- Website: www.aneniinoi.com

Anenii Noi District (Romanian: Raionul Anenii Noi, pronunciation: [aˈnenij ˈnoj]) is a district (raion) in the central part of Moldova. As of 2024, its population was 57,687. Its seat is the city of Anenii Noi.

== History ==
Localities with the oldest documentary attestation are Gura Bîcului, Teliţa, Mereni documented for the first time in 1443–1475. The following centuries shows development in the economy (trade, agriculture, customs duties), and a significant demographic growth. The first documentary of the city Anenii Noi is June 27, 1731, with the name Pascani pe Bîc. In 1812, after the Russo-Turkish War (1806–1812), is the occupation of Basarabia, Russian Empire during this period (1812–1917), there was an intense russification of the native population. In 1918 after the collapse of the Russian Empire, Bessarabia united with Romania in the period (1918–1940, 1941–1944), the district was part of the Chişinău County. In 1940 after Molotov–Ribbentrop Treaty, Basarabia is occupied by the USSR. In 1991 as a result of the proclamation of Independence of Moldova, part and residence of the Chişinău County (1991–2003), and in 2003 became administrative unit of Moldova.

== Geography ==
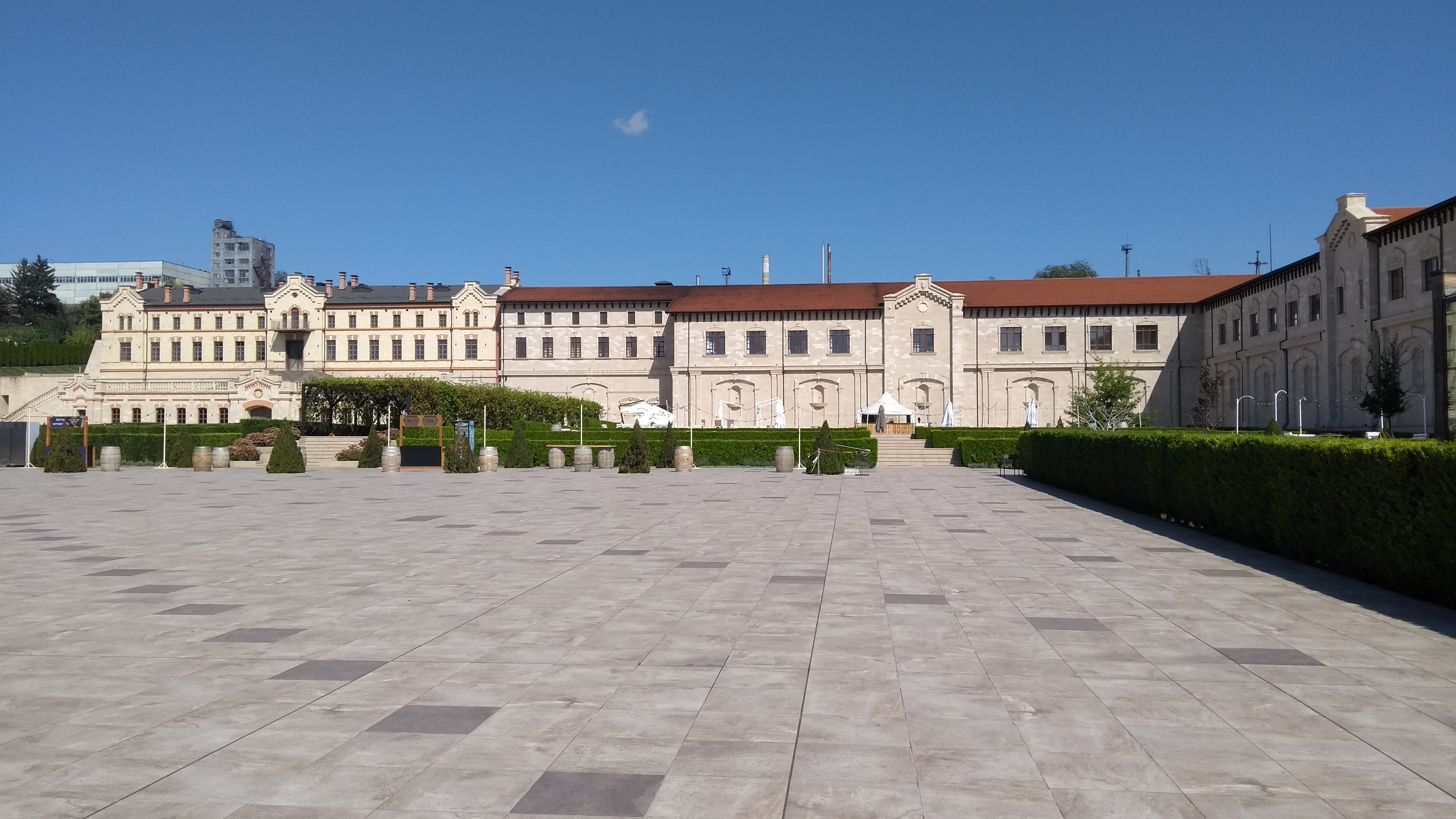
General view of Mimi Castle.

Anenii Noi District is located in the central part of Moldova. Neighborhood has the following district: Criuleni District in north, east Grigoriopol District, Căuşeni District in south, Ialoveni District and Municipality of Chişinău in the west. Flat relief, the plain. Altitudes range from 30 m in the Lower Nistru plain, to 200–250 m in the hills of northern district. Erosion processes with a low intensity.

=== Climate ===
Temperate continental climate with annual average temperature 10 °C (50 °F), July average temperature 22 °C (72 °F), January average temperature −4 °C (25 °F). Yearly precipitation 500–600 mm. Average wind speed 3–5 m\s.

=== Fauna ===
Fauna typical of central Europe this mammals such as foxes, hedgehogs, deer, wild boar, ermine, ferret and more. Of birds: owl, stork, hawk, sparrow, starling, crow, egret, partridges and others.

=== Flora ===
Forests occupy 10.7% of the district and are complemented by oak, english oak, hornbeam, maple, linden, ash and others. From plants: wormwood, black, clover, knotweed, nettle, fescue and more.

=== Rivers ===
Anenii Noi District is located in the Nistru river basin, which crosses the district in the east. The most important tributary of this is Bîc River (155 km). The largest lake is Lake Sălaș located near locality Gura Bîcului, with an area of 3.72 km^{2} (1.44 sq mi). It is the third largest natural lake in Moldova.

== Administrative subdivisions ==
Anenii Noi District has 1 town, 25 communes and 19 villages.

=== Cities ===
- Anenii Noi

=== Communes and villages ===
- Botnăreşti
  - Salcia
- Bulboaca
- Calfa
  - Calfa Nouă
- Chetrosu
  - Todireşti
- Chirca
  - Botnăreştii Noi
- Ciobanovca
  - Balmaz
  - Mirnoe
  - Troiţa Nouă
- Cobusca Nouă
- Cobusca Veche
  - Floreşti
- Delacău
- Floreni
- Geamăna
  - Batîc
- Gura Bîcului
- Hîrbovăţ
- Maximovca
- Mereni
- Merenii Noi
- Ochiul Roş
  - Picus
- Puhăceni
- Roşcani
- Speia
- Şerpeni
- Teliţa
  - Teliţa Nouă
- Ţînţăreni
  - Creţoaia
- Varniţa
- Zolotievca
  - Larga
  - Nicolaevca

== Demographics ==
In the 2024 Census, the district population was 57,687 of which 11.5% urban and 88.5% rural population

=== Ethnic groups ===
Ethnic group	% of total
Moldovans *	82.6
Ukrainians	4.2
Romanians *	6.5
Russians	2.9
Bulgarians	0.5
Gagauz	0.3
Romani	0.3
Other	0.5
Undeclared	0.1

Footnote: * There is an ongoing controversy regarding the ethnic identification of Moldovans and Romanians.

=== Religion ===
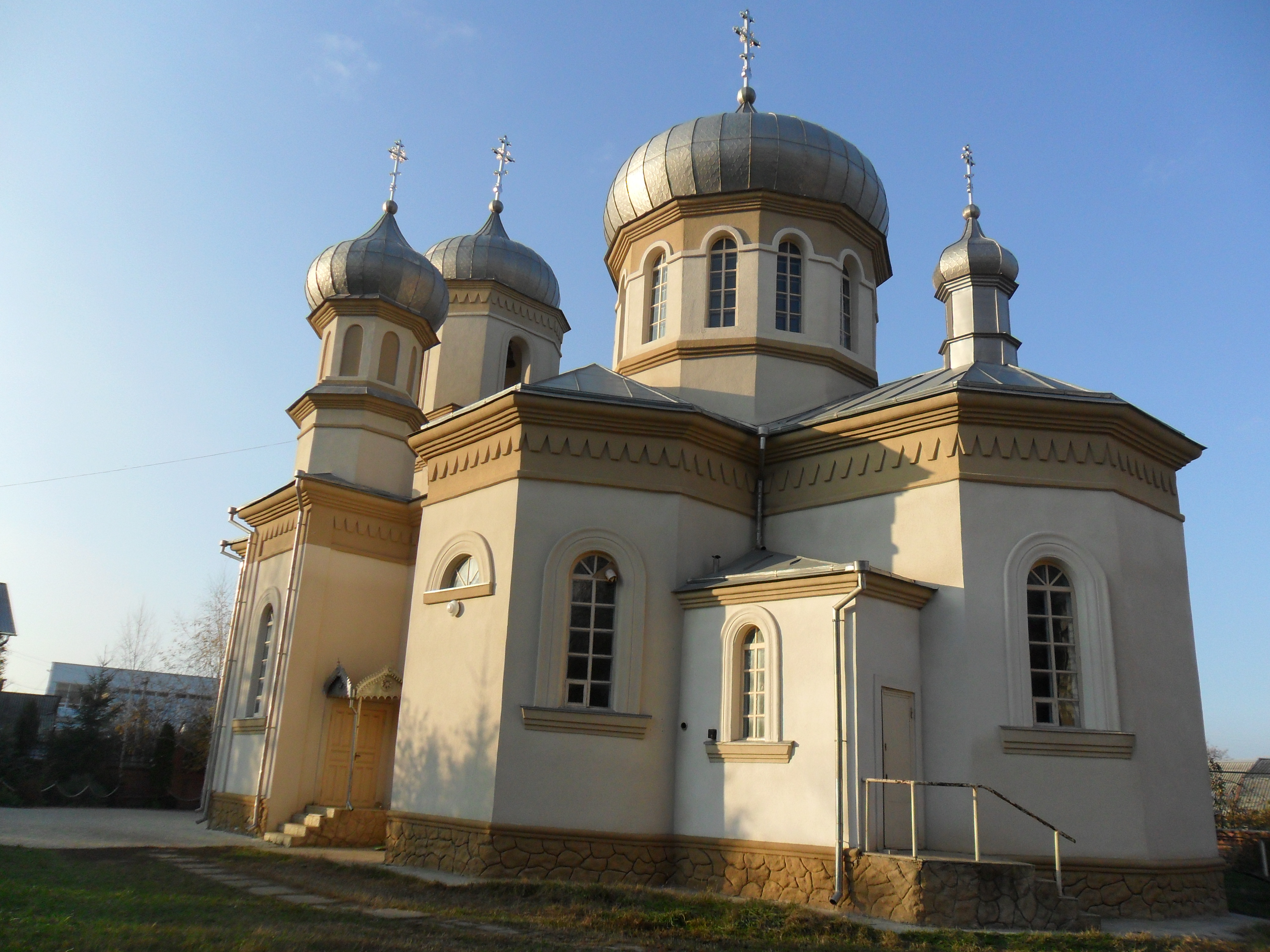
Church of St. Dumitru, city of Anenii Noi

- Christians – 96.7%
  - Orthodox Christians – 96.1%
  - Protestant – 1.7%
  - Catholics – 0.1%
  - Muslim - 0.2%
- Other – 0.1%
- No Religion – 0.8%
- Not declared - 0.9%

== Economy ==
There are 12,555 businesses registered in the district. The share of agricultural land is 66,673 ha (74.7%) of total land area. The arable land occupies 52,161 ha (58.5%) of the total area of agricultural land: 2996 ha (3.4%), plantations of orchards, 3826 ha (4.3%) of vineyards, 4497 ha (5.0%) pastures, 335 ha (0.4%) others.

== Education ==
The district Anenii Noi, 36 educational institutions operate. Total number of students: 10,867 students in schools, 120 children polyvalent vocational schools. Currently the schools in the district operates 860 teachers.

== Politics ==
Voters in the district Anenii Noi, said mainly center-right parties, particularly the AEI. PCRM the last three elections is in a continuous fall.

During the last three elections AEI had an increase of 79.7%

Parliament elections results
Year	AEI	PCRM
2010	50.23% 21,670	44.12% 19,034
July 2009	48.48% 19,102	47.92% 18,882
April 2009	32.77% 12,057	53.80% 19,799

=== Elections ===
Summary of 28 November 2010 Parliament of Moldova election results in Anenii Noi District
Parties and coalitions	Votes	%	+/−
Party of Communists of the Republic of Moldova	19,034	44.12	−3.80
Liberal Democratic Party of Moldova	13,380	31.02	+12.98
Democratic Party of Moldova	4,406	10,21	-0.84
Liberal Party	3,292	7.63	−6.63
European Action Movement	763	1.76	+1.76
Party Alliance Our Moldova	591	1.37	−3.76
Other Party	2,452	5.65	+2.05
Total (turnout 60.14%)	43,421	100.00	

== Culture ==
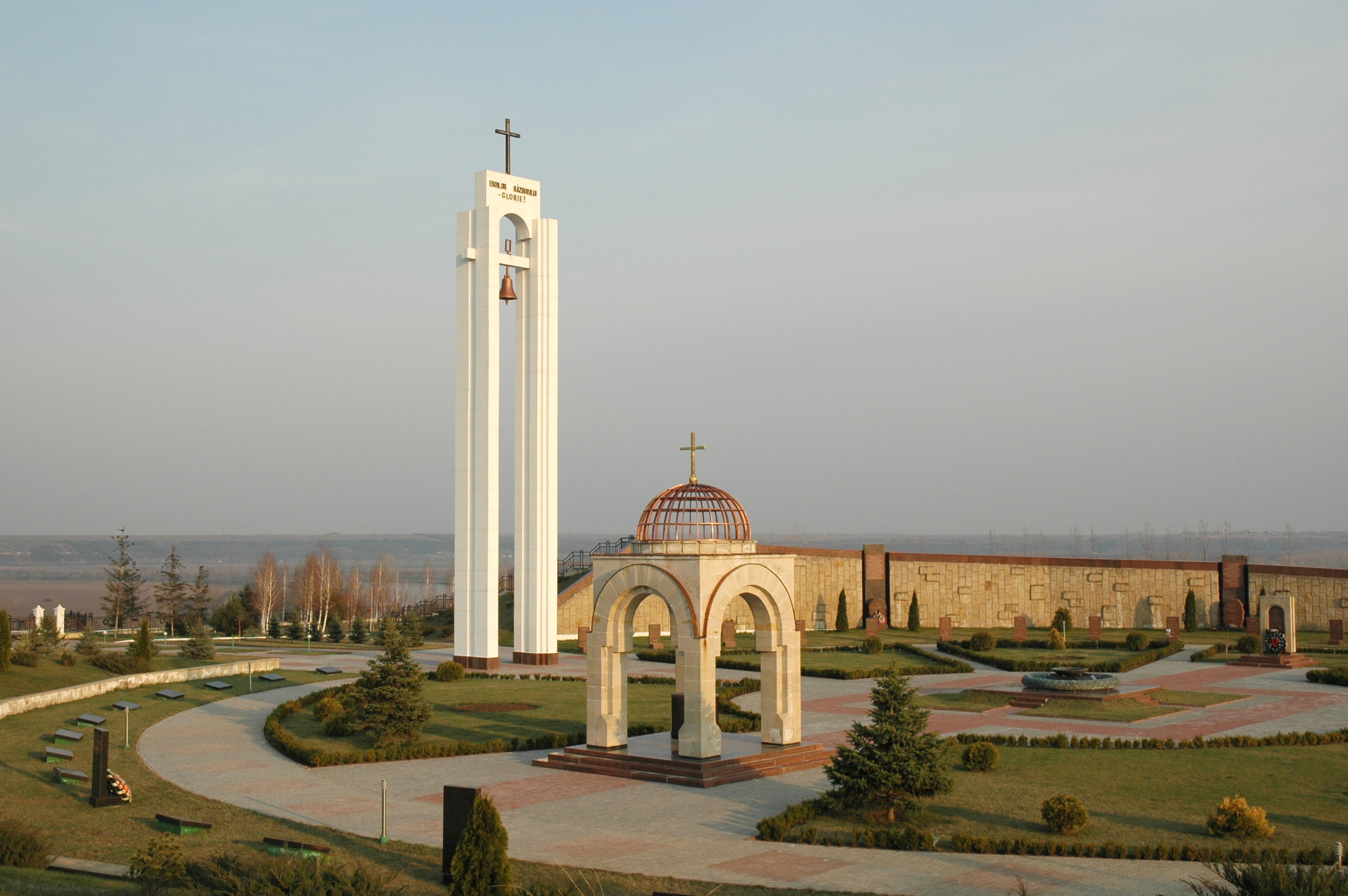
Serpeni World War II Memorial

The district Anenii Noi operates: 65 artistic, two art schools, 18 teams, holding the title of the band model, 37 public libraries.

== Health ==
The district works: a hospital with general fund of 188 beds, a center of family doctors in the composition of which there are 16 offices of family doctors, 13 health centers, 11 health points. In health care population Anenii Noi District operates: 123 doctors, 356 average staff, nurses, 348 medical and auxiliary personnel.
