= Telița =

Teliţa
- Commune
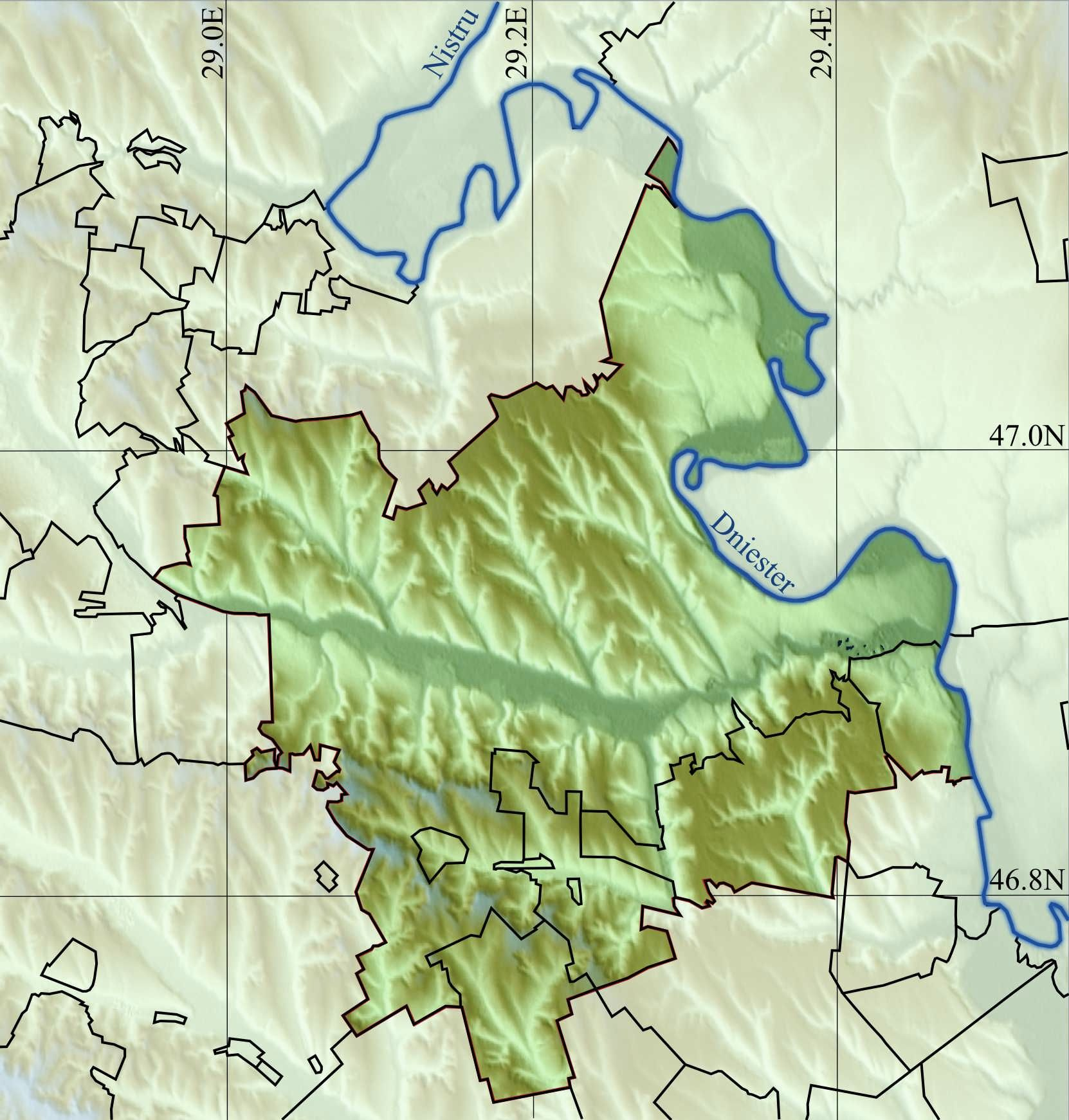
- Location within Anenii Noi District Location within Moldova
- Coordinates: 46°57′N 29°18′E
- Country: Moldova
- District: Anenii Noi District

Population (2014)
  - Total: 1,099
- Time zone: UTC+2 (EET)
  - Summer (DST): UTC+3 (EEST)

Telița is a commune in Anenii Noi District, Moldova. It is composed of two villages, Telița and Telița Nouă.
