= Țînțăreni, Anenii Noi =

Țînțăreni
- Commune
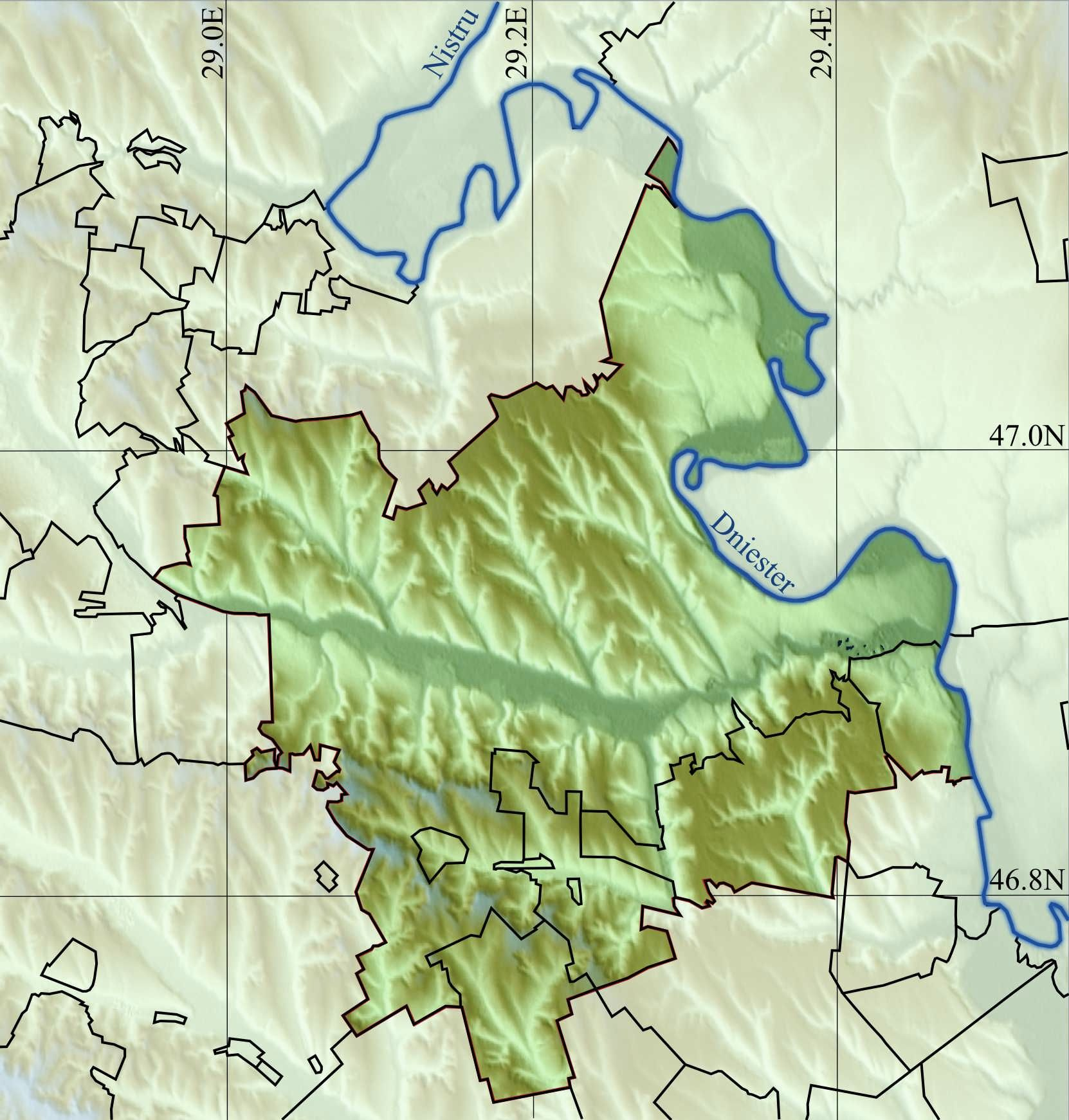
- Location within Anenii Noi District Location within Moldova
- Coordinates: 46°54′N 29°08′E
- Country: Moldova
- District: Anenii Noi District

Population (2014)
  - Total: 3,221
- Time zone: UTC+2 (EET)
  - Summer (DST): UTC+3 (EEST)
- Postal code: 6538
- Area code: 6500

Țînțăreni is a commune in the Anenii Noi District of Moldova. It is composed of two villages, Crețoaia and Țînțăreni.

First mention of the village was in 1659 (named Luțeni).
