= Merenii Noi =

- Village
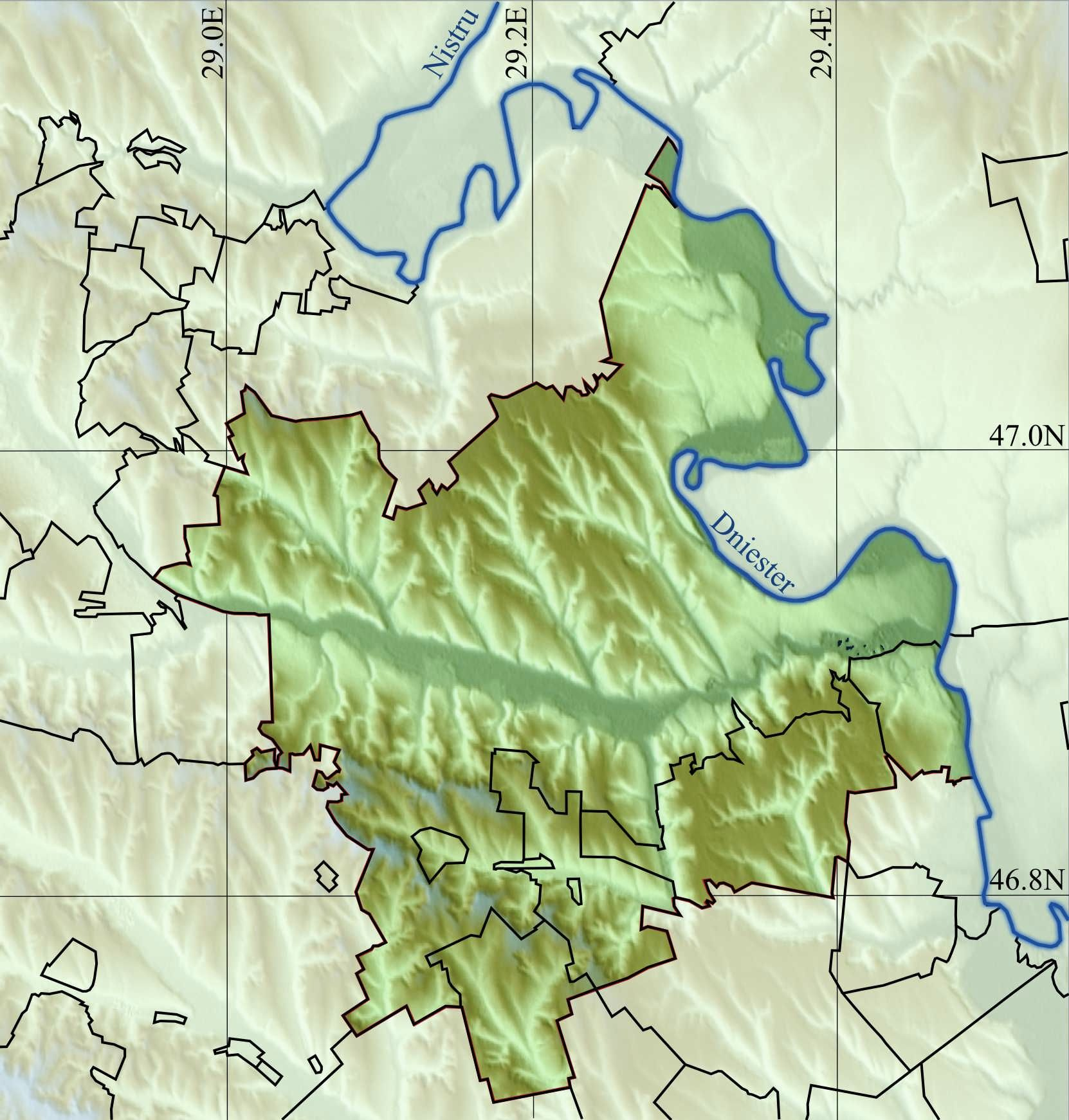
- Location within Anenii Noi District Location within Moldova
- Coordinates: 46°55′N 29°03′E
- Country: Moldova
- District: Anenii Noi District

Government
  - Mayor: Lilia Antoci

Population (2014 census)
  - Total: 1,454
- Time zone: UTC+2 (EET)
  - Summer (DST): UTC+3 (EEST)

Merenii Noi is a village in the Anenii Noi District of Moldova. It is home to the Dionysos-Mereni SA winery. Of 1,512 inhabitants, 1,303 are ethnic Romanians, 66 Ukrainians, 67 Russians, 30 Gagauzes, 28 Bulgarians, 1 Jew, 10 Gypsies, and 7 other/undeclared.
