= Mereni, Anenii Noi =

Mereni
- Commune and village
- Interactive map of Mereni
- Country: Moldova
- District: Anenii Noi District

Population (2014 census)
  - Total: 5,757
- Time zone: UTC+2 (EET)
  - Summer (DST): UTC+3 (EEST)

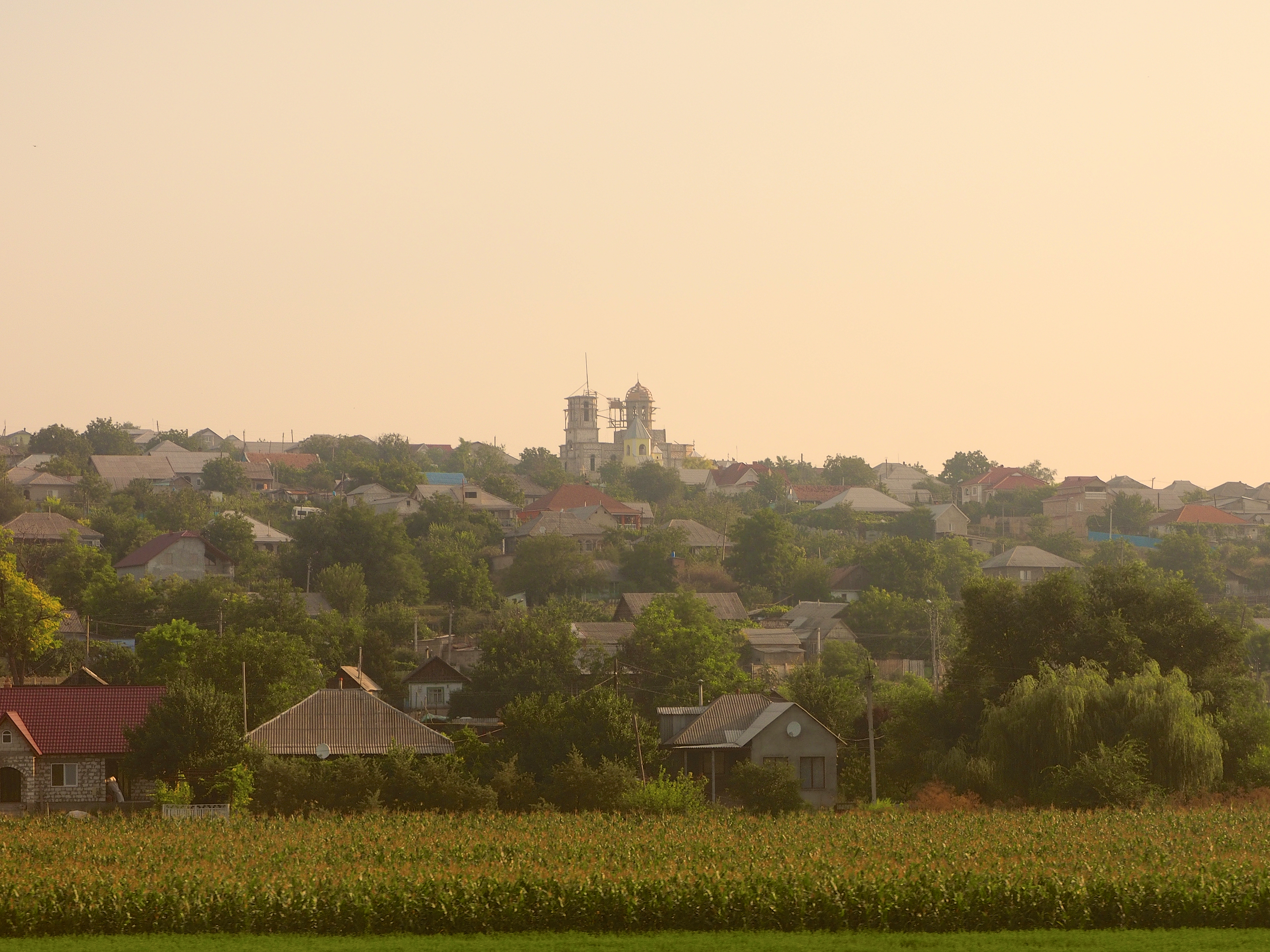
An image of Mereni, Anenii Noi

Mereni is a commune and village in the Anenii Noi District of Moldova.
