= Zolotievca =

- Commune
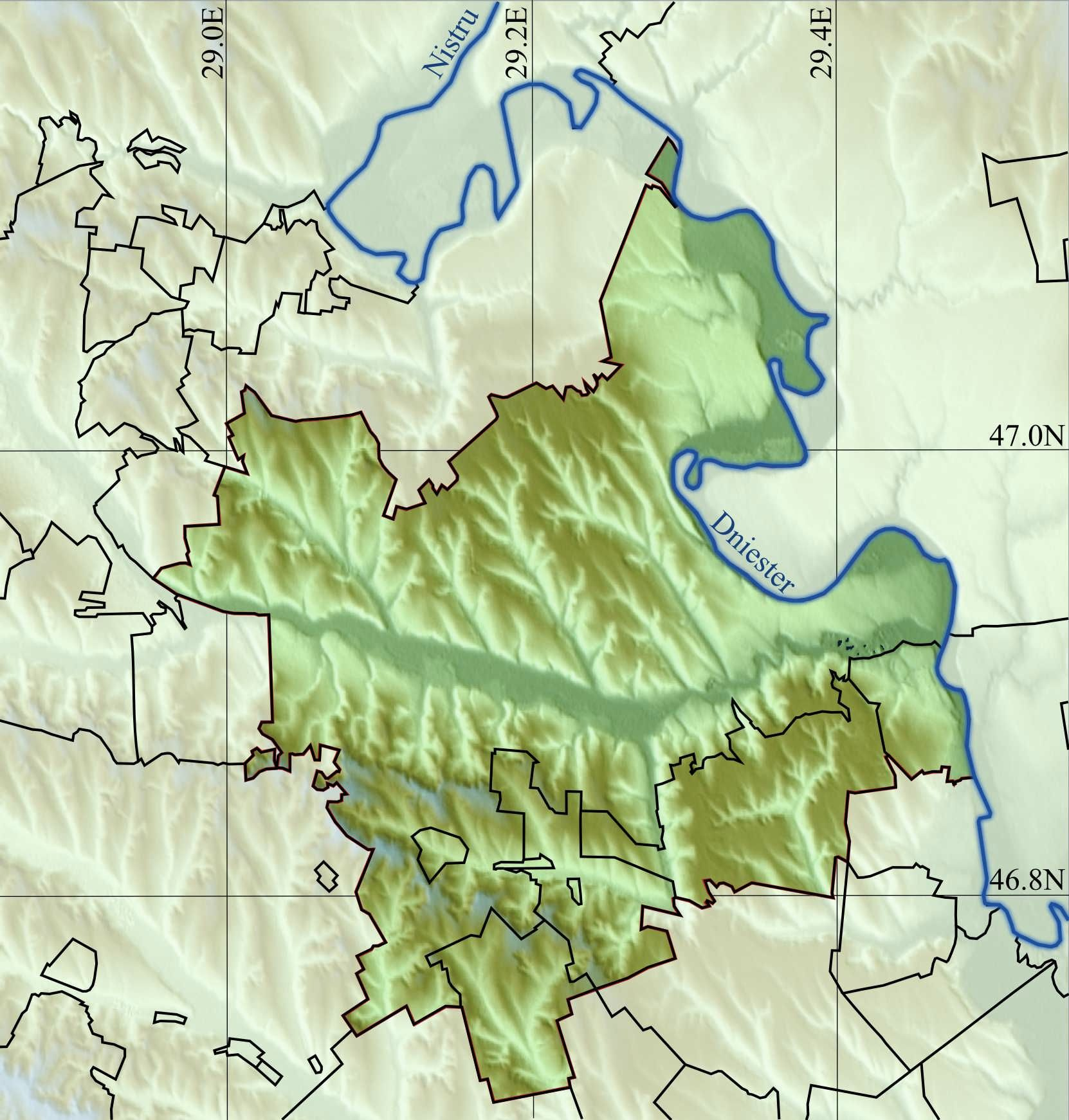
- Location within Anenii Noi District Location within Moldova
- Coordinates: 46°44′N 29°11′E
- Country: Moldova
- District: Anenii Noi District

Population (2014)
  - Total: 807
- Time zone: UTC+2 (EET)
  - Summer (DST): UTC+3 (EEST)

Zolotievca is a commune in the Anenii Noi District of Moldova. It is composed of three villages: Larga, Nicolaevca and Zolotievca.
