= Țînțăreni, Telenești =

- Commune
- Location of Țînțăreni, Telenești
- Coordinates: 47°34′13″N 28°33′45″E
- Country: Moldova
- District: Telenești

Population (2014 census)
  - Total: 1,636
- Time zone: UTC+2 (EET)
  - Summer (DST): UTC+3 (EEST)
- Phone Prefix: 258
- Vehicle registration: TL

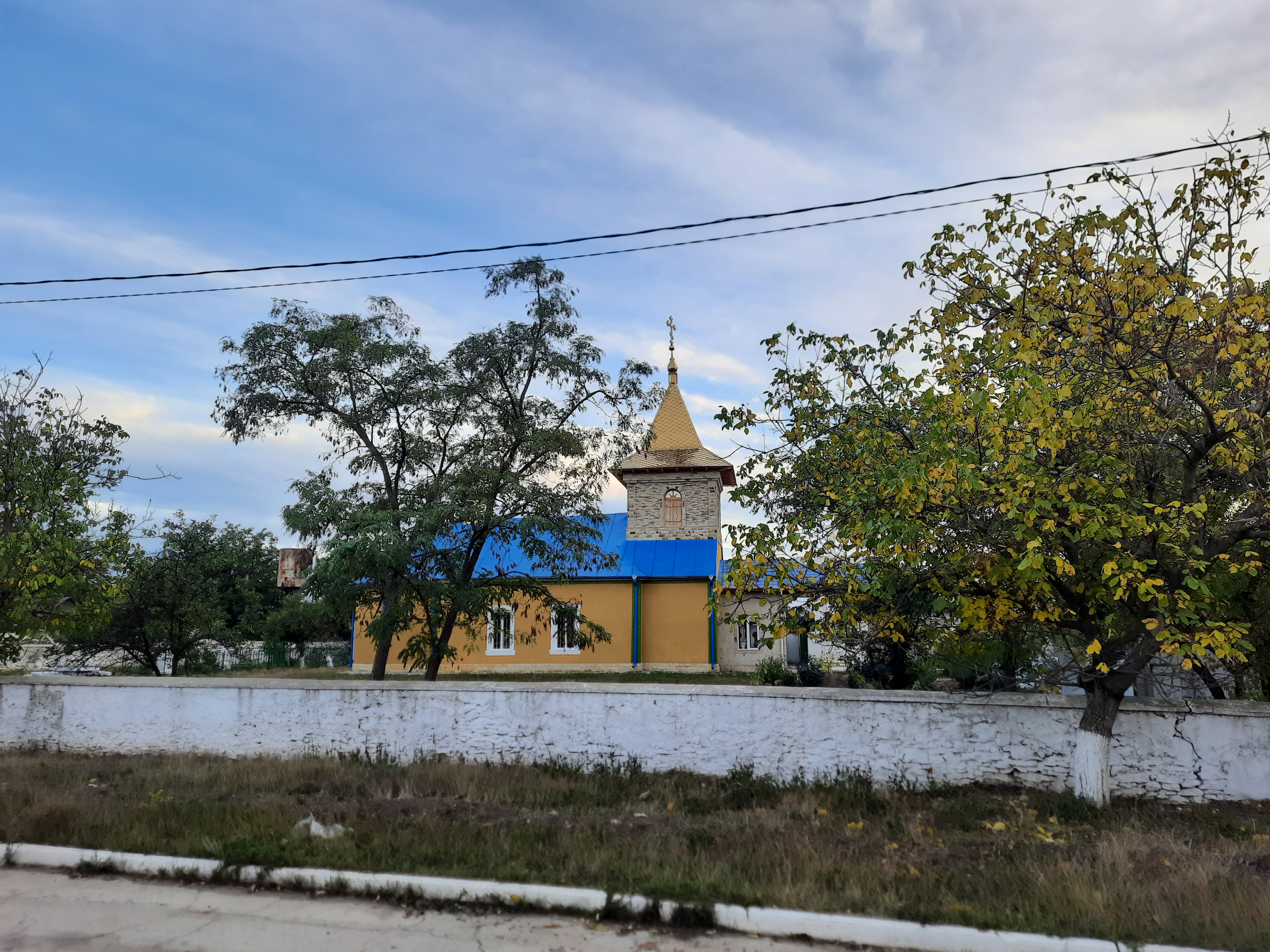
Biserica Cultural monument

Țînțăreni is a village in Telenești District, Moldova.
