= Nicolaevca =

- Commune
- Location within Moldova
- Coordinates: 47.9819444444°N 28.7036111111°E
- Country: Moldova
- District: Florești District
- Elevation: 220 m (720 ft)

Population (2014)
  - Total: 923
- Time zone: UTC+2 (EET)
  - Summer (DST): UTC+3 (EEST)
- Postal code: MD-6642

Nicolaevca is a commune in Florești District, Moldova. It is composed of two villages, Nicolaevca and Valea Rădoaiei.
