= Camenca (Prut) =

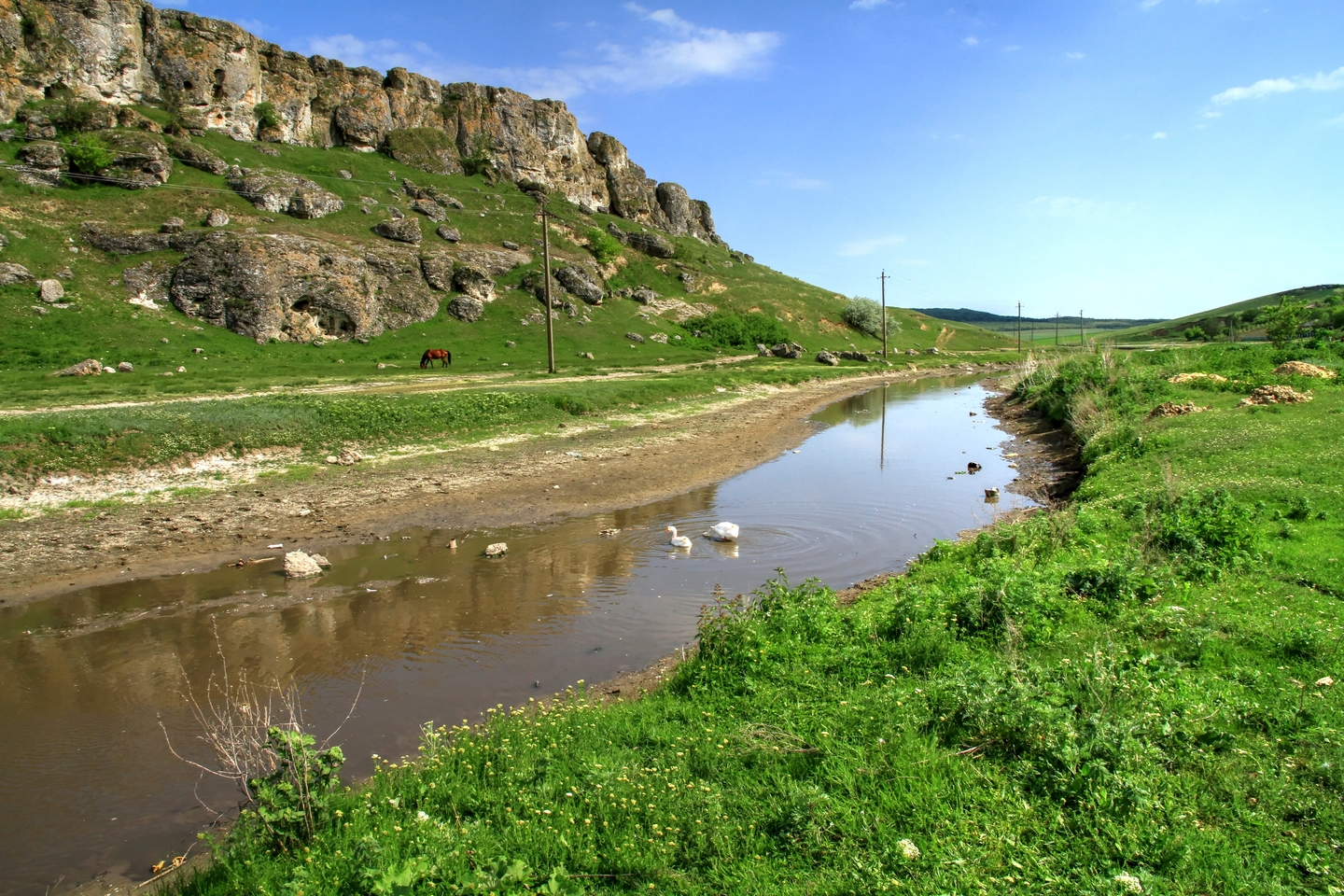

Location
- Country: Moldova

Physical characteristics
- Mouth
  - location: Prut at Pruteni
  - coordinates: 47.4846°N 27.5410°E
- Length: 93 km (58 mi)

Basin features
- Progression: Prut→ Danube→ Black Sea

The Camenca is a 93 km (58 mi) long left tributary of the river Prut in western Moldova. It flows through the villages Borosenii Noi, Alexăndrești, Camenca, Cobani, Balatina, Cuhnești, Chetriș and Călinești, and it discharges into the Prut near the village Pruteni.
