= Glodeni District =

Coordinates: 47°45′N 27°30′E

Glodeni
- District (Raion)
- Flag Coat of arms

- Country: Republic of Moldova
- Administrative center (Oraş-reşedinţă): Glodeni
- Established: 2002

Government
  - Raion President: Oxana Albu (2023) (PDCM)

Area
  - Total: 754 km^{2} (291 sq mi)
- Elevation: 250 m (820 ft)

Population (2024)
  - Total: 35,829
  - Density: 47.5/km^{2} (123/sq mi)
- Time zone: UTC+2 (EET)
  - Summer (DST): UTC+3 (EEST)
- Area code: +373 49
- Car plates: GL
- Website: www.glodeni.md

Glodeni District (Romanian pronunciation: [ɡloˈdenʲ]) is a district (Romanian: raion) in northwestern Moldova, with its administrative center at Glodeni. As of the 2024 Moldovan census, its population was 35,829. The district consists of 35 localities, 18 communes, 16 villages and one city (Glodeni).

== History ==
The oldest area in the district is the Cobani, which dates back to June 3, 1374. Other old localities include Balatina, Camenca, Cuhnești, and Iabloana, founded between 1429 and 1442. During the 15th–17th centuries Glodeni continued to develop as a trade and economic region, with a significant increase in population. In 1616, a district center was documented as Glodeni.

Since the 17th and 18th centuries, the region has been fueled by wars with the Polish–Lithuanian Commonwealth and the Ottoman and Russian Empires. In 1812, the region was occupied by the Russian Empire; with the local population of Moldovans and Ukrainians, Russians constitute 22 percent of the population. After the collapse of the Russian Empire in 1917, Bessarabia decided to unite with Romania. In 1940, Bessarabia was occupied by the USSR after the Molotov–Ribbentrop pact. From 1944 to 1991, the Glodeni District was part of the Moldavian Soviet Socialist Republic (MSSR). After the 1991 independence of Moldova, the Glodeni District was part of Bălți County until 2003, when it became a district.

== Geography ==
Glodeni District is bordered by Riscani District on the north, Balti Municipality on the east, Falesti District on the south and Romania on the west. The district is a hilly plain, fragmented by valleys which are higher in the west with a slight incline to their merge with the Prut. In the western part of the district, the localities of Balatina, Cobani, Butesti, and Camenca possess a number of natural resources, including gravel and sand (near the Prut), building stone (Balatina, Butesti, Camenca, Cobani), limestone (Cuhnesti, Viişoara) and clay (Glodeni, Danu and Iabloana). Soils are primarily Chernozemic and loamy. The highest altitude in the district is 250 metres (820 ft), in the west.

=== Climate ===
The annual average temperature is 8.5 °C (47.3 °F) degrees. In January, the average temperature is −4.5 °C (23.9 °F) degrees and 20.5 °C (68.9 °F) degrees in July. Annual rainfall is 480–560 millimetres (19–22 in). In rainy years up to 750 millimetres (30 in) is possible, while in dry years it can be as little as 300–350 millimetres (12–14 in).

=== Fauna ===
The district has fauna typical of Central Europe, including fox, weasel, marten, deer, woodpecker, turtle dove and pheasant in forests and boar, ondatra, otter, duck, wild cat, egret near the Prut. gopher, field mice, rabbits and partridges inhabit the steppe regions.

=== Flora ===
Forests occupy 8.5 percent of the district, and consist of oak, acacia, poplar, ash, maple, elm and hazel. Undergrowth includes blackthorn and blackberry. Steppe and forest steppe vegetation includes grasses, knotweed, clover and wormwood.

=== Pădurea Domnească ===
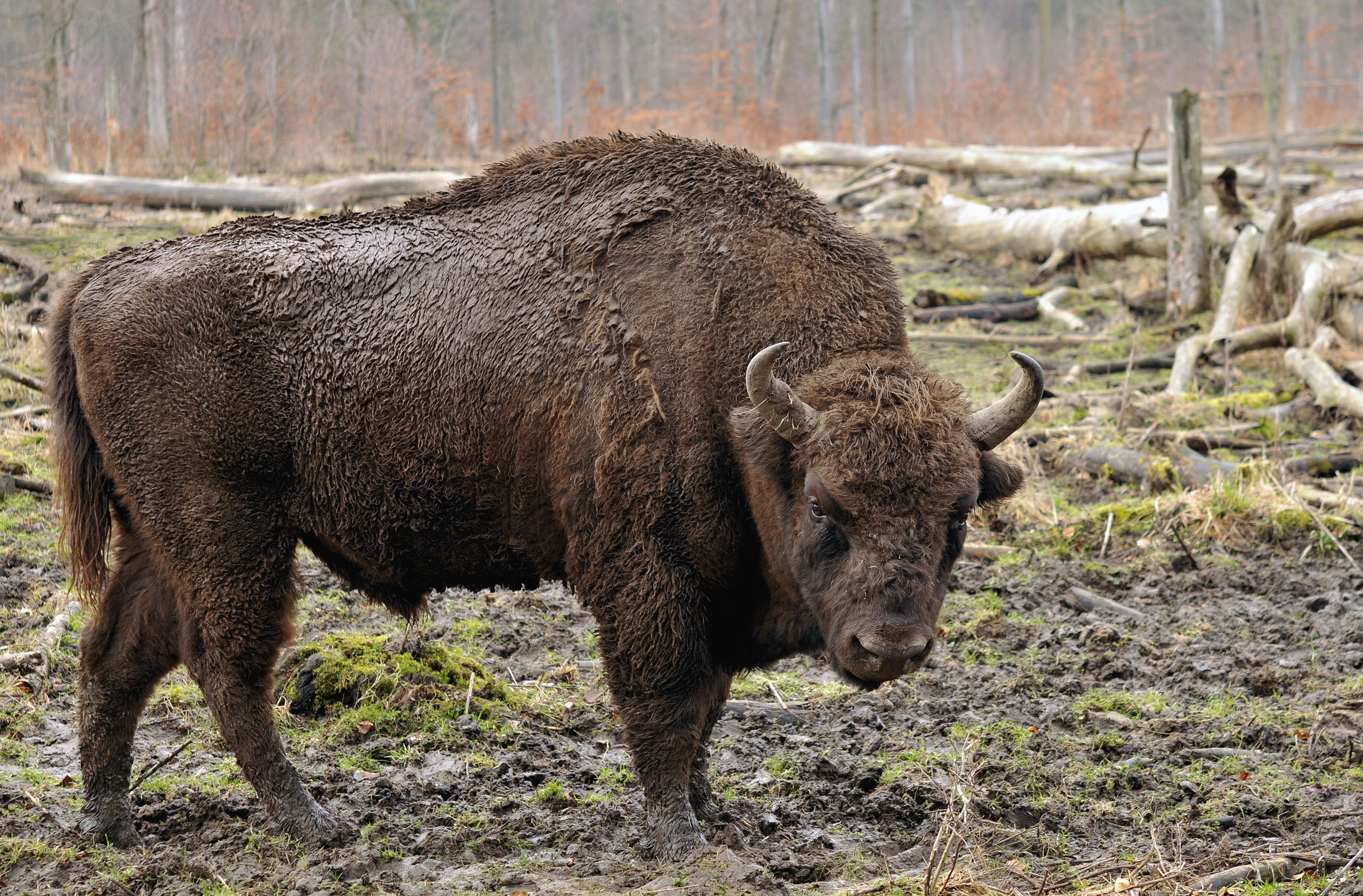
European bison were given to Moldova in 2006 by Poland; now they are found in the Pădurea Domnească nature reserve.

The Pădurea Domnească nature reserve is located in the mid-Prut Valley area, extending 40 kilometres (25 mi) between Criva and Pruteni. A forest under state protection since 1993, it is one of the most valuable meadows and old floodplain forests in Europe. The reserve covers an area of 6,039 hectares (14,920 acres), of which 3,054 hectares (7,550 acres) is forest. In the reserve are gorges, caves and waterfalls; a deposit of fossilized coral; over 3,500 prehistoric mounds of unknown origin; a 120 hectares (300 acres) prehistoric lake bed with trees reaching heights of 30–35 metres (98–115 ft) and a colony of over 1,000 herons which nest in the oaks.

=== Rivers ===
The Prut borders Romania. Smaller rivers include the Camenca, Căldăruşa and the Glodeni (in the Prut basin) and Copăceanca (in the Răut River basin). The district contains 1,900 hectares (4,700 acres) of lakes and ponds, which are popular summer retreats for tourists and local people.

== Demographics ==
According to the 2024 census, 35,829 inhabitants lived in Glodeni District, a decrease compared to the previous census in 2014, when 51,306 inhabitants were registered.

Ethnic composition of Glodeni District (2024)
1. Moldovans (Note: There is an ongoing controversy regarding the ethnic identification of Moldovans and Romanians.) (79.8%)
2. Romanians (4.90%)
3. Ukrainians (11.8%)
4. Russians (2.00%)
5. Romani (1.00%)
6. Others (0.50%)
Linguistic composition of Glodeni District (2024)
1. Moldovan (Note: In March 2023, the Parliament of Moldova passed a law updating all legislative texts and the constitution to refer to the national language as Romanian, effectively rendering the term "Moldovan" obsolete.) (62.4%)
2. Romanian (18.0%)
3. Russian (10.4%)
4. Ukrainian (8.20%)
5. Romani (0.80%)
6. Other (0.10%)

Historical population
Year	Pop.	±%
2004	60,975	—
2014	51,306	−15.9%
2024	35,829	−30.2%

=== Religion ===
- Christian Orthodox - 96.5%
- Baptists - 1.1%
- Other - 1.9%
- Irreligious - 0.3%
- Not stated - 0.2%

== Economy ==
The district has a total of 6,500 registered companies; however, agriculture is the most important sector. Agricultural land comprises 56,363 hectares (217.62 sq mi) (74.7 percent) of the total land area. Arable land comprises 42,300 hectares (163 sq mi) (56.1 percent) of total agricultural land, which includes orchards (2,192 hectares (5,420 acres), or 2.9 percent), vineyards (765 hectares (1,890 acres), or 1 percent) and pasture (10,780 hectares (26,600 acres), or 14.3 percent). Crops include sunflowers, sugar beets, tobacco and cereals. Livestock and milk production is practiced intensively only on farms in Danu and Sturzovca.

== Education ==
The district operates 32 kindergartens, two primary schools, 10 secondary schools, eight general-education schools and eight higher-education institutes serving a student population of 9,158. Vocational training is available in Glodeni and Ciuciulea.

== Politics ==
From 2001 to 2009, Glodeni District was part of the "north red" electoral region, in which the Party of Communists of the Republic of Moldova (PCRM) usually received over 50 percent of the vote. However, in the 2009 July elections the PCRM lost to the Alliance for European Integration (AEI). During the last three elections, the AEI has increased 107.7%.

Parliament elections results
Year	AEI	PCRM
2010	49.45% (13,114)	43.62% (11,570)
July 2009	48.36% (12,441)	47.72% (12,227)
April 2009	24.77% (6,312)	53.38% (13,605)

=== Elections ===
2010 Moldovan parliamentary election results (Glodeni District)
Parties and coalitions	Votes	%	+/−
Party of Communists of the Republic of Moldova	11,570	43.62	−4.10
Liberal Democratic Party of Moldova	6,540	24.66	+5.76
Democratic Party of Moldova	4,514	17,02	+3.58
Liberal Party	1,159	4.37	−4.06
Party Alliance Our Moldova	901	3.40	−4.19
Gabriel Stati (independent)	305	1.15	+1.15
European Action Movement	299	1.13	+1.13
Humanist Party of Moldova	282	1.06	+1.06
Other	1,257	3.59	-0.33
Total (turnout 57.25%)	26,743	100.00	

== Culture ==
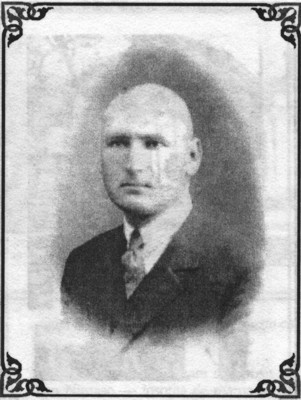
Costache Leancă

The district has a children's center, schools of art, music and fine arts, 27 cultural houses, 35 public libraries, five museums, 97 works of art and 17 musical groups.

== Health ==
Glodeni has a 200-bed hospital, 13 family practitioners, 10 health centers, 4 health offices and 26 pharmacies.

== Notable residents ==
- Aurel Saulea: Member of the Moldavian Parliament 1990–1994
- Costache Leancă: Bessarabian politician, president of Bălți County general assembly 1917–1918
- Igor Klipii: Politician and diplomat
- Vasile Coroban: Writer
