= Butești =

Buteşti may refer to several villages in Romania:

- Buteşti, a village in Horea Commune, Alba County
- Buteşti, a village in Mogoș Commune, Alba County
- Buteşti, a village in Siliştea Commune, Teleorman County

and a village in Moldova:

- Buteşti, a village in Camenca Commune, Glodeni district
