= Costache =

Costache is a Romanian male given name and surname, derived from Constantin, that may refer to:

- Costache Aristia
- Costache Caragiale
- Costache Conachi
- Costache Leancă
- Costache Negri
- Alexandru Costache
- Tamara Costache
- Valentin Costache
- Victor Costache
