= Bisericani =

Bisericani may refer to:

== Places in Romania ==
- Bisericani, a village in Bucium, Alba County
- Bisericani, a village in Lupeni, Harghita County
- Bisericani, a village in Alexandru cel Bun, Neamț County

== Places in Moldova ==
- Bisericani, a village in Cuhneşti Commune, Glodeni district
