= Valea Rusului =

Valea Rusului may refer to:

- Valea Rusului, a village in Pruteni Commune, Făleşti district, Moldova
- Valea Rusului, a village in Lupșanu Commune, Călăraşi County, Romania
