= Moara Domnească =

Moara Domnească may refer to:

- Moara Domnească, Găneasa, Ilfov, Romania
- Moara Domnească, Râfov, Prahova, Romania
- Moara Domnească, Văleni, Vaslui, Romania
- Moara Domnească, Viișoara, Glodeni, Moldova
