= Ciuciulea =

- Village
- Location within Moldova
- Coordinates: 47.66°N 27.4822222222°E
- Country: Moldova
- District: Glodeni

Government
  - Mayor: Ilie Calistru (PLDM)

Population (2014 census)
  - Total: 3,080
- Time zone: UTC+2 (EET)
  - Summer (DST): UTC+3 (EEST)

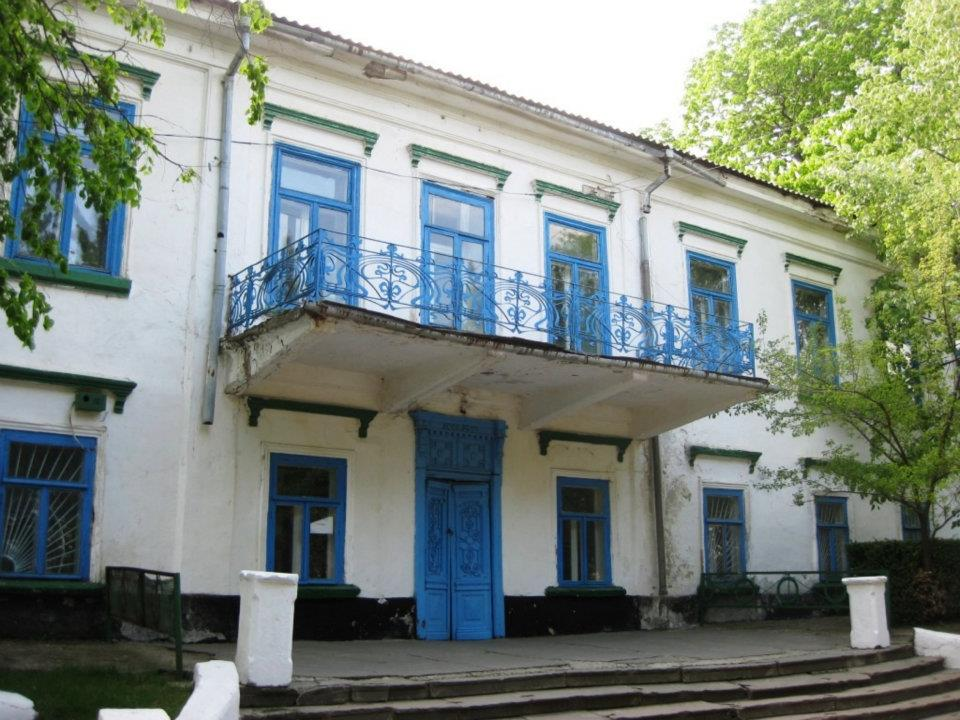
Balioz mansion in Ciuciulea, Glodeni District, Republic of Moldova

Ciuciulea is a village in Glodeni District, Moldova.
