= Iabloana =

- Commune
- Location within Moldova
- Coordinates: 47.8086111111°N 27.6219444444°E
- Country: Moldova
- District: Glodeni District

Population (2014)
  - Total: 2,263
- Time zone: UTC+2 (EET)
  - Summer (DST): UTC+3 (EEST)

Iabloana is a commune in Glodeni District, Moldova. It is composed of two villages, Iabloana and Soroca.
