= Balatina =

- Commune
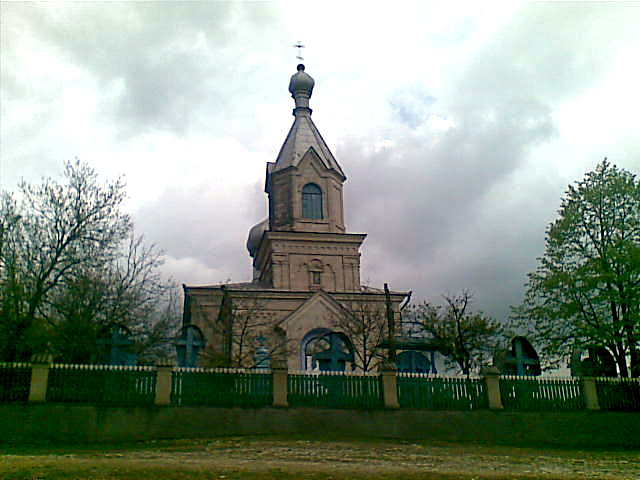

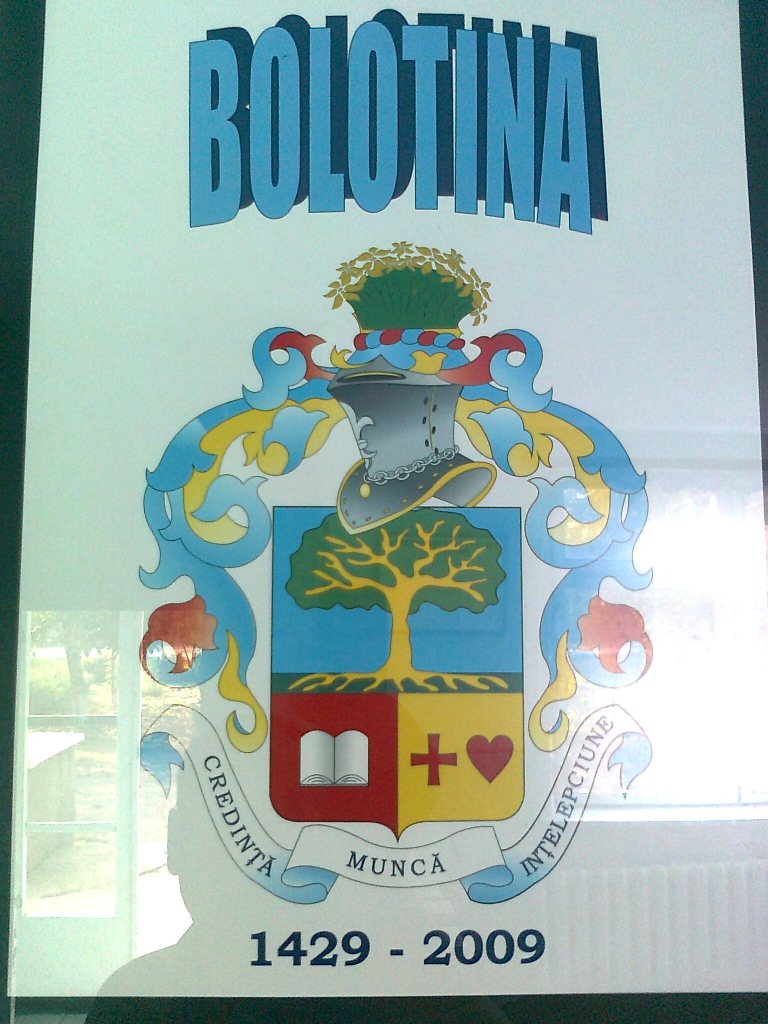
- Coat of arms

- Location in Moldova
- Coordinates: 47°42′N 27°21′E
- Country: Moldova
- District: Glodeni District
- Elevation: 272 ft (83 m)

Population (2014)
  - Total: 4,803
- Time zone: UTC+2 (EET)
  - Summer (DST): UTC+3 (EEST)
- Postal code: MD-4911
- Area code: +373 249

Balatina is a commune in Glodeni District, Moldova. It is composed of five villages: Balatina, Clococenii Vechi, Lipovăț, Tomeștii Noi and Tomeștii Vechi.

== Notable people ==
- Ala Mândâcanu

== Gallery ==
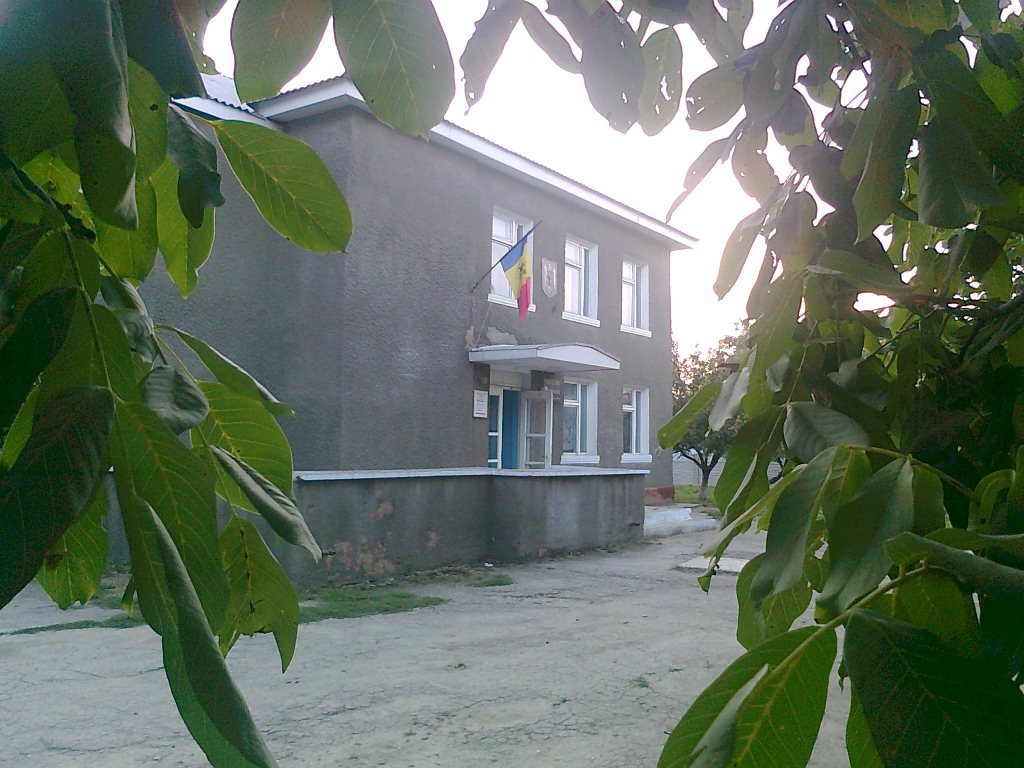
Town hall

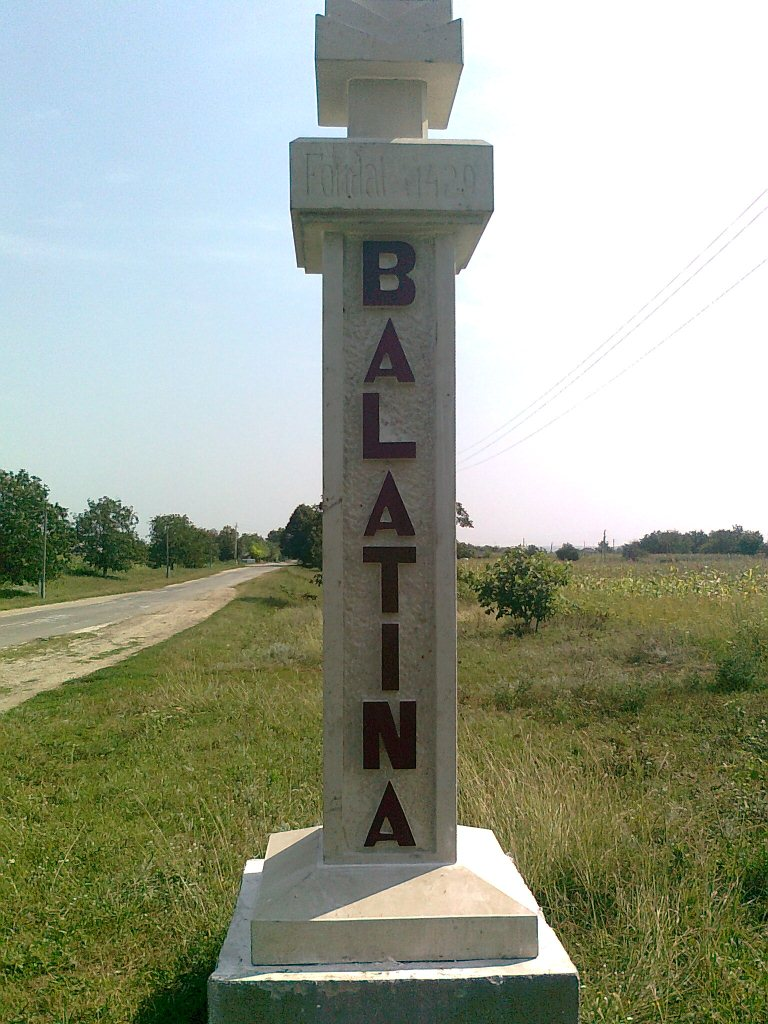

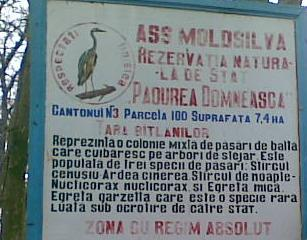
Pădurea Domnească

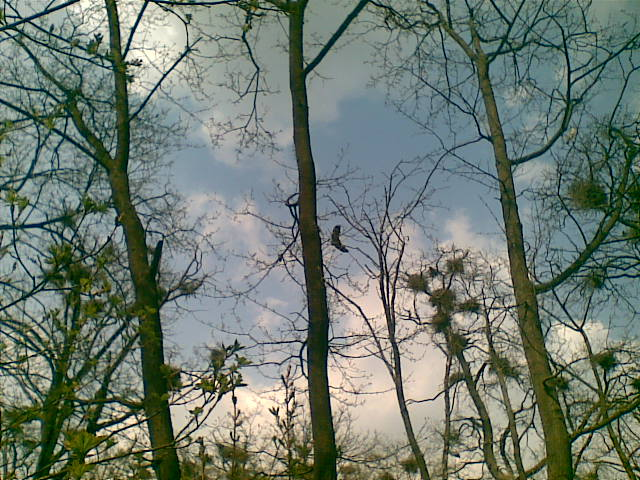
Pădurea Domnească

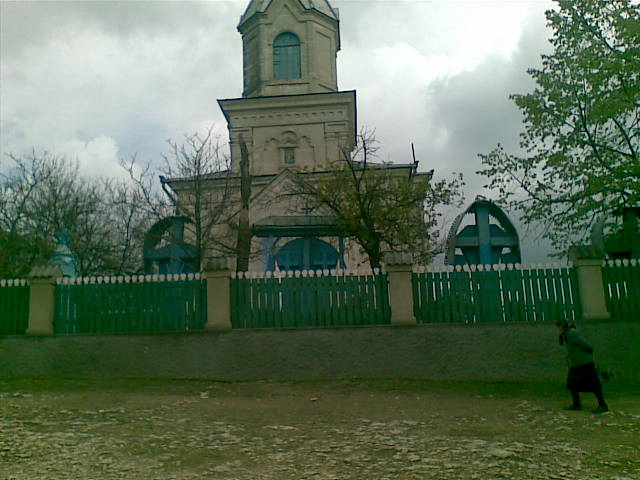

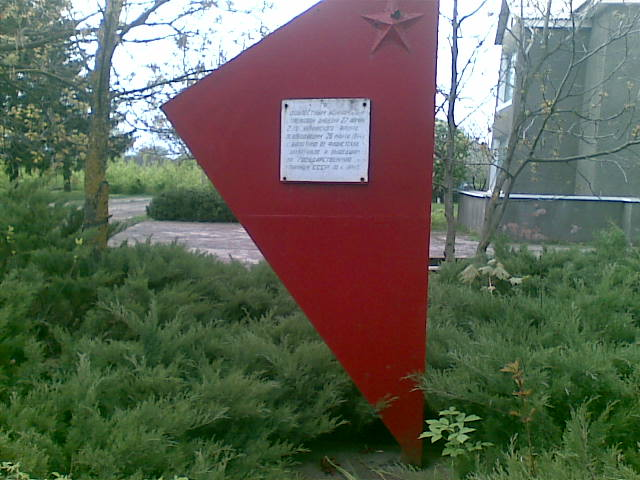
