= Pădurea Domnească =

Scientific reserve in Glodeni District, Moldova

Coordinates: 47°36′35″N 27°23′37″E

- Rezervația naturală Pădurea Domnească
- IUCN category Ia (strict nature reserve)
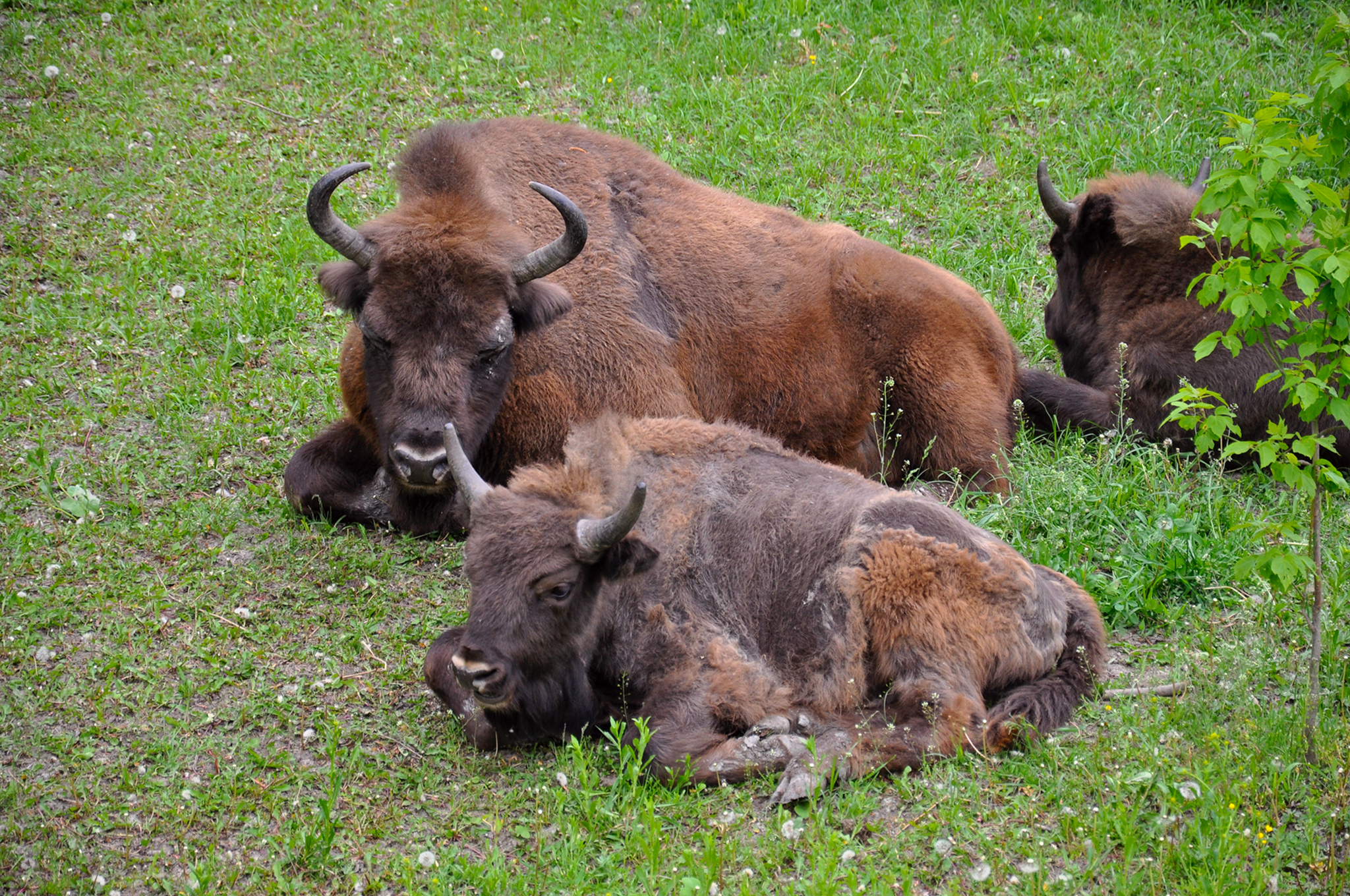
- Bisons in Pădurea Domnească

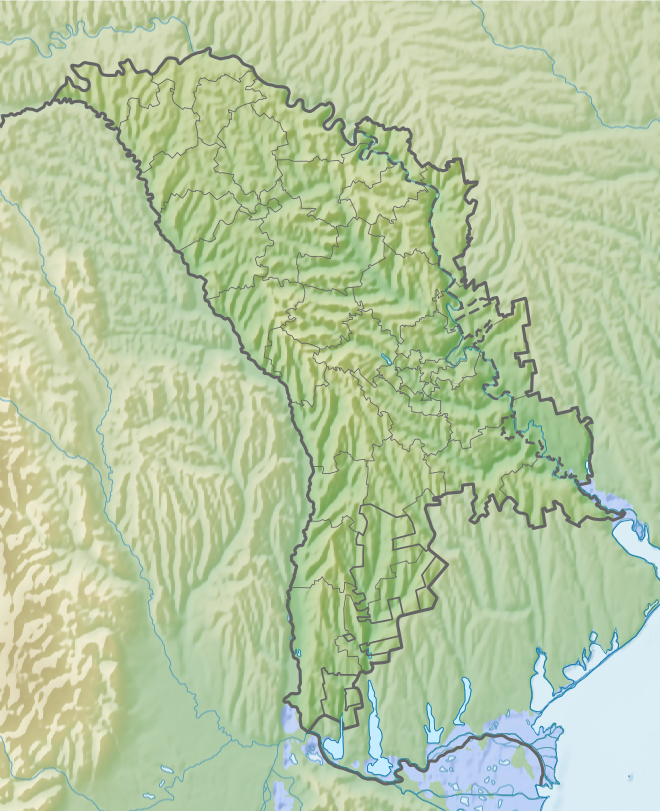
- Location within Moldova
- Location: Raionul Glodeni, Moldova
- Area: 6,032 hectares (60.32 km^{2})
- Established: 1993

The Princely Forest Nature Reserve (Romanian: Rezervația naturală Pădurea Domnească, pronunciation: [pəˈdure̯a domˈne̯askə]) is a scientific reserve in Glodeni District, Moldova, which was founded in 1993. It covers an area of 6,032 hectares, thus being, the largest scientific reserve of Moldova.

Pădurea Domnească stretches along the bank of the Prut River, next to the border of Moldova with Romania. The nearest settlement is Glodeni.

== Biodiversity ==
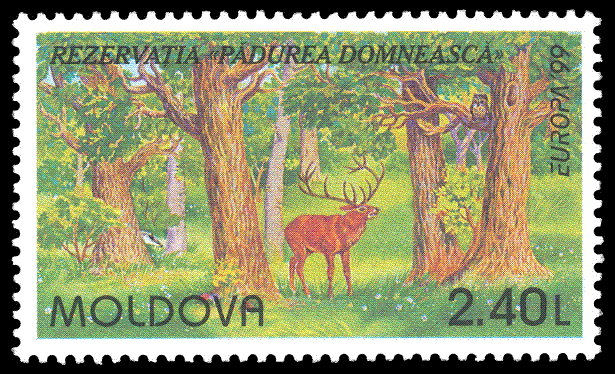
Stamp of Moldova with Pădurea Domnească

Pădurea Domnească is the only area in Moldova where European bison live. The species is classified as extinct in the country. Bison, which had previously disappeared in the territory of Moldova, were brought from the Polish Kampinos and Białowieża national parks in 2005. Then, one male and two females lived in a nursery with an area of 32 hectares. In 2018, there were already seven bison in the forest. In 2019, Moldova held negotiations with the Ministry of the Environment of Belarus on the exchange of several more animals. Belarusian state media reported that Moldova spends $25,000-30,000 on the bison program annually.

The reserve was created in order to preserve the massif of floodplain and swampy forests in the valley of the middle reaches of the River Prut, conservation of rare and endangered species of animals and plants. Pădurea Domnească is home to 49 species of mammals and more than 150 species of birds. 19 plant species with varying degrees of threat of extinction are included in the IUCN Red List. In total, around 575 plant species can be found in the reserve.

The average height above sea level is from 40 to 60 m.

== Hiking trails ==
The reserve is part of several local hiking trails that connect Pădurea Domnească and nearby natural sites.

- Landscape reserve O sută de movile (one hundred mounds), a natural landscape covered with more than 3500 mounds, springs and small lakes.
- Cheile Buteşti, a gorge located near Butești. The limestone cliffs in the gorge are more than 2 km long, 125 meters wide and up to 40 meters high.
- Stînca Mare reefs, remains of an ancient limestone coral reef (millions of years ago this area was the bottom of the sea). Located south of Koban, 1000 meters long, 100 meters wide and up to 40 meters high.
- Plots of oak groves (123 hectares), with huge oak trees about 250 years old and up to 35 m high.

== Gallery ==
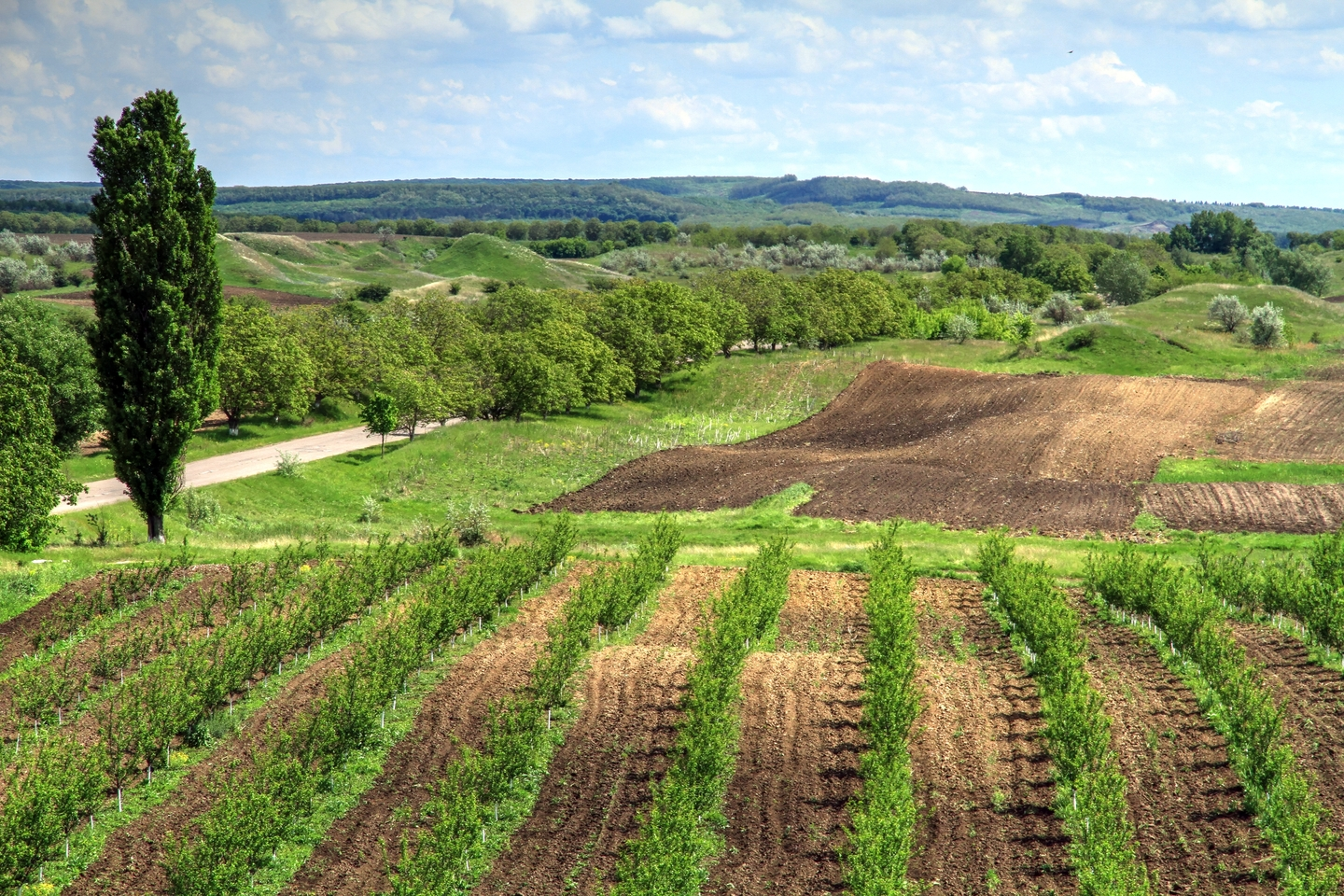
Sută de movile

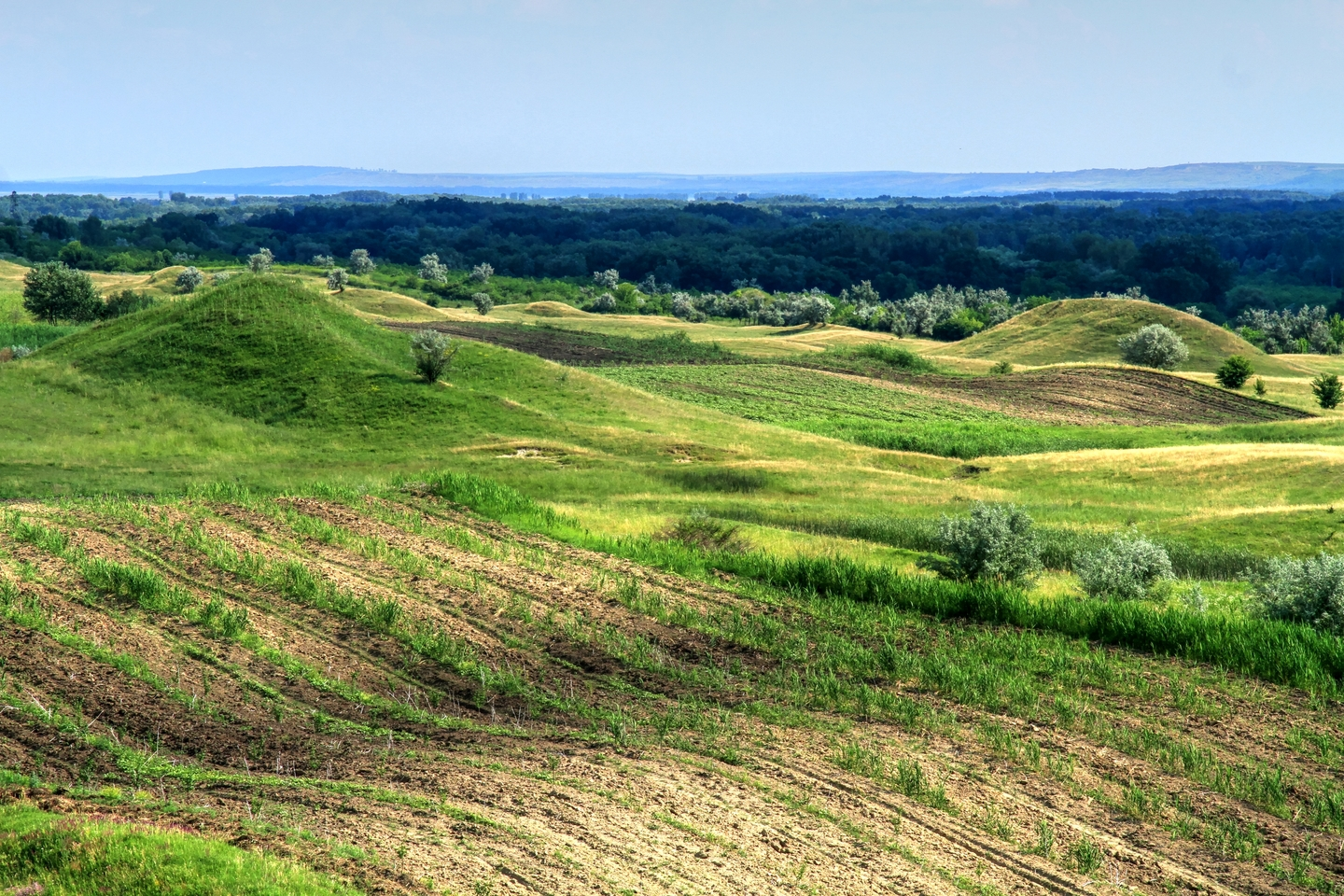
Sută de movile

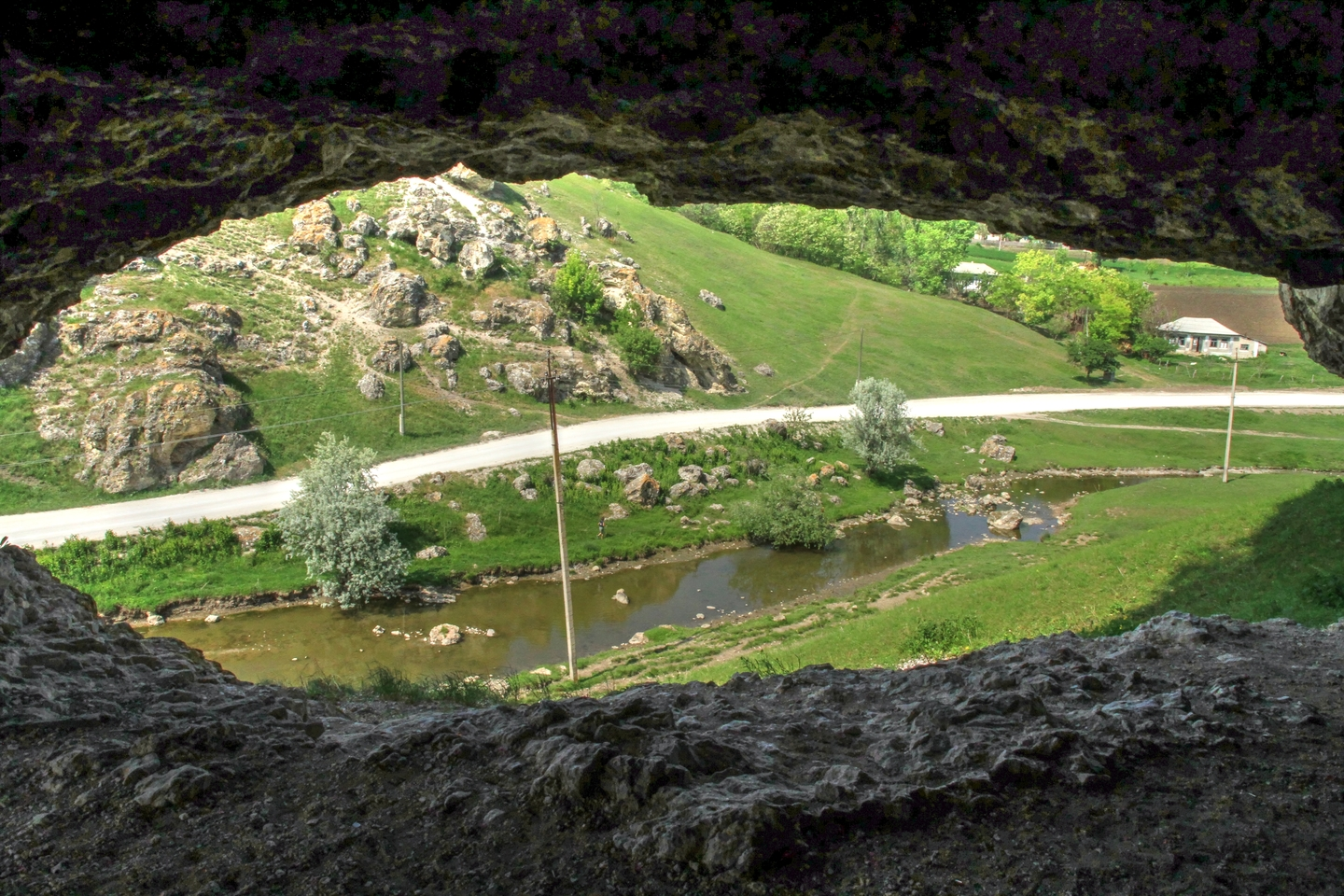
Cheile Buteşti

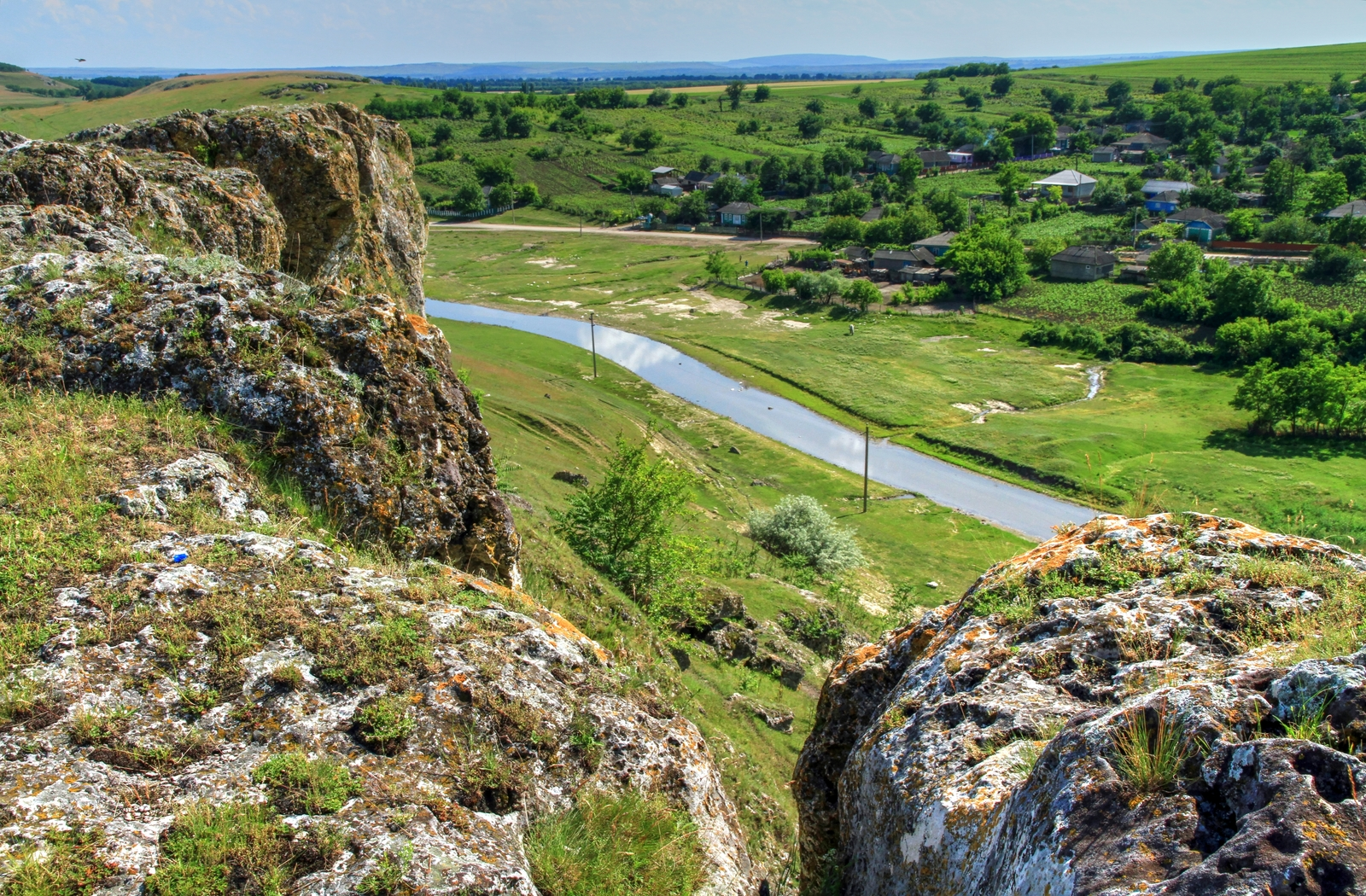
Stînca Mare

== See also ==
- Pădurea Domnească case

== Bibliography ==
- Moldovan Forest Agency: Pădurea Domnească (in Romanian)
