= Sturzovca =

- Village
- Location within Moldova
- Coordinates: 47.7988888889°N 27.7133333333°E
- Country: Moldova
- District: Glodeni

Government
  - Mayor: Oleg Colesnic (PN)

Population (2014 census)
  - Total: 4,158
- Time zone: UTC+2 (EET)
  - Summer (DST): UTC+3 (EEST)

Sturzovca is a village in Glodeni District, Moldova.
