= Costache Leancă =

Bessarabian politician (1893–1942)

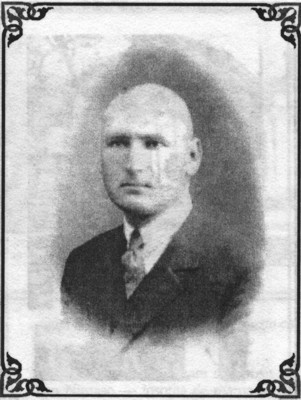

President of the general assembly of Bălți County
- In office 1917–1918

Personal details
- Born: Cuhneşti
- Died: Suhobezvodnaia, Gorki

Costache Leancă (1893, Cuhneşti - April 18, 1942, Suhobezvodnaia) was a Bessarabian politician.

== Biography ==
He served as president of the general assembly of Bălți County (1917-1918).

== Gallery ==
Moldovan stamp, 1998

== Bibliography ==
- Gheorghe E. Cojocaru, Sfatul Țării: itinerar, Civitas, Chişinău, 1998, ISBN 9975-936-20-2
- Mihai Taşcă, Sfatul Țării şi actualele autorităţi locale, "Timpul de dimineaţă", no. 114 (849), June 27, 2008 (page 16)
