= Alexăndrești =

- Commune
- Location within Moldova
- Coordinates: 47.9°N 27.4333333333°E
- Country: Moldova
- District: Rîșcani District

Government
  - Mayor: Vasili Tofilat
- Elevation: 131 m (430 ft)

Population (2014)
  - Total: 762
- Time zone: UTC+2 (EET)
  - Summer (DST): UTC+3 (EEST)

Alexăndrești is a commune situated in the Rîșcani District of Moldova. It is composed of four villages: Alexăndrești, Cucuieții Noi, Cucuieții Vechi and Ivănești.
