= Vasile Coroban =

Moldovan writer

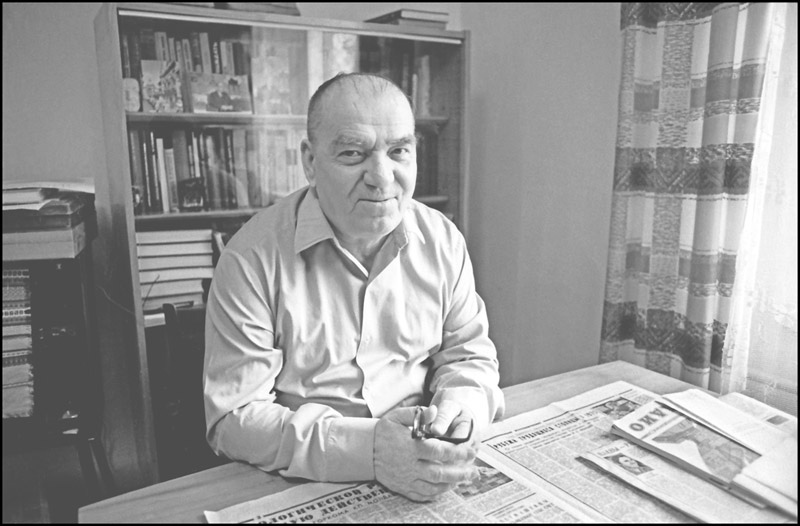
- Born: 14 February 1910; Camenca, Glodeni
- Died: 19 October 1984 (aged 74); Chişinău
- Resting place: Camenca, Glodeni
- Education: University of Iaşi

Coroban, Vasile (14 February 1910, Camenca, Glodeni – 19 October 1984, Chişinău) was a writer from Moldova. He was a non-conformist literary historian and critic from Moldavian Soviet Socialist Republic (MSSR) (nowadays Republic of Moldova), PhD in philology (1958). Beginning in 1954, he was a member of the Writers' Union of SSRM. In 1935, he graduated from the law faculty of the University of Iași. He edited the newspaper "University Life" that had an anti-fascist orientation, and because of that, he was convicted.

After 28 June 1940 he collaborated with the newspaper "Soviet Earth" from Bălți. In 1942-1945, he was a teacher at the general school in the Kemerovo region. After 1945, he worked as a secretary responsible for the newspaper "Luceafărul roșu" (Bălți). Since 1947, he collaborated with the Institute of Language and Literature of the Academy of Sciences of Moldova (ASM). Within the institute he held the position of head of the Literary Theory Sector. He was the author and editor of school textbooks in MSSR. He published research works on Romanian and Universal Classical Literature, and explored the literary phenomenon in the MSSR.

== Biography ==
He graduated from the University of Iaşi in 1935 and became a member of the Moldovan Writers' Union in 1954.

== Works ==
- Constantin Dobrogeanu-Gherea. Studiu introductiv, Ch.
- Vasile Alecsandri: viaţa şi opera, Ch., 1957
- Летописец Ион Некулче (1958)
- Scriitorii Moldovei Sovietice. Indice bibliografic, Ch., 1969 (redactor)
- Romanul moldovenesc contemporan, Ch. 1969 (original), 1974, 1979, în limba rusă
- Pagini de critică literară, Ch., 1971
- Opere alese, Ch., ed. Literatura artistică, 1983
- Dimitrie Cantemir – scriitor umanist, eseu, Ch., ed. Cartea Moldovei, 2003

== Bibliography ==
- Anatol Eremia, Unitatea patrimoniului onomastic românesc. Toponimie. Antroponimie ediţie jubiliară, 2001, Centrul Naţional de Terminologie, ed. „Iulian”, Chişinău, ISBN 9975-922-45-7.
