= Cobani =

- Village
- Location within Moldova
- Coordinates: 47.7711111111°N 27.3241666667°E
- Country: Moldova
- District: Glodeni

Government
  - Mayor: Ivan Pluta (PDM)

Population (2014 census)
  - Total: 2,255
- Time zone: UTC+2 (EET)
  - Summer (DST): UTC+3 (EEST)
- Website: https://satulcobani.wordpress.com/

Cobani is a village in Glodeni District, Moldova.

== History ==
The village is one of the oldest villages in Moldova attested in written historical records, the oldest record dating to 1374. The village (earlier known as Zubreuti) originally lay closer to the banks of the Prut river, but due to regular seasonal flooding, the locals had, by the early 18th century (ca 1702), gradually resettled the village to the current location of Cobani.
