= Călinești, Fălești =

Călinești
- Commune
- Location within Moldova
- Coordinates: 47.5633333333°N 27.4869444444°E
- Country: Moldova
- District: Fălești District

Government
  - Mayor: Ala Procopciuc (independent)

Population (2014 census)
  - Total: 2,521
- Time zone: UTC+2 (EET)
  - Summer (DST): UTC+3 (EEST)

Călinești is a commune in Fălești District, Moldova, comprising four villages: Călinești, Chetriș, Chetrișul Nou and Hîncești. It was founded on June 28, 2025, through amalgamation with other neighboring villages. Before 2025, Călinești was a self-governing village itself, as was Hîncești. Chetriș was a commune that included the villages of Chetriș and Chetrișul Nou.

Chetrișul Nou is depopulated.
