= Viișoara, Glodeni =

Viișoara
- Commune
- Location within Moldova
- Coordinates: 47.6169444444°N 27.4475°E
- Country: Moldova
- District: Glodeni District

Population (2014)
  - Total: 1,765
- Time zone: UTC+2 (EET)
  - Summer (DST): UTC+3 (EEST)

Viișoara is a commune in Glodeni District, Moldova. It is composed of two villages, Moara Domnească and Viișoara.
