= Glodeni =

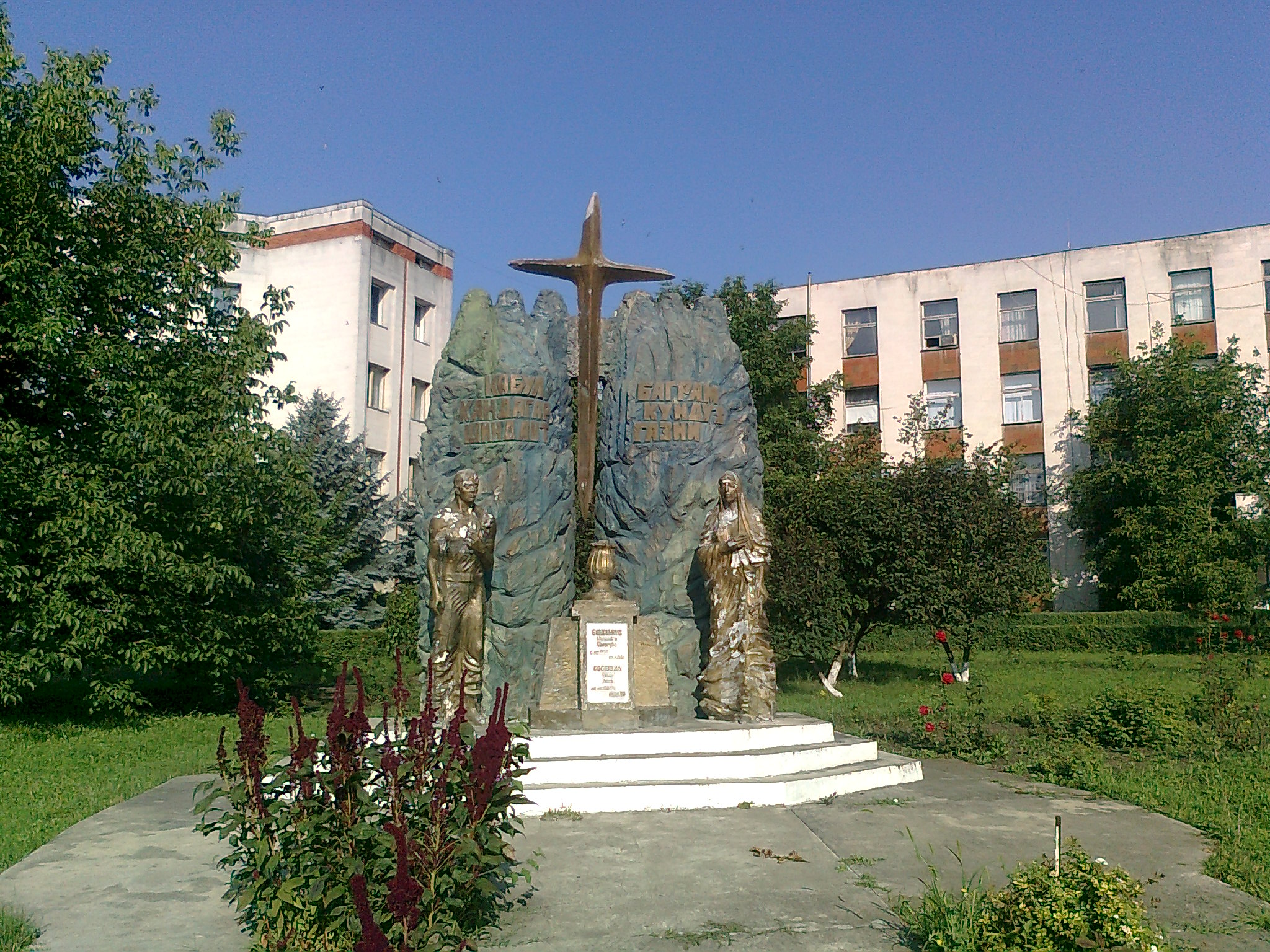

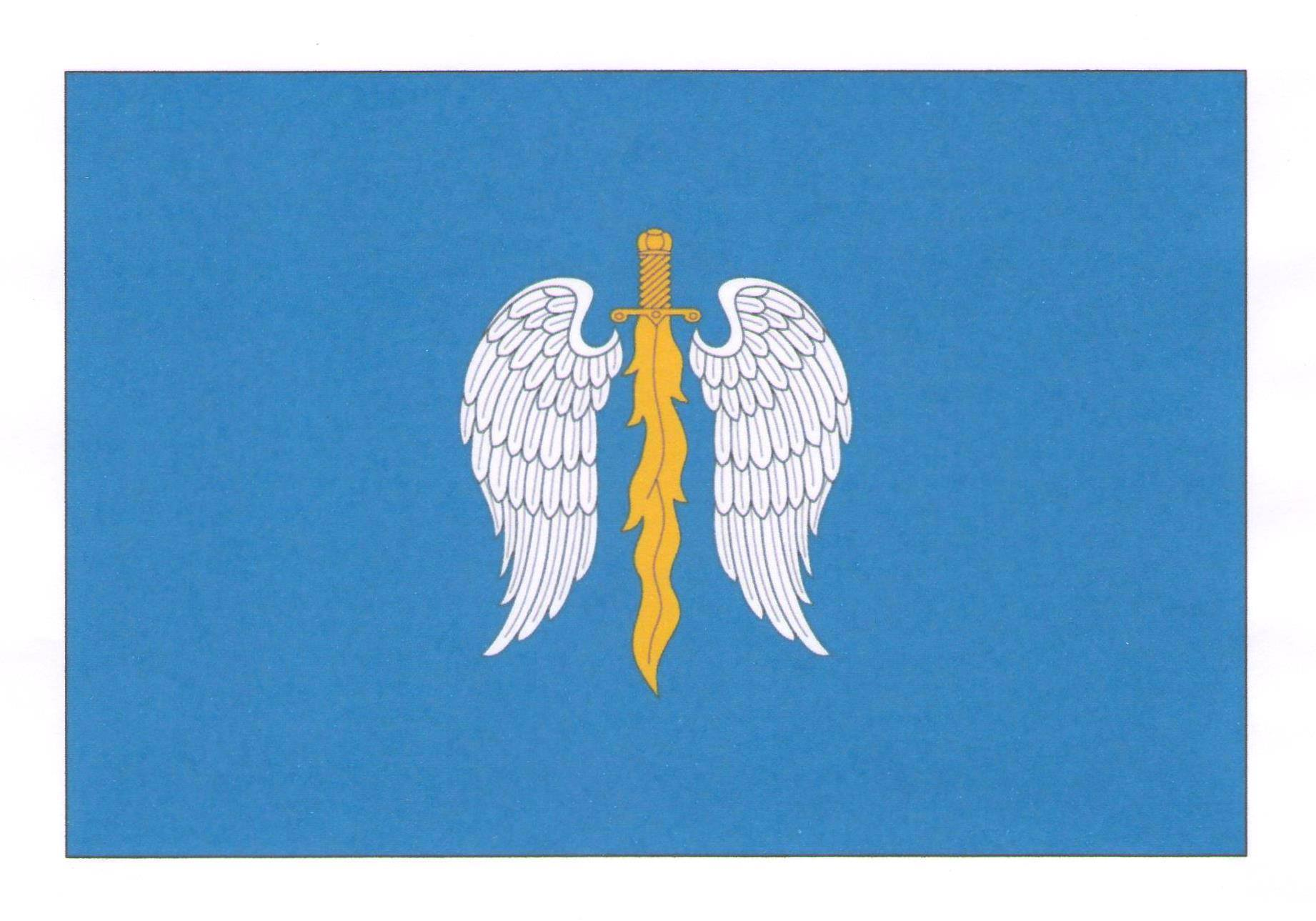
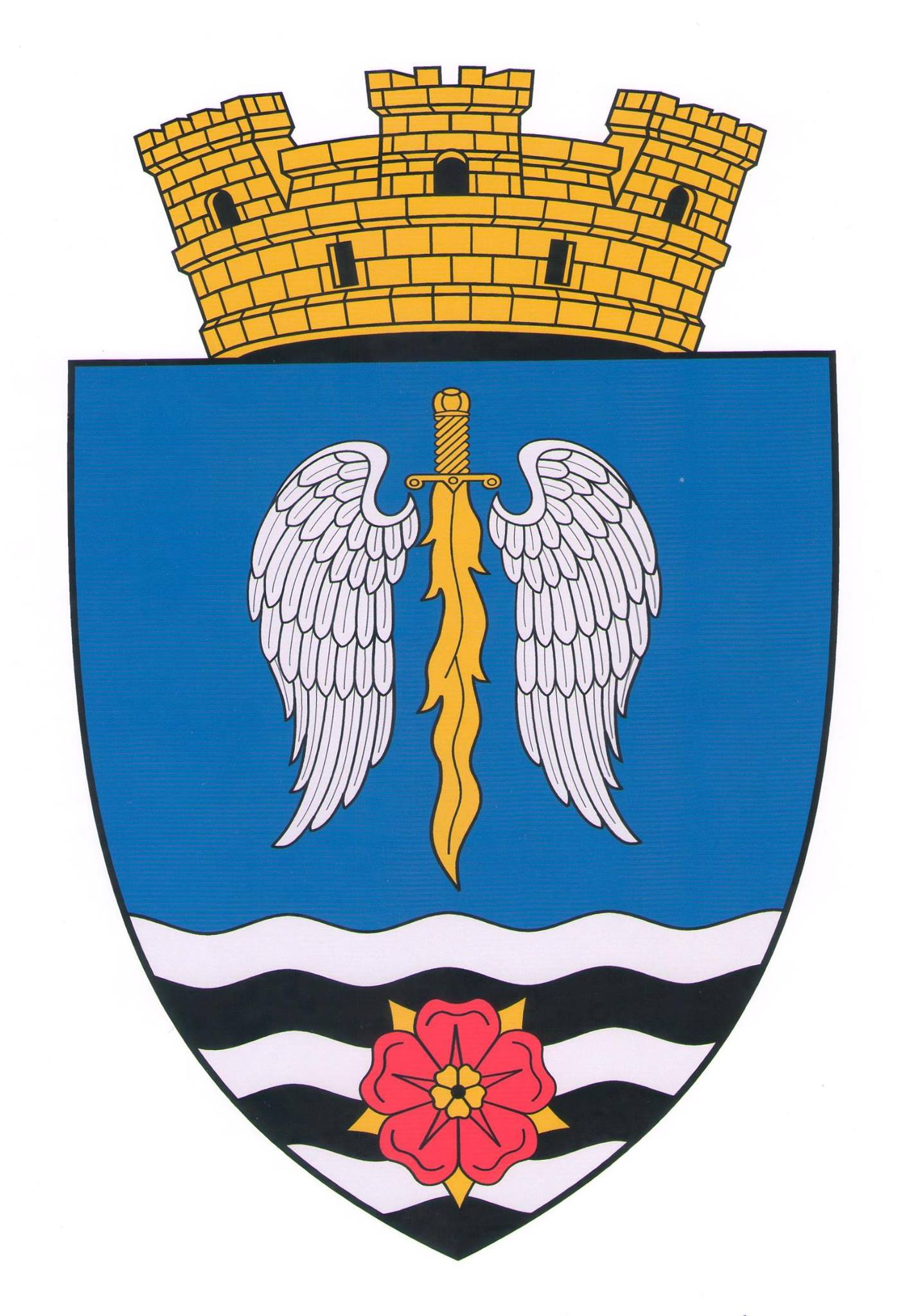
- Flag Coat of arms

- Location within Moldova
- Coordinates: 47°46′N 27°30′E
- Country: Moldova
- County: Glodeni District
- Documentary attestation: 30 June 1668

Government
  - Mayor: Stela Onuțu (PN)

Area
  - Total: 31.4 km^{2} (12.1 sq mi)

Population (2014)
  - Total: 8,676
  - Density: 276/km^{2} (716/sq mi)
- Time zone: UTC+2 (EET)
  - Summer (DST): UTC+3 (EEST)
- Postal code: MD-4900
- Area code: +373 249
- Climate: Dfb
- Website: primaria-glodeni.md

Glodeni (Romanian pronunciation: [ɡloˈdenʲ]) is a city in Moldova. It is located in the north-western part of the country, in the old Bessarabia region. It is the largest city and administrative center of Glodeni District. Spread across an area of 31.4 km^{2} (12.1 sq mi), the town had a population of 8,676 inhabitants in 2014.

== Geography ==
Glodeni is located in Glodeni District of Moldova. It is located in the southeastern Europe and in the north-western part of Moldova. Spread across an area of 31.4 km^{2} (12.1 sq mi), it is one of 18 sub-divisions (city of Glodeni and 17 communes) in the district. It is part of the Bessarabia region.

== Demographics ==
Historical population

Year	Pop.	±%
1930	2,860	—
1970	6,766	+136.6%
1979	10,366	+53.2%

Year	Pop.	±%
1989	13,180	+27.1%
2004	10,785	−18.2%
2014	8,676	−19.6%

According to the 2014 census, the population of Glodeni amounted to 8,676 inhabitants, a decrease compared to the previous census in 2004, when 10,785 inhabitants were registered. Of these, 4,037 were men and 4,639 were women. The population is further projected to reduce over the next few decades. The city had a Human Development Index of 0.699 in 2015. About 1,392 inhabitants were under the age of fourteen. About 96.7% of the population lived in urban areas. The town had an expatriate population of 555 individuals. Moldovans formed the major ethnic group (65.2%), with Ukrainians (20.4%), Russians (7.5%) and Romanians (3.9%) forming a significant minority. The town had a significant Jewish population before the Second World War. The Jews numbered almost half of the town's population. However, majority of the Jewish population were extirpated during the Holocaust and the subsequent emigration. Moldovan language was the most spoken language, spoken to by 4,096 (47.7%) inhabitants, with Russian and Romanian spoken by significant minorities.

Ethnic composition of Glodeni (2014)
1. Moldovans* (65.2%)
2. Romanians (3.87%)
3. Ukrainians (20.4%)
4. Russians (7.52%)
5. Others (3.00%)
:Linguistic composition of Glodeni (2014)
1. Moldovan* (47.6%)
2. Romanian (15.6%)
3. Russian (27.2%)
4. Ukrainian (8.61%)
5. Other (0.86%)

Footnotes:

* There is an ongoing controversy regarding the ethnic identification of Moldovans and Romanians.

* Moldovan language is one of the two local names for the Romanian language in Moldova. In 2013, the Constitutional Court of Moldova interpreted that Article 13 of the constitution is superseded by the Declaration of Independence, thus giving official status to the name Romanian.
