= Pruteni, Fălești =

Pruteni
- Commune
- Location within Moldova
- Coordinates: 47.5022222222°N 27.5477777778°E
- Country: Moldova
- District: Fălești District

Government
  - Mayor: Severin Ion

Population (2014)
  - Total: 2,140
- Time zone: UTC+2 (EET)
  - Summer (DST): UTC+3 (EEST)

Pruteni is a commune in Făleşti District, Moldova. It is composed of four villages: Cuzmenii Vechi, Drujineni, Pruteni and Valea Rusului.
