= Camenca, Glodeni =

Camenca
- Commune
- Location in Moldova
- Coordinates: 47°49′40″N 27°21′51″E
- Country: Moldova
- District: Glodeni District

Population (2014)
  - Total: 1,531
- Time zone: UTC+2 (EET)
  - Summer (DST): UTC+3 (EEST)

Camenca is a commune in Glodeni District, Moldova. It is composed of four villages: Brînzeni, Butești, Camenca and Molești.

== Notable people ==
- Vasile Coroban
