= Cuhnești =

- Commune
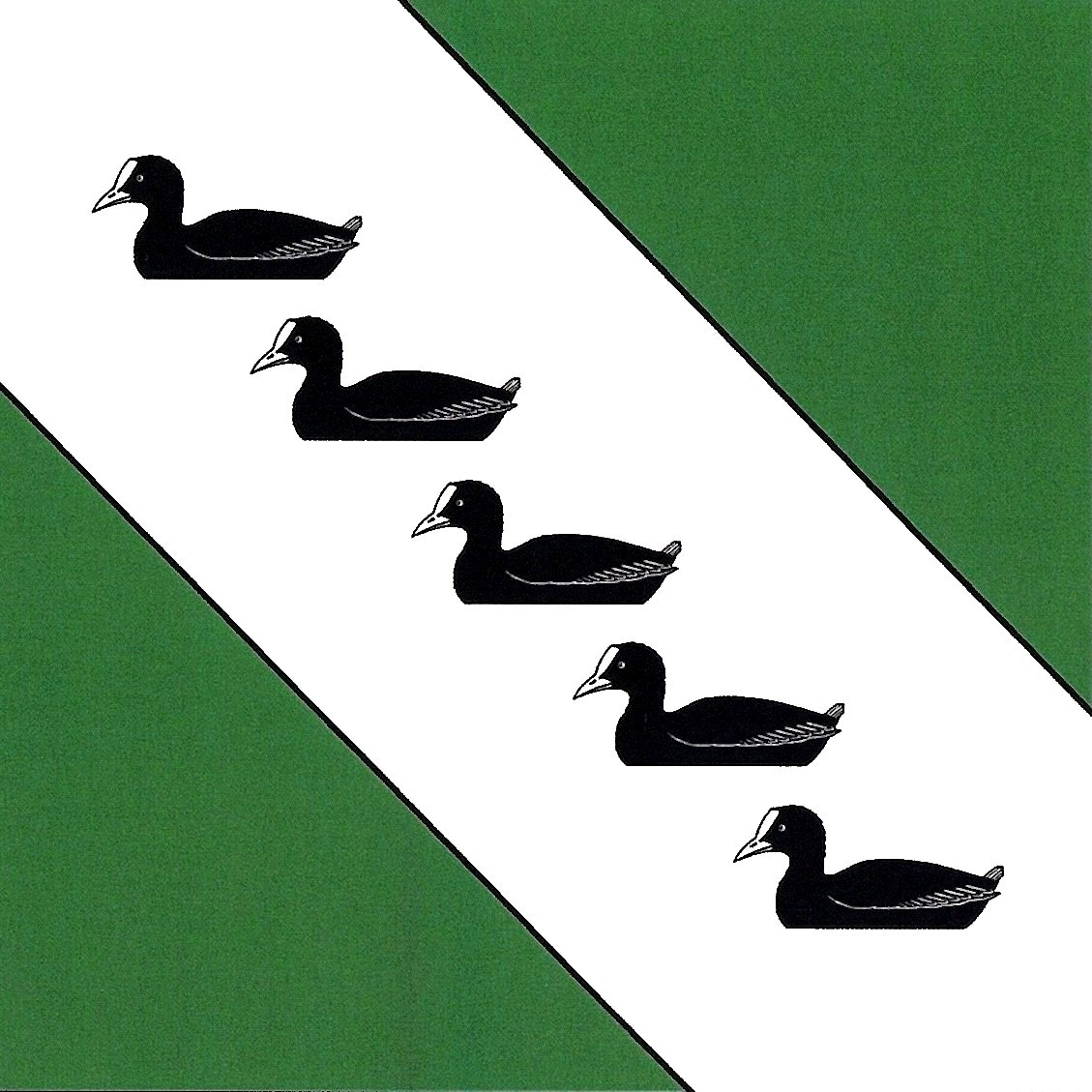
- Flag

- Location within Moldova
- Coordinates: 47.6561111111°N 27.3758333333°E
- Country: Moldova
- District: Glodeni

Population (2014)
  - Total: 2,635
- Time zone: UTC+2 (EET)
  - Summer (DST): UTC+3 (EEST)

Cuhnești is a commune in Glodeni District, Moldova. It is composed of five villages: Bisericani, Cot, Cuhnești, Movileni and Serghieni.
