= List of localities in Moldova =

Moldovan localities

There are 1682 localities in Moldova, including 66 urban localities (of them 53 are cities/towns (Romanian: orașe), and 13 municipalities (Romanian: municipiu)), and 1616 rural localities - villages (Romanian: sate). According to the Moldovan law on territorial administrative organisation, two or more villages can form together a commune (Romanian: comună).

This list is organized by district (or other first-tier administrative unit), and for each one it lists alphabetically all cities and communes. Unincorporated localities are listed under the cities and communes they belong to. The incorporated localities' territories cover the entire territory of the country.

== Municipality of Chișinău ==
There are a total of 35 localities: 7 cities/towns (further containing 2 villages within), and 12 communes (containing a further 14 villages within):

=== Cities/towns ===
Chișinău
Codru
Cricova
Durlești
Sîngera

Dobrogea
Revaca

Vadul lui Vodă
Vatra

=== Communes ===
Băcioi Brăila Frumușica Străisteni Bubuieci Bîc Humulești	Budești Văduleni Ciorescu Făurești Goian Colonița Condrița	Cruzești Ceroborta Ghidighici Grătiești Hulboaca Stăuceni Goianul Nou	Tohatin Buneți Cheltuitori Trușeni Dumbrava

== Municipality of Bălți ==
There are a total of 3 localities: 1 city, and 2 communes:

=== Cities/towns ===
Bălți

=== Communes ===
Elizaveta
Sadovoe

== Municipality of Bender (Tighina) ==
There are a total of 2 localities: 1 city, and 1 commune:

=== Cities/towns ===
Bender (Tighina)

=== Communes ===
Proteagailovca

== Anenii Noi District ==
There are a total of 45 localities: 1 city (further containing 5 villages), and 25 communes (containing a further 14 villages):

=== Cities/towns ===
Anenii Noi

Albinița
Beriozchi
Hîrbovățul Nou
Ruseni
Socoleni

=== Communes ===
Botnărești Salcia Bulboaca Calfa Calfa Nouă Chetrosu Todirești Chirca Botnăreștii Noi	Ciobanovca Balmaz Mirnoe Troița Nouă Cobusca Nouă Cobusca Veche Florești Delacău Floreni Geamăna Batîc	Gura Bîcului Hîrbovăț Maximovca Mereni Merenii Noi Ochiul Roș Picus Puhăceni Roșcani Speia Șerpeni	Telița Telița Nouă Țînțăreni Crețoaia Varnița Zolotievca Larga Nicolaevca

== Basarabeasca District ==
There are a total of 10 localities: 1 city, and 6 communes (containing a further 3 villages within):

=== Cities/towns ===
Basarabeasca

=== Communes ===
Abaclia Bașcalia Carabetovca Iordanovca	Iserlia Bogdanovca Carabiber Ivanovca Sadaclia

== Briceni District ==
There are a total of 39 localities: 2 cities, and 26 communes (containing a further 11 villages within):

=== Cities/towns ===
Briceni
Lipcani

=== Communes ===
Balasinești Bălcăuți Bocicăuți Beleavinți Berlinți Caracușenii Noi Bogdănești Bezeda Grimești Bulboaca	Caracușenii Vechi Colicăuți Trestieni Corjeuți Coteala Cotiujeni Criva Drepcăuți Grimăncăuți	Halahora de Sus Chirilovca Halahora de Jos Hlina Larga Pavlovca Marcăuți Mărcăuții Noi Medveja Slobozia-Medveja	Mihăileni Groznița Pererîta Slobozia-Șirăuți Șirăuți Tabani Tețcani Trebisăuți

== Cahul District ==
There are a total of 55 localities: 1 city (further containing 1 village), and 36 communes (containing a further 17 villages within):

=== Cities/towns ===
Cahul

Cotihana

=== Communes ===
Alexanderfeld Alexandru Ioan Cuza Andrușul de Jos Andrușul de Sus Badicul Moldovenesc Baurci-Moldoveni Borceag Brînza Bucuria Tudorești Burlacu Spicoasa Burlăceni Greceni	Chioselia Mare Frumușica Cîșlița-Prut Colibași Crihana Veche Cucoara Chircani Doina Iasnaia Poleana Rumeanțev Găvănoasa Nicolaevca Vladimirovca	Giurgiulești Huluboaia Iujnoe Larga Nouă Larga Veche Lebedenco Hutulu Ursoaia Lopățica Lucești Manta Pașcani Moscovei Trifeștii Noi	Pelinei Sătuc Roșu Slobozia Mare Taraclia de Salcie Tartaul de Salcie Tătărești Vadul lui Isac Văleni Zîrnești Paicu Tretești

== Cantemir District ==
There are a total of 51 localities: 1 city, and 26 communes (containing a further 24 villages within):

=== Cities/towns ===
Cantemir

=== Communes ===
Antonești Leca Baimaclia Acui Suhat Cania Iepureni Capaclia Chioselia Țărăncuța Ciobalaccia Flocoasa Victorovca	Cîietu Dimitrova Cîrpești Cîșla Șofranovca Cociulia Coștangalia Enichioi Bobocica Floricica Țolica Gotești Constantinești	Haragîș Lărguța Lingura Crăciun Popovca Pleșeni Hănăseni Tătărășeni Plopi Alexandrovca Hîrtop Taraclia Porumbești	Sadîc Taraclia Stoianovca Șamalia Tartaul Toceni Vîlcele Țiganca Ghioltosu Țiganca Nouă Vișniovca

== Călărași District ==
There are a total of 44 localities: 1 city (further containing 1 village), and 27 communes (containing a further 15 villages within):

=== Cities/towns ===
Călărași

Oricova

=== Communes ===
Bahmut Bahmut, loc. st. c. f. Bravicea Buda Ursari Căbăiești Dereneu Bularda Duma Frumoasa Hirova	Hîrjauca Leordoaia Mîndra Palanca Hoginești Horodiște Meleșeni Nișcani Onișcani Hîrbovăț Sverida	Păulești Peticeni Pitușca Pîrjolteni Răciula Parcani Rădeni Sadova Săseni Bahu	Sipoteni Podul Lung Temeleuți Tuzara Novaci Seliștea Nouă Țibirica Schinoasa Vălcineț Vărzăreștii Noi

== Căușeni District ==
There are a total of 48 localities: 2 cities/towns (further containing 1 village), and 28 communes (containing a further 17 villages within):

=== Cities/towns ===
Căușeni
Căinari

Căinari, loc. st. c. f.

=== Communes ===
Baccealia Tricolici Baimaclia Surchiceni Chircăiești Chircăieștii Noi Baurci Chițcani Merenești Zahorna Ciuflești Cîrnățeni	Cîrnățenii Noi Sălcuța Nouă Copanca Coșcalia Florica Plop Cremenciug Fîrlădeni Fîrlădenii Noi Gîsca	Grădinița Leuntea Valea Verde Grigorievca Hagimus Opaci Pervomaisc Constantinovca Plop-Știubei Săiți Sălcuța Taraclia	Tănătari Tănătarii Noi Ștefănești Ursoaia Nouă Tocuz Ucrainca Zviozdocica Ursoaia Zaim Marianca de Sus Zaim, loc. st. c. f.

== Cimișlia District ==
There are a total of 39 localities: 1 city (further containing 3 villages), and 22 communes (containing a further 13 villages within):

=== Cities/towns ===
Cimișlia

Bogdanovca Nouă
Bogdanovca Veche
Dimitrovca

=== Communes ===
Albina Fetița Mereni Batîr Cenac Ciucur-Mingir Codreni Zloți, loc.st.c.f. Ecaterinovca Coștangalia	Gradiște Iurievca Gura Galbenei Hîrtop Ialpug Prisaca Ialpujeni Marienfeld Ivanovca Nouă	Javgur Artimonovca Maximeni Lipoveni Munteni Schinoșica Mihailovca Porumbrei Sagaidacul Nou	Sagaidac Satul Nou Selemet Suric Topala Troițcoe Valea Perjei

== Criuleni District ==
There are a total of 43 localities: 1 city (further containing 2 villages), and 24 communes (containing a further 16 villages within):

=== Cities/towns ===
Criuleni

Ohrincea
Zolonceni

=== Communes ===
Bălăbănești Mălăiești Mălăieștii Noi Bălțata Bălțata de Sus Sagaidac Sagaidacul de Sus Boșcana Mărdăreuca Cimișeni	Corjova Coșernița Cruglic Dolinnoe Valea Coloniței Valea Satului Drăsliceni Logănești Ratuș Dubăsarii Vechi	Hîrtopul Mare Hîrtopul Mic Hrușova Chetroasa Ciopleni Ișnovăț Izbiște Jevreni Mașcăuți Măgdăcești	Miclești Stețcani Onițcani Pașcani Porumbeni Răculești Bălășești Rîșcova Slobozia-Dușca Zăicana

== Dondușeni District ==
There are a total of 30 localities: 1 city, and 21 communes (containing a further 8 villages within):

=== Cities/towns ===
Dondușeni

=== Communes ===
Arionești Baraboi Briceni Cernoleuca Climăuți Corbu Crișcăuți Dondușeni (Dondoșani) Elizavetovca (Elisabeta) Boroseni	Frasin (Frasân) Caraiman Codrenii Noi Horodiște (Horodiștea) Moșana Octeabriscoe Pivniceni Plop (Plopi) Pocrovca Rediul Mare	Scăieni (Scăienii de Sus) Sudarca Braicău Teleșeuca (Teleșăuca Veche) Teleșeuca Nouă (Teleșăuca Nouă) Tîrnova Briceva Elenovca (Elena-Doamnă) Țaul

== Drochia District ==
There are a total of 40 localities: 1 city, and 27 communes (containing a further 12 villages within):

=== Cities/towns ===
Drochia

=== Communes ===
Antoneuca (Antoneni) Baroncea Baroncea Nouă Chetrosu Cotova Măcăreuca Dominteni Drochia (Drochia sat) Fîntînița (Ghizdita) Ghizdita, loc.st.c.f. Gribova (Nădușita, Nădușița) Hăsnășenii Mari	Hăsnășenii Noi Lazo (Cuza-Vodă) Maramonovca (Moara Nouă) Miciurin (Ghica-Vodă) Mîndîc Moara de Piatră Nicoreni (Nicorești) Ochiul Alb Palanca Holoșnița Nouă Șalvirii Noi Pelinia Pelinia, loc.st.c.f	Pervomaiscoe (Căetănești) Sergheuca (Serghiești) Petreni Popeștii Noi Popeștii de Jos Popeștii de Sus Sofia Șalvirii Vechi Ceapaevca Iliciovca Șuri Șurii Noi	Țarigrad Zgurița

== Dubăsari District ==
There are a total of 15 localities: 11 communes (containing a further 4 villages within):

=== Cities/towns ===
There are no cities in this district.

=== Communes ===
Cocieri Vasilievca Corjova Mahala	Coșnița Pohrebea Doroțcaia Holercani	Marcăuți (Mărcăuți) Molovata Molovata Nouă Roghi	Oxentea (Oxintea) Pîrîta Ustia

== Edineț District ==
There are a total of 49 localities: 2 cities/towns (further containing 4 villages), and 30 communes (containing a further 13 villages within):

=== Cities/towns ===
Edineț

Alexăndreni (Alexăndrenii Noi)
Gordineștii Noi

Cupcini (Cupcina)

Chetroșica Veche
Chiurt

=== Communes ===
Alexeevca (Alexeni) Bădragii Noi Bădragii Vechi Bleșteni Volodeni Brătușeni Brătușenii Noi Brînzeni Burlănești Buzdugeni Cepeleuți Rîngaci Vancicăuți (Vancicăuții Mici) Chetroșica Nouă	Constantinovca (Constantinești) Iachimeni Corpaci Cuconeștii Noi Cuconeștii Vechi Fetești Gașpar Goleni Gordinești Hancăuți (Hâncăuți) Hincăuți (Chincăuți) Clișcăuți Poiana Hlinaia (Glina-Mare)	Lopatnic Parcova Fîntîna Albă Rotunda Hlinaia Mică (Glina Mică) Ruseni Slobodca (Slobozia) Stolniceni Șofrîncani Terebna Tîrnova Trinca Viișoara Zăbriceni Onești (Porciuleanca)

== Fălești District ==
There are a total of 76 localities: 1 city (further containing 1 village), and 32 communes (containing a further 42 villages within):

=== Cities/towns ===
Fălești

Fabrica de Zahăr

=== Communes ===
Albinețul Vechi Albinețul Nou Rediul de Jos Rediul de Sus Bocani Catranîc Călinești Chetriș Chetrișul Nou Hîncești Călugăr Frumușica Socii Noi Socii Vechi Ciolacu Nou Ciolacu Vechi Făgădău Pocrovca Șoltoaia	Egorovca Catranîc, loc.st.c.f. Ciuluc Făleștii Noi Pietrosul Nou Glinjeni Hiliuți Răuțelul Nou Horești Lucăceni Unteni Ilenuța Ișcălău Burghelea Doltu Izvoare Logofteni Moldoveanca	Mărăndeni Musteața Natalievca Beleuți Comarovca Ivanovca Popovca Țapoc Năvîrneț Obreja Veche Obreja Nouă Pietrosu Măgura Măgura Nouă Pînzăreni Pînzărenii Noi Pîrlița Pompa Pervomaisc Suvorovca	Pruteni Cozmenii Vechi Drujineni Valea Rusului Răuțel Risipeni Bocșa Sărata Veche Hitrești Sărata Nouă Scumpia Hîrtop Măgureanca Nicolaevca Taxobeni Hrubna Nouă Vrănești

== Florești District ==
There are a total of 74 localities: 3 cities, and 37 communes (containing a further 34 villages within):

=== Cities/towns ===
Florești
Ghindești
Mărculești

=== Communes ===
Alexeevca Chirilovca Dumitreni Rădulenii Noi Băhrinești Cașunca Cernița Ciripcău Ciutulești Ion Vodă Mărinești Sîrbești Coșernița Cuhureștii de Jos Țipordei Cuhureștii de Sus Nicolaevca Unchitești Unchitești, loc.st.c.f.	Cunicea Domulgeni Frumușica Frumușica Nouă Ghindești Hîrtop Țîra Țîra, loc.st.c.f. Gura Camencii Bobulești Gvozdova Gura Căinarului Zarojeni Iliciovca Maiscoe Izvoare Bezeni Scăieni	Japca Bursuc Lunga Mărculești Năpadova Nicolaevca Valea Rădoaiei Prajila Antonovca Frunzești Mihailovca Prodănești Căprești Putinești Rădulenii Vechi Roșietici Cenușa Roșieticii Vechi	Sănătăuca Sevirova Ivanovca Ștefănești Prodăneștii Vechi Temeleuți Tîrgul Vertiujeni Trifănești Alexandrovca Vărvăreuca Stîrceni Văscăuți Făgădău Octeabriscoe Vertiujeni Zăluceni

== Glodeni District ==
There are a total of 35 localities: 1 city (further containing 1 village), and 18 communes (containing a further 15 villages within):

=== Cities/towns ===
Glodeni

Stîrcea

=== Communes ===
Balatina Clococenii Vechi Lipovăț Tomeștii Noi Tomeștii Vechi Cajba Camenca Brînzeni Butești Molești Ciuciulea	Cobani Cuhnești Bisericani Cot Movileni Serghieni Danu Camencuța Nicolaevca Dușmani Fundurii Noi	Fundurii Vechi Hîjdieni Iabloana Soroca Limbenii Noi Limbenii Vechi Petrunea Sturzovca Ustia Viișoara Moara Domnească

== Hîncești District ==
There are a total of 63 localities: 1 city, and 38 communes (containing a further 24 villages within):

=== Cities/towns ===
Hîncești

=== Communes ===
Bălceana Bobeica Dahnovici Drăgușeni Boghiceni Bozieni Dubovca Bujor Buțeni Caracui Călmățui Cărpineni Horjești Cățeleni Cioara Ciuciuleni	Cotul Morii Sărăteni Crasnoarmeiscoe Tălăiești Dancu Drăgușenii Noi Horodca Fîrlădeni Fundul Galbenei Ivanovca Costești Frasin Lăpușna Anini Rusca	Leușeni Feteasca Logănești Mereșeni Sărata-Mereșeni Mingir Semionovca Mirești Chetroșeni Negrea Nemțeni Obileni Onești Stîmbeni Pașcani Pereni	Pervomaiscoe Pogănești Marchet Sărata-Galbenă Brătianovca Cărpineanca Coroliovca Valea Florii Secăreni Cornești Secărenii Noi Sofia Stolniceni Șipoteni Voinescu

== Ialoveni District ==
There are a total of 34 localities: 1 city, and 24 communes (containing a further 9 villages within):

=== Cities/towns ===
Ialoveni

=== Communes ===
Bardar Cărbuna Cigîrleni Costești Dănceni Gangura Alexandrovca Homuteanovca Misovca	Hansca Horești Horodca Malcoci Mileștii Mici Piatra Albă Molești Nimoreni Pojăreni	Puhoi Răzeni Mileștii Noi Ruseștii Noi Ruseștii Vechi Sociteni Suruceni	Țipala Bălțați Budăi Ulmu Văratic Văsieni Zîmbreni Găureni

== Leova District ==
There are a total of 39 localities: 2 cities/towns (further containing 1 village), and 23 communes (containing a further 13 villages within):

=== Cities/towns ===
Leova
Iargara

Meșeni

=== Communes ===
Băiuș Cociulia Nouă Hîrtop Beștemac Pitești Borogani Cazangic Frumușica Seliște	Ceadîr Cneazevca Cîzlar Colibabovca Covurlui Cupcui Filipeni Hănăsenii Noi Nicolaevca	Orac Romanovca Sărata Nouă Bulgărica Sărata-Răzeși Sărăteni Victoria Sărățica Nouă Cîmpul Drept Sîrma	Tigheci Cuporani Tochile-Răducani Tomai Tomaiul Nou Sărățica Veche Vozneseni Troian Troița

== Nisporeni District ==
There are a total of 39 localities: 1 city, and 22 communes (containing a further 16 villages within):

=== Cities/towns ===
Nisporeni

=== Communes ===
Mileștii Mari Bălănești Găureni Bălăurești Bărboieni Boldurești Băcșeni Chilișoaia Bolțun Brătuleni Cîrnești	Bursuc Călimănești Ciorești Vulcănești Ciutești Valea Nîrnovei Cristești Grozești Iurceni Mîrzoaia	Marinici Heleșteni Milești Seliște Păruceni Soltănești Șișcani Drojdieni Odaia	Valea-Trestieni Isăicani Luminița Odobești Selișteni Vărzărești Șendreni Vînători Zberoaia

== Ocnița District ==
There are a total of 33 localities: 3 cities, and 18 communes (containing a further 12 villages within):

=== Cities/towns ===
Ocnița
Frunză
Otaci

=== Communes ===
Bîrlădeni Paladea Rujnița Bîrnova Calarașovca Berezovca Clocușna	Corestăuți Stălinești Dîngeni Grinăuți Gîrbova Grinăuți-Moldova Grinăuți-Raia Rediul Mare	Hădărăuți Lencăuți Verejeni Lipnic Paustova Mereșeuca Mihălășeni Grinăuți	Naslavcea Ocnița Maiovca Sauca Unguri Vălcineț Codreni

== Orhei District ==
There are a total of 75 localities: 1 city, and 37 communes (containing a further 37 villages within):

=== Cities/towns ===
Orhei

=== Communes ===
Berezlogi Hîjdieni Biești Cihoreni Slobozia-Hodorogea Bolohan Brăviceni Bulăiești Chiperceni Andreevca Voroteț Ciocîlteni Clișova Nouă Fedoreuca Clișova Crihana Cucuruzenii de Sus Sirota Cucuruzeni Ocnița-Răzeși	Donici Camencea Pocșești Ghetlova Hulboaca Noroceni Isacova Ivancea Brănești Furceni Jora de Mijloc Jora de Jos Jora de Sus Lopatna Mălăiești Tîrzieni Mitoc Mîrzești Mîrzaci	Morozeni Breanova Neculăieuca Pelivan Cișmea Peresecina Piatra Jeloboc Podgoreni Pohorniceni Pohrebeni Izvoare Șercani Puțintei Dișcova Vîprova Sămănanca Seliște Lucășeuca Mana	Step-Soci Budăi Susleni Teleșeu Trebujeni Butuceni Morovaia Vatici Curchi Tabăra Vîșcăuți Zahoreni Zorile Inculeț Ocnița-Țărani

== Rezina District ==
There are a total of 41 localities: 1 city (further containing 3 villages), and 24 communes (containing a further 13 villages within):

=== Cities/towns ===
Rezina

Boșernița
Ciorna
Stohnaia

=== Communes ===
Bușăuca Cinișeuți Cogîlniceni Cuizăuca Echimăuți Ghiduleni Roșcanii de Jos Roșcanii de Sus Gordinești	Horodiște Slobozia-Horodiște Ignăței Lalova Nistreni Țîpova Lipceni Mateuți Meșeni	Mincenii de Jos Mincenii de Sus Otac Păpăuți Peciște Pereni Roșcani Pripiceni-Răzeși Pripiceni-Curchi	Saharna Nouă Buciușca Saharna Sîrcova Piscărești Solonceni Tarasova Trifești Țareuca Țahnăuți

== Rîșcani District ==
There are a total of 55 localities: 2 cities/towns (further containing 6 villages), and 26 communes (containing a further 21 villages within):

=== Cities/towns ===
Rîșcani

Balanul Nou
Rămăzan

Costești

Dămășcani
Duruitoarea
Păscăuți
Proscureni

=== Communes ===
Alexăndrești Cucuieții Noi Cucuieții Vechi Ivănești Aluniș Borosenii Noi Braniște Avrămeni Reteni Reteni-Vasileuți Corlăteni	Duruitoarea Nouă Dumeni Gălășeni Mălăiești Grinăuți Ciobanovca Hiliuți Horodiște Malinovscoe Lupăria Mihăileni Nihoreni	Petrușeni Pîrjota Pociumbăuți Pociumbeni Druța Răcăria Ușurei Recea Slobozia-Recea Sverdiac Singureni Sturzeni	Șaptebani Șumna Bulhac Cepăria Vasileuți Armanca Ciubara Mihăilenii Noi Moșeni Știubeieni Văratic Zăicani

== Sîngerei District ==
There are a total of 70 localities: 2 cities/towns (further containing 1 village), and 24 communes (containing a further 43 villages within):

=== Cities/towns ===
Sîngerei

Vrănești

Biruința

=== Communes ===
Alexăndreni Grigorești Heciul Vechi Țiplești Țipletești Bălășești Sloveanca Bilicenii Noi Lipovanca Mîndreștii Noi Bilicenii Vechi Coada Iazului Bursuceni Slobozia-Măgura Chișcăreni Nicolaevca Slobozia-Chișcăreni	Ciuciuieni Brejeni Copăceni Antonovca Evghenievca Gavrilovca Petrovca Vladimireuca Coșcodeni Bobletici Flămînzeni Cotiujenii Mici Alexeuca Gura-Oituz Cubolta Mărășești Dobrogea Veche Cotovca Dobrogea Nouă	Drăgănești Chirileni Sacarovca Dumbrăvița Bocancea-Schit Valea lui Vlad Grigorăuca Cozești Petropavlovca Heciul Nou Trifănești Iezărenii Vechi Iezărenii Noi Izvoare Valea Norocului	Pepeni Pepenii Noi Răzălăi Romanovca Prepelița Clișcăuți Mihailovca Șestaci Rădoaia Sîngereii Noi Mărinești Tăura Veche Tăura Nouă Țambula Octeabriscoe Pălăria

== Soroca District ==
There are a total of 68 localities: 1 city, and 34 communes (containing a further 33 villages within):

=== Cities/towns ===
Soroca

=== Communes ===
Bădiceni Grigorăuca Băxani Bulboci Bulbocii Noi Căinarii Vechi Floriceni Cosăuți Iorjnița Cremenciug Livezi Sobari Valea Dărcăuți Dărcăuții Noi Mălcăuți Dubna Egoreni	Holoșnița Cureșnița Hristici Iarova Balinți Balinții Noi Nimereuca Cerlina Oclanda Ocolina Țepilova Parcani Voloave Pîrlița Vanțina Vanțina Mică Racovăț Redi-Cereșnovăț	Regina Maria Lugovoe Rublenița Rublenița Nouă Rudi Schineni Schinenii Noi Stoicani Soloneț Șeptelici Șolcani Cureșnița Nouă Tătărăuca Veche Decebal Niorcani Slobozia Nouă Tătărăuca Nouă Tolocănești	Trifăuți Vasilcău Inundeni Ruslanovca Vădeni Dumbrăveni Vărăncău Slobozia-Cremene Slobozia-Vărăncău Visoca Volovița Alexandru cel Bun Zastînca

== Strășeni District ==
There are a total of 39 localities: 2 cities/towns (further containing 2 village), and 25 communes (containing a further 10 villages within):

=== Cities/towns ===
Strășeni

Făgureni

Bucovăț

Rassvet

=== Communes ===
Căpriana Chirianca Codreanca Lupa-Recea Cojușna Dolna Gălești Găleștii Noi Ghelăuza Saca	Greblești Mărtinești Lozova Stejăreni Micăuți Gornoe Micleușeni Huzun Negrești	Onești Pănășești Ciobanca Rădeni Drăgușeni Zamcioji Recea Romănești Roșcani Scoreni	Sireți Tătărești Țigănești Voinova Vorniceni Zubrești

== Șoldănești District ==
There are a total of 33 localities: 1 city, and 22 communes (containing a further 10 villages within):

=== Cities/towns ===
Șoldănești

=== Communes ===
Alcedar Curătura Odaia Chipeșca Climăuții de Jos Cot Cobîlea Cotiujenii Mari Cobîlea, loc. st. c. f. Cușelăuca Cușmirca	Dobrușa Recești Zahorna Fuzăuca Găuzeni Glinjeni Mihuleni Olișcani Parcani Pohoarna Poiana	Răspopeni Rogojeni Rogojeni, loc. st. c. f. Salcia Lelina Sămășcani Șestaci Șipca Vadul-Rașcov Socola

== Ștefan Vodă District ==
There are a total of 26 localities: 1 city, and 22 communes (containing a further 3 villages within):

=== Cities/towns ===
Ștefan Vodă

=== Communes ===
Alava Lazo Antonești Brezoaia Carahasani Căplani Coiburciu Copceac Crocmaz	Ermoclia Feștelița Marianca de Jos Olănești Palanca Popeasca Purcari Viișoara	Răscăieți Răscăieții Noi Semionovca Slobozia Ștefănești Talmaza Tudora Volintiri

== Taraclia District ==
There are a total of 26 localities: 2 cities, and 13 communes (containing a further 11 villages within):

=== Cities/towns ===
Taraclia
Tvardița

=== Communes ===
Albota de Jos Hagichioi Hîrtop Albota de Sus Roșița Sofievca Aluatu Balabanu	Budăi Dermengi Cairaclia Cealîc Cortenul Nou Samurza Corten Musaitu	Novosiolovca Salcia Orehovca Valea Perjei Vinogradovca Chirilovca Ciumai Mirnoe

== Telenești District ==
There are a total of 54 localities: 1 city (further containing 2 villages), and 30 communes (containing a further 21 villages within):

=== Cities/towns ===
Telenești

Mihălașa
Mihălașa Nouă

=== Communes ===
Bănești Băneștii Noi Bogzești Brînzenii Noi Brînzenii Vechi Budăi Căzănești Vadul-Leca Vadul-Leca Nou Chiștelnița Chițcanii Vechi Chițcanii Noi Ciulucani	Cîșla Codrul Nou Coropceni Crăsnășeni Ghiliceni Cucioaia Cucioaia Nouă Hirișeni Inești Leușeni Mîndrești Codru	Negureni Chersac Dobrușa Nucăreni Ordășei Pistruieni Hîrtop Pistruienii Noi Ratuș Mîndra Sărătenii Noi Zăicani Zăicanii Noi	Sărătenii Vechi Zahareuca Scorțeni Suhuluceni Ghermănești Tîrșiței Flutura Țînțăreni Văsieni Verejeni Zgărdești Bondareuca Ciofu

== Ungheni District ==
There are a total of 74 localities: 2 cities/towns (further containing 1 village), and 31 communes (containing a further 40 villages within):

=== Cities/towns ===
Ungheni
Cornești

Romanovca

=== Communes ===
Agronomovca Negurenii Noi Zăzulenii Noi Alexeevca Lidovca Săghieni Boghenii Noi Boghenii Vechi Izvoreni Mircești Poiana Buciumeni Buciumeni, loc. st. c. f. Florești Bumbăta Bușila Cetireni Chirileni	Cioropcani Bulhac Stolniceni Condrătești Curtoaia Cornești Cornova Costuleni Florițoaia Veche Florițoaia Nouă Grozasca Hîrcești Drujba Leordoaia Mînzătești Veverița Măcărești Frăsinești	Măgurele Mănoilești Novaia Nicolaevca Rezina Vulpești Morenii Noi Șicovăț Năpădeni Negurenii Vechi Coșeni Țîghira Zăzulenii Vechi Petrești Medeleni Petrești, loc. st. c. f. Pîrlița Hristoforovca Rădenii Vechi	Sculeni Blindești Floreni Gherman Sinești Pojarna Teșcureni Todirești Grăseni Unțești Valea Mare Buzduganii de Jos Buzduganii de Sus Morenii Vechi Zagarancea Elizavetovca Semeni

== Găgăuzia ==
There are a total of 32 localities: 3 cities/towns (further containing 1 village within), and 23 communes (containing a further 5 villages within):

=== Cities/towns ===
Comrat
Ceadîr-Lunga
Vulcănești

Vulcănești, loc. st. c. f.

=== Communes ===
Avdarma Baurci Beșalma Beșghioz (Beş-Ghioz) Bugeac Carbalia Cazaclia Chioselia Rusă (Chioselia Mică) Chiriet-Lunga Chirsova	Cioc-Maidan Cișmichioi (Cişmechioi) Congaz Congazcicul de Sus (Congazul-Mic) Congazcicul de Jos Dudulești Copceac (Tatar-Copceac) Cotovscoe (Cârlăneni) Dezghingea (Dezghinge)	Etulia Etulia Nouă Etulia, loc. st. c. f. Ferapontievca (Feraponteanca) Gaidar (Gaidari) Joltai (Djoltai) Svetlîi (Denevița) Alexeevca (Alexeeni) Tomai

== Left Bank of the Dniester ==
According to the Moldovan law on territorial administrative organisation, on the Left Bank of the Dniester (today mostly in control of the unrecognized breakaway state of Transnistria), there are a total of 147 localities: 10 cities/towns (further containing 2 villages within), and 69 communes (containing a further 66 villages within):

=== Cities/towns ===
Camenca Solnecinoe Crasnoe Dnestrovsc	Dubăsari Grigoriopol Crasnoe Maiac	Rîbnița Slobozia Tiraspol Tiraspolul Nou

=== Communes ===
Andreevca Pîcalova Șmalena Beloci Bîcioc Novovladimirovca Blijnii Hutor Broșteni Butor India Butuceni Caragaș Caterinovca Sadchi Carmanova Cotovca Fedoseevca Mocearovca Cioburciu Cobasna Suhaia Rîbnița Cobasna, loc. st. c. f. Colosova Crasnaia Besarabia Pobeda Comisarovca Nouă Bosca Coșnița Nouă Pohrebea Nouă Corotna Crasnencoe Dimitrova Ivanovca Crasnîi Octeabri Alexandrovca	Crasnîi Vinogradari Afanasievca Alexandrovca Nouă Calinovca Lunga Nouă Crasnogorca Cuzmin Voitovca Delacău Crasnaia Gorca Doibani I Doibani II Coicova Dubău Goianul Nou Dzerjinscoe Frunză Andriașevca Nouă Andriașevca Veche Novocotovsc Priozernoe Uiutnoe Novosavițcaia, loc. st. c. f. Ghidirim Goian Iagorlîc Haraba Harmațca Hîrjău Mihailovca Nouă Sărăței Hîrtop Bruslachi Marian Mocreachi	Hlinaia, Grigoriopol Hlinaia, Slobozia Hristovaia Hrușca Frunzăuca Jura Lenin Pervomaisc Pobeda Stanislavca Lunga Mălăiești Cernița Mihailovca Mocra Basarabca Șevcenco Zaporojeț Molochișul Mare Nezavertailovca Ocnița Ofatinți Novaia Jizni Parcani Pervomaisc Plopi Podoima Podoimița Popencu Chirov Vladimirovca Zăzuleni Rașcov Iantarnoe	Rotari Bodeni Socolovca Severinovca Slobozia-Rașcov Sovetscoe Vasilievca Speia Stroiești Sucleia Șipca Vesioloe Tașlîc Teiu Tocmagiu Tîrnauca Țîbuleuca Ulmu Ulmul Mic Lîsaia Gora Vadul Turcului Molochișul Mic Valea Adîncă Constantinovca Vărăncău Buschi Gherșunovca Vinogradnoe Vladimirovca Constantinovca Nicolscoe

== See also ==
- Administrative divisions of Moldova
- List of cities and towns in Moldova
- Communes of Moldova
