= Parcani =

Parcani may refer to:

- Parcani, Prozor, a village in Bosnia and Herzegovina
- Parcani, Şoldăneşti, a commune in Moldova
- Parcani, Soroca, a commune in Moldova
- Parcani, Transnistria, a commune in Moldova
- Parcani, a village in Răciula Commune, Călăraşi district, Moldova
- Parcani (Sopot), a village in Belgrade, Serbia
