= Taraclia (disambiguation) =

Taraclia may refer to:

- Taraclia, a city
- Taraclia County, a former administrative subdivision of Moldova
- Taraclia district, an administrative subdivision of Moldova
- Taraclia, Căuşeni, a commune in Căuşeni district, Moldova
- Taraclia, a village in Plopi Commune, Cantemir district
- Taraclia, a village in Sadîc Commune, Cantemir district
- Taraclia de Salcie, a commune in Cahul district
