= Bădragii Noi =

- Village
- Location within Edineț
- Coordinates: 48°3′48″N 27°4′28″E
- Country: Moldova

Government
  - Mayor: Boris Gîscă (PDM)
- Elevation: 103 m (338 ft)

Population (2014 census)
  - Total: 1,093
- Time zone: UTC+2 (EET)
  - Summer (DST): UTC+3 (EEST)
- Postal code: MD-4614

Bădragii Noi is a village in Edineț District, Moldova.
