= Putinești =

- Village
- Location within Moldova
- Coordinates: 47.8372222222°N 28.1225°E
- Country: Moldova
- District: Florești District

Government
  - Mayor: Ghenadie Chefu (PLDM)

Population (2014 census)
  - Total: 1,614
- Time zone: UTC+2 (EET)
  - Summer (DST): UTC+3 (EEST)

Putinești is a village in the north-eastern Florești District of Moldova.
