= Catranîc =

- Village
- Location within Moldova
- Coordinates: 47.5947222222°N 27.8013888889°E
- Country: Moldova
- District: Fălești

Government
  - Mayor: Sîrbu Iurie (Independent Candidate)

Population (2014 census)
  - Total: 1,214
- Time zone: UTC+2 (EET)
  - Summer (DST): UTC+3 (EEST)

Catranîc is a village in Fălești District, Moldova.
