= Bușăuca =

- Village
- Location within Moldova
- Coordinates: 47.5913888889°N 28.7902777778°E
- Country: Moldova
- District: Rezina District

Government
  - Mayor: Vadim Ciobanu (PLDM)

Population (2014 census)
  - Total: 933
- Time zone: UTC+2 (EET)
  - Summer (DST): UTC+3 (EEST)

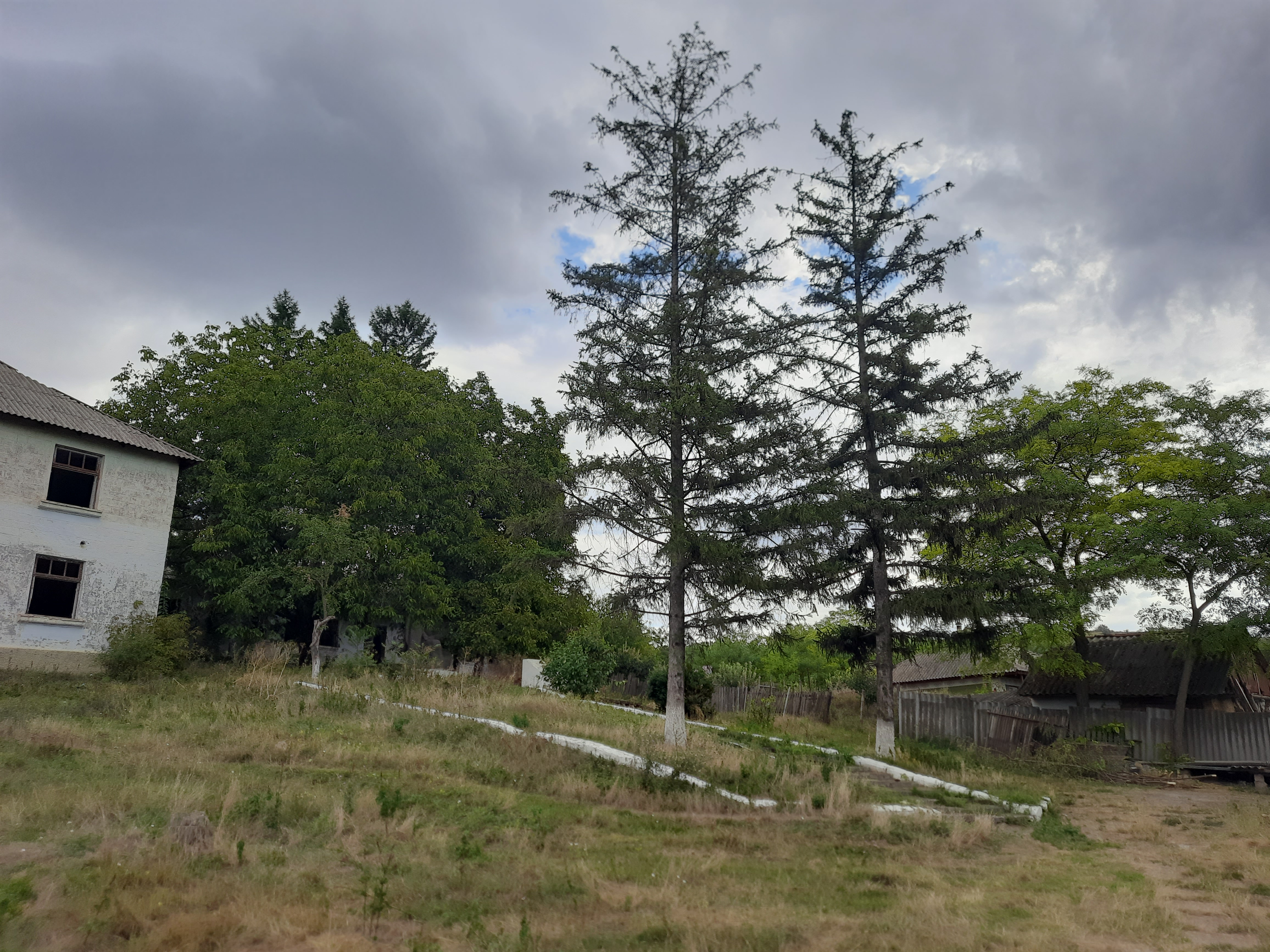

Bușăuca is a village in Rezina District, Moldova.
