= Sturzeni =

- Village
- Location within Moldova
- Coordinates: 47.9013888889°N 27.4605555556°E
- Country: Moldova
- District: Rîșcani

Government
  - Mayor: Dumitru Scripliuc (PDM)

Population (2014 census)
  - Total: 1,055
- Time zone: UTC+2 (EET)
  - Summer (DST): UTC+3 (EEST)

Sturzeni is a village in Rîșcani District, Moldova.
