= Otac =

Village in Rezona District, Moldova

- Location within Moldova
- Coordinates: 47.5866666667°N 28.8311111111°E
- Country: Moldova
- District: Rezina District

Government
  - Mayor: Alexei Bîtca (PLDM)

Population (2014 census)
  - Total: 500
- Time zone: UTC+2 (EET)
  - Summer (DST): UTC+3 (EEST)

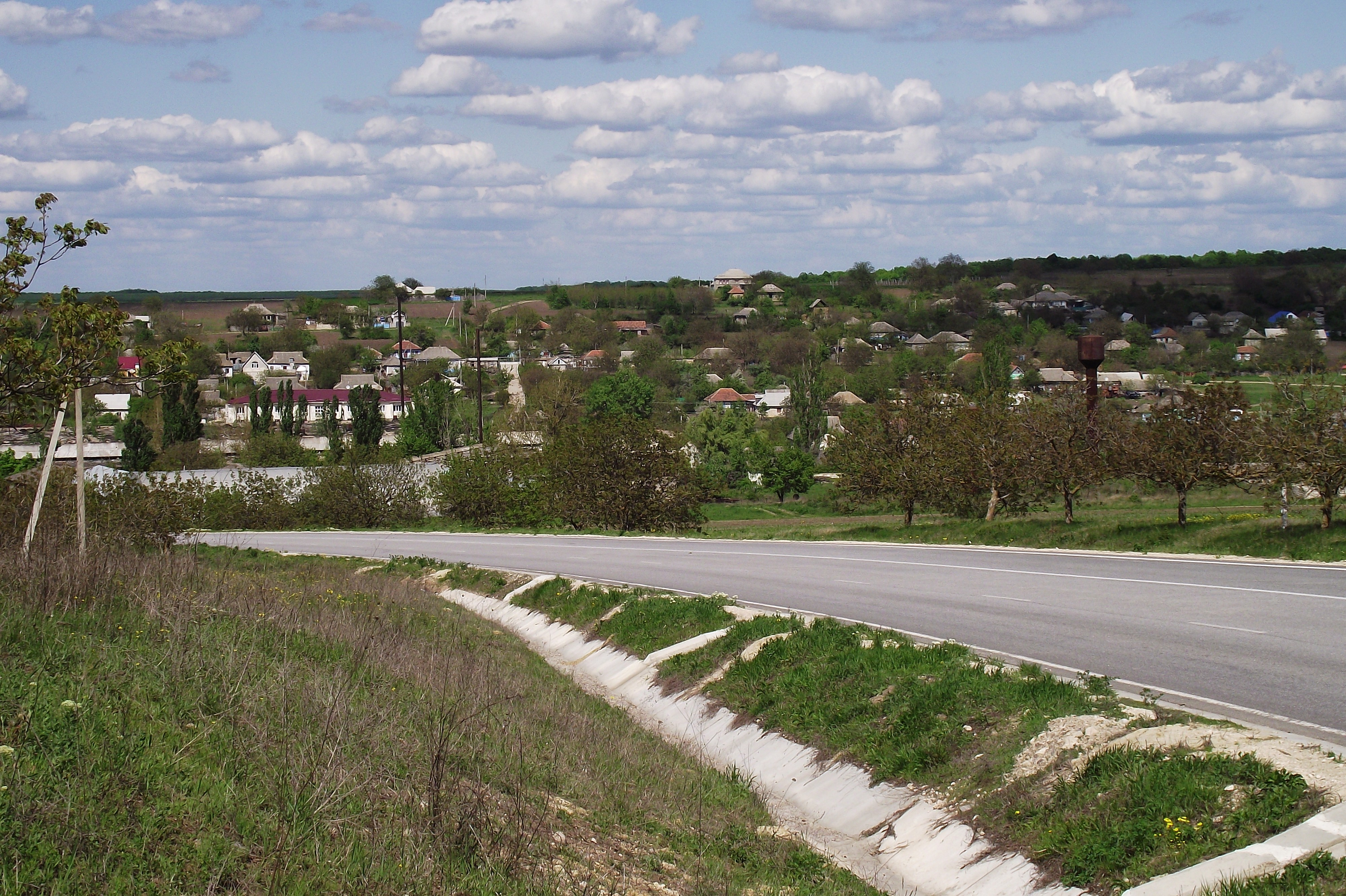
Panorama of Otac

Otac is a village in Rezina District, Moldova.
