= Pervomaiscoe, Hîncești =

Pervomaiscoe
- Village
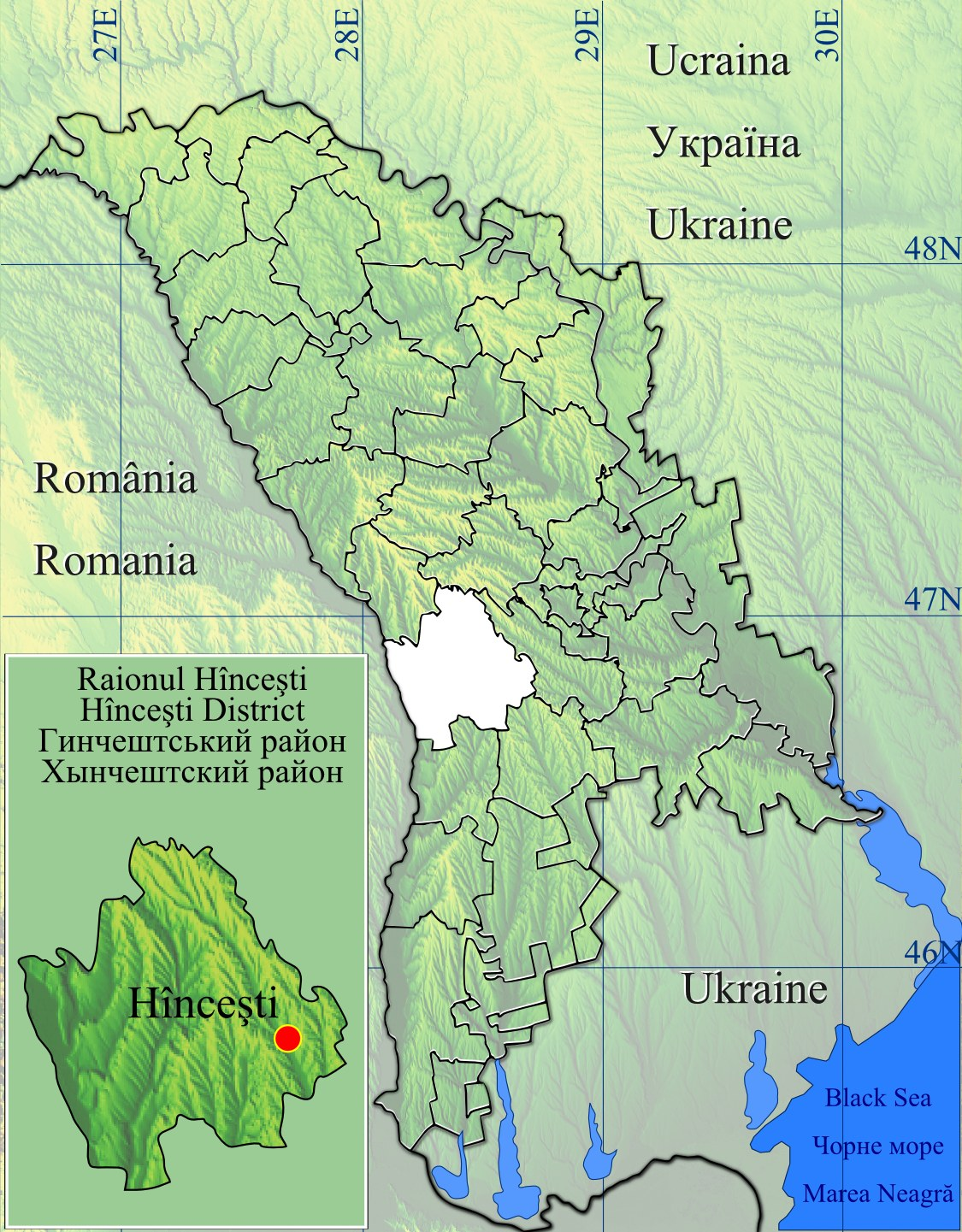
- Location within Hîncești
- Coordinates: 46°53′10″N 28°19′23″E
- Country: Moldova
- District: Hîncești District

Government
  - Mayor: Victor Maxim (PDM)

Population (2014 census)
  - Total: 509
- Time zone: UTC+2 (EET)
  - Summer (DST): UTC+3 (EEST)
- Postal code: MD-3444

Pervomaiscoe is a village in Hîncești District, Moldova.
