= Sîngereii Noi =

- Commune
- Location within Moldova
- Coordinates: 47°43′24″N 28°5′13″E
- Country: Moldova
- District: Sîngerei District

Government
  - Mayor: Ceaușceac Valentina (PLDM)

Area
  - Total: 367 km^{2} (142 sq mi)
- Elevation: 163 m (535 ft)

Population (2014)
  - Total: 5,122
- Time zone: UTC+2 (EET)
  - Summer (DST): UTC+3 (EEST)
- Postal code: MD-6238

Sîngereii Noi is a commune in Sîngerei District, Moldova. It is composed of two villages, Mărinești and Sîngereii Noi.
