= Soltănești =

- Village
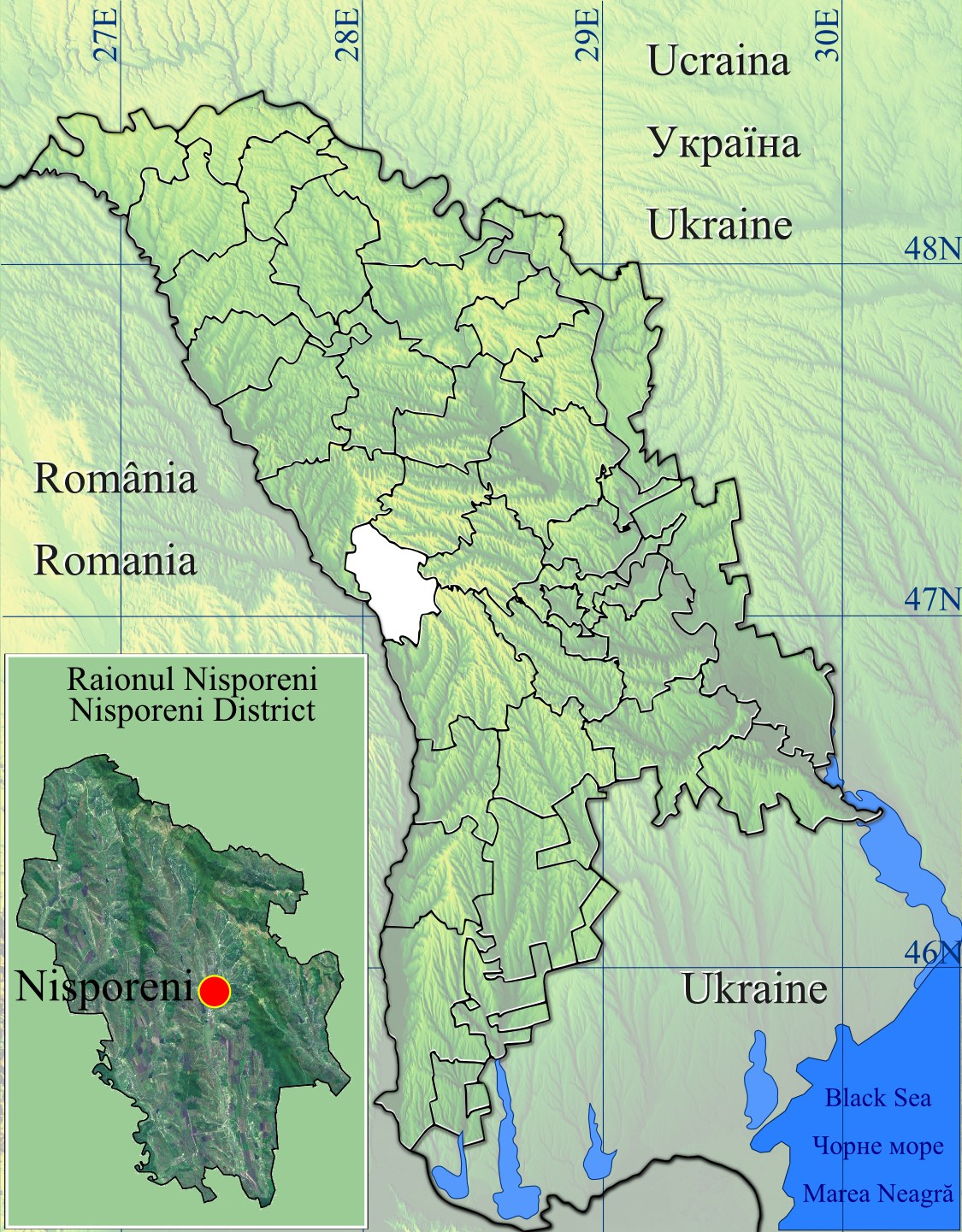
- Location within Nisporeni
- Coordinates: 47°3′39″N 28°6′34″E
- Country: Moldova
- District: Nisporeni District

Government
  - Mayor: Pavel Cuciurca (PDM)
- Elevation: 57 m (187 ft)

Population (2014 census)
  - Total: 1,439
- Time zone: UTC+2 (EET)
  - Summer (DST): UTC+3 (EEST)
- Postal code: MD-6435

Soltănești is a village in Nisporeni District, Moldova.
