= Bolțun =

- Village
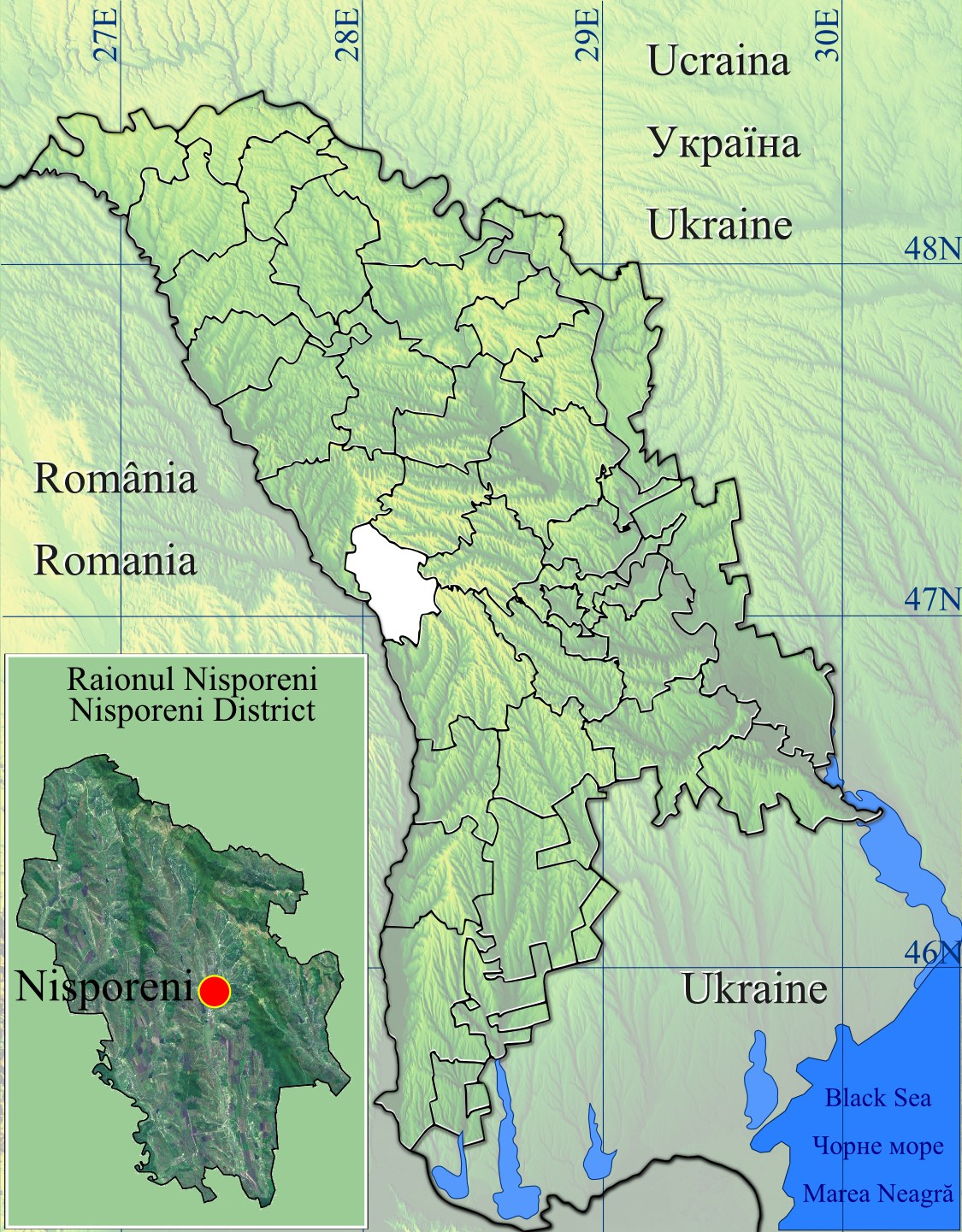
- Location within Nisporeni
- Coordinates: 47°1′39″N 28°17′28″E
- Country: Moldova

Government
  - Mayor: Valeriu Ciobanu (PDM)

Area
  - Total: 4.90 km^{2} (1.89 sq mi)
- Elevation: 111 m (364 ft)

Population (2014 census)
  - Total: 936
- Time zone: UTC+2 (EET)
  - Summer (DST): UTC+3 (EEST)
- Postal code: MD-6416

Bolțun is a village in Nisporeni District, Moldova.
