= Chetroșica Nouă =

- Village
- Location within Edineț
- Coordinates: 48°7′8″N 27°27′28″E
- Country: Moldova

Government
  - Mayor: Eugenia Dociu (PLDM)
- Elevation: 201 m (659 ft)

Population (2014 census)
  - Total: 1,068
- Time zone: UTC+2 (EET)
  - Summer (DST): UTC+3 (EEST)
- Postal code: MD-4621

Chetroșica Nouă is a village in Edineț District, Moldova.
