= Crăsnășeni =

- Village
- Location within Moldova
- Coordinates: 47.4325°N 28.3983333333°E
- Country: Moldova
- District: Telenești

Government
  - Mayor: Vasile Marandici (PDM)

Population (2014 census)
  - Total: 1,015
- Time zone: UTC+2 (EET)
  - Summer (DST): UTC+3 (EEST)

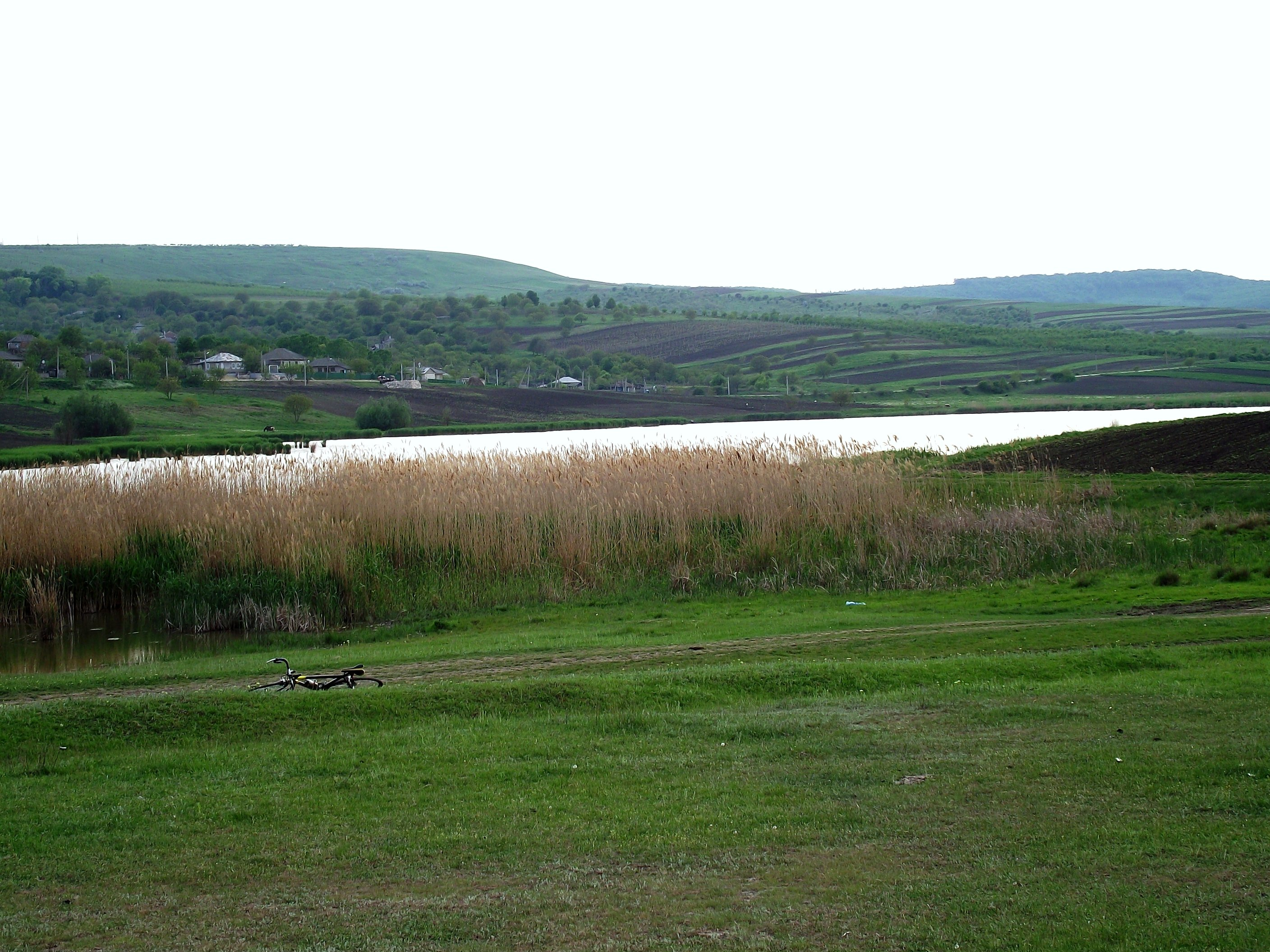
Landscape around Crăsnășeni

Crăsnășeni is a village in Telenești District, Moldova.
