= Roșcani, Strășeni =

Roșcani
- Village
- Location within Moldova
- Coordinates: 47.1472222222°N 28.6775°E
- Country: Moldova
- District: Strășeni District

Government
  - Mayor: Tamara Josan (PLDM)

Population (2014 census)
  - Total: 1,635
- Time zone: UTC+2 (EET)
  - Summer (DST): UTC+3 (EEST)

Roșcani is a village in Strășeni District, Moldova.
