= Tîrgul Vertiujeni =

- Village
- Location within Moldova
- Coordinates: 48.0277777778°N 28.5347222222°E
- Country: Moldova
- District: Florești District

Government
  - Mayor: Anatolie Murzac (PLDM)

Population (2014 census)
  - Total: 730
- Time zone: UTC+2 (EET)
  - Summer (DST): UTC+3 (EEST)

Tîrgul Vertiujeni is a village in Florești District, Moldova.
