= Meșeni =

- Village
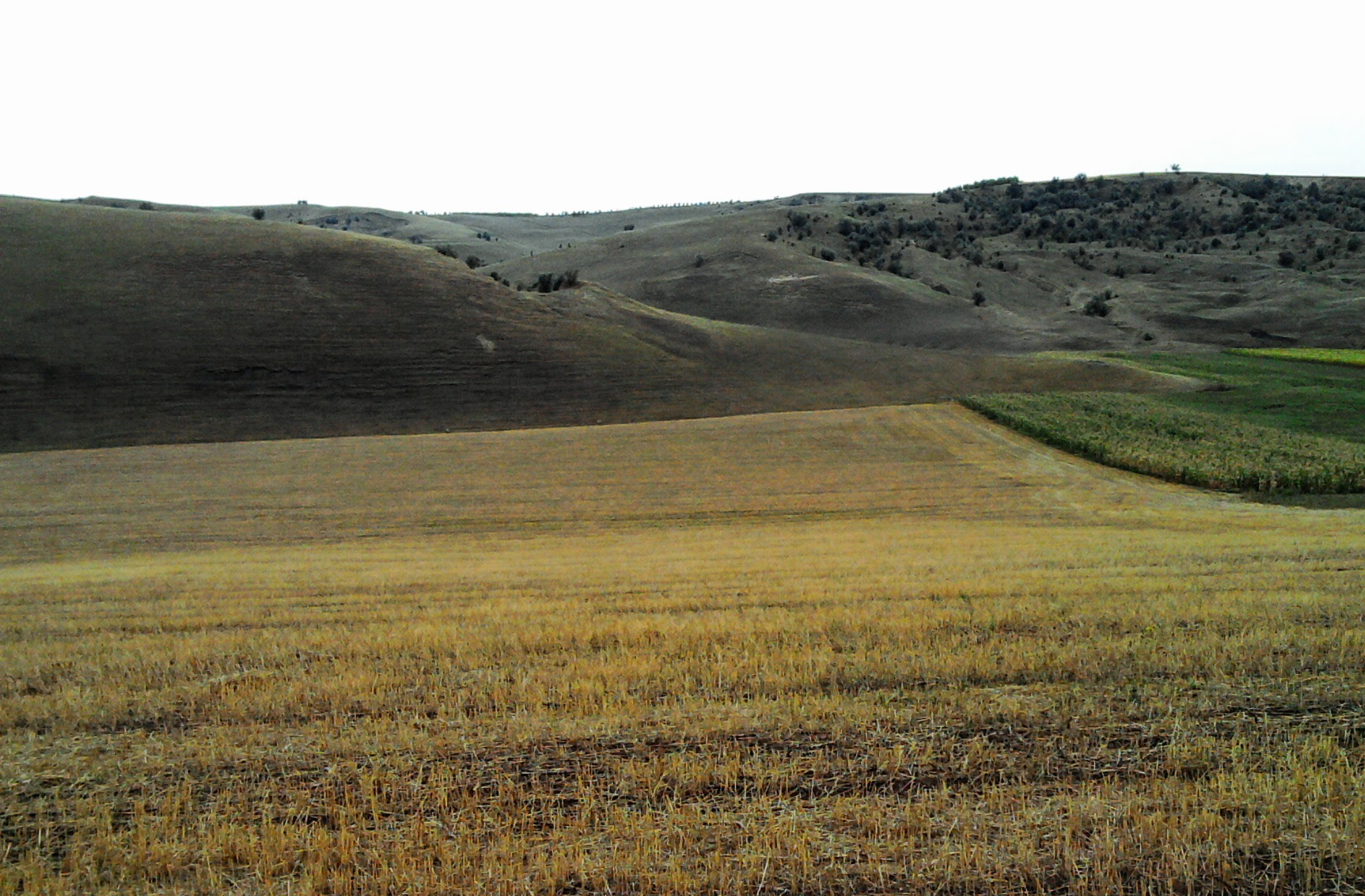
- Meșeni

- Location within Moldova
- Coordinates: 47.6627777778°N 28.6333333333°E
- Country: Moldova
- District: Rezina District

Government
  - Mayor: Efim Mardari (PLDM)

Population (2014 census)
  - Total: 833
- Time zone: UTC+2 (EET)
  - Summer (DST): UTC+3 (EEST)

Meșeni is a village in Rezina District, Moldova.
