= Pohorniceni =

- Commune and village
- Interactive map of Pohorniceni
- Country: Moldova
- District: Orhei District

Population (2014 census)
  - Total: 789
- Time zone: UTC+2 (EET)
  - Summer (DST): UTC+3 (EEST)

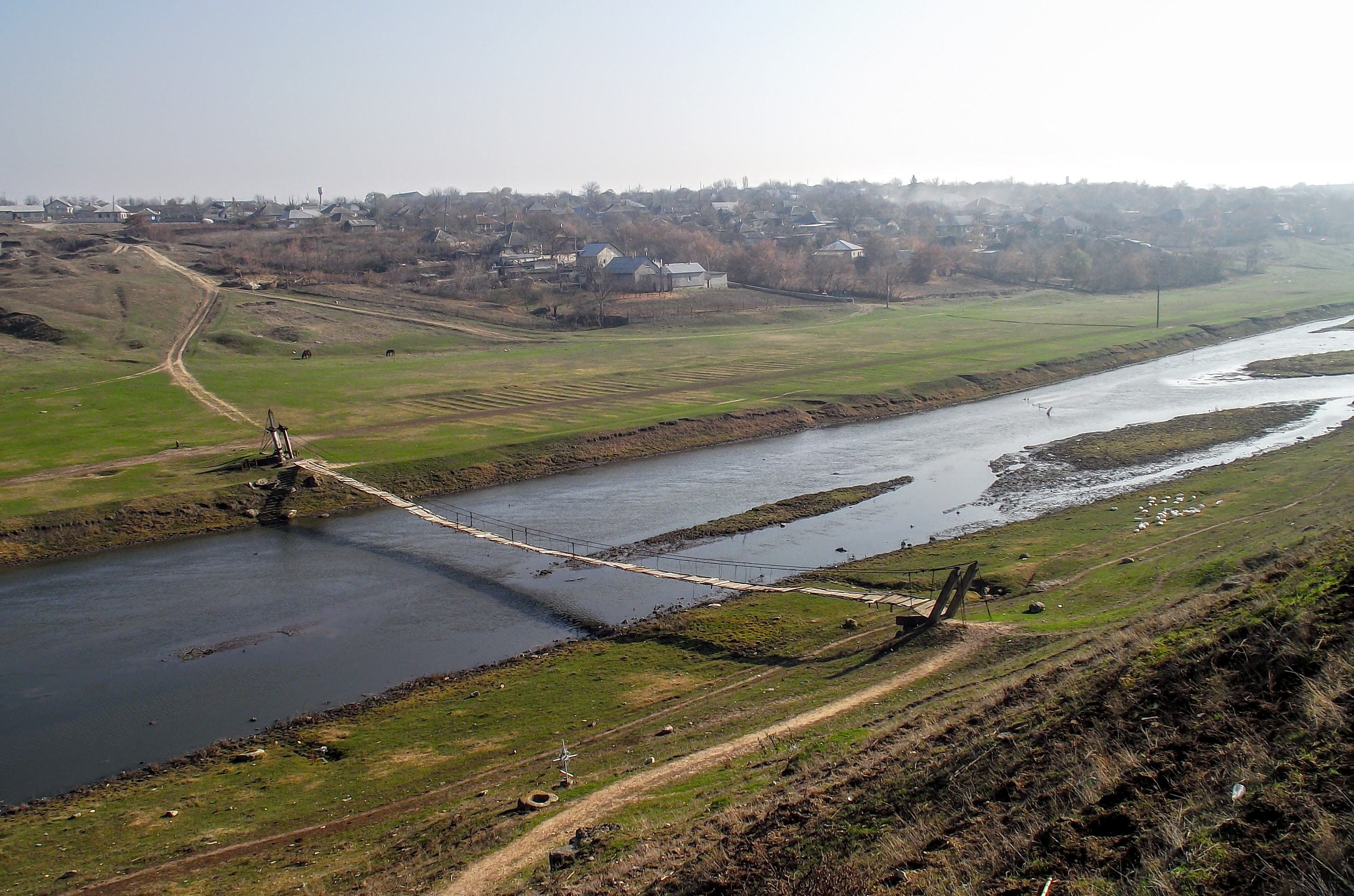
Road in Paharniceni

Pohorniceni is a village in Orhei District, Moldova.
