= Rădenii Vechi =

- Village
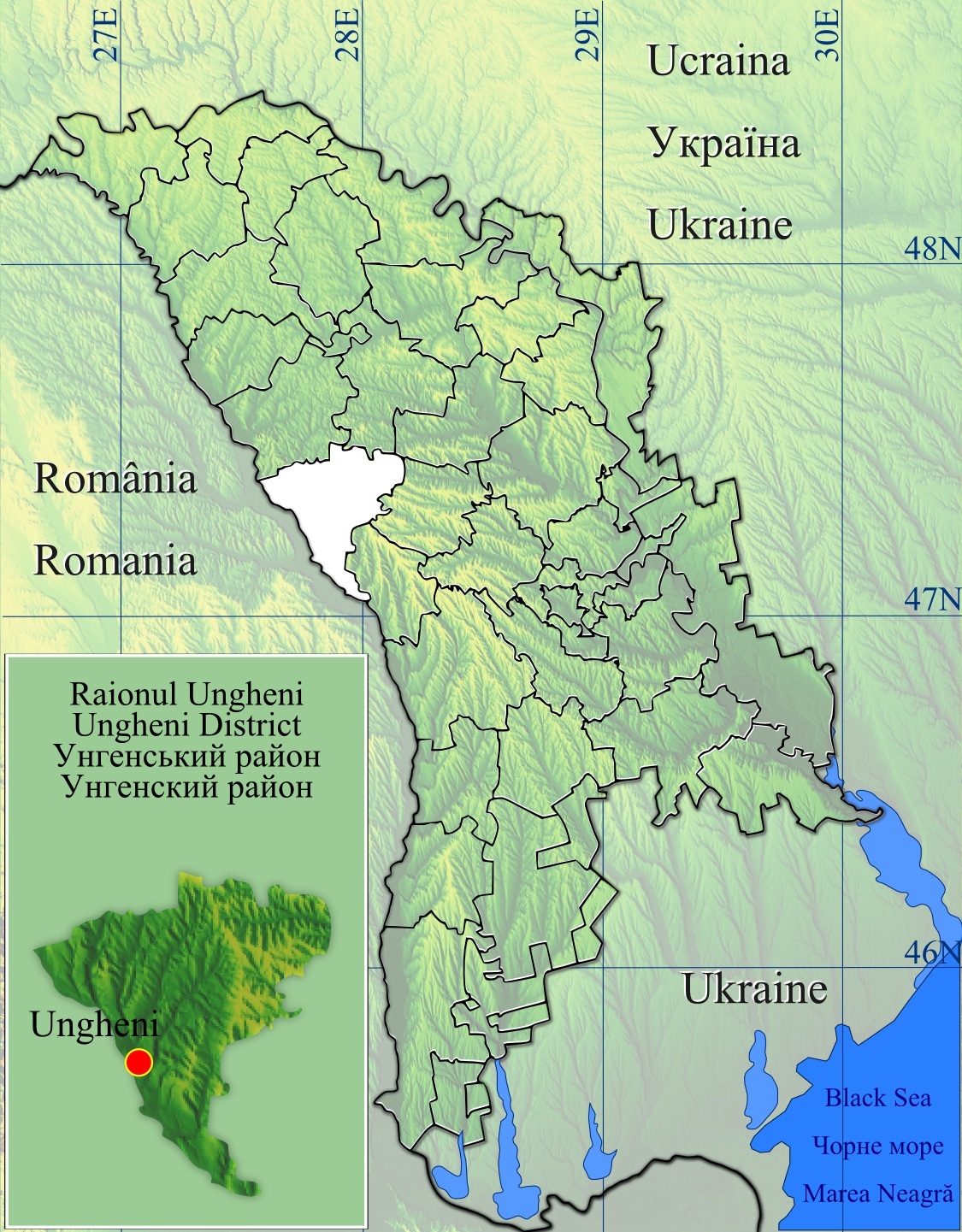
- Location within Ungheni
- Coordinates: 47°17′47″N 27°59′44″E
- Country: Moldova
- District: Ungheni District

Government
  - Mayor: Vera Golan (PL)

Population (2014 census)
  - Total: 1,614
- Time zone: UTC+2 (EET)
  - Summer (DST): UTC+3 (EEST)
- Postal code: MD-3642

Rădenii Vechi is a village in Ungheni District, Moldova.
