= Ghelăuza =

- Commune
- Location within Moldova
- Country: Moldova
- District: Strășeni District

Population (2014)
  - Total: 1,244
- Time zone: UTC+2 (EET)
  - Summer (DST): UTC+3 (EEST)
- Postal code: MD-3718

Ghelăuza is a commune in Strășeni District, Moldova. It is composed of two villages, Ghelăuza and Saca.
