= Vărzăreștii Noi =

- Village
- Location within Moldova
- Coordinates: 47.2305555556°N 28.4441666667°E
- Country: Moldova
- District: Călărași District

Government
  - Mayor: Grigore Moisei (PSRM)

Population (2014 census)
  - Total: 1,323
- Time zone: UTC+2 (EET)
  - Summer (DST): UTC+3 (EEST)

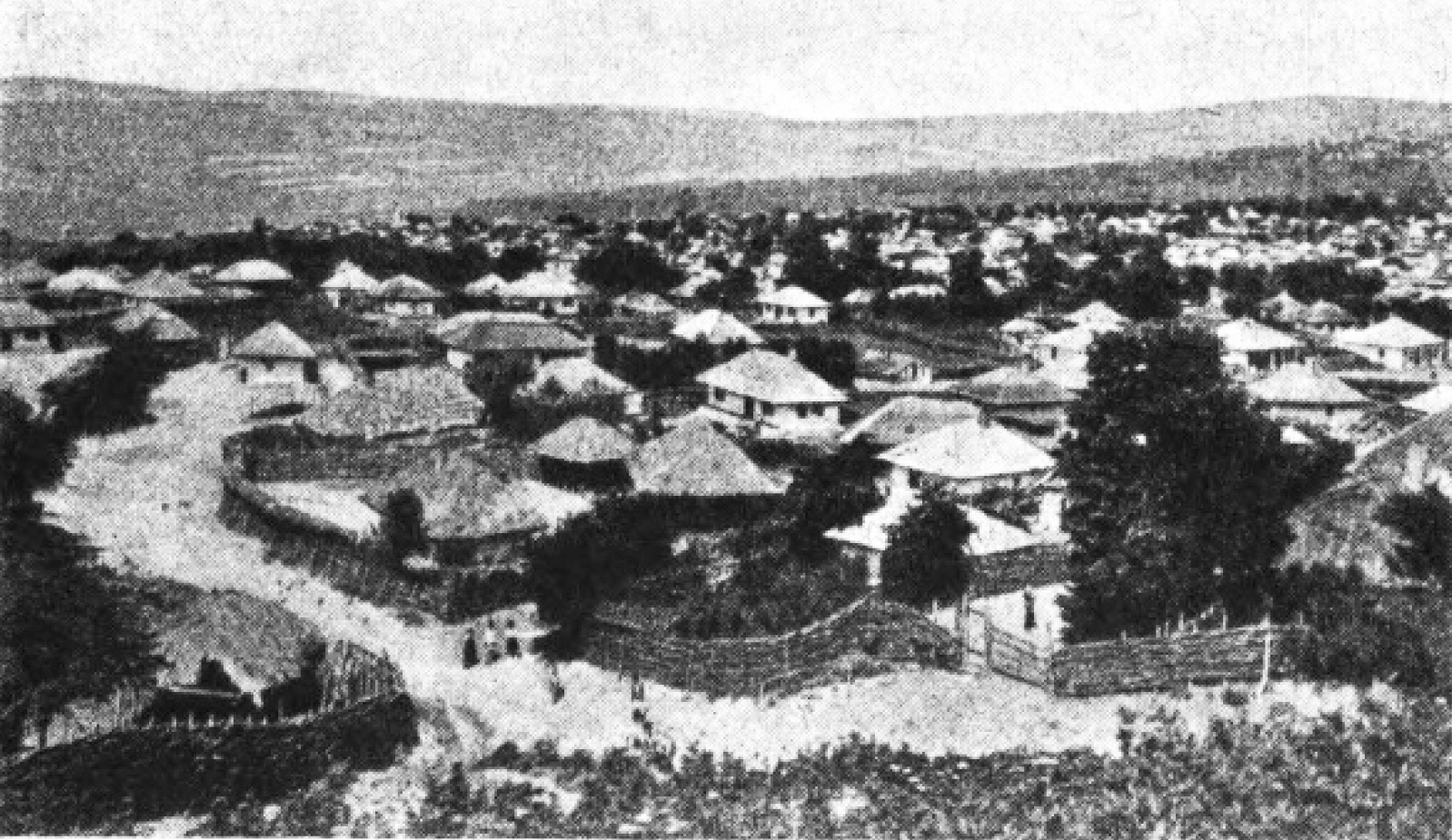
An image of the village.

Vărzăreștii Noi is a village in Călărași District, Moldova.
