= Pănășești =

- Commune
- Location in Moldova
- Coordinates: 47°09′N 28°31′E
- Country: Moldova
- District: Strășeni District

Population (2014)
  - Total: 3,000
- Time zone: UTC+2 (EET)
  - Summer (DST): UTC+3 (EEST)

Pănășești is a commune in Strășeni District, Moldova. It is composed of two villages, Ciobanca and Pănășești.

== Education ==
The kindergarten in the village of Pănășești was opened in March 2010, after renovation. This is the 41st kindergarten in the country to be re-opened by the Ministry of Education (Moldova) with the help of the local communities and international partners, Minister Leonid Bujor said at the inauguration.

== Notable people ==
- Elena Robu-Popa

== Bibliography ==
- Dinu Poștarencu, Pănășești: File de istorie, Chișinău, 2002, ISBN 9975-78-201-9
