= Tăura Veche =

- Commune
- Interactive map of Tăura Veche
- Country: Moldova
- District: Sîngerei District

Population (2014)
  - Total: 581
- Time zone: UTC+2 (EET)
  - Summer (DST): UTC+3 (EEST)
- Postal code: MD-6240

Tăura Veche is a commune in Sîngerei District, Moldova. It is composed of two villages, Tăura Nouă and Tăura Veche.
