= Tartaul de Salcie =

- Commune
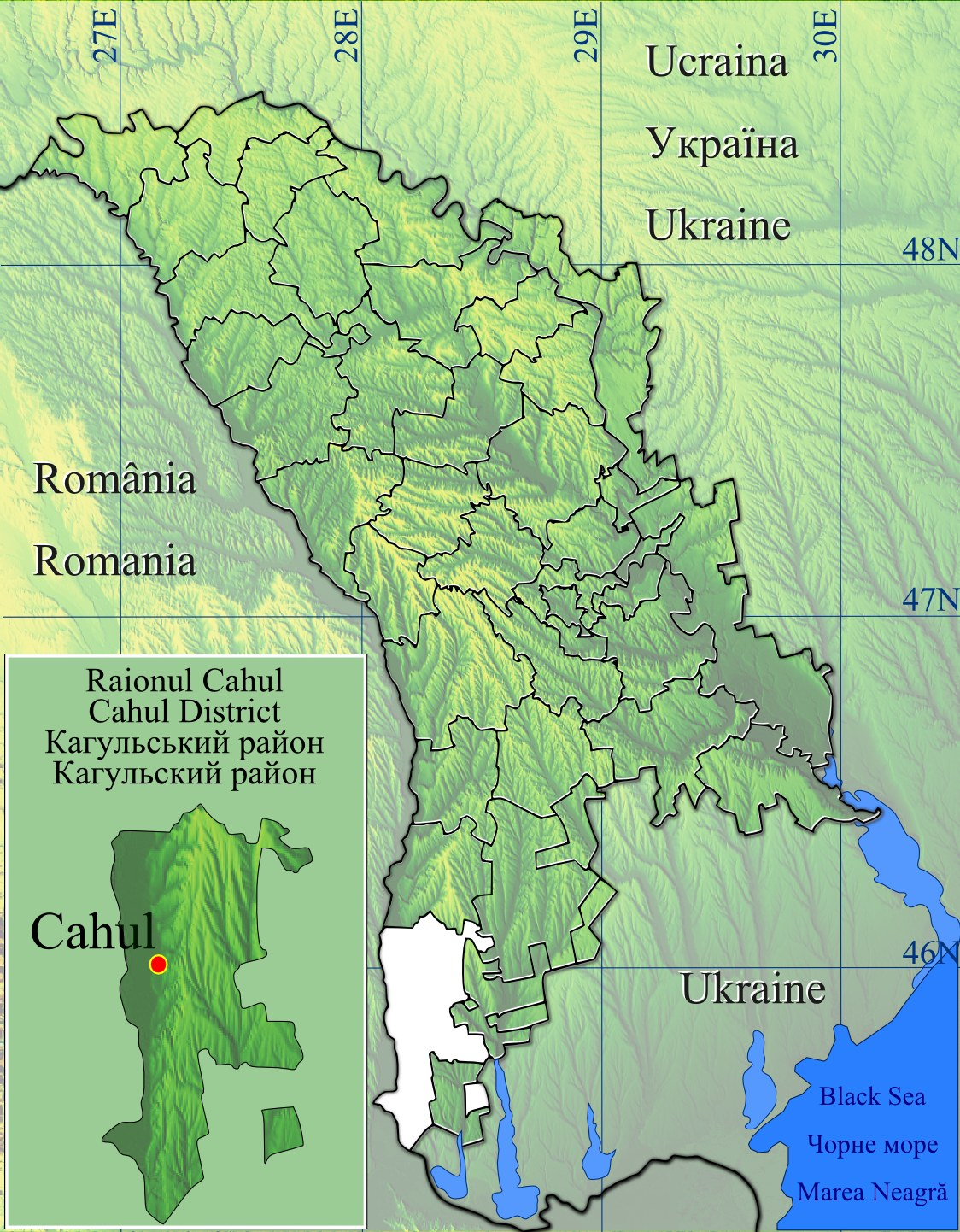
- Location within Cahul
- Coordinates: 45°58′17″N 28°24′40″E
- Country: Moldova
- District: Cahul District

Government
  - Mayor: Stoianov Iurie

Population (2014 census)
  - Total: 1,836
- Time zone: UTC+2 (EET)
  - Summer (DST): UTC+3 (EEST)
- Postal code: MD-3930

Tartaul de Salcie is a commune in Cahul District, Moldova. It is composed of two villages, Tartaul de Salcie and Tudorești. It is situated in the south of Moldova at 433 ft (132 m) above sea level. The population in 2002 was 250.
