= Cunicea =

- Village
- Location within Moldova
- Coordinates: 47.9047222222°N 28.6469444444°E
- Country: Moldova
- District: Florești District

Government
  - Mayor: Tatiana Corniencova (PCRM)

Population (2014 census)
  - Total: 3,069
- Time zone: UTC+2 (EET)
  - Summer (DST): UTC+3 (EEST)

Cunicea is a village in Florești District, Moldova.
