= Coteala =

- Village
- Location within Moldova
- Coordinates: 48°19′44″N 26°51′47″E
- Country: Moldova

Government
  - Mayor: Mircea Creciun (Independent)
- Elevation: 181 m (594 ft)

Population (2014 census)
  - Total: 1,899
- Time zone: UTC+2 (EET)
  - Summer (DST): UTC+3 (EEST)
- Postal code: MD-4725

Coteala is a village in Briceni District, Moldova.
