= Slobozia, Ștefan Vodă =

Slobozia
- Village
- Location within Moldova
- Coordinates: 46°30′29″N 29°44′25″E
- Country: Moldova
- District: Ștefan Vodă District

Government
  - Mayor: Anatolie Zavalișca (PDM)

Area
  - Total: 42.98 km^{2} (16.59 sq mi)
- Elevation: 147 m (482 ft)

Population (2014 census)
  - Total: 3,473
- Time zone: UTC+2 (EET)
  - Summer (DST): UTC+3 (EEST)
- Postal code: MD-4233

Slobozia is a village in Ștefan Vodă District, Moldova.
