= Văratic, Ialoveni =

Văratic
- Village
- Location within Moldova
- Coordinates: 46.8094444444°N 29.0633333333°E
- Country: Moldova
- District: Ialoveni District

Government
  - Mayor: Iurie Chirman (PDM)

Population (2014 census)
  - Total: 1,128
- Time zone: UTC+2 (EET)
  - Summer (DST): UTC+3 (EEST)

Văratic is a village in Ialoveni District, Moldova.
