= Viișoara, Edineț =

Viișoara
- Village
- Location within Edineț
- Coordinates: 48°5′46″N 27°2′52″E
- Country: Moldova

Government
  - Mayor: Ina Ciubotaru (PLDM)
- Elevation: 119 m (390 ft)

Population (2014 census)
  - Total: 1,343
- Time zone: UTC+2 (EET)
  - Summer (DST): UTC+3 (EEST)
- Postal code: MD-4645

Viișoara is a village in Edineț District, Moldova.
