= Cușmirca =

- Village
- Location within Moldova
- Coordinates: 47°54′N 28°42′E
- Country: Moldova
- District: Șoldănești

Government
  - Mayor: Alexei Coadă (PLDM)

Population (2014 census)
  - Total: 2,066
- Time zone: UTC+2 (EET)
  - Summer (DST): UTC+3 (EEST)

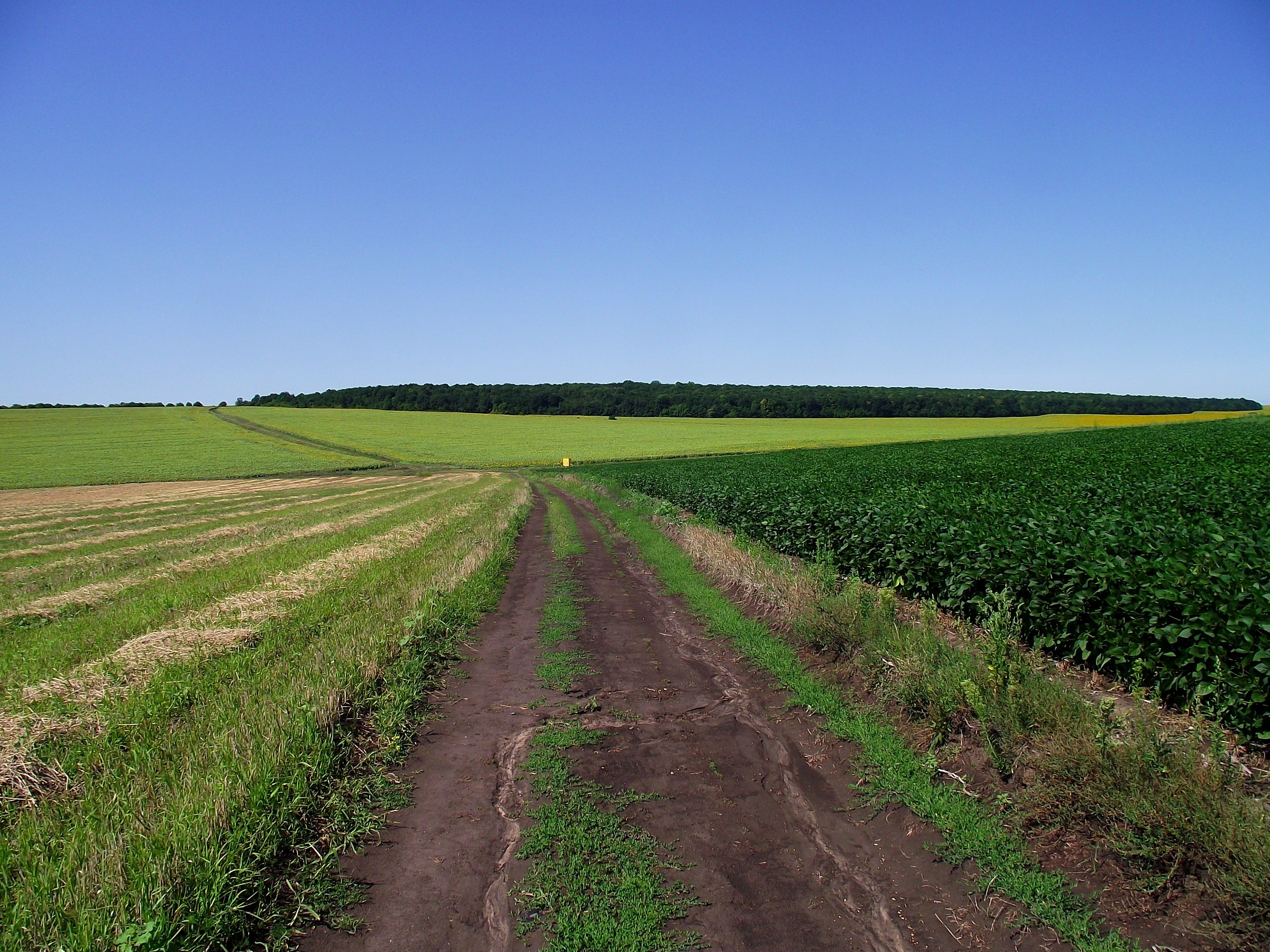
fields in Cușmirca

Cușmirca is a village in Șoldănești District, Moldova.
