= Ciocîlteni =

- Commune
- Location in Moldova
- Coordinates: 47°29′35″N 28°36′41″E
- Country: Moldova
- District: Orhei District

Population (2014)
  - Total: 2,621
- Time zone: UTC+2 (EET)
  - Summer (DST): UTC+3 (EEST)
- Website: http://www.ciocilteni.com

Ciocîlteni is a commune in Orhei District, Moldova. It is composed of three villages: Ciocîlteni, Clișova Nouă and Fedoreuca.
