= Vărvăreuca =

- Commune
- Location within Moldova
- Coordinates: 47°52′44″N 28°18′37″E
- Country: Moldova
- District: Florești District

Government
  - Mayor: Nina Ivanes (PCRM)
- Elevation: 118 m (387 ft)

Population (2014)
  - Total: 2,860
- Time zone: UTC+2 (EET)
  - Summer (DST): UTC+3 (EEST)

Vărvăreuca is a commune in Floreşti District, Moldova. It is composed of two villages, Stîrceni and Vărvăreuca.
