= Orac, Leova =

Orac
- Village
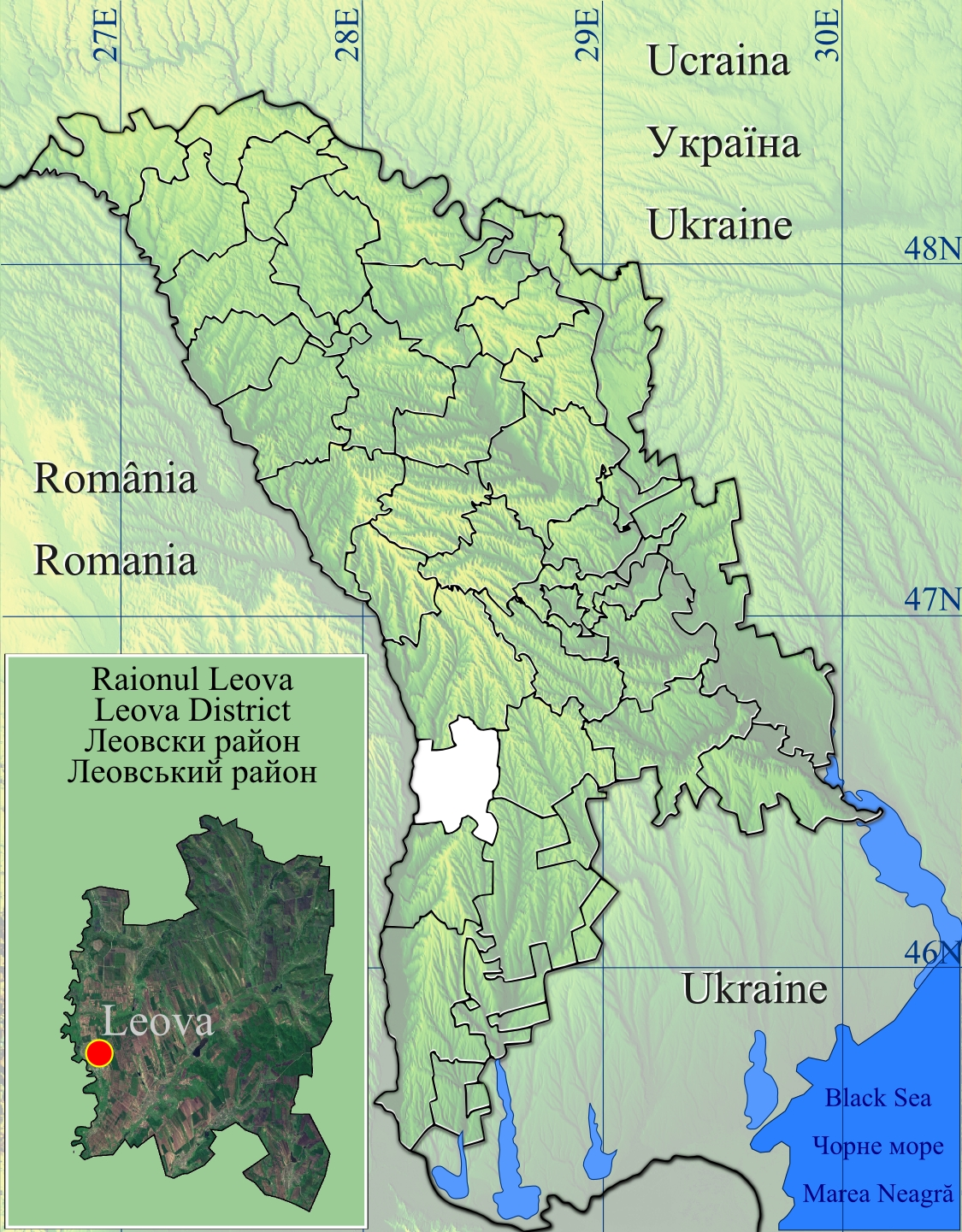
- Location within Moldova Leova
- Coordinates: 46°39′50″N 28°27′38″E
- Country: Moldova
- District: Leova District

Government
  - Mayor: Ion Cvasnei (PLDM)
- Elevation: 94 m (308 ft)

Population (2014 census)
  - Total: 1,161
- Time zone: UTC+2 (EET)
  - Summer (DST): UTC+3 (EEST)
- Postal code: MD-6322

Orac is a village in Leova District, Moldova. c
