= Chirianca =

- Village
- Location within Moldova
- Coordinates: 47.2555555556°N 28.5308333333°E
- Country: Moldova
- District: Strășeni

Government
  - Mayor: Iurie Diacenco (PDM)
- Elevation: 105 m (344 ft)

Population (2014 census)
  - Total: 957
- Time zone: UTC+2 (EET)
  - Summer (DST): UTC+3 (EEST)
- Postal code: MD-3713

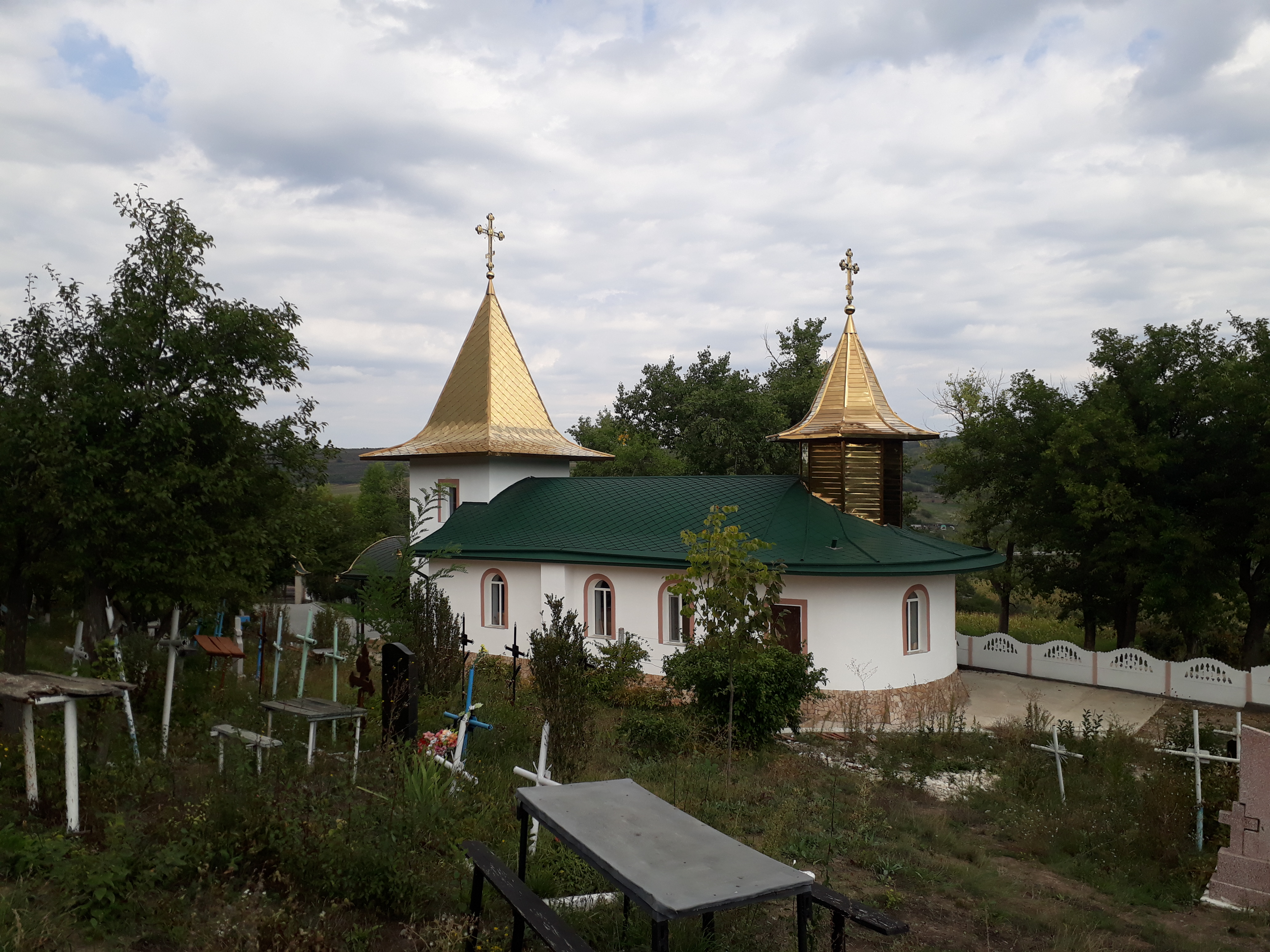
Church of the Ascension of the Lord in Chirianca.

Chirianca is a village in Strășeni District, Moldova.
