= Vasileuți =

- Commune
- Location within Moldova
- Coordinates: 48.0°N 27.5°E
- Country: Moldova
- District: Rîșcani District

Government
  - Mayor: Vasilii Pițenti

Population (2014)
  - Total: 2,871
- Time zone: UTC+2 (EET)
  - Summer (DST): UTC+3 (EEST)

Vasileuți is a commune in Rîșcani District, Moldova. It is composed of six villages: Armanca, Ciubara, Mihăilenii Noi, Moșeni, Știubeieni and Vasileuți.
