= Zăluceni =

- Village
- Location within Moldova
- Coordinates: 48.0519444444°N 28.5586111111°E
- Country: Moldova
- District: Florești District

Government
  - Mayor: Stepan Prisăcari (PDM)

Population (2014 census)
  - Total: 935
- Time zone: UTC+2 (EET)
  - Summer (DST): UTC+3 (EEST)

Zăluceni is a village in Florești District, Moldova.

Zaluceni has been a village since a long time ago

Zăluceni is a village in Florești district. The village has an area of about 1.15 square kilometers, with a perimeter of 6.36 km. Zăluceni is the only village in the commune with the same name located at a distance of 36 km from the city of Florești and 145 km from Chisinau.

History

The first documentary attestation of the village of Zăluceni dates from 1624, when Radu Mihnea voivode reinforced the village of Zaluceni in the land of Sorocii to hetman Miron Barnovschi. Already in 1628 Miron Barnovschi voivod sent the prăcălab de Soroca to investigate the boundaries of some villages, including Zăluceni. In 1646 the village of Zăluceni is again mentioned in a decision document from Vasile Lupu voivod.

The population

According to the 2004 census data, the population of the village was 935 people, of which 50.37% were men and 49.63% were women. The ethnic structure of the population in the village was as follows: 98.18% - Moldovans, 0.86% - Ukrainians, 0.64% - Russians, 0.11% - Gagauz, 0.11% - Bulgarians, 0.11% - other ethnicities.

In the village of Zăluceni, 330 households were registered in the 2004 census, and the average size of a household was 2.8 people.
