= Dancu =

- Village
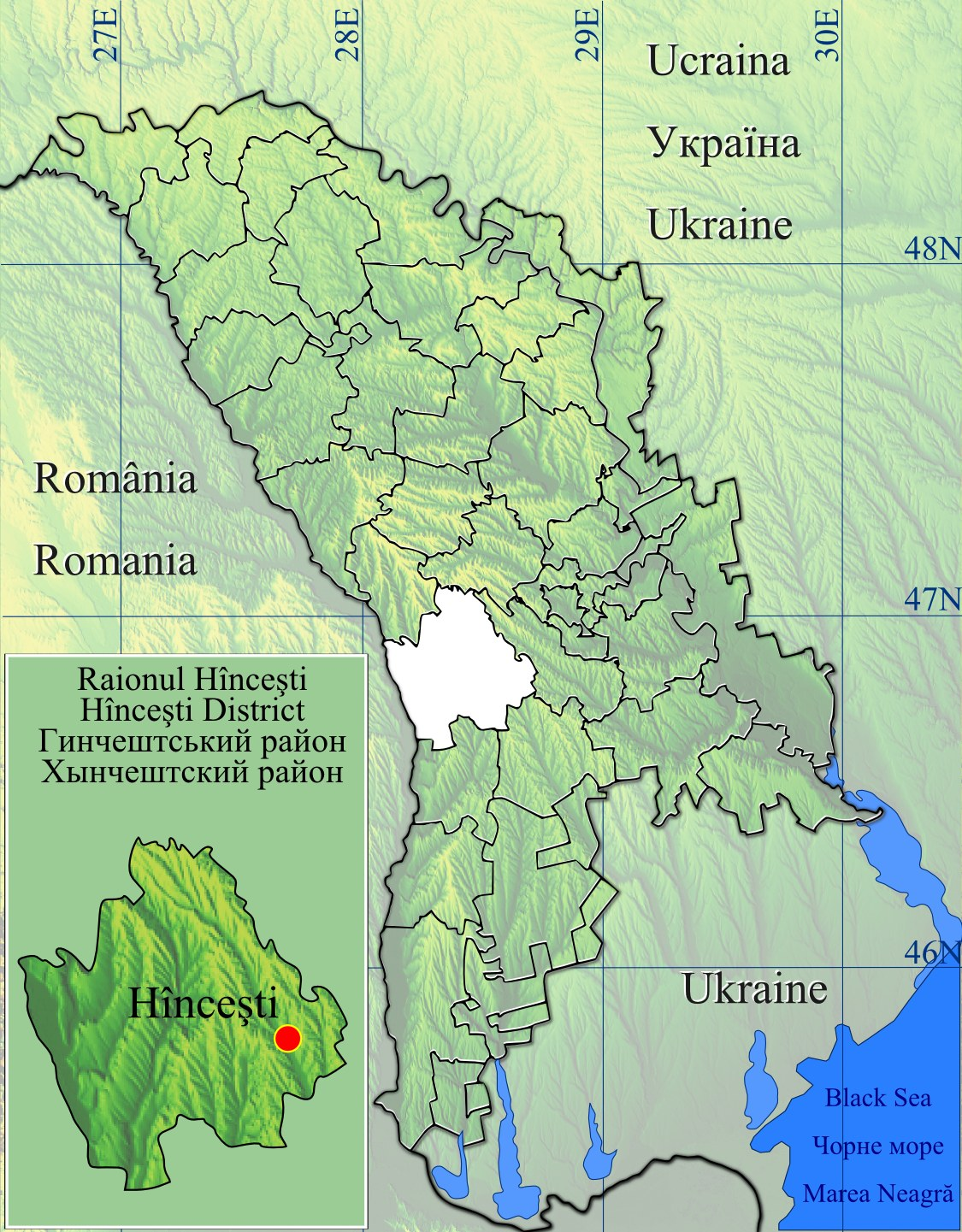
- Location within Hîncești
- Coordinates: 46°45′26″N 28°12′32″E
- Country: Moldova

Government
  - Mayor: Vladimir Pretuleac (PDM)

Population (2014 census)
  - Total: 1,206
- Time zone: UTC+2 (EET)
  - Summer (DST): UTC+3 (EEST)
- Postal code: MD-3424

Dancu is a village in Hîncești District, Moldova.
