= Hirova =

- Village
- Location within Moldova
- Coordinates: 47.4122222222°N 28.2841666667°E
- Country: Moldova
- District: Călărași

Government
  - Mayor: Valeriu Oaserele (PLDM)

Population (2014 census)
  - Total: 1,229
- Time zone: UTC+2 (EET)
  - Summer (DST): UTC+3 (EEST)

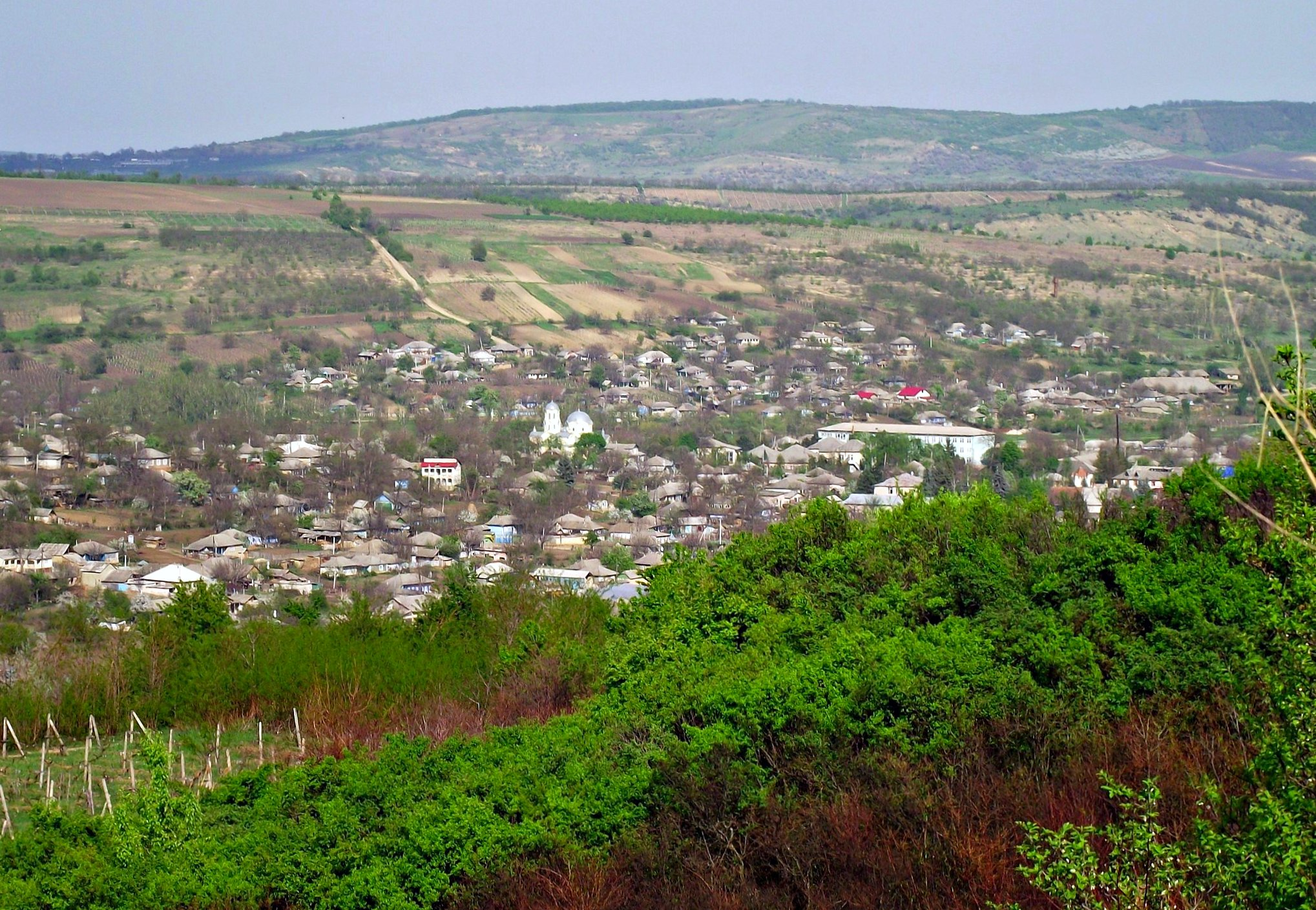
Panorama of Hirova

Hirova is a village in Călărași District, Moldova.
