= Cogîlniceni =

- Village
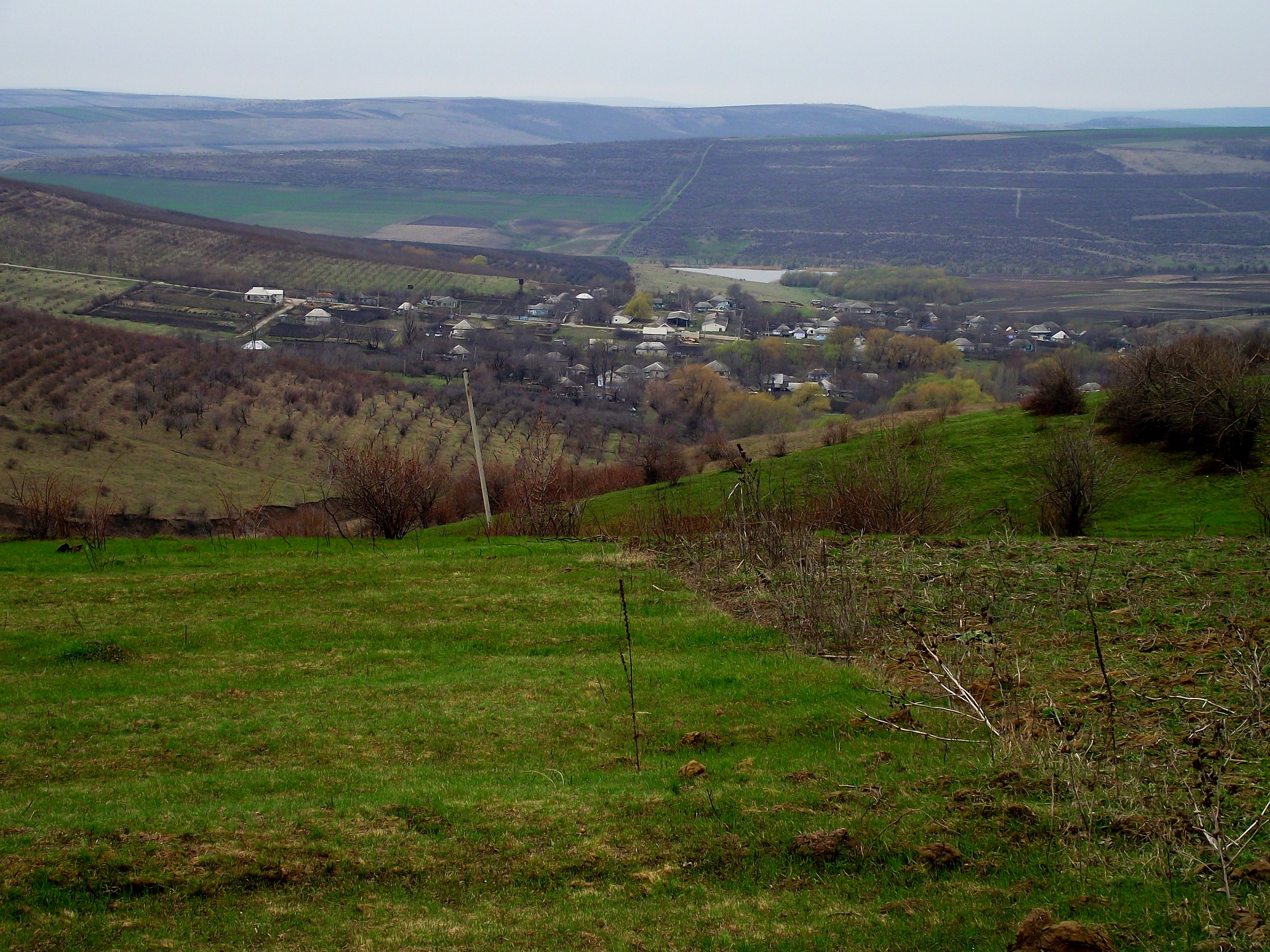

- Location within Moldova
- Coordinates: 47.6347222222°N 28.8208333333°E
- Country: Moldova
- District: Rezina District

Government
  - Mayor: Simion Cotoman (PDM)

Population (2014 census)
  - Total: 475
- Time zone: UTC+2 (EET)
  - Summer (DST): UTC+3 (EEST)

Cogîlniceni is a village in Rezina District, Moldova.
