= Petrunea =

- Village
- Location within Moldova
- Coordinates: 47°45′00″N 27°34′35″E
- Country: Moldova
- District: Glodeni District

Government
  - Mayor: Iurie Nastas (PDM)

Population (2014 census)
  - Total: 2,015
- Time zone: UTC+2 (EET)
  - Summer (DST): UTC+3 (EEST)

Petrunea is a village in Glodeni District, Moldova.
