= Hlina =

- Village
- Location within Moldova
- Coordinates: 48.2911111111°N 26.8780555556°E
- Country: Moldova
- District: Briceni

Government
  - Mayor: Alexandru Marian (PDM)

Population (2014 census)
  - Total: 973
- Time zone: UTC+2 (EET)
  - Summer (DST): UTC+3 (EEST)

Hlina is a village in Briceni District, Moldova.
