= Sofia, Hîncești =

Sofia
- Village
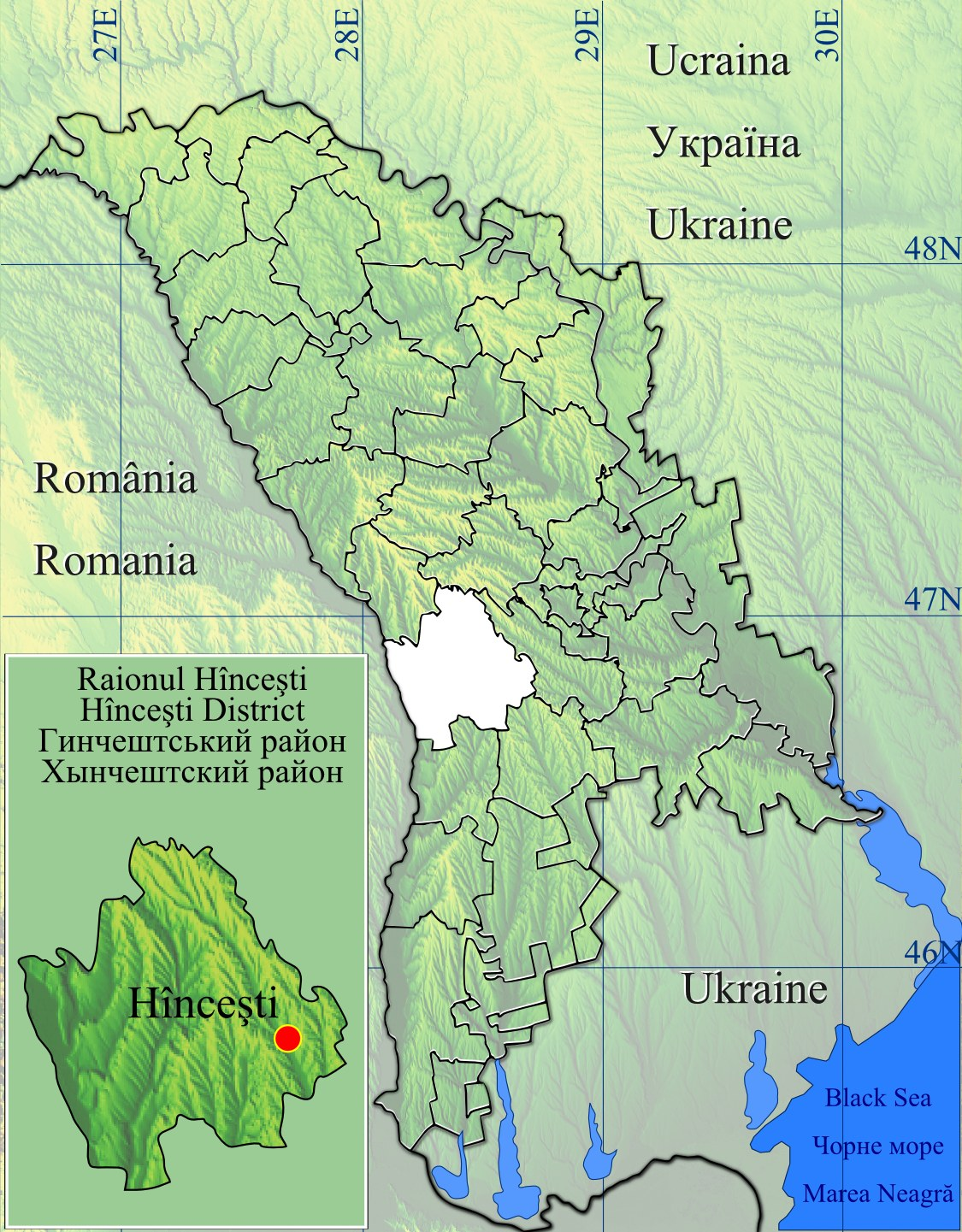
- Location within Hîncești
- Coordinates: 46°50′18″N 28°22′27″E
- Country: Moldova
- District: Hîncești District

Government
  - Mayor: Ion Mîrza (PDM)

Population (2014 census)
  - Total: 1,394
- Time zone: UTC+2 (EET)
  - Summer (DST): UTC+3 (EEST)
- Postal code: MD-3449

Sofia is a village in Hîncești District, Moldova.
