= Cajba =

- Commune
- Location within Moldova
- Coordinates: 47.7269444444°N 27.4397222222°E
- Country: Moldova
- District: Glodeni

Government
  - Mayor: Igor Macovei (PDM)

Population (2014 census)
  - Total: 1,451
- Time zone: UTC+2 (EET)
  - Summer (DST): UTC+3 (EEST)

Cajba is a village in Glodeni District, Moldova.
