= Obileni =

- Village
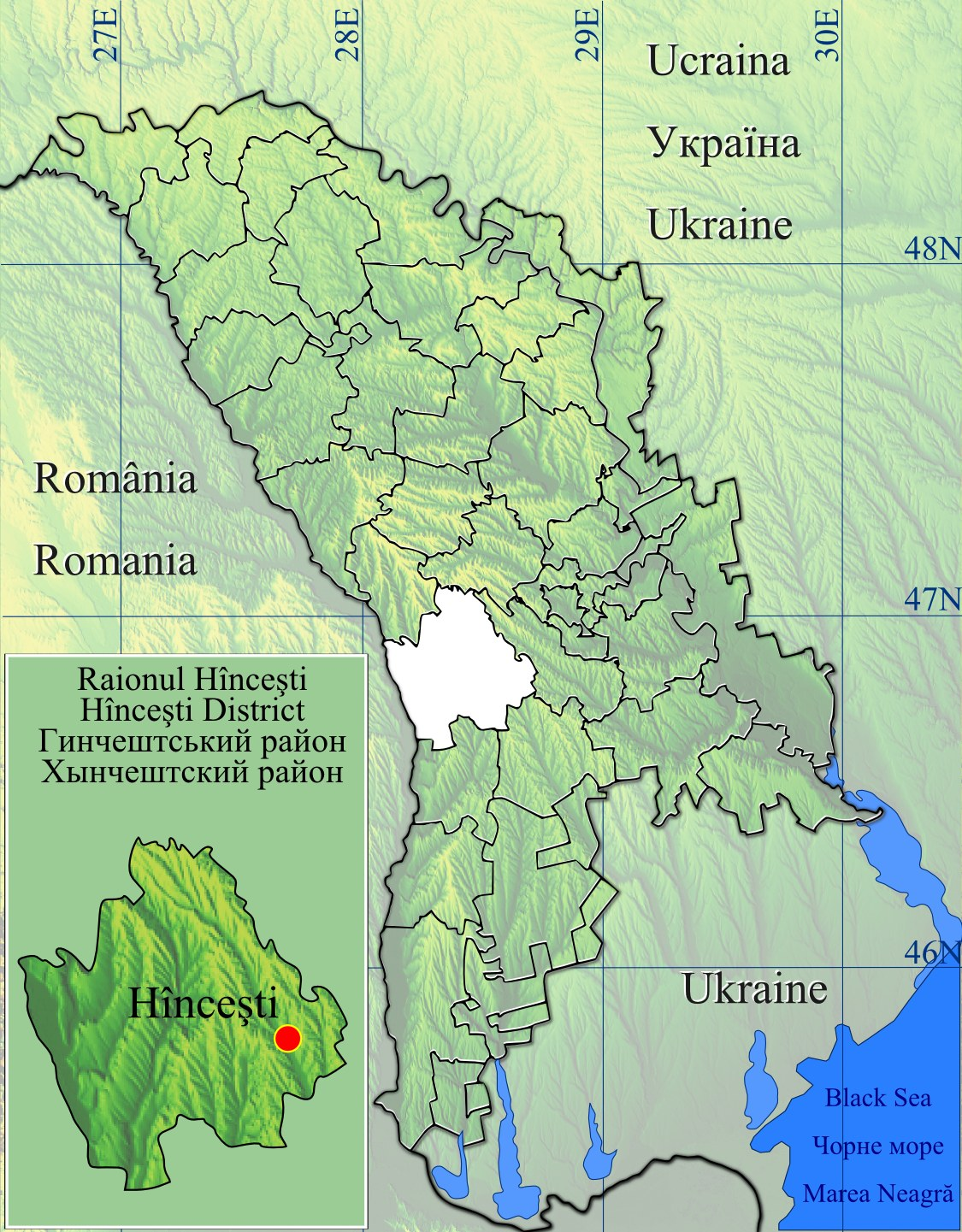
- Location within Hîncești
- Coordinates: 46°52′35″N 28°9′46″E
- Country: Moldova

Government
  - Mayor: Alexei Dimitriu (PLDM)

Population (2014 census)
  - Total: 1,443
- Time zone: UTC+2 (EET)
  - Summer (DST): UTC+3 (EEST)
- Postal code: MD-3440

Obileni is a village in Hîncești District, Moldova.
