= Mîrzești =

Mîrzeşti
- Commune
- Interactive map of Mîrzeşti
- Country: Moldova
- District: Orhei District

Population (2014)
  - Total: 1,184
- Time zone: UTC+2 (EET)
  - Summer (DST): UTC+3 (EEST)

Mîrzești is a commune in Orhei District, Moldova. It is composed of two villages, Mîrzaci and Mîrzești.
