= Musteața =

- Village
- Location within Moldova
- Coordinates: 47.51°N 27.65°E
- Country: Moldova
- District: Fălești District

Government
  - Mayor: Constantin Cuibari (PDM)

Population (2014 census)
  - Total: 1,387
- Time zone: UTC+2 (EET)
  - Summer (DST): UTC+3 (EEST)

Musteața is a village in Fălești, Moldova.
