= Coropceni =

- Village
- Location within Moldova
- Coordinates: 47.4758333333°N 28.5197222222°E
- Country: Moldova
- District: Telenești

Government
  - Mayor: Nicolae Badan (PLDM)

Population (2014 census)
  - Total: 1,334
- Time zone: UTC+2 (EET)
  - Summer (DST): UTC+3 (EEST)

Coropceni is a village in Telenești District, Moldova.
