= Negrea =

- Village
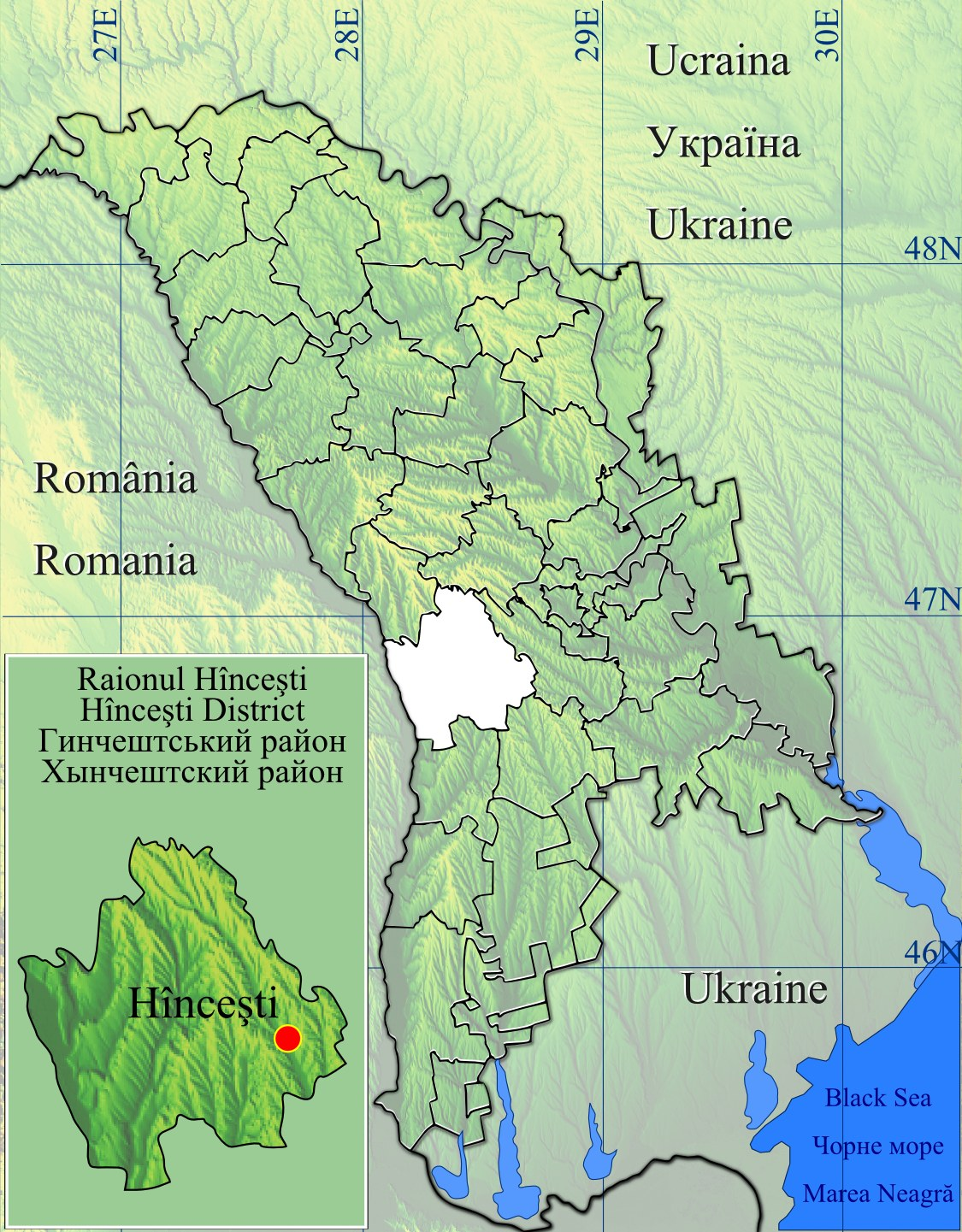
- Location within Hîncești
- Coordinates: 46°48′59″N 28°23′32″E
- Country: Moldova
- District: Hîncești District

Government
  - Mayor: Ștefan Mangîr (PDM)

Population (2014 census)
  - Total: 1,729
- Time zone: UTC+2 (EET)
  - Summer (DST): UTC+3 (EEST)
- Postal code: MD-3438

Negrea is a village in Hîncești District, Moldova.
