= Năpadova =

- Village
- Location within Moldova
- Coordinates: 48.019714°N 28.607407°E
- Country: Moldova
- District: Florești District

Government
  - Mayor: Valeriu Budnea (PDM)

Population (2014 census)
  - Total: 896
- Time zone: UTC+2 (EET)
  - Summer (DST): UTC+3 (EEST)

Năpadova is a village in Florești District, Moldova.
