= Topala =

- Village
- Location within Moldova
- Coordinates: 46.4608333333°N 28.675°E
- Country: Moldova
- District: Cimișlia

Government
  - Mayor: Gribinet Ivan (PDM)

Population (2014 census)
  - Total: 719
- Time zone: UTC+2 (EET)
  - Summer (DST): UTC+3 (EEST)

Topala is a village in Cimișlia District, Moldova.
