= Cigîrleni =

- Commune
- Cigîrleni as shown within the map of Moldova
- Coordinates: 46.7552°N 28.8227°E
- Country: Moldova
- District: Ialoveni
- Founded: 1569
- Elevation: 99 m (325 ft)

Population (2004)
  - Total: 2,393
- Time zone: UTC+2 (EET)
  - Summer (DST): UTC+3 (EEST)
- Postal code: MD-7715
- Prefix: 268
- ISO 3166 code: IL

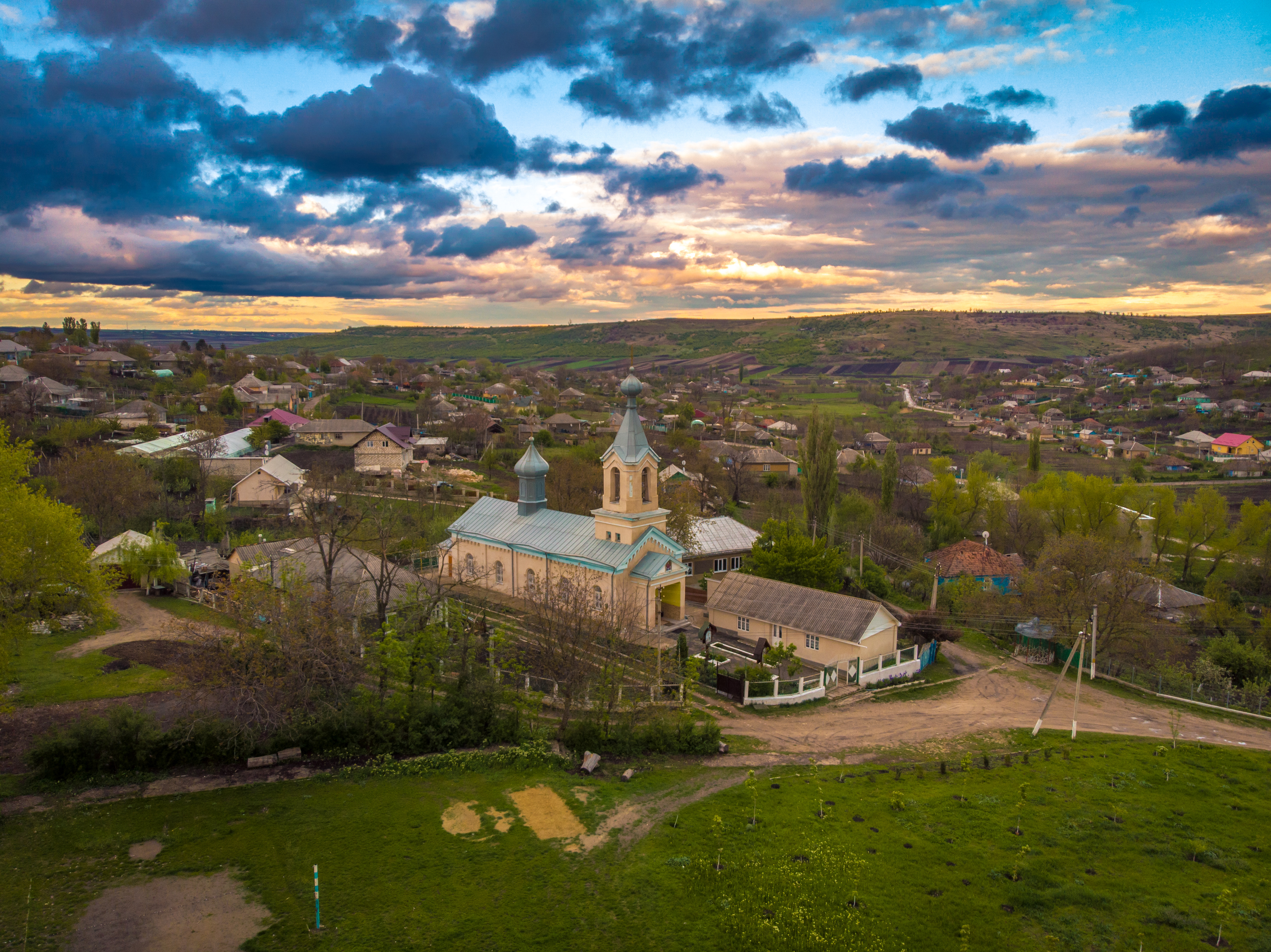
Cigîrleni Church, 2019

Cigîrleni is a village in Ialoveni District, Moldova.
