= Cățeleni =

- Village
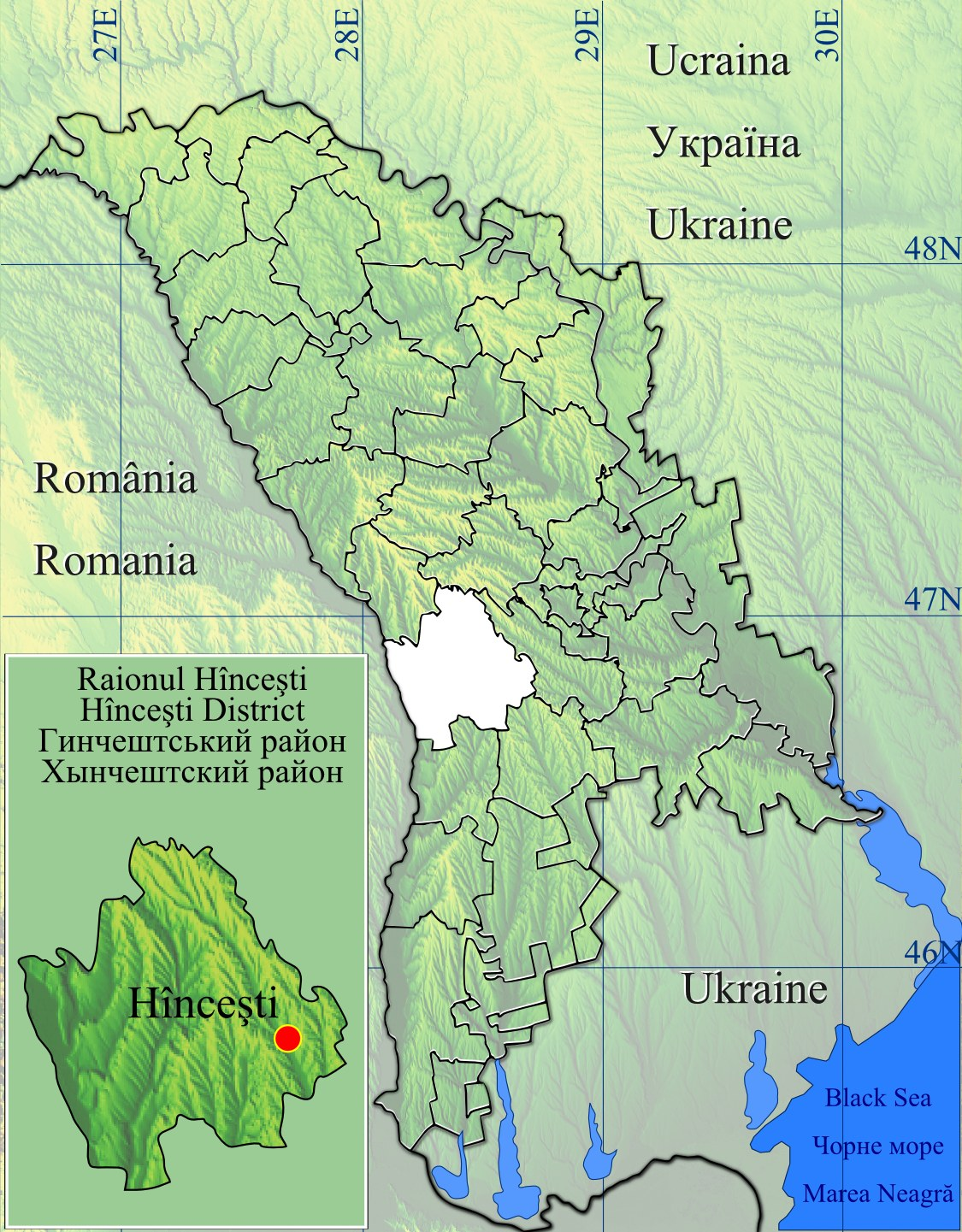
- Location within Hîncești
- Coordinates: 46°55′18″N 28°10′59″E
- Country: Moldova

Government
  - Mayor: Petru Cozlan (PCRM)

Area
  - Total: 4.07 km^{2} (1.57 sq mi)

Population (2014 census)
  - Total: 1,270
- Time zone: UTC+2 (EET)
  - Summer (DST): UTC+3 (EEST)
- Postal code: MD-6420

Cățeleni is a village in Hîncești District, Moldova.
