= Șamalia =

- Village
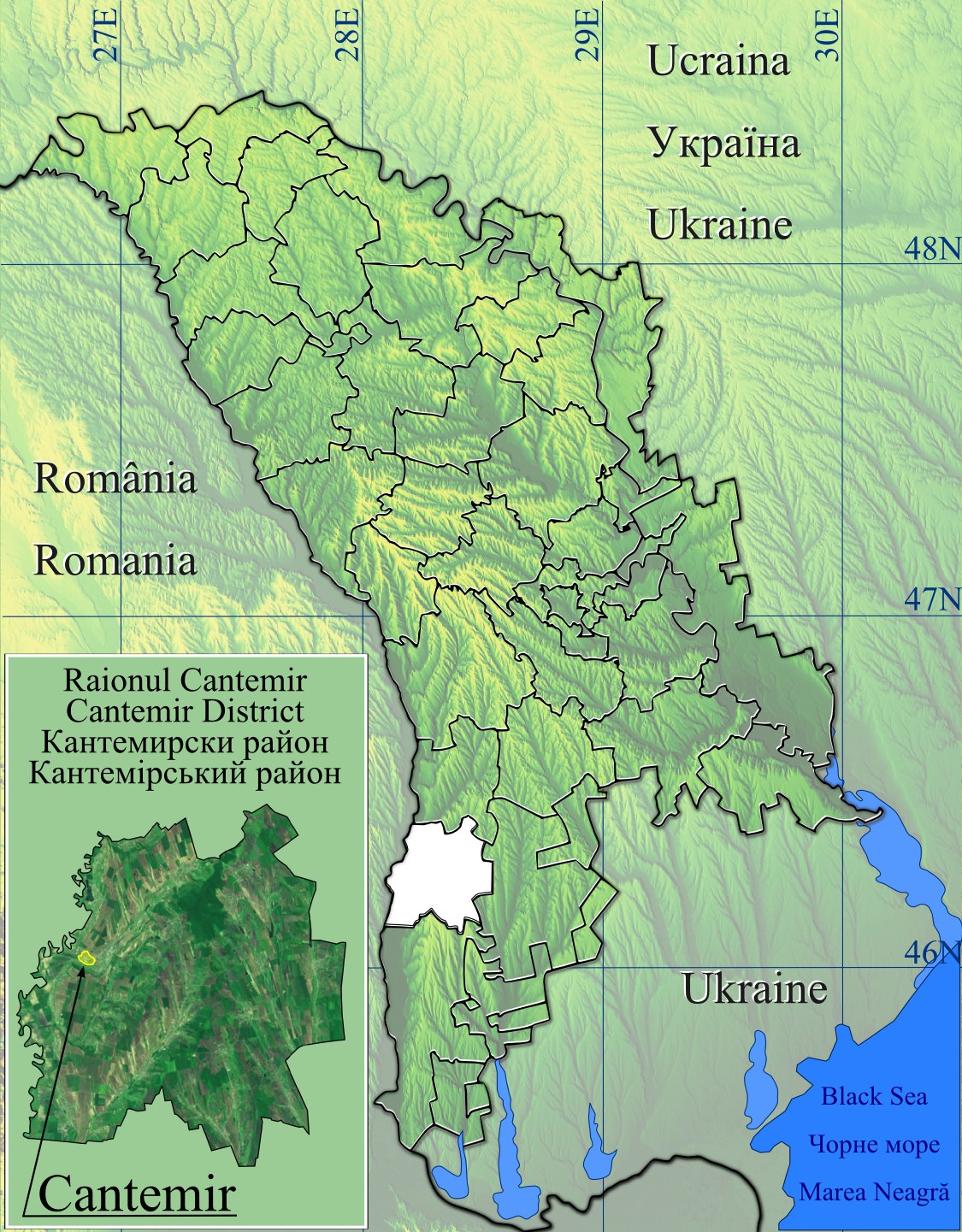
- Location within Cantemir
- Coordinates: 46°16′16″N 28°26′14″E
- Country: Moldova
- District: Cantemir District

Government
  - Mayor: Nicanor Sîrbu (PLDM)
- Elevation: 92 m (302 ft)

Population (2014 census)
  - Total: 765
- Time zone: UTC+2 (EET)
  - Summer (DST): UTC+3 (EEST)
- Postal code: MD-7336

Șamalia is a village in Cantemir District, Moldova.
