= Redi-Cereșnovăț =

- Village
- Location within Moldova
- Coordinates: 48.0633333333°N 28.3175°E
- Country: Moldova
- District: Soroca District

Government
  - Mayor: Larisa Gîncu (PLDM)

Population (2014 census)
  - Total: 811
- Time zone: UTC+2 (EET)
  - Summer (DST): UTC+3 (EEST)

Redi-Cereșnovăț is a village in Soroca District, Moldova. It is a rural village and municipality located in the Soroca District in northern Moldova. It lies about 10 kilometers from the city of Soroca and around 119 kilometers from the capital, Chișinău. The village is situated at approximately 48.06° north latitude and 28.31° east longitude, at an elevation of about 254 meters above sea level. The village had a population of about 811 people in the 2014 census, compared to around 959 people in 2004.
