= Șestac =

Șestaci
- Village
- Location within Moldova
- Coordinates: 47°51′22″N 28°45′23″E
- Country: Moldova
- District: Șoldănești District

Government
  - Mayor: Iacob Guja (PDM)

Population (2014 census)
  - Total: 1,072
- Time zone: UTC+2 (EET)
  - Summer (DST): UTC+3 (EEST)

Șestaci is a village in Șoldănești District, Moldova.
