= Cupcui =

Coordinates: 46°31′N 28°21′E

- Coordinates
- Country: Moldova
- District: Leova District

Population (2014 census)
  - Total: 1,540
- Postal code: MD-6318

Cupcui is a village in Leova District, Moldova.
