= Horodca =

- Village
- Location within Moldova
- Coordinates: 47.0455555556°N 28.4894444444°E
- Country: Moldova
- District: Ialoveni District

Government
  - Mayor: Ștefan Vlasî (BEPPEM)

Population (2014 census)
  - Total: 1,154
- Time zone: UTC+2 (EET)
  - Summer (DST): UTC+3 (EEST)
- Postal code: MD-6817

Horodca is a village in Ialoveni District, Moldova.
