= Taraclia de Salcie =

- Village
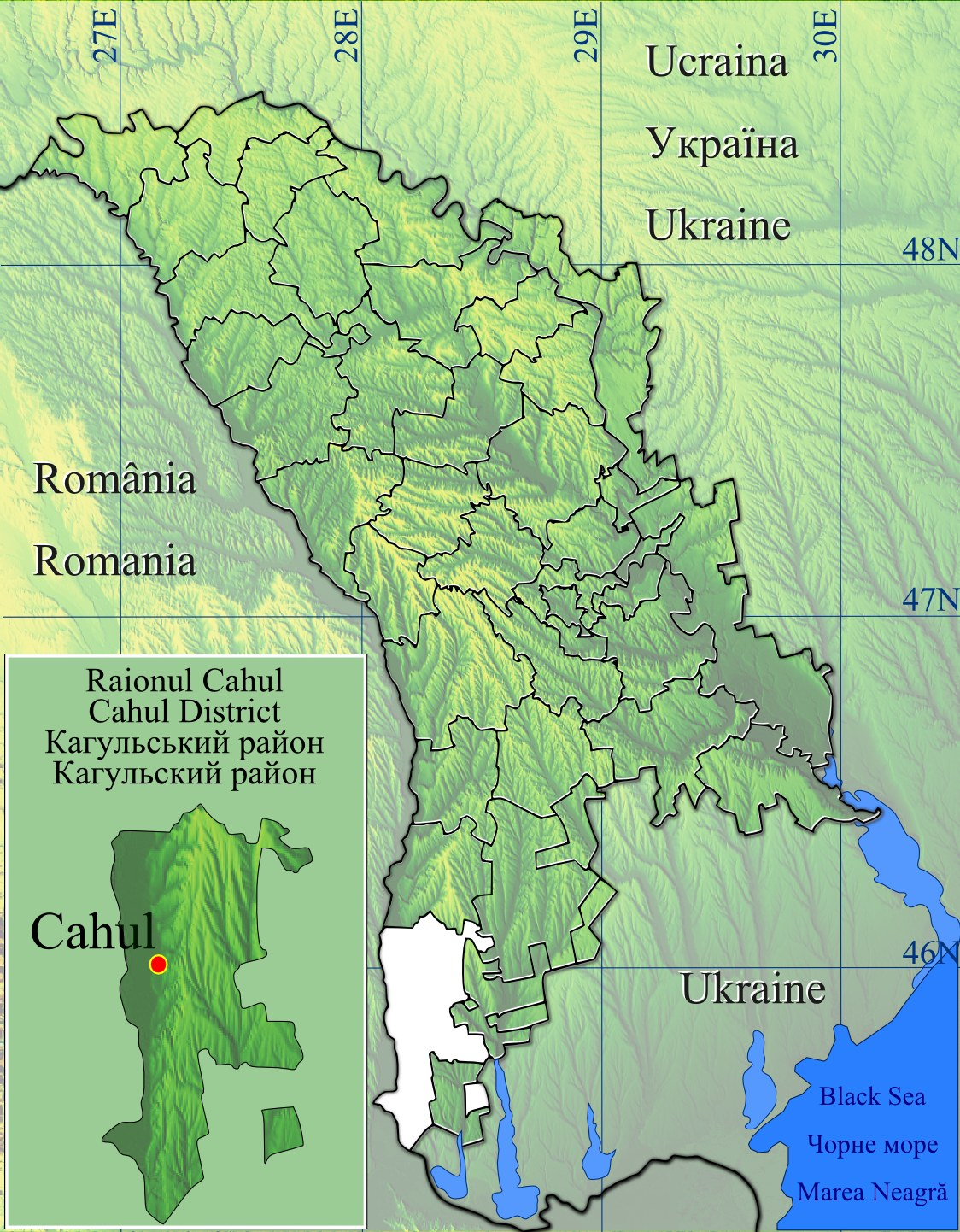
- Location within Cahul
- Coordinates: 46°00′29″N 28°25′07″E
- Country: Moldova

Government
  - Mayor: Mihail Vrabie (PLDM)

Population (2014 census)
  - Total: 1,523
- Time zone: UTC+2 (EET)
  - Summer (DST): UTC+3 (EEST)
- Postal code: MD-3929

Taraclia de Salcie is a village in Cahul District, Moldova.

== Geography ==
- District: Cahul
- Country: Moldova
- Approximate coordinates: around 46.0074 latitude, 28.4152 longitude
- Altitude: around 70–75 m

== History ==
- The village is documented around 1800
- Older historical references to nearby/related localities in southern Bessarabia
- Possible connection to the historic settlement patterns of southern Moldova/Bessarabia

== Population / Demographics ==
Census year	Population
2004	1,724
2014	1,523

Ethnic breakdown: 98.26% Moldovans, plus small Ukrainian, Russian, Gagauz, and Bulgarian minorities.

== Administration ==
- It is a commune/village in Cahul District
- Postal code: MD-3929
- Phone area code: +373 299
- Mayor / local council

== Religion and culture ==
- Orthodox parish / church

== Economy ==
The village has a rural profile, with local economic activity traditionally connected to agriculture.

== Education / institutions ==
- School / gymnasium
- Kindergarten
- Cultural house
- Library
- Medical point
- Town hall / primărie
