= Parcani, Șoldănești =

Parcani
- Village
- Location within Moldova
- Coordinates: 47°49′01″N 28°50′18″E
- Country: Moldova
- District: Șoldănești District

Government
  - Mayor: Valeriu Lopaci (PLDM)

Population (2014 census)
  - Total: 755
- Time zone: UTC+2 (EET)
  - Summer (DST): UTC+3 (EEST)
- Postal code: 7225
- Website: parcani.md

Parcani is a village in Șoldănești District, Moldova.
