= Schinoasa River =

Physical characteristics
- Source
  - location: Southern Moldova and South West Odessa Oblast
  - length: 53 Km
- Basin size: 343 km²

The Schinoasa River (Ukrainian: Скиноса) is a left affluent river of the Cogâlnic River that flows through southern Moldova and southwestern Odessa Oblast of Ukraine.

== Description ==
The Schinoasa River starts in the forests at the top of the Schinoasa valley and collects all the water that drains through the area. At first, the river flows toward the southeast, but it later turns to go south-southeast. It follows the valley until it gets close to the Cogâlnic River, right near the old German colony of Schinoasa.

== Ecology ==
In July 2012, an environmental cleanup of the river was organized in Satul Nou, Cimișlia District, led by 18-year-old local resident Mariana Bubuioc. Utilizing a budget of 1,200 lei and a team of 25 volunteers—with support from a rural youth program funded by the U.S. Embassy and local authorities—the initiative cleared accumulated waste from the river channel.

=== Waste Removing ===
On 17 July 2020, local youth organization members (#AdBJuniorSelemet) organized a community cleanup campaign focused on clearing waste and dry vegetation from the river channel in Sălcuța (or Selemet), inviting residents to help restore the local aquatic ecosystem.

== Archaeological findings ==
Recent archaeological research conducted in the vicinity of the Schinoasa River springs in the Cimișlia District has identified significant historical sites dating to the 4th century AD.

In the area east of Sagaidac and north of Suric, researchers discovered a settlement situated at the base of a hill at the confluence of two valleys, approximately 0.6 kilometers west of the Schinoasa river. Surface findings at this site included fragments of Roman amphorae and wheel-thrown pottery made from fine and coarse paste, characteristic of the Sântana de Mureș-Cerneahov culture associated with the Goths during the Migration Period (4th century AD).

Furthermore, evidence suggests a dual-horizon settlement in the western agricultural area of Sagaidac dating to the 3rd–4th centuries AD. Partial excavations carried out at this location in 2018 revealed over 40 pits and structural complexes attributed to the late Roman period.
