= 244th Rifle Division =

244th Rifle Division (June 29, 1941 – December 27, 1941) 244th Rifle Division (December 25, 1941 - June 13, 1942) 244th Rifle Division (June 30, 1942 – June 10, 1946)
- Active: 1941–1946
- Country: Soviet Union
- Branch: Red Army
- Type: Infantry
- Size: Division
- Engagements: Battle of Smolensk (1941); Operation Typhoon; Second Battle of Kharkov; Case Blue; Battle of Stalingrad; Operation Gallop; Third Battle of Kharkov; Donbas strategic offensive (August 1943); Battle of the Dniepr; Nikopol–Krivoi Rog Offensive; Odessa Offensive; First Jassy–Kishinev Offensive; Second Jassy–Kishinev Offensive
- Decorations: Order of the Red Banner (3rd Formation); Order of Suvorov (3rd Formation)
- Battle honours: Zaporizhzhia (3rd Formation)

Commanders
- Notable commanders: Maj. Gen. Nikolai Timofeevich Shcherbakov; Col. Ivan Aleksandrovich Istomin; Maj. Gen. Georgii Afanasevich Afanasev; Col. Georgii Ivanovich Kolyadin; Col. Pavel Trofimovich Sedin

The 244th Rifle Division was the second of a group of 10 regular rifle divisions formed from cadres of NKVD border and internal troops as standard Red Army rifle divisions, very shortly after the German invasion, in the Moscow Military District. It was largely based on what would become the shtat (table of organization and equipment) of July 29, 1941, with several variations. Initially assigned to the 31st Army, it was soon reassigned to 30th Army in Western Front northeast of Smolensk; under this command it took part in the first Dukhovshchina offensive against German 9th Army before being transferred to 19th Army in the third week of August for the second attempt to take this objective. After this failed the division went over to the defense at the boundary between the 19th and 30th Armies, where it was overwhelmed by 9th Army and 3rd Panzer Group at the outset of Operation Typhoon and soon destroyed.

A new 244th was formed in late December 1941 from the redesignation of a 400-series rifle division at Stalingrad and was moved west in March 1942 to join the 28th Army east of Kharkiv, eventually becoming part of Southwestern Front. It formed part of the northern shock group intended to liberate the city in May 1942, but was struck by a counterattack from the 3rd Panzer Division and fell apart; it was soon disbanded again.

The third formation of the 244th took place within weeks, also in Southwestern Front, and may have incorporated survivors of the second formation under new leadership. It was formed while the German summer offensive was already underway and barely escaped being disbanded for a third time. Instead, it was sent to the 57th Army of Southeastern Front south of Stalingrad, and helped to blunt the drive of 4th Panzer Army toward the city. It then fell back into the southern suburbs, and eventually the city itself, defending strongly until it was evacuated in October. What little remained was then pulled back to the Moscow area for yet another rebuilding before being assigned to 1st Guards Army for the last part of the winter counteroffensive. With most of Southwestern Front it pushed deep into eastern Ukraine before being struck by Army Group South's "backhand blow" in mid-February 1943, ending up partly encircled and nearly destroyed again. The 244th was rebuilt during the lull in operations in the spring and then joined in the offensives into the Donbas and toward the Dniepr in the summer and autumn as part of 66th Rifle Corps of 12th Army, winning a battle honor in the process. It would remain in this Corps for most of the rest of the war. When 12th Army was disbanded the division was moved to 6th Army and it won a pair of decorations during the winter and spring campaigns in southern Ukraine in 1944. When this Army was in turn disbanded the 244th joined 37th Army where it remained, with one brief exception, into the postwar. It took part in the August offensive into Moldavia and then advanced into Bulgaria where the 37th took up occupation duties for the duration of the war. In 1946 it was converted to a mechanized division which was disbanded in 1947.

== 1st Formation ==
The 244th Rifle Division first began forming within days of the start of the German invasion on June 29, 1941, at Dmitrov, in the Moscow Military District. This was based on an NKVD order of that date:

In accordance with a decision of the USSR's government, the NKVD of the USSR is charged with forming fifteen rifle divisions [10 regular and 5 mountain].
1. Lieutenant General I. I. Maslennikov is entrusted with the task of forming fifteen rifle divisions of NKVD forces...
3. Begin forming and deploying the [following] divisions immediately: 243rd Rifle Division, 244th Rifle Division, 246th Rifle Division, 247th Rifle Division, 249th Rifle Division, 250th Rifle Division, 251st Rifle Division, 252nd Rifle Division, 254th Rifle Division, 256th Rifle Division...
4. To form the divisions designated above, assign 1,000 soldiers and non-commissioned officers and 500 command cadre from the NKVD's cadre to each division. Request the Red Army General Staff to provide the remainder of personnel by calling up all categories of soldiers from the reserves.
5. Complete concentrating the NKVD cadre at the formation regions by 17 July 1941...

Although the initial order for its formation came from the NKVD, when it left for the front in early July it was completely under Red Army administration. Its order of battle was as follows:

- 907th Rifle Regiment
- 911th Rifle Regiment
- 913rd Rifle Regiment
- 776th Artillery Regiment
- 304th Antitank Battalion
- 523rd Antiaircraft Battalion
- 325th Reconnaissance Company
- 414th Sapper Battalion
- 666th Signal Battalion
- 264th Medical/Sanitation Battalion
- 245th Chemical Defense (Anti-gas) Company
- 467th Auto Transport Battalion
- 283rd Field Bakery
- 809th Field Postal Station
- 711th Field Office of the State Bank

Col. Nikolai Timofeevich Shcherbakov, an NKVD officer, was appointed to command, and would be promoted to the rank of major general on July 15. The division was assigned to the newly forming 31st Army on July 15 and officially entered the fighting front on July 20.

Judging from reports on other NKVD-based divisions, the 244th was far from complete when it entered combat. The commander of 30th Army, Maj. Gen. V. A. Khomenko, reported on August 5 regarding his 250th and 251st Divisions that they had been required to move up to 350 km on foot to their concentration areas and "were taken from their assembly points in the very midst of assembly, and, incomplete, they did not approach being 'knocked together' and went into battle unprepared for combat." In addition, the 251st had only about 400 NKVD cadre soldiers.

== Battle of Smolensk ==
The 31st Army, commanded by Maj. Gen. V. N. Dalmatov, was initially composed of four NKVD divisions, the 244th, 246th, 247th and 249th. On July 30 the Reserve Front was formed, under command of Army Gen. G. K. Zhukov, and the Army, which now also included the 119th Rifle Division, was assigned to it. It was given responsibility for a line from the Moscow Sea to Kniazhi Gory to Shiparevo and Shchuche, with its headquarters at Rzhev. By this time the bulk of the remnants of 16th and 20th Armies had emerged from semi-encirclement near Smolensk.

=== Dukhovshchina Offensives ===
Marshal S. K. Timoshenko, commander of Western Front, began planning for a renewed effort toward Smolensk on August 14 which was intended to recapture Dukhovshchina en route to the city. The STAVKA ordered this to be coordinated with Zhukov's Reserve Front on August 17 in order to engulf the entire front from Toropets in the north to Bryansk in the south. In the event, due to the chaotic situation, Timoshenko was forced to conduct the operation in piecemeal fashion and was unable to establish close cooperation with Zhukov. In preparation for this offensive General Khomenko was tasked with producing a plan for his 30th Army, in reply to which Timoshenko directed, in part, on August 16:

When it arrives in the Simonovo region early on 18 August, place 244th RD in reserve, echeloned behind 251st RD's right wing.

The division became part of 30th Army effective that date, while the offensive began 24 hours earlier. Timoshenko issued his first report on the operation to the STAVKA at about 1030 hours on August 17, in which his chief of staff reported:

244th RD is on the march, with its 907th RR sent on trucks at 1900 hours on 16 August, its horse-drawn echelon beginning its movement at 0130 hours on 17 August, and the 1st vehicular echelon of its main forces dispatched at 0800 hours. The division will be concentrated in the Simonovo region by the morning of 18 August.

In fact, even without taking the 244th into account, the 30th Army went over to the attack in piecemeal fashion, and due to intense machine gun, mortar and artillery fire in most sectors achieved only limited results, although the 107th Tank Division managed to make a 4 km-deep penetration against the 106th Infantry Division. At 1400 hours on August 18, Khomenko issued orders to General Shcherbakov directing that he prepare to operate from Karpovo, which had been taken by 107th Tanks the previous day, toward Dukhovshchina:

* Relieve 107th TD's 120th MRR [Motorized Rifle Regiment] along the Zhukovo, Sloboda, Nazemenki, and Karpovo line with one regiment [911th] of your division by 0400 hours on 19 August, and attack with the 120th, while delivering your division's main attack on the right wing [westward] toward Bol'shoe Repino, Novoselki, and Petrovo Selo, while protecting the left wing with small groups.
* 244th RD's boundaries are: on the right, with 251st RD - Krapivnia, Beskhvostovo, Krechets, and Dorofeevo; and on the left, with 166th RD - Shurkino, Markovo, and Berdino.
* The division will reconnoiter at the boundary between 30th Army and 19th Army's 166th RD.

During the day the division reached the Turinka region, 20–25 km south of Bely, at 0930 hours. Khomenko also reported to the Front that rain in the Army's sector, beginning at 1540 hours, was making road movement difficult, particularly for the 244th. Partly as a result of its failure to appear on August 19 the Army's remaining divisions stalled against heavy German resistance, although the 107th Tanks gained an additional 2 km to the eastern outskirts of Shelepy. In his report at 1330 Khomenko stated the division had concentrated its main forces in the Novo-Vysokoe region, 10–12 km east of Shelepy and one rifle regiment in the Sloboda and Torchilovo sector, and that its horse-drawn echelon was expected to arrive at 1800. The offensive continued on August 20 along the Shelepy axis, led by the 251st and 162nd Rifle Divisions, with the 244th and the 45th Cavalry Division "preparing to exploit success along the main axis". This was, in effect, papering over the fact that Shcherbakov still had not got his men and equipment in place to help lead the attack. Given this, the next day Timoshenko decided the division would be more usefully employed in reinforcing 19th Army to the south, which was continuing to make progress:

Transfer 244th RD to 19th Army to relieve 166th RD in the Markovo, Zanino and Hill 213.9 sector [28-40km north of Yartsevo] during the day on 21 August, and complete the relief, rifle and artillery battalion by battalion, by the morning of 22 August.
Lieutenant Colonel Baderko, 30th Army's chief of staff, is personally responsible for the timely dispatch of 244th RD to relieve 166th RD and for 244th and 166th RDs' timely occupation of their designated sectors, and 19th Army's chief of staff is responsible for them to be ready to attack on 22 August.

At this time the 166th was one of the formations conducting a successful defense against a counterblow by the 7th Panzer Division. As a relatively fresh division the 244th was given a large assignment for August 22: to protect 19th Army's right flank while also attacking with its main forces toward Zanino 2 and Isakovka to capture the Moseevka and Borniki line by day's end.

For August 23 the 244th, along with most of the rest of 19th Army, was directed to fulfil the missions assigned two days earlier. However, the previous day the 22nd Army, in the vicinity of Velikiye Luki to the north, came under attack from the 3rd Panzer Group, which had moved in that direction behind 9th Army over the previous days. The 22nd was soon in considerable trouble, and this would spell the end of the Dukhovshchina offensive. At 1700 hours it was reported that the division was defending the Shupeki, Zaria and Priglovo sector on the 19th Army's right wing while attacking unsuccessfully elsewhere, and later exchanging fire with German centers of resistance in the Kuchino, Shcherdina and Priglovo sector; it reported lossed of four men killed, 21 wounded with three horses killed and two wounded. In Western Front's operational summary issued at 2000 on August 24 the 244th's performance was stated as much the same as the day before, due to having "encountered fresh enemy reserves from the depths." By the evening Timoshenko understood that, without reinforcements, his most important shock groups had "shot their bolt."

Despite this, the division resumed its attack at 0800 hours on August 25 after a 30-minute artillery preparation, overcame intense mortar and artillery fire and captured Novo-Losevo as the defenders of 5th Infantry Division withdrew westward in the vicinity of Zanino 2. The 244th's mission for the following day was to destroy the German strongpoints in the Kuchina, Levashovo and Kazarina region, 26–30 km north of Yartsevo. In the event, it reached the western edge of the woods east of Novo-Losevo 1. It the course of this Shcherbakov reported the discovery of the booby-trapped corpses of 15 Red Army soldiers in the region north of Borniki. At 1350 the 45th Cavalry was committed to combat at the boundary between the 244th and 166th Divisions. On August 27 the 19th Army attacked at noon but encountered stubborn resistance; despite this, by 1700 the 244th captured Markovo, Kuchina, Levashova and Shakhlovo. Timoshenko ordered the offensive to continue on August 28 and now, led by the 45th Cavalry, the 244th and 166th succeeded in taking 35th Infantry Division's strongpoint at Shakhlovo on the upper Loinia River. The 244th conducted operations overnight and by 1700 it was attacking Hill 240.1 and the eastern edge of the grove west of Shakhlovo. Its mission for August 29 was, with the support of the 1st Battalion of the 399th Howitzer Artillery Regiment, to penetrate the German defenses in the Novaia Kazarina and Novoselishche sector by conducting its main attack toward Hill 227.4. Following this, the division, in common with the rest of Western Front, was to regroup and make preparations to return to the general offensive on September 1.

==== Second Offensive ====
19th Army was specifically directed to develop its offensive to capture Dukhovshchina and subsequently capture the Smolensk region by an attack toward the southwest without attacking the city frontally. This was to begin no later than September 3. On the 19th Army front the 244th was one of five rifle divisions in the first echelon, along with the 101st Tank Division. It was flanked on the right by 30th Army's 251st Division. In his orders for September 2 the Army commander, Lt. Gen. I. S. Konev, directed the 244th to continue its attacks to fulfil the mission assigned two days earlier as it had failed to make any progress. By late afternoon he reported that the division, together with the 166th, 89th and 50th Rifle Divisions, had failed to advance due to strong fire resistance. Konev continued to urge these divisions forward on September 3 without significant results. The 244th's losses on the previous day were noted as 13 killed and 75 wounded, while it claimed as trophies 210 rifles, three heavy machine guns, eight light machine guns, three mortars, three bicycles, 131 gas masks, and 8,500 rounds of ammunition.

The division's orders for September 4 were to protect the Army's right flank, penetrate the German defenses in the Hill 229.7 and Novoselishche sector, capture Staraia Kazarina and Krotovo, and subsequently attack toward Kiseleva. The Front's summary to the STAVKA issued at 2000 hours stated that the 244th, along with the rest of the Army's rifle divisions, attacked unsuccessfully and were fighting in their previous positions. For the following day Timoshenko bowed to reality and ordered the 30th and 20th Armies to go over to the defense, while the 244th, adjacent to the 30th, also drew a defensive assignment, which continued into September 6–11. By the end of this period it was digging in along the Voskresensk, Panovo and Shakhlovo line.

=== Operation Typhoon ===
As of September 10 the division was significantly weakened, with 6,984 personnel on strength, while the 19th Army as a whole had 68,997 in total out of an authorized 109,048. The front west of Moscow was generally quiet through the balance of September as Army Groups Center and South focused on the encirclement and destruction of Southwestern Front east of Kyiv. On October 1, the eve of the renewed German offensive on the Soviet capital, the STAVKA believed the main German attack would come along the Smolensk–Vyazma highway; in fact it would be aimed at the 19th/30th Army boundary. On this crucial sector, which would soon be struck by 3rd Panzer Group, the 244th was defending a sector that was 13 km wide. It had 18 45mm antitank guns, 23 76mm guns (including regimental guns) and eight 122mm howitzers, fewer than four guns per kilometre. In addition, it had a total of only 700 metres of barbed wire and 550 land mines in front of its forward zone, although an additional 627 antitank mines were intended to be dug in during the fighting along likely routes of German tank movement.

The German command had concentrated eight divisions on a 16 km front opposite the 162nd and 242nd Rifle Divisions of 30th Army and the adjacent 244th. Konev had moved to command of Western Front and 19th Army was now led by Lt. Gen. M. F. Lukin. Operation Typhoon began at 0530 hours on October 2 with preparatory air strikes and artillery strikes across the entire Front sector. After 45 minutes the ground attack began, including a large number of tanks, which was unexpected on this sector due to the absence of good roads. In order to outflank the fairly compact deployment of the 162nd the German forces took advantage of the weak defense of the overextended 911th Rifle Regiment. Within three hours some units of the 162nd and 242nd were encircled. At 1435 hours up to 40 German tanks were detected 14–15 km behind the Soviet front line, and a 1.5 km-wide gap between the 162nd and the 244th was being covered by only a single platoon of the 325th Reconnaissance Company. Lukin had concentrated his main strength on his left wing and the 244th had no support beyond its own resources. Shcherbakov in turn had concentrated on his left flank where the terrain was more suitable for tanks. This left the 911th Regiment, with just two battalions (the 3rd Battalion was in support of the 91st Rifle Division), defending 9 km of marshy ground backed by one battalion of the 776th Artillery Regiment. The first line was soon overrun, the 913th Regiment was outflanked and cut off, and the 907th attempted to come to its aid. Its counterattack, led by its commander, Lt. Col. M. Ya. Usanov, closed the gap with the 913th but Usanov was killed in action. At 1825 a German force of two battalions and 15 tanks managed to split the division's combat position in two. The remnants of the 911th were hurled back to the northeast and continued fighting in the area of Sergeevka. The bulk of the division, under pressure from superior forces, fell back to the east, where they became threatened with encirclement.

At the end of the day Lukin issued Operational Summary No. 063 which stated in part:

4. The 244th Rifle Division on the night before 3.10 is to withdraw its units and to defend the sector Pogorelitsy–Ust'e (along the Votria River), to prevent a breakthrough... special attention is to be paid to covering the gap between foci of resistance with flanking machine-gun fire...

On October 3 General Shcherbakov was removed from his command by the 19th Army's military council for his "inability to command troops in a retreat." He escaped the encirclement and later served as commander of a ski brigade and then the 324th Rifle Division for a few months in 1942 before being moved to the training establishment. He died of illness in 1944. His chief of staff, Lt. Col. Ivan Danilovich Krasnoshtanov, took over the 244nd but was himself wounded and evacuated on October 5. He would later lead the 139th and 238th Rifle Divisions and became a lieutenant general in 1954. Given the chaos within the developing Vyazma pocket the subsequent leadership of the 1st formation remains obscure.

By the evening of October 3 conditions on the right flank of 19th Army had deteriorated, with German units forcing a crossing of the Vop River. At 0105 hours on October 4 Lukin issued an order for a counterattack at noon, but notably this did not include the 244th because it had been completely driven from its original defense sector. In the event, the plan was postponed until October 5; during that evening the 19th Army operational summary noted that the 244th had been reduced to a composite unit of roughly 250 men still clinging to their positions. The next day Lukin reported to Western Front that "The forward depot of the 19th Army is completely out of ammunition. The situation is catastrophic. I request immediate resupply, especially of artillery shells." Soon after, the armies of Western Front finally got permission to retreat. Lukin designated the 89th and 244th, both barely remnants, plus the 127th Tank Brigade, as the Army reserve. On the morning of October 7 the encirclement finally closed east of Vyazma. That evening the commander of 20th Army reported that up to 700 men of the division had assembled in the area of Selo Station prior to crossing the Vopets River.

Lukin re-established communication with the Front on October 9, and stated that he was withdrawing in two groups, with the 244th as part of his left-hand group. He also mentioned that the division was badly depleted, with not more than 300 "bayonets" (riflemen and sappers) still in the fight. They were intended to attack toward Obukhovo and Kishkino, but 19th Army faced a solid ring of German forces and the effort was a failure. A further effort on the morning of October 12 at Bogoroditskoe was no more successful, after which Western Front signalled that the supply trains and heavy weapons were to be destroyed. The next attempt to break out jointly with 20th Army was aimed southward at the area of Stogovo with the 244th on the left-hand route. It began at 1800 hours but during the next day the encircled forces were split apart. Only small groups of men were able to filter through the German lines over the following days and weeks. As was the case with most of the divisions destroyed in the Vyazma and Bryansk encirclements the 244th remained on the books of the Red Army until being officially written off on December 27.

== 2nd Formation ==
A new 244th was created on December 25 at Stalingrad from the barely-formed 469th Rifle Division, which had begun organizing in the Transcaucasian Military District. It had a notably middle-aged cadre, with 10 percent combat veterans and 90 percent new recruits from the 1900 year group, making them roughly 42 years old. Its order of battle was essentially the same as that of the 1st formation. Col. Ivan Aleksandrovich Istomin was in command of the 2nd formation throughout its existence.

=== Second Battle of Kharkiv ===
After a few months of equipping and training in the Stalingrad Military District the division was moved west in March 1942 to enter the Reserve of the Supreme High Command, and then joined the 28th Army in Southwestern Front in April. This Army, under command of Lt. Gen. D. I. Ryabyshev, also contained the 13th Guards, 38th, 162nd, 169th, and 175th Rifle Divisions, plus a cavalry corps and four tank brigades.

Marshal Timoshenko, who now commanded Southwestern Front, planned a new offensive to liberate Kharkiv with two shock groups. 28th Army formed the center of the northern group, with 21st Army to its north and 38th Army to its south. Ryabyshev's Army, located northeast of the city and with the bulk of the armor support, was expected to lead the advance. The offensive opened at 0630 hours on May 12 with a 60-minute artillery preparation, followed by a 15-20 minute air attack against front line strongpoints and artillery positions. The infantry and tanks went over to the attack at 0730, but many German positions remained intact. The 244th's initial objective was the village of Nepokrytoe, which was held by elements of the 513th Regiment of the 294th Infantry Division. In the event, 28th Army gained only 2–4 km in heavy fighting through the day and German forces continued to hold Varvarovka and Ternovaya, hindering the development of the offensive.

Overnight, the commander of Army Group South released the 23rd Panzer Division plus two infantry divisions to its 6th Army to join the depleted 3rd Panzer Division as a counterattack force. When combat resumed on the morning of May 13 Ryabyshev decided to develop the offensive on his left flank, taking advantage of the gains made by 38th Army the day before. The 13th Guards and 244th, backed by the 57th and 90th Tank Brigades, advanced 6 km toward Petrovskoe; Istomin's troops took over responsibility for the Peremoga sector, which had been gained by 13th Guards, and seized Hill 207 to secure the Guards' right flank. By the middle of the day the combined Soviet force had carved out a deep salient threatening Kharkiv, but disconcerting intelligence reports were reaching Ryabyshev about large concentrations of German armor and infantry massing east of the city. Early in the afternoon the German grouping struck 38th Army, and 13th Guards was ordered to form a defense facing south.

Despite the growing crisis on his left flank, Ryabyshev urged his divisions onward on May 14. The 244th, with the 34th Guards Rifle Regiment attached, renewed the assault following a brief artillery preparation. Almost immediately the attackers were struck by waves of up to 50 German bombers. With no antiaircraft artillery or air cover of their own the Soviet troops continued their attack despite growing losses and finally took Petrovskoe after an advance of another 6–8 km, reaching the approaches to the German rear defense line along the Kharkiv River. At the same time the remainder of the 13th Guards was caught up in the German counterattack against 38th Army, led by battlegroups of 3rd Panzer. When the day ended the Guards still held most of their positions, but at the cost of as much as a third of their strength, rendering the left wing of 28th Army incapable of further offensive action.

After some hesitation overnight in the German command, its counterattack proceeded on May 15. A grouping consisting of an infantry regiment and 40 tanks struck from the Nepokrytaia region against the boundary of the 28th and 38th Armies and advanced northeastward toward Peremoga and Ternovaya. One regiment of the 244th was driven back 10 km in what can only be termed a rout, finally taking up new positions 2–3 km southwest of Ternovaya; a second regiment abandoned Veseloe and then rallied to hold the hills north of the town. The third regiment was encircled southwest of the town. Over the night of May 15/16 Istomin consolidated the remnants of his division along the line of hills north, northeast, and east of Veseloe. His division had been effectively smashed by 3rd Panzer, which had driven deeply into its rear. This defeat also exposed the left flank of the 169th Division. When the day ended the 169th and the rest of 28th Army was desperately scraping up units to defend the yawning gap once held by the 244th. On May 16 the encircled regiment was destroyed by 3rd Panzer.

Over the following days efforts were made to revive the offensive of the northern shock group, including an order from Timoshenko on May 17 that the 244th was to attack to the southwest. By this time the southern shock group, and indeed all the Soviet forces in the Izyum salient, were in danger of encirclement and destruction, and the order had no actual effect. The division by this time was so reduced that it was officially disbanded on June 13.

== 3rd Formation ==
A new 244th was formed in Southwestern Front on June 30. According to Charles C. Sharp:

It is tempting to think that this was simply the same division being rebuilt, except that the earlier division was officially disbanded by the Soviet general staff and this division was formed with an entirely new commander. No doubt some unidentified reserve formation was quickly renumbered to "form" this unit, and it is likely that some survivors of the earlier 244th were incorporated into it.

When completed its order of battle was as follows:

- 907th Rifle Regiment
- 911th Rifle Regiment
- 913rd Rifle Regiment (later 914th)
- 776th Artillery Regiment
- 304th Antitank Battalion
- 169th Mortar Battalion
- 78th Antiaircraft Battery
- 325th Reconnaissance Company
- 414th Sapper Battalion
- 666th Signal Battalion (later 484th, 47th Signal Companies)
- 264th Medical/Sanitation Battalion
- 245th Chemical Defense (Anti-gas) Company (later 243rd)
- 62nd Auto Transport Company (later 467th)
- 468th Field Bakery
- 933rd Divisional Veterinary Hospital
- 1684th Field Postal Station
- 1110th Field Office of the State Bank

Col. Georgii Afanasevich Afanasev was appointed to command the day the division formed. He had previously led the 297th Rifle Division and would be promoted to the rank of major general on September 1, 1943. It was directly under command of Southwestern Front.

=== Case Blue ===
The main German summer offensive had already begun on June 28. The damaged 28th Army was defending west of the Oskil River from Volokonovka southward to Valuyki with five rifle divisions and three tank brigades; the 244th was acting as the Front reserve north of the latter place. Beginning on July 6 the XVII Army Corps and XXXX Panzer Corps of 6th Army scattered the 28th Army and encircled most of 38th Army to its south. This Army formed a combat group that was eventually able to withdraw north of the Don River, while much of the rest of the two Armies was trapped between the Aidar and the Chertkovo Rivers. German intelligence identified the 244th as part of the "bag", but sufficient men and equipment escaped that the division was not disbanded.

== Battle of Stalingrad ==
After this near disaster the division was moved by August 1 to the reserves of the newly formed Stalingrad Front. On August 4 this Front was split, and the 244th joined 57th Army in the new Southeastern Front. This Front, under command of Col. Gen. A. I. Yeryomenko, assigned the following mission to the Army on August 12:

57th Army... will firmly defend the 70-kilometre-wide sector from State Farm No. 4 (4 kilometres east of Tinguta) and State Farm "Privolzhskii" to Raigorod and prevent the enemy from penetrating to Stalingrad from the south.

The Army had three Guards divisions, the 244th, the 422nd Rifle Division en route, the 6th Tank Brigade with 19 tanks, an infantry school regiment, a cavalry regiment, and the 76th Fortified Region under command.

After several days of delays due to supply issues, the 4th Panzer Army of Army Group B struck the defenses of 64th Army at and east of Abganerovo at 0700 hours on August 20, but this faltered due to heavy resistance and ground conditions. The next day, the German force tried to renew its offensive by driving a wedge between the 64th and 57th Armies. 15th Guards Rifle Division, holding the 57th Army flank, was reinforced by the 422nd, and between them fought the 24th Panzer Division to a standstill short of Tundutovo Station; the Red Army General Staff report claimed 60 enemy tanks destroyed by units of the 57th Army that day. On August 23–24, 4th Panzer Army again regrouped, lunging northwards early on the 25th along the boundary of the 422nd and the 244th and advancing 8 km to the Chervlennaia River. Once there, however, concentrated artillery and mortar fire of the two divisions, joined by 15th Guards, separated the German tanks from their infantry, while heavy antitank fire and counterattacks by 6th Tank Brigade destroyed or damaged many panzers. The remainder had no choice but to fall back to their jumping-off positions by the end of August 26.

=== Into the Suburbs ===
Within days the 244th was transferred to 64th Army, but as the city was finally cut off on September 2 the division, as well as its supporting 20th Destroyer (Antitank) Brigade, was reassigned to Lt. Gen. A. I. Lopatin's 62nd Army within the city itself. Before dawn the next day Lopatin ordered Afanasev to take up positions in the bulging sector currently held by the 33rd Guards and 196th Rifle Divisions southeast of the hospital and Opytnaya Station, with one rifle regiment north of the Tsaritsa River and two regiments to the south. Once in place the 244th, supported on the right by the 42nd Rifle Brigade, 26th Tank Brigade, and 38th Motorized Rifle Brigade, was to defend its sector stoutly and also organize a counterattack toward the north and west. Within hours, however, the LI Army Corps resumed its assaults, disrupting this plan.

The German Corps intended to capture Gumrak Station and Gorodishche north of the Tsaritsa before entering the city proper and seizing Mamayev Kurgan and Railroad Station No. 1. The attack made good progress against the 33rd Guards and 196th, but Lopatin persisted in plans for a counterattack with the 244th on September 4, now to contain any attempt by 71st Infantry Division to lunge eastward down the Tsaritsa valley. This went in against its 191st Infantry Regiment on September 5 but made negligible gains, although Lopatin claimed otherwise. At the same time, a massive assault by Stalingrad Front against the northern German corridor to the city near Kotluban delayed further offensive efforts by LI Corps for two days.

When the advance resumed on September 7, Afanasev's northern regiment helped to repel several assaults by the 71st eastward from Opytnaya Station, containing the drive at Sadovaya and Razgulaevka Stations, only 8–10 km northeast of Mamayev Kurgan. At the same time the XXXXVIII Panzer Corps made limited attacks south of the Tsaritsa and the main forces of the 244th held firmly east of Poliakhovka. The next day the 71st pushed the remnants of the 87th Rifle Division, the 42nd Brigade, and the northern regiment of the 244th back to the vicinity of the hospital and a motor tractor station north of the Tsaritsa. Meanwhile, the 24th Panzers assaulted the defenses of the division's main force from the Tsaritsa southward through Sadovaya Station to the northern outskirts of Minina suburb. While barely managing to contain furious attacks by a battlegroup of the 24th, Afanasev saw two of his battalions destroyed to the last man in heavy fighting northwest of Minina. By day's end a distraught Lopatin directed the 10th Rifle Brigade to shore up the division's defenses. On September 9 the 71st Division pressed eastward and southeastward between the hospital and the Tsaritsa but made only marginal gains against the 42nd Brigade and the 244th's northern regiment, at considerable cost. South of the river the 24th Panzer, with only 24 tanks still operational, captured Sadovaya Station and held it against repeated counterattacks by the 244th and the 10th Brigade.

As of September 11 the division had 3,685 men on strength, making it one of the stronger formations in 62nd Army. Late that day the 24th Panzer, now with just 14 tanks, was relieved by the 94th Infantry Division. At 1000 hours on September 12, Lt. Gen. V. I. Chuikov officially took over command of the Army. That day the battle for the Stalingrad suburbs reached its climax. LI Corps deployed abreast from Gorodishche to the Tsaritsa and advanced slowly eastward, pushing toward the downtown. South of the Tsaritsa the 94th Infantry, with elements of XXXXVIII Panzers, also struck eastward against the main body of the 244th, the 10th Brigade, a regiment of the 10th NKVD Rifle Division, and the 35th Guards Rifle Division. By nightfall the German forces were in possession of most of the high ground west and southwest of the city and were in position to push into the central core.

=== Into the City ===
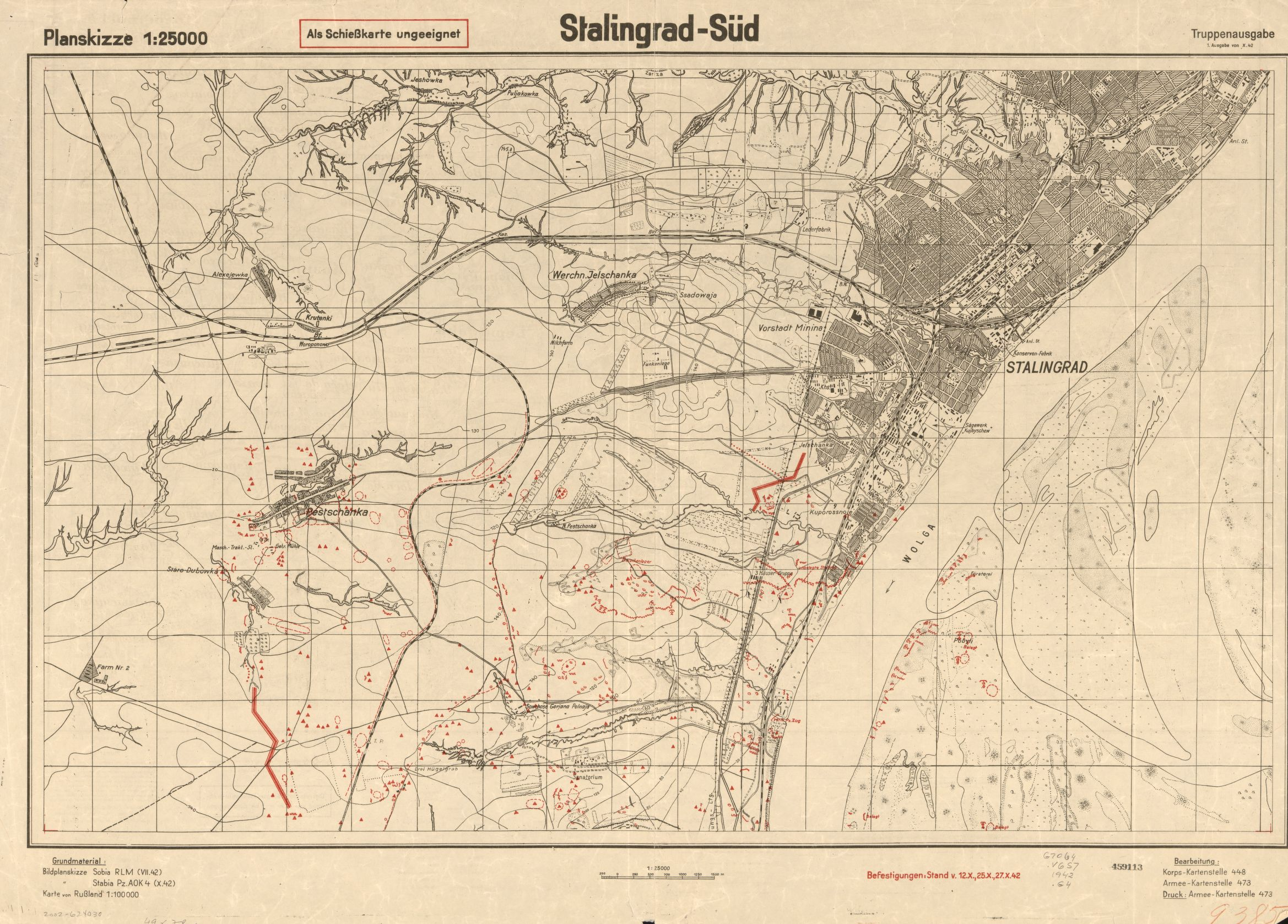
1942 German map of Stalingrad showing Minina and the Tsaritsa River

The German offensive continued on September 13. The main body of 244th was again attacked by 24th Panzer while the northern regiment faced the 71st Infantry. It was preceded by an intense artillery bombardment, accompanied by heavy air strikes. 62nd Army countered this to some extent with artillery fire from the east bank of the Volga. Due to this defensive support the German shock groups recorded only limited gains. The 71st compressed the defenses of the 244th's northern regiment southward toward the Tsaritsa, while the 24th Panzer and 94th Infantry made meagre progress south of the river. Late that evening, Yeryomenko ordered Chuikov to mount counterattacks to eliminate the German penetrations. The left wing of the 244th was to drive toward Sadovaya Station at 0330 hours on September 14 but ran into the face of the German forces preparing their own attacks; nevertheless the audacity of the counterstroke took the 71st Infantry off stride. 62nd Army later reported:

244th RD, 10th RB, 271st Regiment NKVD, and 35th Gds. RD continued to hold their occupied positions up to 1400 hours. An attack by the enemy toward Kuporosnoe at 1400 hours is being repelled. Wire communications with the units has been disrupted, and information about the changing situation has not arrived.

After the 191st Infantry Regiment demolished the left wing defenses of 42nd Brigade it forced that unit and the northern regiment of the 244th to withdraw to the east and the south, respectively, while the lead elements of the 194th Infantry Regiment, with armor support, raced down the heights west of the city's center, penetrated into the city's streets, and reached Stalingrad's central railroad station at about noon.

Overnight, the first two regiments of the 13th Guards Division crossed the Volga into the city center. At 0330 hours on September 15 the reinforced 24th Panzer began a drive into the heart of southern Stalingrad city. It struck due eastward along and north of the railroad line into southern Stalingrad, leaving a battlegroup based on the 21st Panzergrenadier Regiment to mop up bypassed Soviet forces of 42nd Brigade and the 244th. The panzers and their supporting infantry took Railroad Station No. 2 at 1600 before making a fast dash to the railroad bridge over the Tsaritsa at 1615, squarely in the rear of the main body of the 244th. The 24th Panzer, considerably strung out, formed a series of all-round defense positions for the night. With their defenses in shambles, all the forces defending on 62nd Army's left wing conducted an often disorganized fighting withdrawal eastward into the southern section of Stalingrad. The Army's evening report stated that the 244th had suffered heavy losses while withdrawing its left wing to the western outskirts of Minina. The gaps between the German positions did offer the opportunity to slip through and take up new positions as did the division, along with the 10th and 42nd Brigades, around the barracks area west of the southern part of the city.

On September 16 the division was reported as "fighting along the line [of] the southern bank of the Tsaritsa (2km southeast of the Opytnaia Station State Farm)–the road on the western outskirts of Stalingrad, leading from Verkhniaia Elshanka." In these positions, which were mostly separate strongpoints, it held out along with the remnants of several other units while waitimg for the arrival of the fresh 92nd Naval Rifle Brigade from across the Volga. The 24th Panzer had attacked shortly after dawn and pushed northward along the railroad, seizing a foothold across the Tsaritsa. Other elements of the division, including the 4th Motorcycle Battalion, moved northward against the bypassed groups of the 244th and the 10th Brigade on Barracks Hill; this position fell during the afternoon and left the division enveloped from the left.

The battle for southern Stalingrad culminated on September 17. Advancing northwestward from the main railroad line shortly after dawn the 1st and 2nd Battalions of the 26th Panzergrenadier Regiment had by 1120 hours cleared elements of the 244th and 42nd Brigade from the maze of streets west of the railroad and south of the Tsaritsa. On their left, 4th Motorcycle and other forces swept north from the barracks region, pressing the bypassed elements of the division and brigade north and east again. By day's end the remnants of the two Soviet units were left with only the narrow sector north of the bridge through which they could pass to reach the relative safety of 13th Guards' defenses in the center city.

Despite the successes of XXXXVIII Panzer Corps during September 16 and 17 the struggle in the southern section of the city was prolonged as Soviet forces simply refused to give up. By the evening of the next day the 244th was reported as occupying defenses along the railroad from Turgenevskaya to Liteinaya Streets, 400-800m northeast of the railroad bridge. Prior to this the division's remnants had been combined with those of 42nd Brigade to create a combined force of some several hundred men under the command of Col. M. S. Batrakov, the commander of the 42nd. They escaped the closing pincers of the 24th Panzer and 71st Infantry by infiltrating along both bank of the Tsaritsa. After reaching Turgenevskaya they were reinforced by some NKVD troops and local militia and managed to slow the German advance toward the Volga. Farther south, in the strip of land between the railroad and the Volga, the 92nd Brigade, with remnants of 10th Brigade, 133rd Tank Brigade, and 271st NKVD Regiment, reinforced by stragglers of the 42nd and 244th, defended the critical sector from the Food Combine past the Grain Elevator and Railroad Station No. 2 to the south bank of the Tsaritsa.

Late on September 18 General Chuikov issued orders for a counterattack the next day at noon to attempt to destroy the German forces penetrating into the city. The 42nd Brigade, with the attached remnants of the 244th, was tasked with attacking south along the railroad to the railroad station (No. 1) in close cooperation with the left wing of 13th Guards. Each of the two units had fewer than 200 men remaining but continued to engage the 211th Regiment of 71st Infantry in the vicinity of 1 May Square. Early the next morning the combined force was reported as "... continuing to fight street battles in the city. Their positions are being confirmed."

On September 20 the combined 42nd/244th continued withdrawing eastward form the vicinity of 1 May Square toward the Volga under intense pressure from the 211th Regiment. The following day the formation clung to its defenses along Pushkinskaya Street and the Tsaritsa. Over the next week it was gradually pressed back to the Volga along with other decimated units prior to being evacuated to the east bank for rebuilding. As of October 1 the 244th was in the reserves of Stalingrad Front.

== Into Ukraine ==
Shortly after, the remnants of the division were moved by rail north to enter the Moscow Defence Zone for rebuilding and training. By the end of the month the personnel of the division were noted as being 33 percent of the year groups 1905-1923 (19–37 years old), with the rest being older, still quite an elderly cadre. During January 1943 it returned to the front, now as part of 1st Guards Army in Southwestern Front. It would remain in this Front (and its successor 3rd Ukrainian Front) until early 1945. By January 26 the division was assigned to 6th Guards Rifle Corps.

=== Operation Gallop ===
The Army commander, Lt. Gen. V. I. Kuznetsov, submitted his operational plan on the same date, which included:

6th Guards Rifle Corps will attack from the Nizhnee, Krymskaia, Slavianoserbsk, and Zheltoe line in the general direction of Sergo and Artemovsk. Capture Voroshilovgrad with one rifle division in coordination with the 3rd Guards Army.

The 244th and 44th Guards Rifle Divisions were expected to destroy the German forces in the Irmino and Sergo region with concentric attacks and reach the Voroshilovsk front by the end of the first day. Artemovsk was to be taken by the end of the third day and the two divisions were to dig in along the Andreevka–Krasnoarmeiskii Rudnik line by the end of the eighth day while sending reconnaissance elements forward. The Front began its advance across the Northern Donets River on January 30 and made spectacular progress, although Voroshilovgrad was not liberated until February 14. Shortly after the advance began the 244th left 6th Guards Corps and came under direct Army control.

==== Third Battle of Kharkiv ====
At the end of the operation on February 18 the Army was consolidating, and its 4th Guards Rifle Corps (35th Guards, 41st Guards, and 244th Rifle Divisions) was transferred to the 6th Army. The next day Army Group South began its counteroffensive toward Kharkiv and Southwestern Front was soon scrambling to deal with the altered dynamic. In its report for February 20 the Front stated that the 4th Guards Corps was continuing to fight stubbornly on the northern outskirts of Novo-Moskovsk while attempting to capture Sinelnikovo, and that the 244th was on the march to the Prishtopovka region. By February 27 the division had had part of its forces fighting encircled in the Iurevka region while, in conjunction with the 267th Rifle Division, was holding on to Nizhnee Rasdory and Shirokov with its main forces. At the end of the next day one of the 244th's rifle regiments was fighting in the Dmitrovka, Novo-Kamyshevakha and Vernopole region, while a second regiment, supported by a battalion of the 11th Tank Brigade, withdrew from Bazaleevka to Brazhevka and Malaia Kamyshevakha. By the start of March the 4th Guards Corps had been moved to direct command of the Front; the 244th had again been heavily damaged and would require rebuilding.

=== Advance to the Dniepr ===
By the start of April it was serving as a separate division in the reserves of Southwestern Front, but later in the month it came under command of 12th Army. During July, in the buildup to the summer offensive through eastern Ukraine the 244th was subordinated to the 66th Rifle Corps in the same Army. At this time the 12th Army was located along the Northern Donets east of Izium.

Southwestern Front made its first effort to advance into the Donbas against 1st Panzer Army on July 17, but this was defeated after two weeks. The Front commander, Army Gen. R. Ya. Malinovskii, then regrouped his forces for a renewed effort that began on August 13. 1st Panzer again held its ground in the early going, but the rebuilt 6th Army to its south soon collapsed before the forces of Southern Front; by August 31 both German armies were falling back to the Kalmius River. On September 8 Hitler finally authorized a retreat to the Dniepr, leading to a race between the two sides. As 1st Panzer approached the river on September 17 Hitler insisted that it strengthen a bridgehead east of Zaporizhzhia to protect the nearby manganese mines at Nikopol.

On September 23 the 907th Rifle Regiment was involved in fighting for the village of Ivanenki. The 19-year-old medic Valeria Osipovna Gnarovskaya, who had won the medal "For Courage" the previous year, was working under fire to remove her wounded comrades to the dressing station by crawling while bearing their weight on top of her. At one point a pair of Tiger tanks broke through the regiment's lines, approaching the dressing station and the regimental headquarters. To save her patients, Gnarovskaya took up a bundle of grenades, rushed under one of the tanks and blew it up at the cost of her own life. The remaining Tiger was disabled or driven off by other soldiers. On June 2, 1944, she was posthumously made a Hero of the Soviet Union, and in 1945 the village was renamed Gnarovskoye in her honor.

Southwestern Front launched a strong attack on October 1 against the Zaporizhzhia bridgehead, making a small penetration that 1st Panzer Army eliminated before the end of the day. Despite this success the German commander asked permission to give up the bridgehead anyway, stating that to attempt to stand there would consume too many troops. The next day the Red Army broke off the offensive along the entire front for a week for regrouping and to bring up fresh units. On the morning of October 10 the 12th, 3rd Guards and 8th Guards Armies renewed the attack on the bridgehead following a massive artillery preparation and while the German line mostly held the losses on both sides were very heavy. A tank attack on the night of October 13 reached the northeast corner of the city, and the next day the division was awarded a battle honor:

ZAPOROZHYE - ...244th Rifle Division (Major General Afanasev, Georgii Afanasevich)... The troops who participated in the liberation of Zaporozhye, by the order of the Supreme High Command of 14 October 1943, and a commendation in Moscow, are given a salute of 20 artillery salvoes from 224 guns.

== Into Western Ukraine and Moldavia ==
During November 12 Army was disbanded and the division, along with the rest of 66th Corps, was transferred to 6th Army.

=== Nikopol-Kryvyi Rih Offensive ===
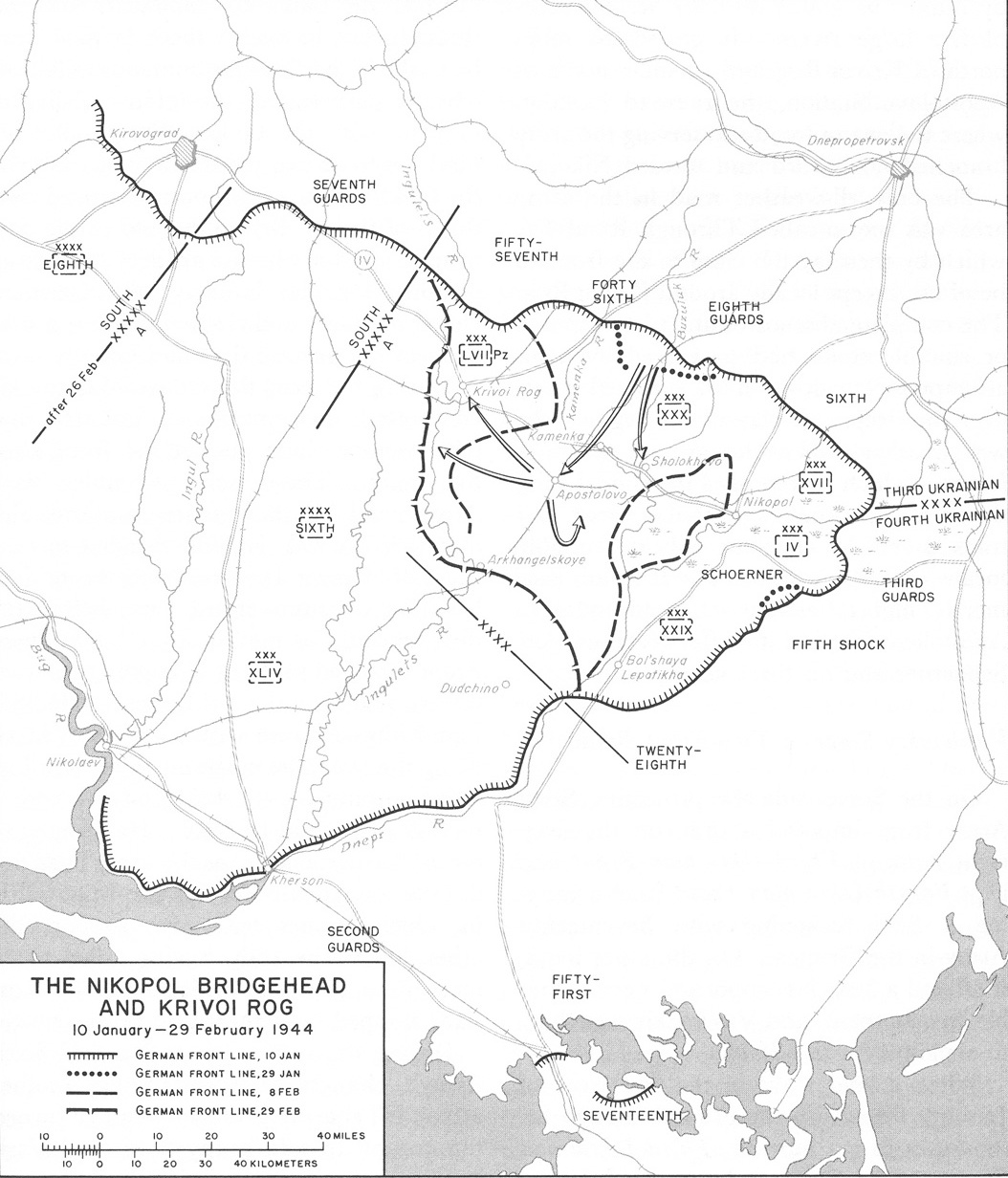
Nikopol-Kryvyi Rih Offensive

3rd Ukrainian Front's first effort to renew the drive on Kryvyi Rih began on January 10, 1944, led mainly by 46th Army, but made only modest gains at considerable cost and was halted on the 16th. The offensive was renewed on January 30 after a powerful artillery preparation against the positions of the XXX Army Corps on the same sector of the line, but this was met with a counter-barrage that disrupted the attack. A new effort the next day, backed by even heavier artillery and air support, made progress but still did not penetrate the German line. The Nikopol bridgehead had been weakened by transfers to other sectors and 4th Ukrainian Front drove a deep wedge into its south end. On February 4 the German 6th Army ordered the bridgehead to be evacuated. In a decree issued on February 13, in recognition of the liberation of Nikopol and Apostolove, the 244th was awarded the Order of the Red Banner. Late in January the division had been moved to direct Army command, but in February it returned to 66th Corps, where it remained for the duration of the war.

=== Battle for Odesa ===
With the diversion of 4th Ukrainian Front into the Crimea, 3rd Ukrainian took up the southern flank as the Red Army pressed onward into western Ukraine. On March 26 General Malinovskii ordered a renewed offensive in the direction of Odesa, which included the 6th Army. On April 4 Cavalry-Mechanized Group Pliyev and the lead elements of 37th Army captured the town of Razdelnaia, again splitting German 6th Army in two. 6th Army was now ordered to envelop Odesa from the northwest. After heavy fighting the 5th Shock Army entered the city's northern suburbs on the evening of April 9. Overnight the forward elements of 8th Guards Army, 6th Army, and the Pliyev Group also drew up to the Odesa defenses. With the Soviet trap closing the German LXXII Army Corps began breaking out to the west, allowing the Soviet forces to liberate the city by 1000 hours on April 10 after only minor fighting. On April 20 the 244th would receive the Order of Suvorov, 2nd Degree, for its role in this victory.

=== First Jassy-Kishinev Offensive ===
After the liberation of Odessa, 6th Army was ordered to spend about a week resting and refitting before moving west to the Dniestr River to reinforce the Front's advance on Chișinău. On about April 14, 6th Army was directed to cross the Dniestr and to occupy positions vacated by 6th Guards Rifle Corps in the central portion of 37th Army's bridgehead south of Tiraspol by day's end on April 18. In the event, this timetable proved too ambitious, and 6th Army's offensive was delayed until the morning of April 25. The 203rd and 333rd Rifle Divisions led the attack with the 244th in second echelon; the sector was defended by a battle group of the German 15th Infantry Division. The two leading divisions managed to penetrate the forward German defenses and advance about 2 km, but were then halted by intense German artillery and machine gun fire, as well as air strikes. German reserves launched counterattacks the next day which retook most of the gains and generally brought the advance to a complete halt by April 29. Shortly afterwards, 6th Army was disbanded.

== Into the Balkans and Postwar ==
With the disbandment of 6th Army the 244th, with its 66th Corps, was transferred to 37th Army, where it would remain into the postwar. Just prior to the renewed offensive into Moldavia on August 7 General Afanasev was wounded and hospitalized. After his recovery in January 1945 he served as deputy commander of 26th Army before being wounded again in March, which took him out of the war. From August 1947 until his retirement in January 1951 he was the Head of the Archives of the Ministry of the Armed Forces. On August 16 Col. Georgii Ivanovich Kolyadin took over command of the 244th; he had previously served as deputy commander of the 259th Rifle Division. At this time the 66th Corps consisted of the 244th, 333rd and 61st Guards Rifle Divisions.

=== Second Jassy-Kishinev Offensive ===
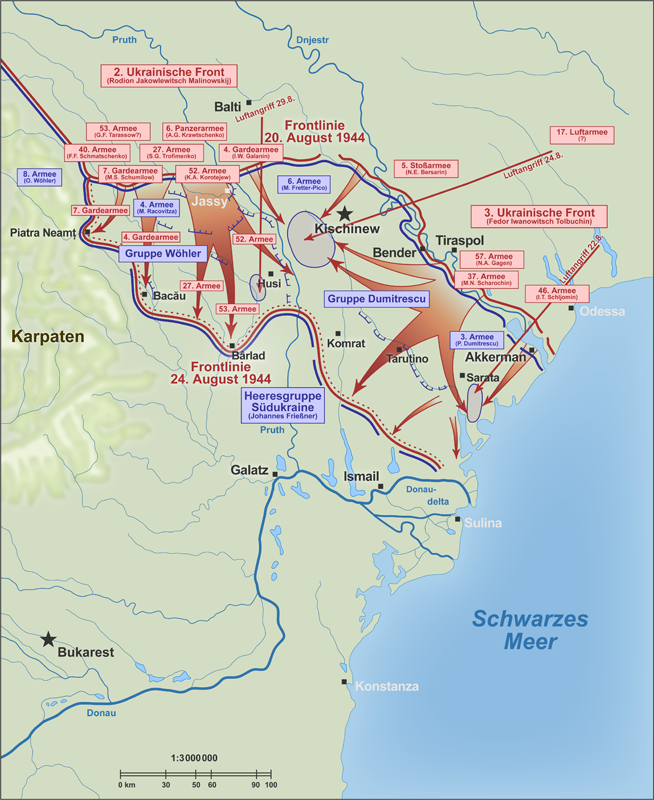
Map of Second Jassy-Kishinev Offensive (in German). Note position of 37th Army.

During the new offensive, which began on August 20, 37th Army's immediate objective was to break through the heavily fortified German/Romanian defensive zone so the Army's mobile group, 7th Mechanized Corps, could be committed into a clean breach. The 61st Guards and 333rd Divisions were in first echelon and the 244th was behind the 333rd. The Corps was backed by a total of two artillery brigades, a mortar brigade, a howitzer regiment, two anti-tank regiments plus an additional battalion, a Guards Mortar regiment, a tank and a self-propelled artillery regiment, plus combat engineer elements. The Corps was to launch its main attack in the general direction of height 151.7 and height 210.4 and break through the German defense between Fantina-Mascui and a grove 2 km east of height 151,7 with the immediate task of capturing the crest line east of Cîrnățeni. By the end of the second day the Corps was to occupy a line from Căușeni to Opaci.

37th Army's offensive began with a reconnaissance-in-force by five penal companies with significant artillery support at 0500 hours. The main artillery preparation began at 0800, and continued for 105 minutes. As early as 1030 hours the defenders had lost the first and second trenches of their first defensive position to the 61st Guards. Meanwhile, the 333rd Division, with armor support, had broken through the Germans' first and second positions and reached their third position southeast of Cîrnățeni, where the division ran into resistance from the remnants of the German 306th Infantry Division. The fight lasted about an hour until these forces were destroyed.

Late in the day the German 6th Army brought up the 93rd Motorized Regiment and a battalion of tanks from the 13th Panzer Division (up to 35 tanks and assault guns) to the area from height 133.6 to Căușeni Hill in order to halt the further advance of 66th Corps with the help of the routed units of the 15th and 306th Divisions. In order to counter this increased resistance the 66th Corps released the 244th from second echelon. As it advanced to its jumping-off position it was diverted to the north and reached the village of Kirnatsen. It went into the attack only at 2300 hours, together with the 333rd, but was unsuccessful in taking height 210.4, and then prepared to resume the attack in daylight. The next morning the 7th Mechanized Corps was tasked with entering the breach in the German defenses at 0600 hours while the 66th Corps was ordered to advance in the direction of Căușeni Hill and Opaci, outflanking Căușeni from the south, and by the end of the day to capture the line from Sălcuța to Tokuz. The 333rd, in cooperation with forward detachments of the 244th, captured Opaci in a night attack.

With the German line breached by 37th Army, in the evening of August 21 the STAVKA issued Order No. 00442, assigning a mission of "beating off the enemy rearguards, throwing them back to the north and, by the close of 22 August... [to] capture the Sălcuța -- Taraclia -- Kenbaran -- Saka River area with the rifle formations." During the day the 913th Regiment assisted the 333rd in taking Sălcuța while the 907th and 911th liberated Taraclia and Baimaclia by 2000 hours. By the end of the day contact had been established with 57th Army's 9th Rifle Corps, which had captured Zaim. At 0400 hours on August 23 the 66th Corps was transferred to 57th Army, along with the 398th Guards Self-Propelled Artillery Regiment (mixed SU-152s and IS-2 heavy tanks) and four artillery and mortar regiments, and was ordered to capture a line from Căinari to Gangura to Cărbuna to Sagaidac by the end of the day while a forward detachment occupied Răzeni.

On August 24 the 3rd and 2nd Ukrainian Fronts completed the encirclement of the Chișinău grouping, which made desperate efforts to break out over the following days. A favorable situation soon arose to split part of this force and the 66th and 9th Guards Rifle Corps converged on the village of Gura Galbenei from the east and north respectively and foiled a breakthrough attempt. By the end of August 27 the German 6th Army, which made up the bulk of the grouping, had been defeated and destroyed. 66th Corps now joined in the exploitation towards the Prut River and soon into Romania, which had left the Axis following a coup d'état on August 24. By September 1 the 244th and its 66th Corps had rejoined the 37th Army.

=== Occupation Duties ===
3rd Ukrainian Front crossed into Bulgaria with part of its forces on September 8, and by October the Army was in the Yambol region of that country, which had also left the Axis. On November 8 Colonel Kolyadin left the 244th; he was soon sent to the Voroshilov Academy for further military education. He was replaced the next day by Col. Mark Davidovich Gefter, but this officer was in turn replaced on December 3 by Col. Pavel Trofimovich Sedin, who would remain in command into the postwar. At the end of the year the 37th became a separate army, not under any Front command, and served as a garrison unit in the Balkans until after the German surrender.

=== Postwar ===
As of June 10 the division, along with the rest of 37th Army, was part of the Southern Group of Forces, stationed in Bulgaria. On June 10, 1946, the Army became the 10th Mechanized Army and the 244th was converted to the 19th Mechanized Division at Varna, after which it was moved to the North Caucasus Military District. It was disbanded under that command on June 19, 1947.
