= Codru Reserve =

Scientific reserve in Moldova

Coordinates: 47°04′N 28°30′E

- Rezervația științifică Codru
- IUCN category Ia (strict nature reserve)
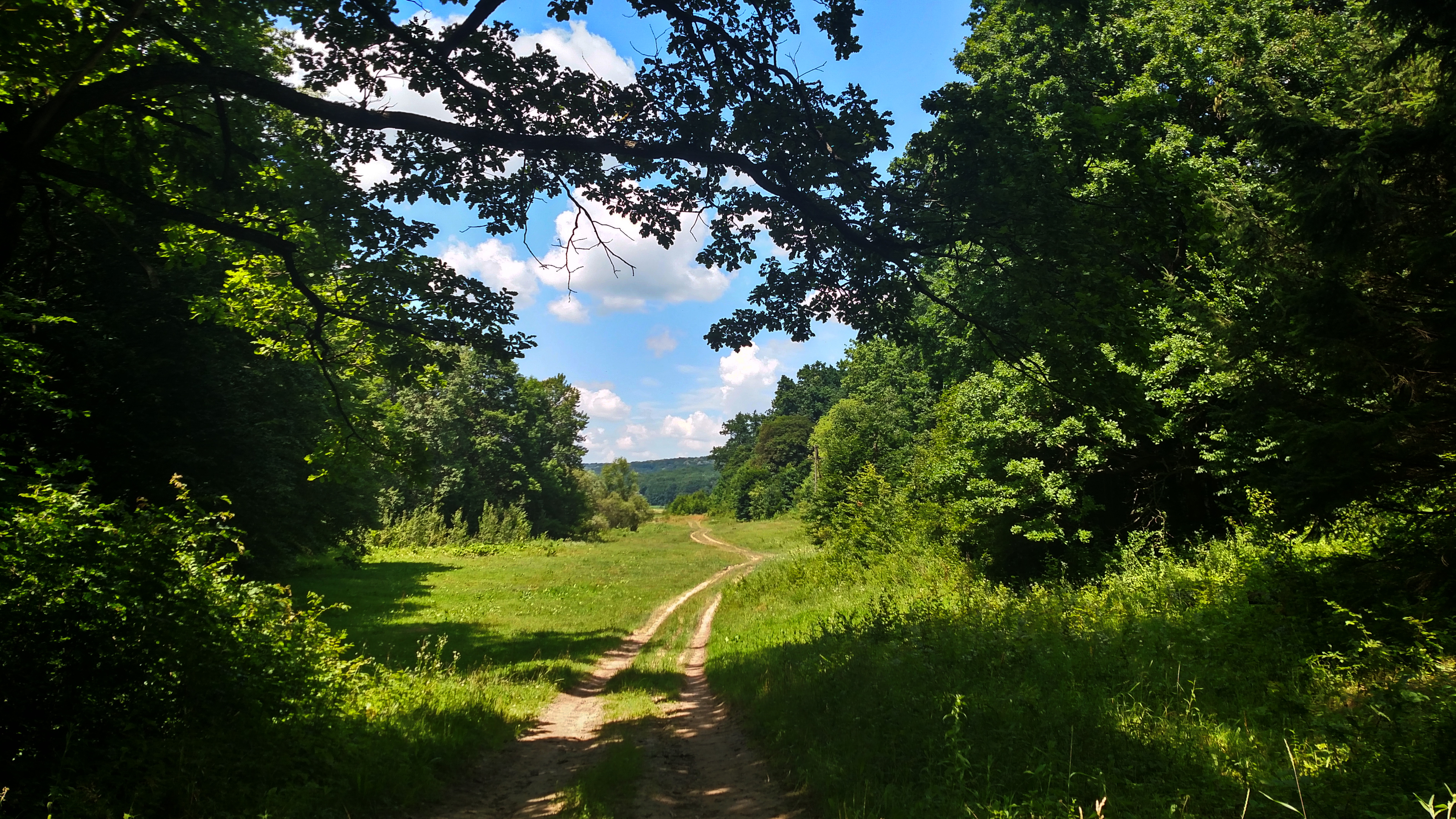
- Location: Raionul Strășeni, Moldova
- Area: 5,177 hectares (51.77 km^{2})
- Established: 1971

Codru Reserve (Romanian: Rezervaţia Codru; plural: Codrii) is a scientific reserve in Străşeni District, Moldova. Established in 1971, it encompasses 5,177 hectares of protected forest ecosystem of the Codri area. The reserve is situated in the central part of Moldova and includes the Condrița forest reserve area, which is partly bounded by Condrița village to the north and Ulmu village of Ialoveni District to the south.

== Archaeology ==
The reserve has gained archaeological significance in recent years. In July 2021, archaeologists discovered the Condrița hoard within the reserve's boundaries, approximately 1 kilometre west of Condrița village and 0.7–0.8 kilometers north of the Chișinău-Leușeni highway. This hoard, dating to the Cucuteni A – Tripolye BI period (second half of the 5th millennium BC), ranks as the second-largest assemblage of metal items from this period found in Moldova, after the Cărbuna village hoard discovered in 1961. The Condrița hoard contained numerous copper objects, including bracelets, a hammer axe, as well as flint arrowheads and gold items, all originally contained in a pottery vessel. The discovery suggests that the forest area of the Codru Reserve has been significant to human activity for millennia, though no settlement evidence was found in the immediate vicinity of the hoard, indicating it was deliberately hidden in this forested region.

== Biodiversity ==
The Codru Reserve is the single known Moldovan location for the gastropod species Bulgarica cana.
