= Văsieni =

Văsieni may refer to:

- Văsieni, Ialoveni, a commune in Ialoveni district, Moldova
- Văsieni, Teleneşti, a commune in Teleneşti district, Moldova
