= Piatra Albă =

Piatra Albă may refer to:

- Piatra Albă, a village in Mileştii Mici Commune, Ialoveni district, Moldova
- Piatra Albă, a village in Odăile Commune, Buzău County, Romania
