= Ulmu, Ialoveni =

Ulmu
- Village
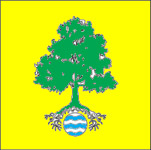
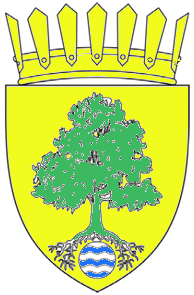
- Flag Seal

- The location of Ulmu inside Moldova
- Coordinates: 47.016546°N 28.544283°E
- Country: Moldova
- District: Ialoveni

Government
  - Mayor: Postică Grigore (PLDM)

Population (2014 census)
  - Total: 2,693
- Demonym(s): In romanian: Ulmean, Ulmeancă (Ulmenian)
- Time zone: UTC+2 (EET)
- Postal code: MD-6829

Ulmu is a settlement in Ialoveni District, Moldova. It is situated in the middle of the largest forest in Moldova, Codrii Moldovei. The soil of this zone, a type of chernozem, is favorable for various kinds of plantations. Currently, the most grown cultures are common for the central zone of Moldova, some of them are grapes, corn, cherry and sour cherry trees and many more. The Botna River, which crosses the village, is a tributary of the Nistru River. The river can dry out completely during summer months. The river doesn't cause floods, due to its low depth and pollution.

Ulmu is located strategically, at equal distances from Chișinău, and the Romanian border and other villages from the same district. The E581 highway is being constructed in the vicinity.

== Etymology ==
It is believed that the name of the village is derived from a kind of tree that is specific to this region, Ulmus (from Latin Ulmus). Unfortunately this kind of tree, due to the human activity, is rare, because of its usage in peoples' households and farms.

== Ulmu today ==
Ulmu is a village with a medium count of inhabitants. Due to the immigration, the population count have been suffered a decline.

The education in Ulmu is provided by a high school and a kindergarten. The high school from this village is named after the well-known, Romanian writer, Mihai Eminescu, there is also a post office, a newly built hospital (from 2011), some stores and a culture house. As of 2010, the construction of a new auto magistrale has begun. It aims to link the neighboring villages of Văsieni, Ruseștii Noi and Ulmu itself to the European magistrale M1 directly. There are some negotiations with the government to allocate funds to pave the road. The mobile phone and 3G internet coverage is being provided by 3-4 antennas which are situated on village's key points. There is also a cable operator, which is very popular here. The buses and minibuses circulate according to an established schedule from Chișinău, it takes around 30–40 minutes to get from Ulmu to Chișinău and vice versa.

Both young men and old men are taken in account of by the village hall. Thus, the village has attractions for the youth, like soccer fields, libraries, playgrounds and for the elderly it has a public eatery and a nursing home.
