= Natalia Dadiani =

- Postal stamp in Moldova dedicated to Natalia Dadiani, 2010
- Born: 1865
- Died: 1903 (aged 37–38); Chișinău
- Citizenship: Russian Empire
- Occupation: teacher

Princess Natalia Dadiani (Russian: княгиня Наталья Годлевская-Дадиани, 1865–1903, was an educator and advocate of girls' secondary education from Chișinău, Bessarabia Governorate, Russian Empire. Natalia Dadiani is recognized as one of the most notable women in Moldova's history.

== Early life and career ==
Natalia was born in Puhoi, near Chișinău, into a noble (boyar) family that owned an estate near Tighina (Bender). She was born on 30 July 1865 (Old Style), equivalent to 11 August 1865 (New Style). However, sources disagree; for example, Moldpres gives her birth date as 30 June 1865.

Born Natalia Godlevskaia (Polish: Godlewski) into a noble Polish family, she became Princess Dadiani after marrying Prince Beglari Giorgi Davit (1857 – 1947), a son of David Zurabi Dadiani of the House of Dadiani in Abkhazia.

Natalia graduated with a gold medal (an academic distinction for top graduates) from the Zemstvo Girls' Gymnasium in Chișinău. She began teaching geography, initially at the same school, and later at the gymnasium of Vera Narodostavskaia (Russian: Вера Александровна Народоставская).

Following Narodostavskaia's death, Natalia became the gymnasium's director. Under her leadership, the school was reorganized into an eight-year gymnasium under the authority of the Ministry of Public Education, and was renamed into Girls' Gymnasium No. 2 in Chișinău, founded by Princess Dadiani.

Historian Ştefan Petrescu cites the memoirs of Nina Belyavskaya, a former pupil in the girls' gymnasium. Nina describes Natalia Dadiani as “a very intelligent and interesting woman [..] a tall blonde, she was not beautiful, yet she had a very expressive face. She taught geography, and she taught it in such a way that one never wanted the lesson to end.”

== Building a new school: Improving conditions for girls' education ==
As of 1894, Dadiani's school was operating in an old, poorly heated, single-storey building. Former pupil Nina Belyavskaya recalled the premises as “not at all suited for a children’s facility: it had small windows and a cramped, walk-through room used for breaks and snacks. [..] The bathrooms were cold and, naturally, lacked any sewage system”; however, Nina praised her teachers and Dadiani's geography lessons.

In 1897, drawing on her title of princess and family resources, Natalia Dadiani purchased land and buildings in the centre of Chișinău (at the present-day intersection of 31 August 1989 Street and Pușkin Street), where she commissioned the construction of a new school building. The project was designed by architect Alexandru Bernardazzi and received financial support from Dadiani, Ceavceavadze, and Lascari families.

The building was constructed in the style of eclecticism. In 2016, art historian Adrian-Silvan Ionescu described the building as built “in an eclectic style that wove together elements from Renaissance and Classical architecture with Neo-Gothic and Baroque ornamentation”; he also noted the interplay of red and white in the building's colour scheme and mentioned that the building reflected the tastes of the aristocracy of that historical period.

The new school building was formally consecrated on 30 August 1901. On 1 September 1901, the newspaper Bessarabian Provincial Gazette («Бессарабские губернские ведомости», no. 185) reported:

“Those present admired the spacious corridors, the high-ceilinged classrooms, their layout and intended purpose, the kitchen, the steam-heated facilities, as well as the handicrafts produced by the female students. The entire building met the sanitary standards required of educational institutions.”

Dadiani's girls' gymnasium in Chișinău

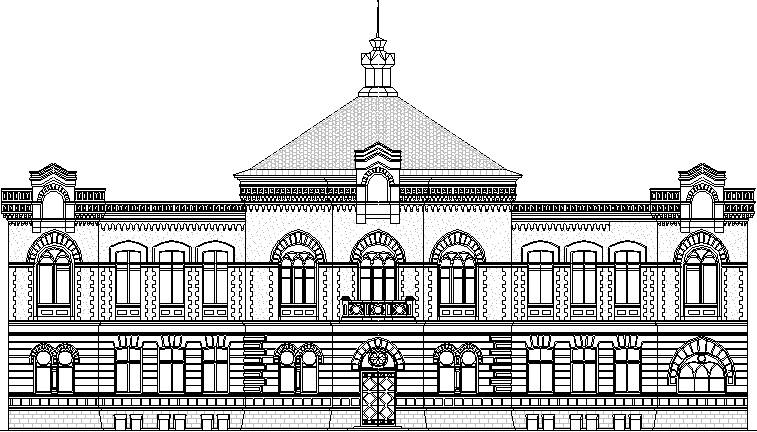
Sketch of the building

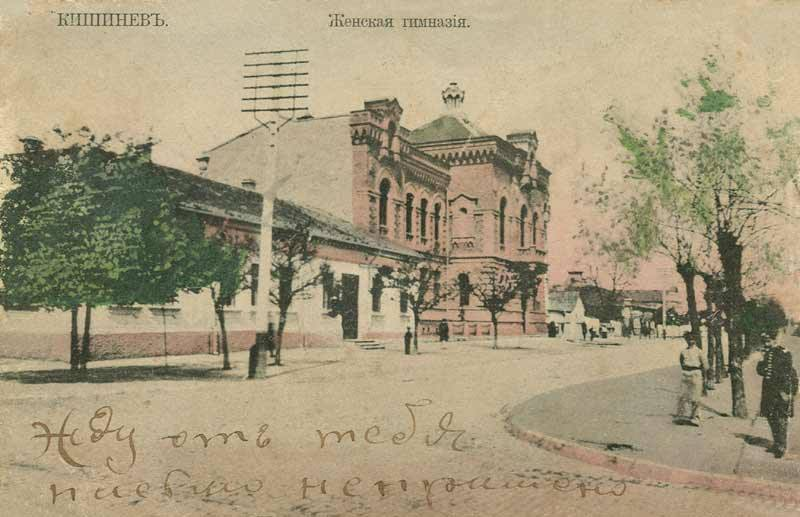
Historic view of the building

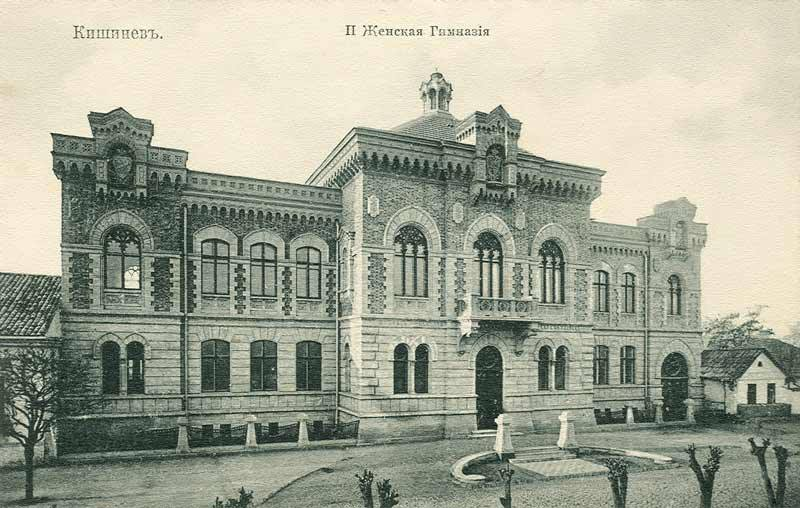
Another historic view of the building

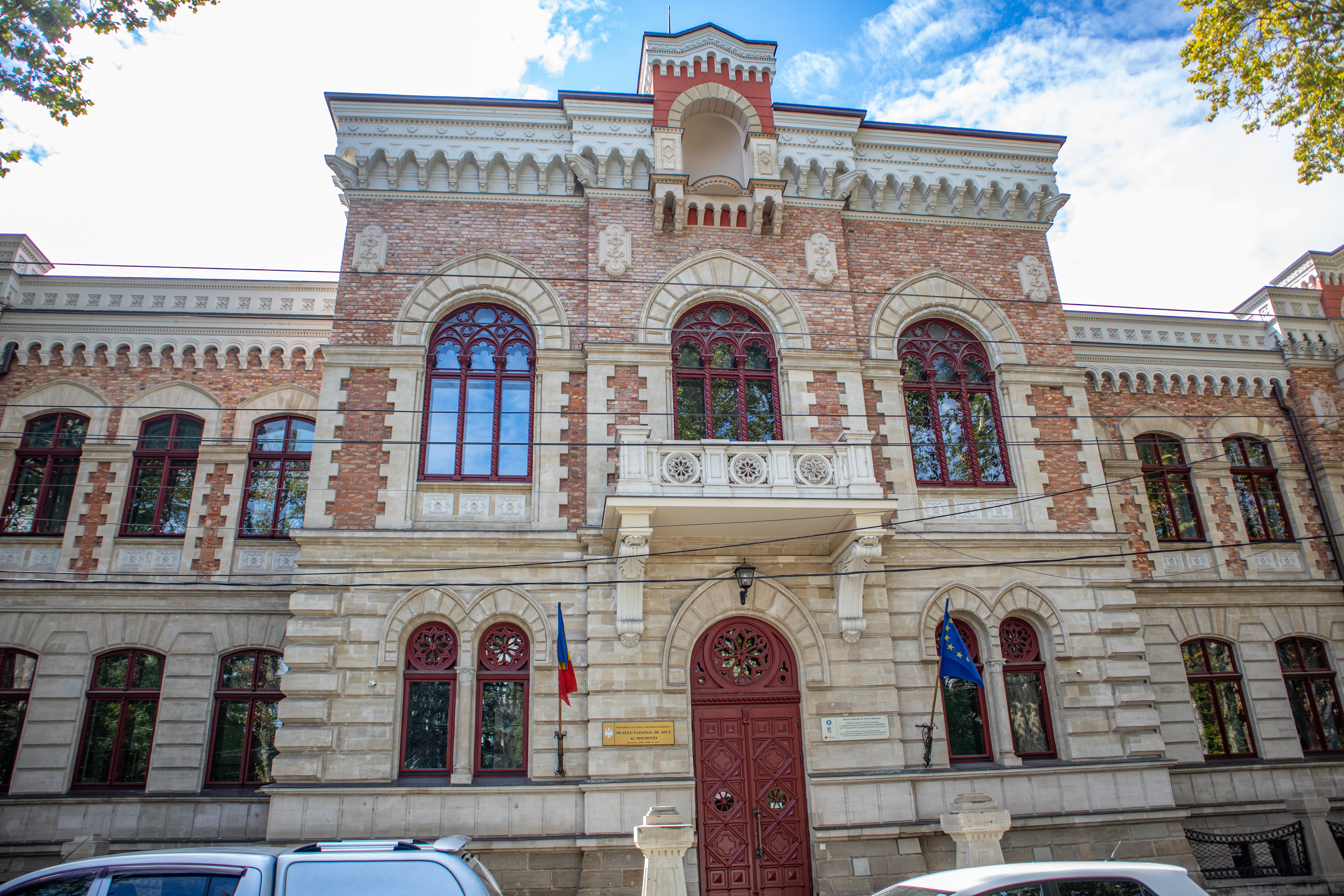
The former gymnasium, now home to the National Museum of Fine Arts

== Death and legacy ==
Dadiani's grave in Chișinău Central Cemetery

Natalia Dadiani died on 18 October 1903 after contracting typhoid fever and was buried at the Armenian Cemetery (Chișinău Central Cemetery). Dadiani's gravestone gives her death date as 18 October 1903 (Old Style), equivalent to 31 October 1903 (New Style). Her gravestone carries the inscription: "To the tireless worker in the field of women’s education, the unforgotten Princess Natalia Dadiani, from collaborators and friends."

In 1918, her school was renamed to the Princess Natalia Dadiani Girls’ Lyceum. Historian Ștefan Petrescu concluded that the lyceum made a substantial contribution to girls’ education in interwar Bessarabia.

At present, the building commissioned by Natalia Dadiani is designated an architectural monument and houses the National Museum of Fine Arts, Chișinău.

In 1996, a present-day lyceum in the Buiucani sector of Chișinău has been named in her honour. The institution itself was founded in 1928 as a primary school and is not historically connected to Natalia Dadiani, but carries her name.

In 2010, Moldova issued a commemorative stamp in the honour of Natalia Dadiani, to mark the 145th anniversary of her birth. The stamp was part of the series “Anniversaries and Commemorations: Distinguished Personalities” and had a circulation of 50,000 copies.
