= Molești =

- Village
- Location within Moldova
- Coordinates: 46.7858333333°N 28.7780555556°E
- Country: Moldova
- District: Ialoveni District

Government
  - Mayor: Mihail Catan (PDM)

Population (2014 census)
  - Total: 2,776
- Time zone: UTC+2 (EET)
  - Summer (DST): UTC+3 (EEST)

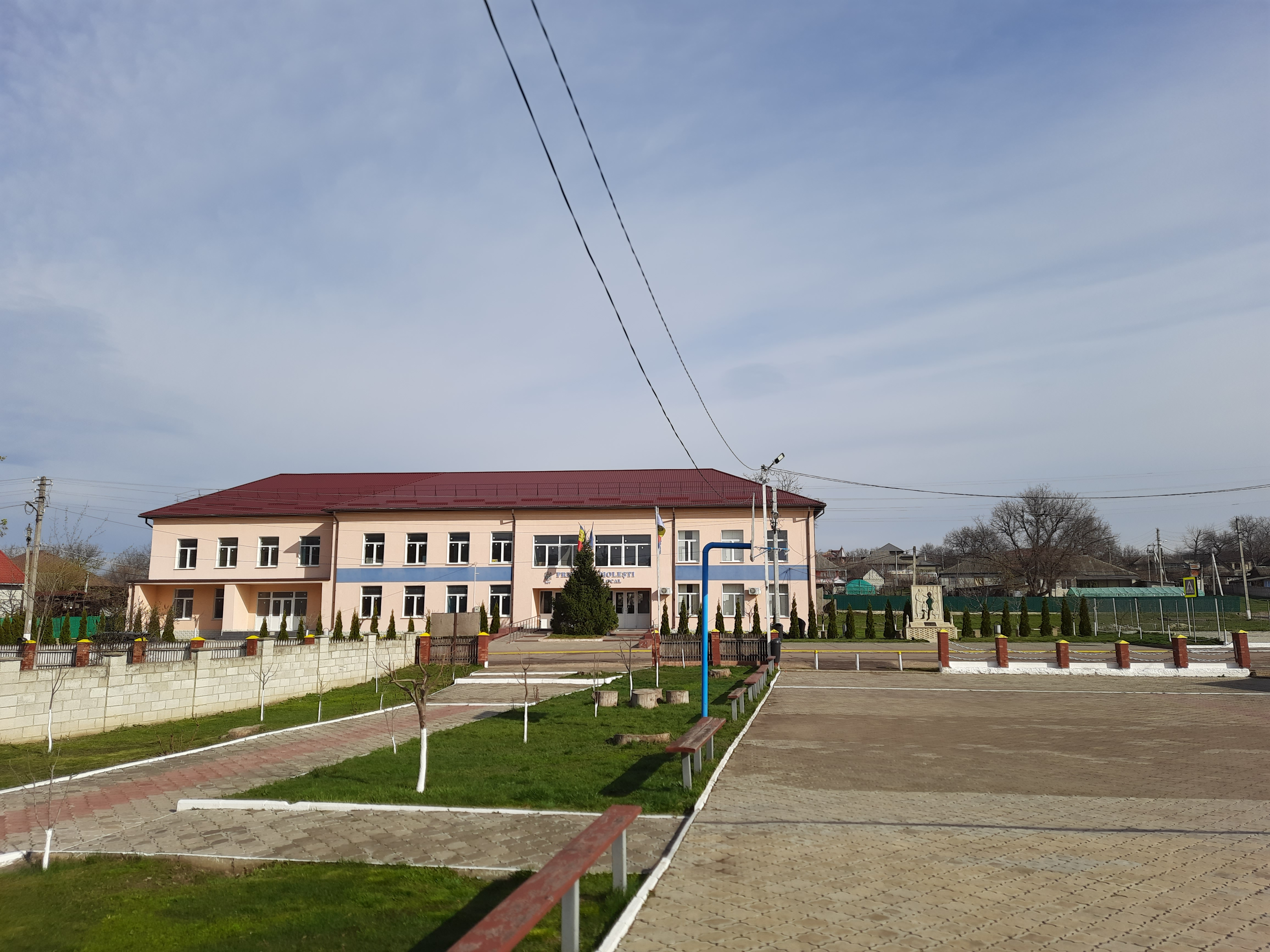
Molești village hall in Ialoveni district.

Molești is a village in Ialoveni District, Moldova.
