= Suric =

- Village
- Suric
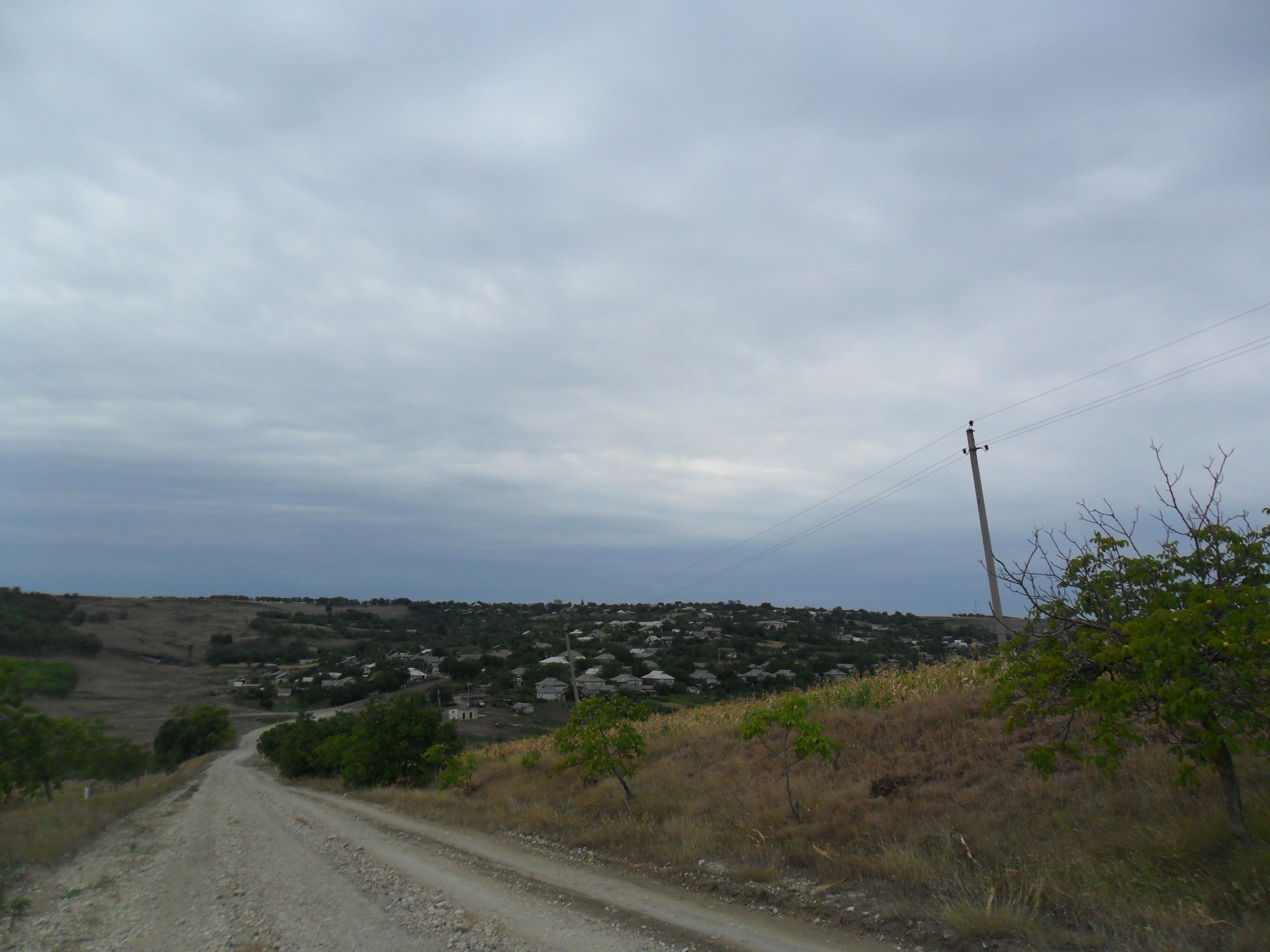

- Location within Moldova
- Country: Moldova
- Elevation: 212 m (696 ft)

Population (2014 census)
  - Total: 795
- Time zone: UTC+2 (EET)
  - Summer (DST): UTC+3 (EEST)
- Postal code: MD-4130

Suric is a village in Cimișlia District, Moldova.
