= Javgur =

- Commune
- Location within Moldova
- Coordinates: 46.5391666667°N 28.6138888889°E
- Country: Moldova
- District: Cimișlia

Government
  - Mayor: Vacarciuc Gheorghe Gheorghe

Population (2014)
  - Total: 1,359
- Time zone: UTC+2 (EET)
  - Summer (DST): UTC+3 (EEST)

Javgur is a commune in Cimișlia District, Moldova. It is composed of three villages: Artimonovca, Javgur and Maximeni.
