= Bardar =

- Commune and village
- Location in Moldova
- Coordinates: 46°54′N 28°40′E
- Country: Moldova
- District: Ialoveni District

Population (2014 census)
  - Total: 4,809
- Time zone: UTC+2 (EET)
  - Summer (DST): UTC+3 (EEST)

Bardar is a large commune located 15 kilometres south-west of Chișinău, in Ialoveni District, Moldova. The sumptuous landscape of the region, amid scenic hills dressed in vineyards, orchards and forests gives the area an overwhelming beauty.

== Notable people ==
- Nicolae Grosu served as Member of the Moldovan Parliament (1917–1918)
- Aurel David a well-known painter for the Eminescu tree
- Vasile Iov pan flute musician
- Petru Vutcărău director, actor, artistic director of "Mihai Eminescu" National Theater
- Andrei Sava composer
- Mihai Toderaşcu interpreter and composer
- Angela Gonza reporter most known on PROTV Chisinau channel
- Corina Ţepeş light musician
- Nicolae Roşioru poet, director of "Local Time" newspaper
- Petru Macovei director of the Independent Press Association
- Monica Babuc Minister of Culture, Education and Research
- Octavian Calmic Deputy Prime Minister, former Minister of Economy and Infrastructure
- Valeriu Herţa graphic designer, member of the Union of Fine Artists
