= Gangura =

- Commune
- Location within Moldova
- Coordinates: 46.73°N 29.0130555556°E
- Country: Moldova
- District: Ialoveni District

Government
  - Mayor: Basli Ion

Population (2014)
  - Total: 2,173
- Time zone: UTC+2 (EET)
  - Summer (DST): UTC+3 (EEST)

Gangura is a commune in Ialoveni District, Moldova. It is composed of four villages: Alexandrovca, Gangura, Homuteanovca and Misovca.
