= Satul Nou =

- Village
- Location within Moldova
- Coordinates: 46°36′58″N 28°54′32″E
- Country: Moldova
- District: Cimișlia

Government
  - Mayor: Natalia Chistol (BEPPEM)

Population (2014 census)
  - Total: 1,910
- Time zone: UTC+2 (EET)
  - Summer (DST): UTC+3 (EEST)

Satul Nou is a village in Cimișlia District, Moldova. It has a surface area of 30.1 km², and was first mentioned in a document from 1845.
