= Cărbuna =

Coordinates: 46.7122°N 28.9517°E

- Village
- Location within Moldova
- Country: Moldova

Government
  - Mayor: Constantin Cecoi (candidat independent)

Population (2014 census)
  - Total: 1,762
- Time zone: UTC+2 (EET)
  - Summer (DST): UTC+3 (EEST)
- Postal code: MD-7713

Cărbuna is a village in Ialoveni District, Moldova.
