= Puhoi, Ialoveni =

Puhoi
- Commune and village
- Location in Moldova
- Coordinates: 46°49′N 29°02′E
- Country: Moldova
- District: Ialoveni District

Population (2014 census)
  - Total: 5,518
- Time zone: UTC+2 (EET)
  - Summer (DST): UTC+3 (EEST)

Puhoi is a village in Ialoveni District, Moldova. Puhoi is home to the Asconi winery, where some of the village's residents are employed. American news magazine Time has described alcohol as "the lifeblood of the economy and the community".
