= Mileștii Mici =

- Commune
- Location within Moldova
- Coordinates: 46.900835°N 28.795856°E
- Country: Moldova
- District: Ialoveni District

Government
  - Mayor: Trohin Dan

Population (2014)
  - Total: 4,969
- Time zone: UTC+2 (EET)
  - Summer (DST): UTC+3 (EEST)

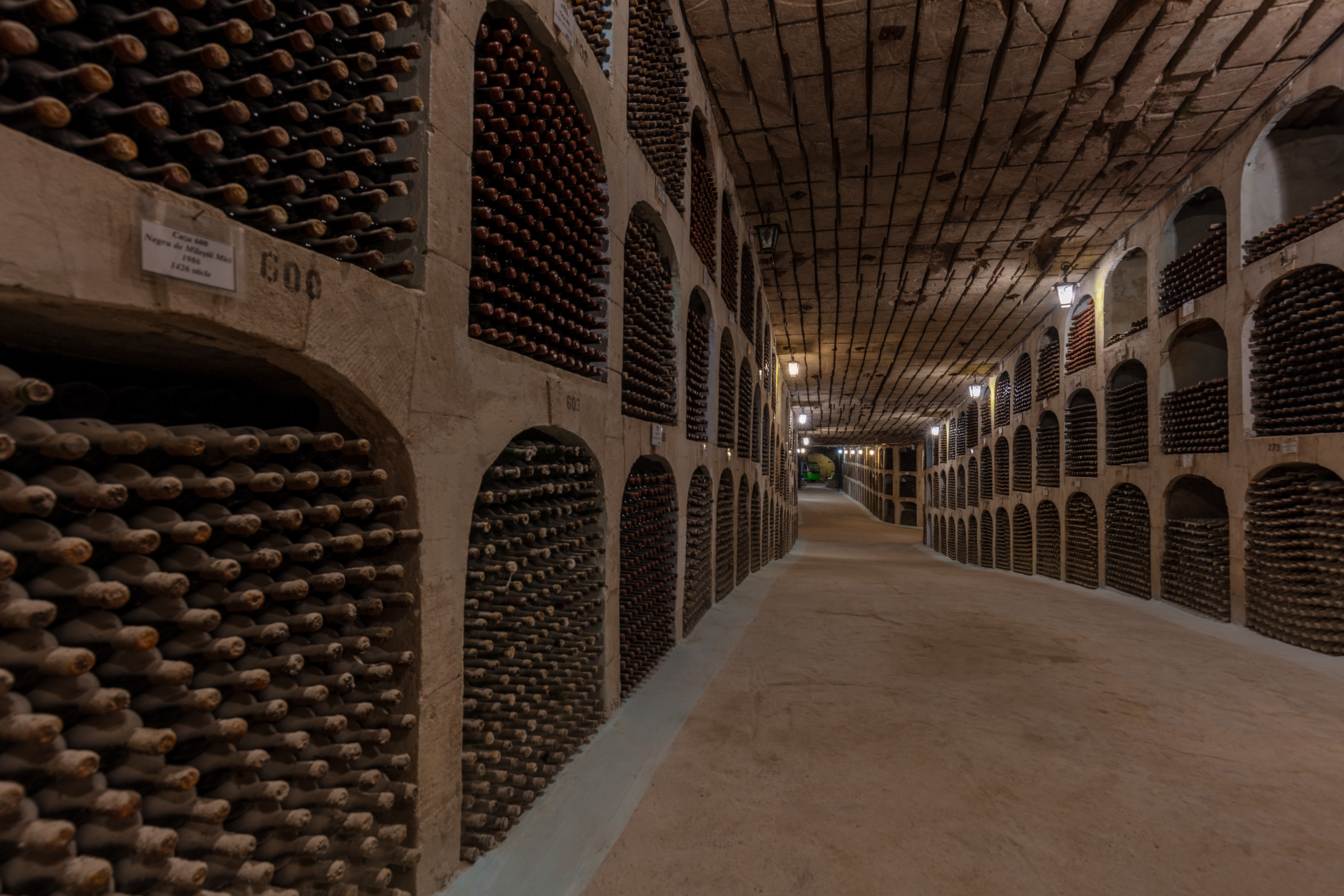
Wine cellars in Mileștii Mici

Mileștii Mici is a commune in Ialoveni District, Moldova, composed of two villages, Mileștii Mici and Piatra Albă. It has a population of over 4,500 and is 18 kilometres (11 mi) from Chişinău. For much of its history, the locals have extracted white stone from underneath the village. Several hundred kilometers of the underground extraction site exist today. Some of the shafts are used as cellars for storing Mileştii Mici wines.

== History ==
Mileștii Mici is an ancient Moldovan village, having been mentioned in ancient books and chronicles. Archeological research has found settlement remains from many different epochs and cultures, beginning in the tenth to eleventh millennium BC.

In 1970, Emmanuel Brihuneț, the priest of "Saint Nikolai" church in Mileștii Mici, discovered some references about the village in old manuscripts, dating from 30 March 1528.

In these early modern chronicles it is mentioned that King Petru Rares gave his grandson, Lashko-Voda from Isnovet, three other villages, two of which were situated around Isnovet River.

When the Soviet Union gained control under Moldova, there was an order to destroy the wine collection, but the workers made a secret door where they stored the collection.

== Wine cellars ==
Stretching for 250 kilometres (160 mi), of which only 120 kilometres (75 mi) are currently in use, the Mileștii Mici cellar complex is the largest in the world. In 2007, the Mileștii Mici wine cellars were noted in the Guinness World Records 2007 Yearbook, for having the largest (2 million bottles) wine collection in the world.
