= Văsieni, Telenești =

Văsieni
- Village
- Location within Moldova
- Coordinates: 47.4594444444°N 28.4411111111°E
- Country: Moldova
- District: Telenești District

Government
  - Mayor: Gheorghe Morgoci (PLDM)

Population (2014 census)
  - Total: 1,278
- Time zone: UTC+2 (EET)
  - Summer (DST): UTC+3 (EEST)

Văsieni is a village in Telenești District, Moldova.
