= Ialoveni =

- City
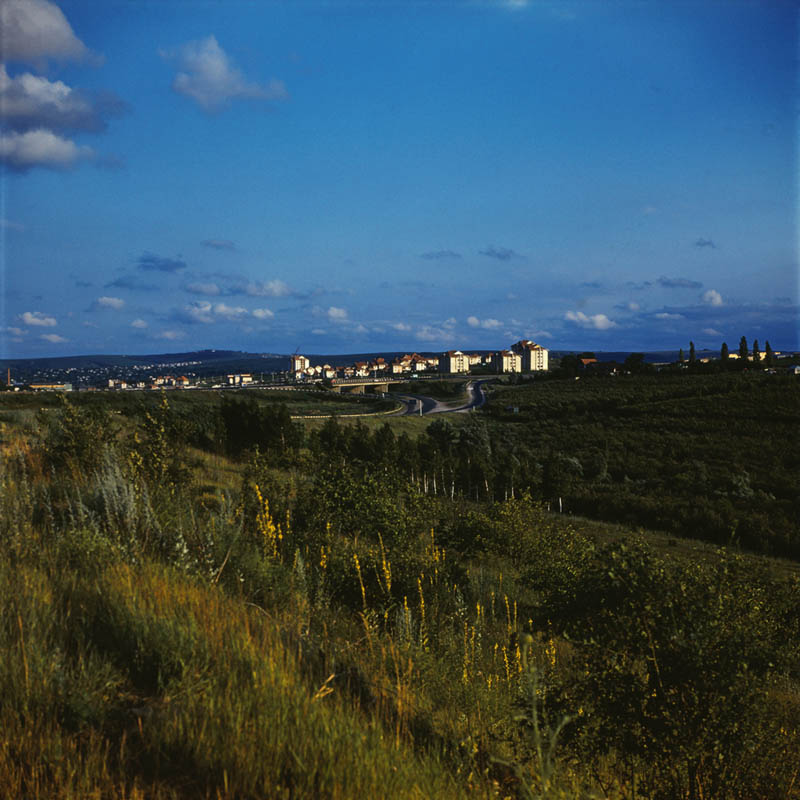

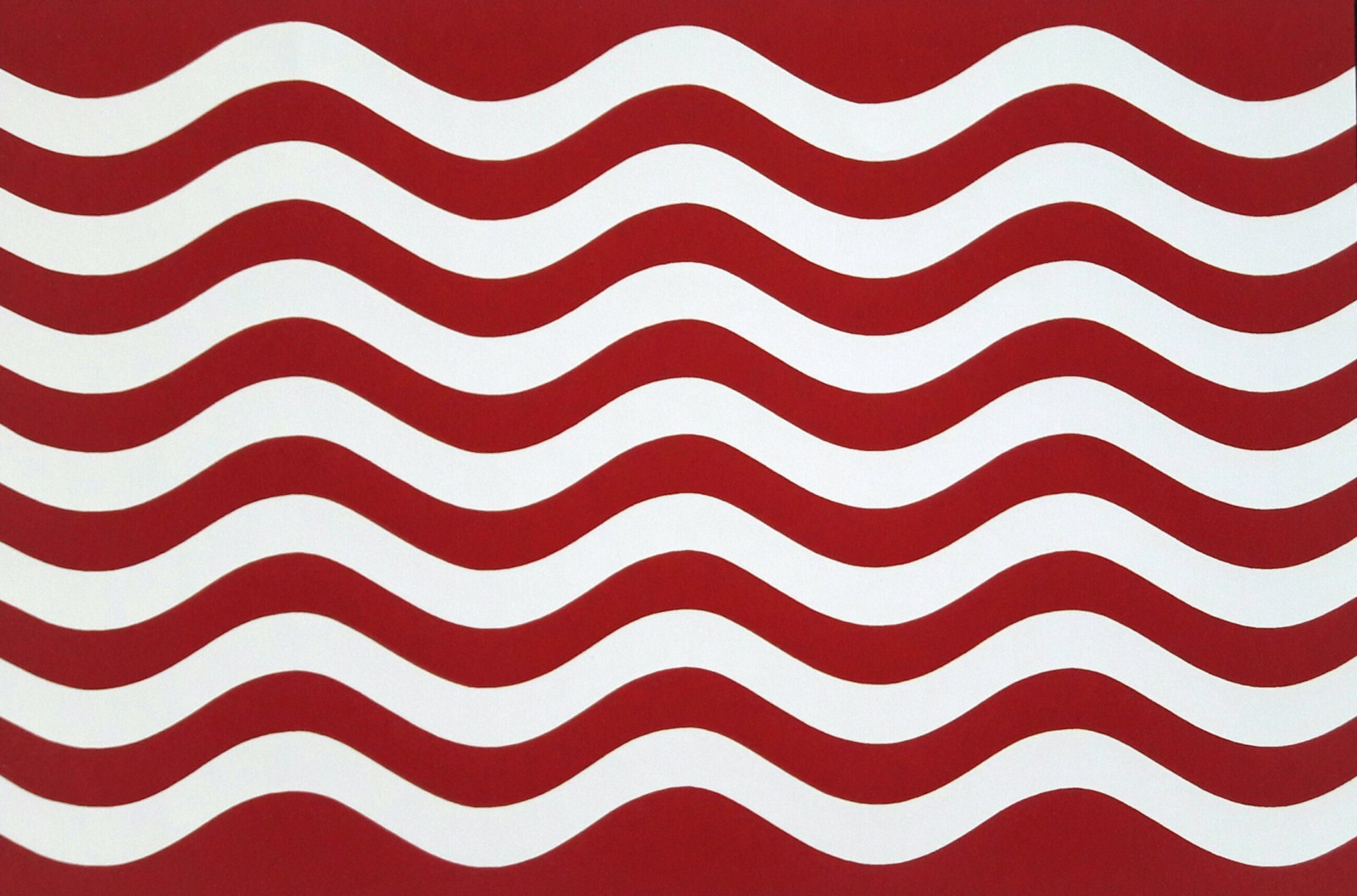
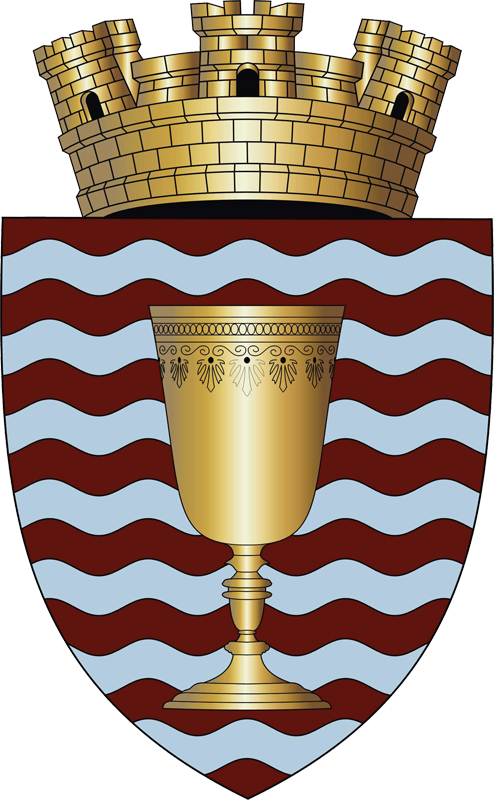
- Flag Coat of arms

- Location within Moldova
- Coordinates: 46°57′N 28°47′E
- Country: Moldova
- District: Ialoveni
- Founded: 1502

Government
  - Mayor: Ion Condrea Zimbreni (PAS)

Area
  - Total: 31.6 km^{2} (12.2 sq mi)

Population (2014)
  - Total: 15,041
  - Density: 476/km^{2} (1,230/sq mi)
- Time zone: UTC+2 (EET)
  - Summer (DST): UTC+3 (EEST)
- Postal code: MD-6801
- Area code: +373 268
- Car plates: IL
- Climate: Dfb
- Website: www.ialoveni.md

Ialoveni (Romanian pronunciation: [jaloˈvenʲ]) is a city in the Republic of Moldova situated 10 km (6 mi) from Chișinău. The city is administrative center of the Ialoveni District.

== History ==
On 25 March 1977 the settlement was renamed Kutuzov, and its status was changed to urban-type settlement. In 1989, after Moldova became independent, on citizens' demand, the municipality re-took its old name – Ialoveni. Since 7 December 1994 Ialoveni has the status of a city/town (Romanian: oraş).

== Geography ==
Ialoveni is located 35 km from the Dniester River and 10 km from Chisinau, the capital of the Republic of Moldova. It borders the localities of Costești, Mileștii Mici, Piatra Albă, Dănceni, Sociteni, Durlești and the small town of Codru.

The land area of the city is 3,165 ha, of which the area of agricultural territories is 1,678 ha, including 1,246 ha of arable land, 401 ha of vineyards and 202 ha of pastures. The water resources of the city are formed by the Ișnovăț River and 2 ponds with a total area of 18 ha.

The relief of the locality was formed after the regression of the Sarmatian Sea, which disappeared about 5 million years ago. It is varied: plains alternating with hills, valleys with ravines, slopes, plateaus. The largest valley belongs to the Ișnovăț River, which crosses the city in the direction from northwest to southwest. Comarnic Hill, which is located in the southwest part of the town, is the highest in the surroundings – 190 m.a.s.l.

The climate in the area of Ialoveni is temperate-continental, characterized by warm and long summers (average temperature in July – 20-30 °C) with low amounts of precipitation, winters with an average temperature in January – 5.5 °C.

== Demographics ==
According to the 2024 census, 14,665 inhabitants lived in Ialoveni, an increase compared to the previous census in 2014, when 12,515 inhabitants were registered.

Ethnic composition of Ialoveni (2024)
1. Moldovans (Note: There is an ongoing controversy regarding the ethnic identification of Moldovans and Romanians.) (73.5%)
2. Romanians (22.4%)
3. Ukrainians (1.50%)
4. Russians (1.30%)
5. Others (1.20%)
Linguistic composition of Ialoveni (2024)
1. Romanian (66.6%)
2. Moldovan (Note: In March 2023, the Parliament of Moldova passed a law updating all legislative texts and the constitution to refer to the national language as Romanian, effectively rendering the term "Moldovan" obsolete.) (27.2%)
3. Russian (4.60%)
4. Ukrainian (0.90%)
5. Other (0.70%)

Historical population
Year	Pop.	±%
1930	3,650	—
1979	8,240	+125.8%
1989	12,846	+55.9%
2004	15,041	+17.1%
2014	12,515	−16.8%
2024	14,665	+17.2%

== International relations ==
=== Twin towns – sister cities ===
Ialoveni is twinned with:

- Force, Italy
- Ineu, Romania
- Lesznowola, Poland
- Montefortino, Italy
- Pașcani, Romania
- Pocheon, South Korea
- Radnevo, Bulgaria
- Senec, Slovakia
- Tomești, Romania
- Topraisar, Romania
