= Gura Galbenei =

- Village
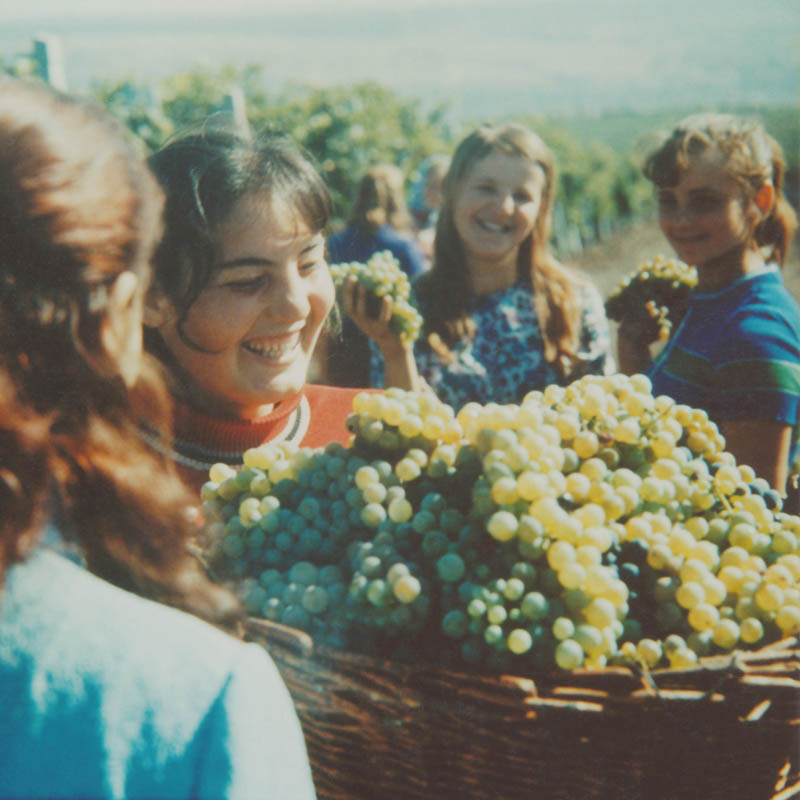

- Location within Moldova
- Coordinates: 46.6980555556°N 28.7058333333°E
- Country: Moldova
- District: Cimișlia District

Government
  - Mayor: Constantin Munteanu (Neafiliat politic)

Population (2014 census)
  - Total: 3,795
- Time zone: UTC+2 (EET)
  - Summer (DST): UTC+3 (EEST)

Gura Galbenei is a village in Cimișlia District, Moldova. Commune Gura Galbenei is situated along the river Cogâlnic and borders in the north with the village Bozieni and in the south with the village Hirtop, being a typical native place. It is an old village, dated to the 17th century.
