= Văsieni, Ialoveni =

Văsieni
- Village
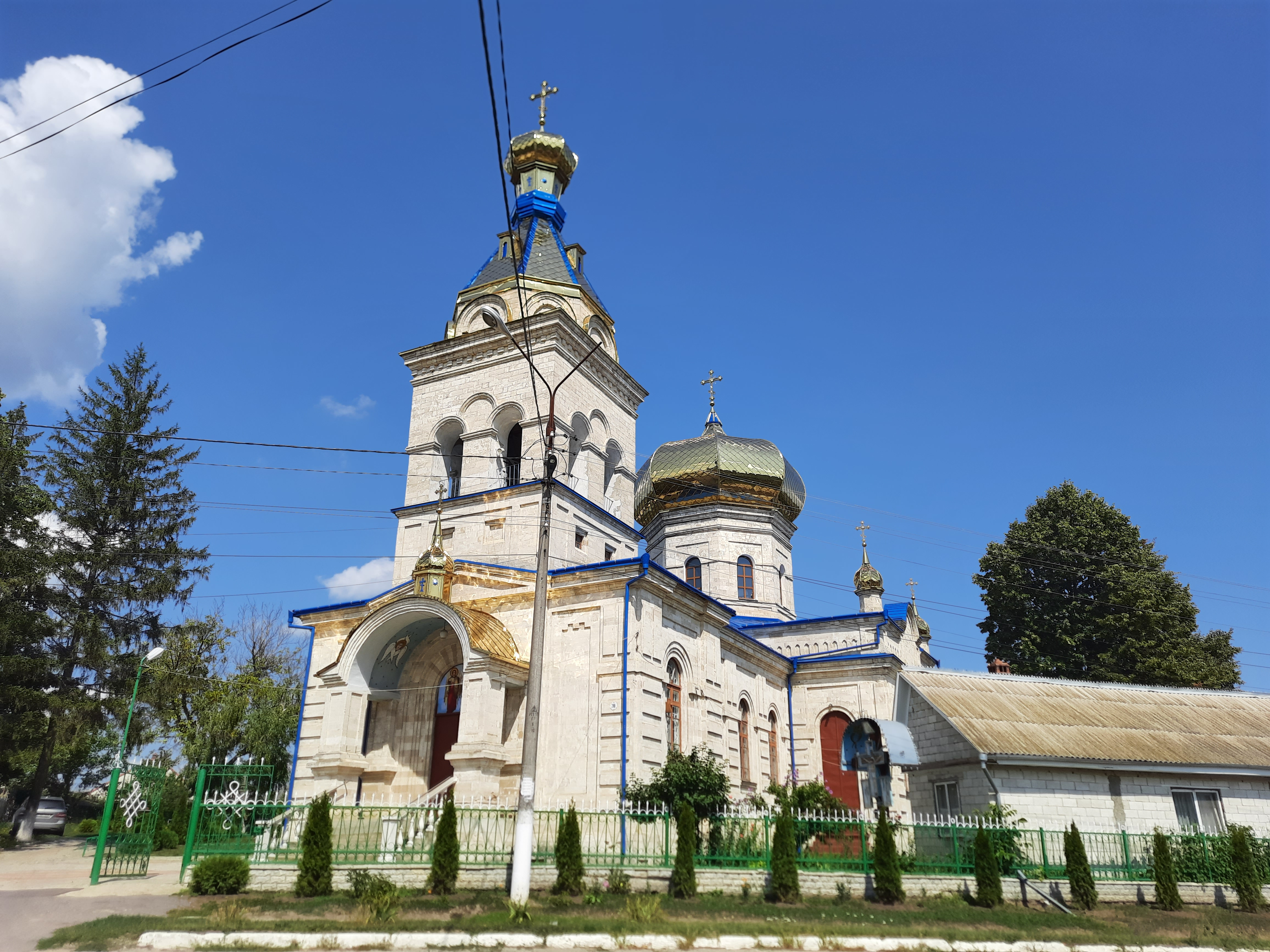

- Location within Moldova
- Coordinates: 46.9666666667°N 28.5913888889°E
- Country: Moldova

Government
  - Mayor: Sergiu Candu (PL)
- Elevation: 129 m (423 ft)

Population (2014 census)
  - Total: 3,732
- Time zone: UTC+2 (EET)
  - Summer (DST): UTC+3 (EEST)
- Postal code: MD-6830

Văsieni is a village in Ialoveni District, Moldova.
