= Sagaidac =

- Village
- Location within Moldova
- Coordinates: 46.6938888889°N 28.8497222222°E
- Country: Moldova
- District: Cimișlia District

Government
  - Mayor: Ioana Leorda (PDM)
- Elevation: 205 m (673 ft)

Population (2014 census)
  - Total: 2,050
- Time zone: UTC+2 (EET)
  - Summer (DST): UTC+3 (EEST)
- Website: http://www.sagaidac.com

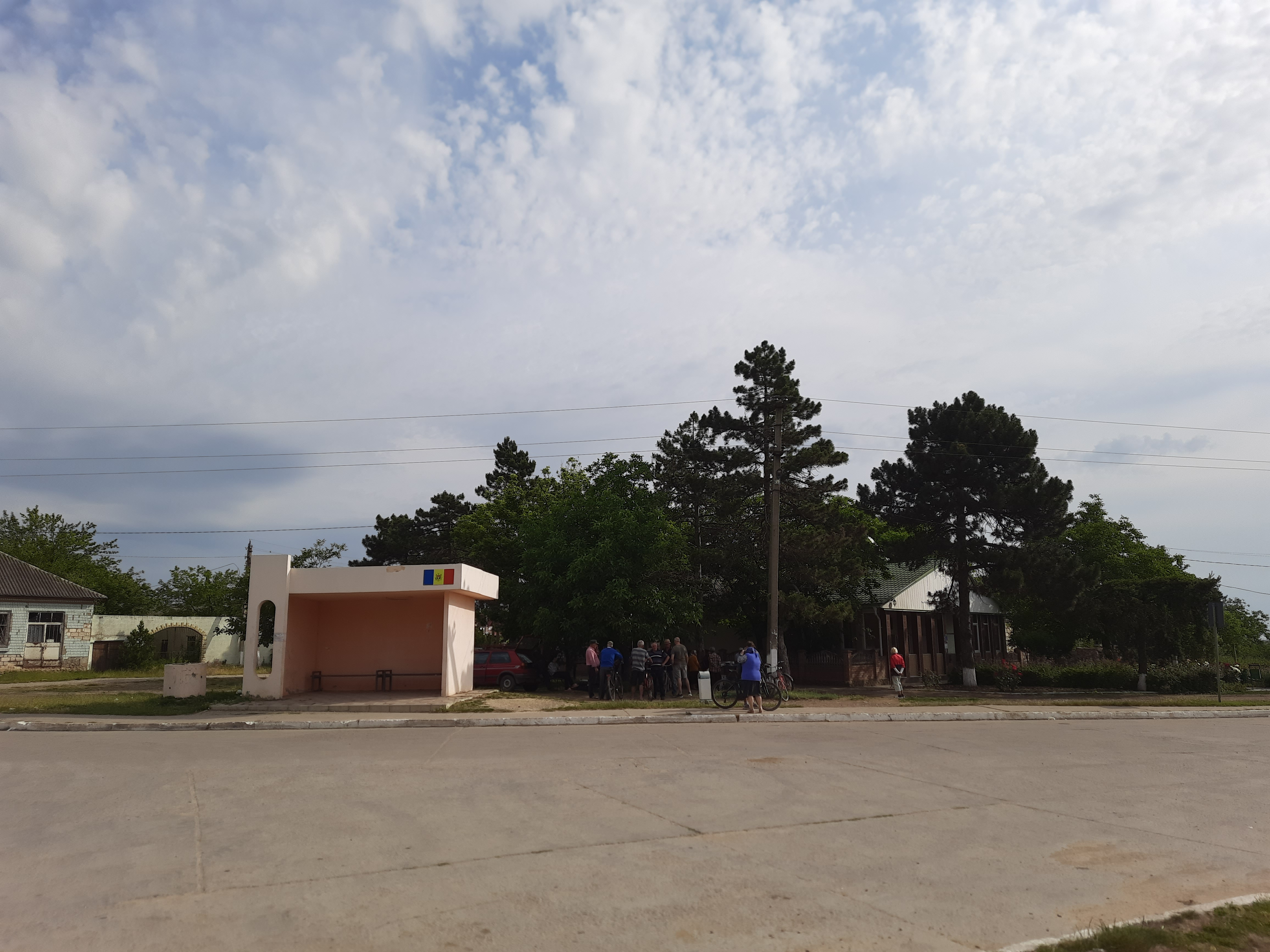

Sagaidac is a village in Cimișlia District, Moldova.
