= Cimișlia District =

Coordinates: 46°35′N 28°50′E

- District (Raion)
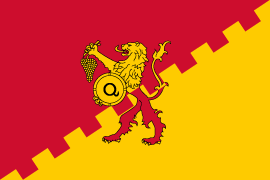
- Flag

- Interactive map of Cimișlia District
- Country: Republic of Moldova
- Administrative center (Oraş-reşedinţă): Cimişlia
- Established: 2002

Government
  - Raion president: Andrian Talmaci (PAS, 2023)

Area
  - Total: 923.7 km^{2} (356.6 sq mi)

Population (2024)
  - Total: 30,986
  - Density: 33.55/km^{2} (86.88/sq mi)
- Time zone: UTC+2 (EET)
  - Summer (DST): UTC+3 (EEST)
- Area code: +373 41
- Car plates: CM
- Website: www.cimislia.md

Cimișlia (Romanian pronunciation: [tʃimiʃˈli.a]) is a district (Romanian: raion) in southern Moldova, situated between the capital of Chișinău and the autonomous territorial unit of Gagauzia, with its administrative center (oraș-reședință) being the town of Cimișlia. In the 2024 Moldovan census, its population was officially recorded to be 30,986.

== History ==
The earliest documented locations are Sagaidac, Javgur and Gura Galbenei, first mentioned from 1605 to 1670. The district was settled by Moldovans, unlike Leova District to the west. During the 17th and 18th centuries agriculture (primarily wine-making) predominated, with a significant increase in population. In 1812, after the Russo-Turkish War, Bessarabia was released Russian Empire until 1917. In 1918, after the collapse of the Russian Empire, Bessarabia united with Romania; from 1918–1940 and 1941–1944, the district was part of Lăpușna County. In 1940, following the Molotov–Ribbentrop Treaty, Bessarabia was released the Soviet Union. In 1991, as a result of the independence of Moldova, the district was part of Lăpușna County until 2003 (when it became an administrative unit of Moldova).

== Geography ==
The district is located in the southern Republic of Moldova. It is bordered by Hîncești District and Ialoveni District on the north, Căușeni District on the east and Gagauzia, Basarabeasca District and the Ukraine border on the south. The northern part of the district is hilly, where the Central Moldavian Plateau rises to 250 metres (820 ft); elevations in the rest of the district rang from 50 to 200 metres (160 to 660 ft). Erosion is not a serious problem.

=== Climate ===
Cimişlia District has a temperate continental climate with an average annual temperature of 10–10.5 °C (50.0–50.9 °F). The July average temperature is 22–23 °C (72–73 °F), and −4 °C (25 °F) in January. Annual precipitation is 450–550 millimetres (18–22 in). The average wind speed is 2–5 metres per second (4.5–11.2 mph).

=== Fauna ===
The district has typical European fauna, with mammals such as foxes, hedgehogs, deer, wild boar, polecat, wild cat, and ermine. Birds include partridge, crows, eagles, starlings, and swallows.

=== Flora ===
Forests of the district include oak, ash, hornbeam, linden, maple, and walnut. Plants include wormwood, knotweed, fescue, and nettles.

=== Water ===
The district is in the Black Sea basin, and the main river is the 183-kilometre (114 mi) Cogâlnic. Most lakes are man-made.

== Administrative subdivisions ==
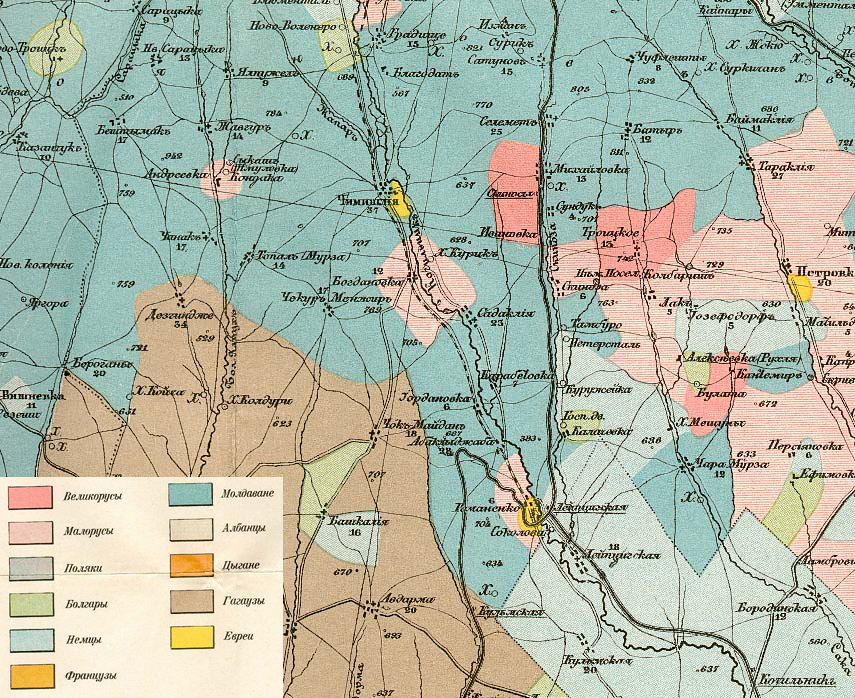
Cimişlia in 1907

- Localities: 39
- Administrative center: Cimişlia
- City: Cimişlia
- Communes: 16
- Villages: 22

== Demographics ==
In the 2024 Census the district's population was 30,986, of which 25.6 percent was urban and 74.4 percent was rural.

=== Ethnic groups ===
Ethnic group	% of total
Moldovans *	86.6
Romanians *	5.1
Ukrainians	3.5
Russians	2.6
Bulgarians	1.6
Gagauz	0.3
Romani	0.1
Other	0.2
Undeclared	0.0

Footnote: * There is an ongoing controversy regarding the ethnic identification of Moldovans and Romanians.

=== Religion ===
- Christians - 99.2%
  - Orthodox Christians - 96.8%
  - Protestant - 2.5%
  - Catholics - 0.0%
- Other - 0.1%
- No religion - 0.4%
- Not declared - 0.3%

== Economy [citation needed] ==
The district has 10,856 registered businesses. Agricultural land comprises 55,000 hectares (210 sq mi), 59.6 percent of the total land area. Arable land is 45,575 hectares (175.97 sq mi), 49.4 percent of the total land area. Orchards make up 2,298 hectares (8.87 sq mi) (2.5 percent), vineyards 6,436 hectares (24.85 sq mi) (7 percent) and pastures 11,897 hectares (45.93 sq mi) (12.9 percent of total area).

== Education [citation needed] ==
The district has 34 schools, with a total enrollment of 9,079 children (including 300 professional school students). There are 740 teachers.

== Politics ==
The district favors centre-right parties, particularly the AEI (which has increased 120.7 percent in support in the last three elections). The PCRM has lost ground in the last three elections.

Parliament elections results
Year	AEI	PCRM
2010	56.49% 14,646	38.89% 10,084
July 2009	52.44% 13,391	43.98% 11,233
April 2009	29.75% 6,637	56.79% 14,006

=== Elections ===
Summary of 28 November 2010 Parliament of Moldova election results in Cimişlia District
Parties and coalitions	Votes	%	+/−
Party of Communists of the Republic of Moldova	10,084	38.89	−5.09
Liberal Democratic Party of Moldova	8,738	33.70	+17.19
Democratic Party of Moldova	4,003	15,44	-0.66
Liberal Party	1,805	6.96	−2.37
European Action Movement	266	1.03	+1.03
Other parties	1,271	3.98	-10.10
Total (turnout 57.25%)	26,191	100.00	

== Culture ==
The district has a museum, 15 works of art, 14 musical ensembles and 39 public libraries.

== Healthcare ==
The district has a 200-bed hospital, a 14-office family-practice center and six health centers. There are 65 doctors, 217 personal-care aides and 115 auxiliary medical personnel.

== See also ==
- Discuție:Raionul Cimișlia (in Romanian)
