= Ialoveni District =

Coordinates: 46°50′N 28°50′E

Ialoveni
- District (Raion)
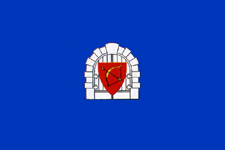
- Flag

- Country: Moldova
- Administrative center (Oraş-reşedinţă): Ialoveni
- Established: 2002

Government
  - Raion President: Natalia Eremia (2023) (PAS)

Area
  - Total: 783.5 km^{2} (302.5 sq mi)
  - Water: 25.6 km^{2} (9.9 sq mi) 2.27%

Population (2024)
  - Total: 74,458
  - Density: 95.03/km^{2} (246.1/sq mi)
- Time zone: UTC+2 (EET)
  - Summer (DST): UTC+3 (EEST)
- Area code: +373 268
- Car plates: IL
- Website: www.ialoveni.md

Ialoveni (Romanian pronunciation: [jaloˈvenʲ]) is a district (Romanian: raion) in the central part of Moldova, with the administrative center at Ialoveni. As of the 2024 Moldovan census, its population was 74,458.

== History ==
The localities with the oldest documentary attestation in the district are Bardar, Puhoi, Molești, and Răzeni; these localities were mentioned for the first time in the period 1443–1485. The 16th to 18th centuries witnessed the development of the economy (agriculture and winery) and culture (several monasteries were built), as Bessarabia's population grew. After the Russo-Turkish War (1806–1812), the region was annexed by the Russian Empire, and became part of the Bessarabia Governorate from 1812 to 1917, there is an intense russification of the native population. In 1918, after the Russian Revolution and the collapse of the Russian Empire, Bessarabia united with Romania. From 1918 to 1940 and again from 1941 to 1944, the district was part of the Lăpușna County, in the Kingdom of Romania. In 1940, after the Molotov–Ribbentrop Pact, Bessarabia was occupied by the Soviet Union. Towards the end of World War II, the district became part of the Moldavian SSR. In 1991, as a result of the proclamation of Independence of Moldova, it became part and residence of Chișinău County (1991–2003), and in 2003 it became an administrative unit of Moldova.

== Geography ==
Ialoveni district is located in the central part of the Republic of Moldova. Neighborhood has the following district: Strășeni District and Chișinău Municipality in north, Anenii Noi District in the east, districts of Căușeni and Cimislia in the south, and Hîncești District in the west. The landscape is varied, from slippery and hilly in the northwest (Central Moldavian Plateau), until smooth and plain in the east (valley of the Botna River). Erosion processes vary in intensity. In structure, the soil contains considerable amounts of humus district, very rich. In the village Mileștii Mici is a mine of stone, where annually about 200,000 cubic meters are extracted construction materials. Space left by the extraction of stone used in the wine industry.

=== Climate ===
The climate is temperate continental. Summer is warm and long, with average July temperature 22 °C (72 °F) and a maximum of 36 °C (97 °F), winter is mild, with average temperature in January of −4 °C (25 °F) and a minimum of −24 °C (−11 °F). Yearly precipitation 450–600 mm (18–24 in). The average wind speed is 3–6 m/s (9.8–19.7 ft/s).

=== Fauna ===
The fauna is typical of central Europe. There are mammals such as foxes, hedgehogs, deer, wild boar, ermine, ferret, and more. Birds include: owl, stork, hawk, sparrow, starling, crow, egret, partridges, and others.

=== Flora ===
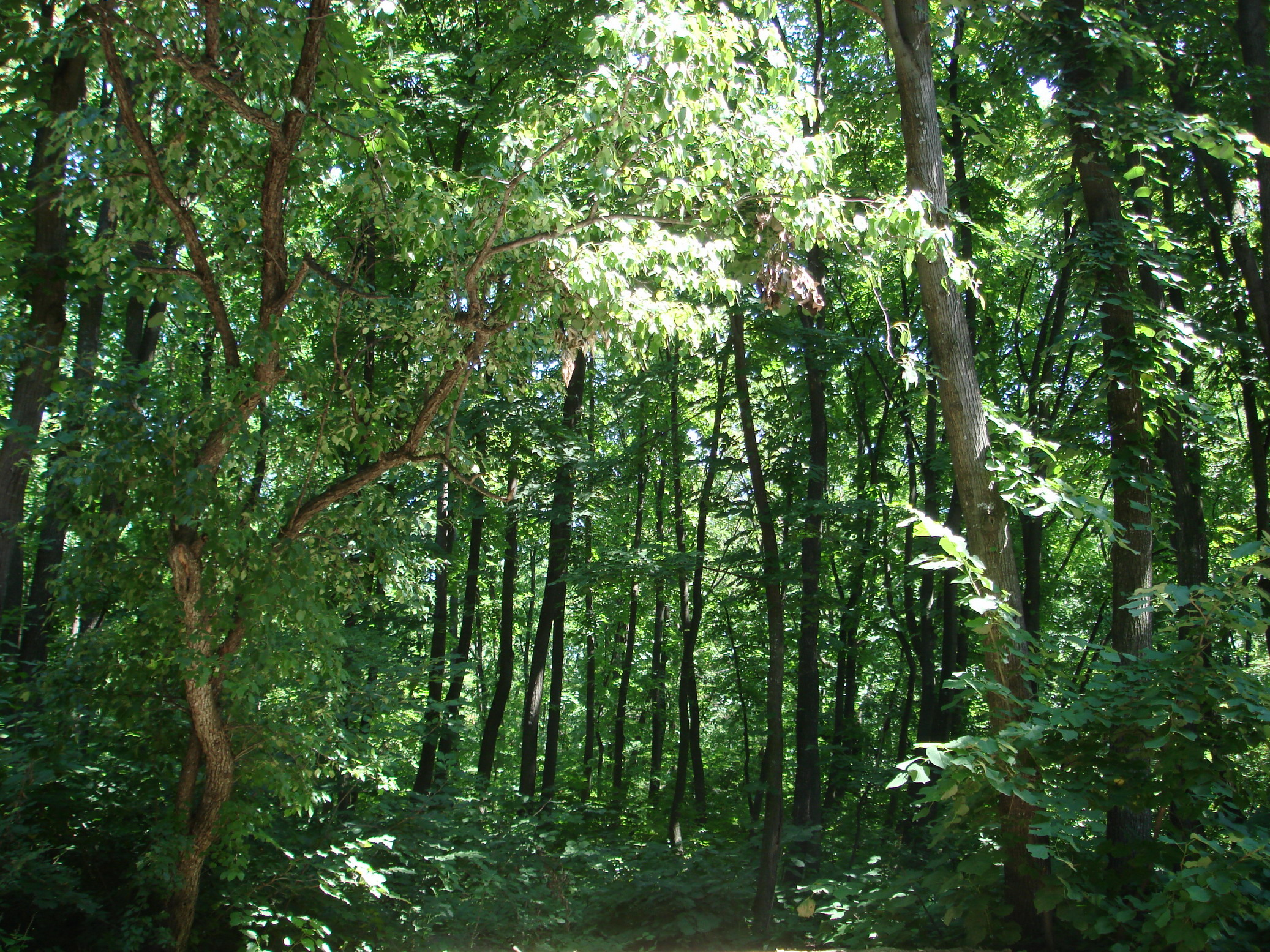
Forest in Ialoveni district

Forests occupy 18.3% of the district; they are complemented by oak, english oak, hornbeam, maple, linden, ash, and other trees. Plants include: wormwood, black, clover, knotweed, nettle, fescue, and more.

=== Rivers ===
The district is located in the basin of the Nistru River and two of its tributaries: the Botna River (152 km) and the Ișnovăț River (59 km). There are also more than a hundred water bodies, half of which are stocked with fish.

== Administrative subdivisions ==
- Localities: 34
  - Administrative center: Ialoveni
    - Cities: Ialoveni
      - Communes: 24
        - Villages: 32

== Demographics ==
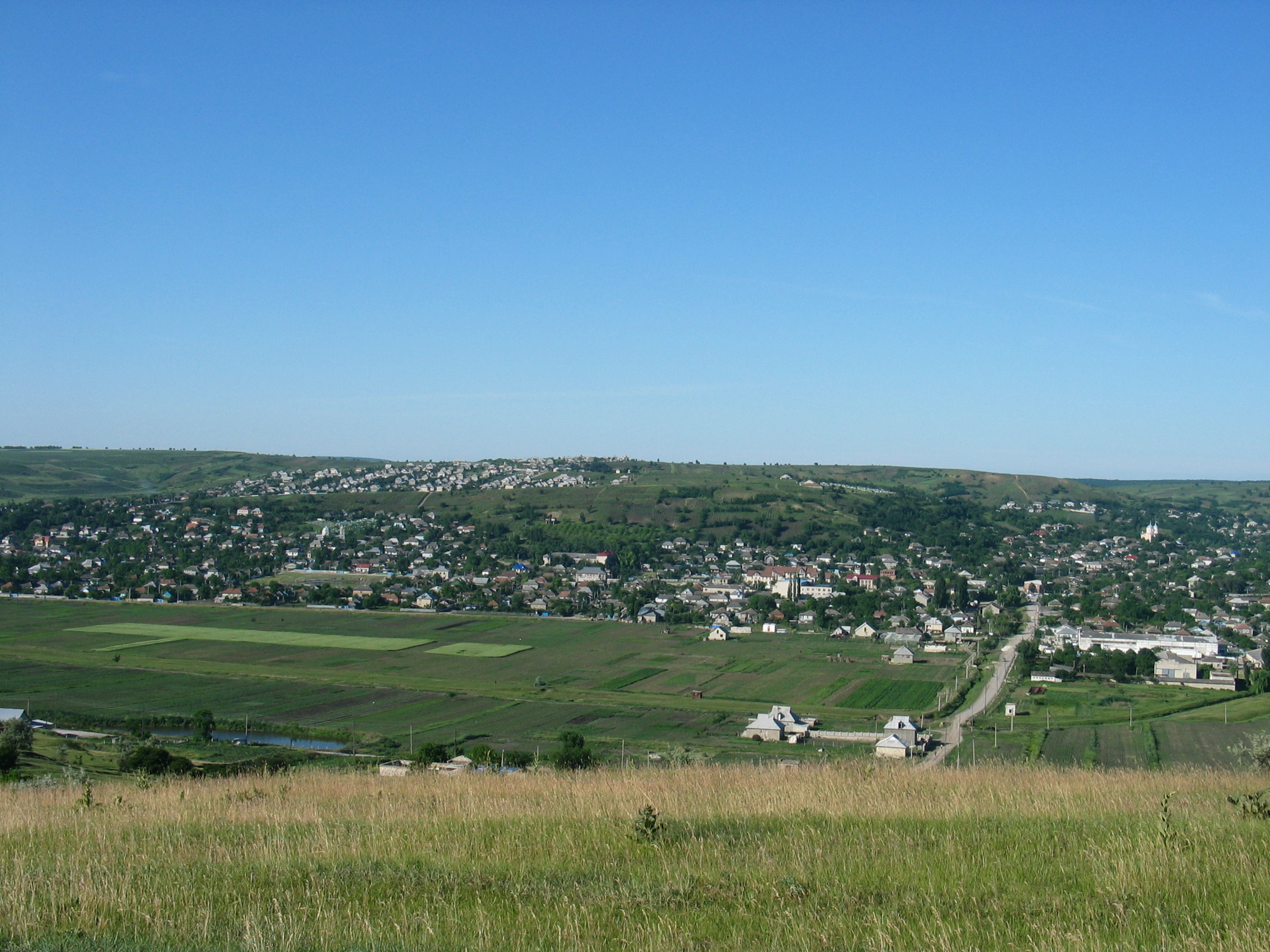
Costești (population: 11,967)

On the 2024 Census, the district population was 74,458, of which 19.7% urban and 80.3% rural population.

=== Ethnic groups ===
Ethnic group	% of total
Moldovans *	80.7
Romanians *	15.6
Ukrainians	1.8
Bulgarians	0.7
Russians	0.5
Romani	0.4
Gagauz	0.1
Other	0.2
Undeclared	0.1

Footnote: * There is an ongoing controversy regarding the ethnic identification of Moldovans and Romanians.

=== Religion ===
- Christians - 98.9%
  - Orthodox Christians - 97.5%
  - Protestant - 1.4%
- Other - 0.2%
- No Religion - 0.4%
- Not Declared - 0.5%

== Economy ==
In Ialoveni District, there are 19,802 registered businesses. Of those, about 50 businesses operate in trade, three companies in transport and telecommunications, and the national telephone operator operating here is Moldtelecom. 60% are private property, 39% are public property and the other 1% are mixed ownership.

The land of Ialoveni District on 1 January 2008 outside the 25 administrative units is distributed as follows: regional first level, covers an area of 78,348 ha, including arable land - 33,431 ha (42.7%), orchards - 3,727 ha (4.8% ), vineyards 7,942 ha (10.2%), pastures - 7,310 ha (9.4%), other land - 8,700 ha (11.1%).

== Sport ==
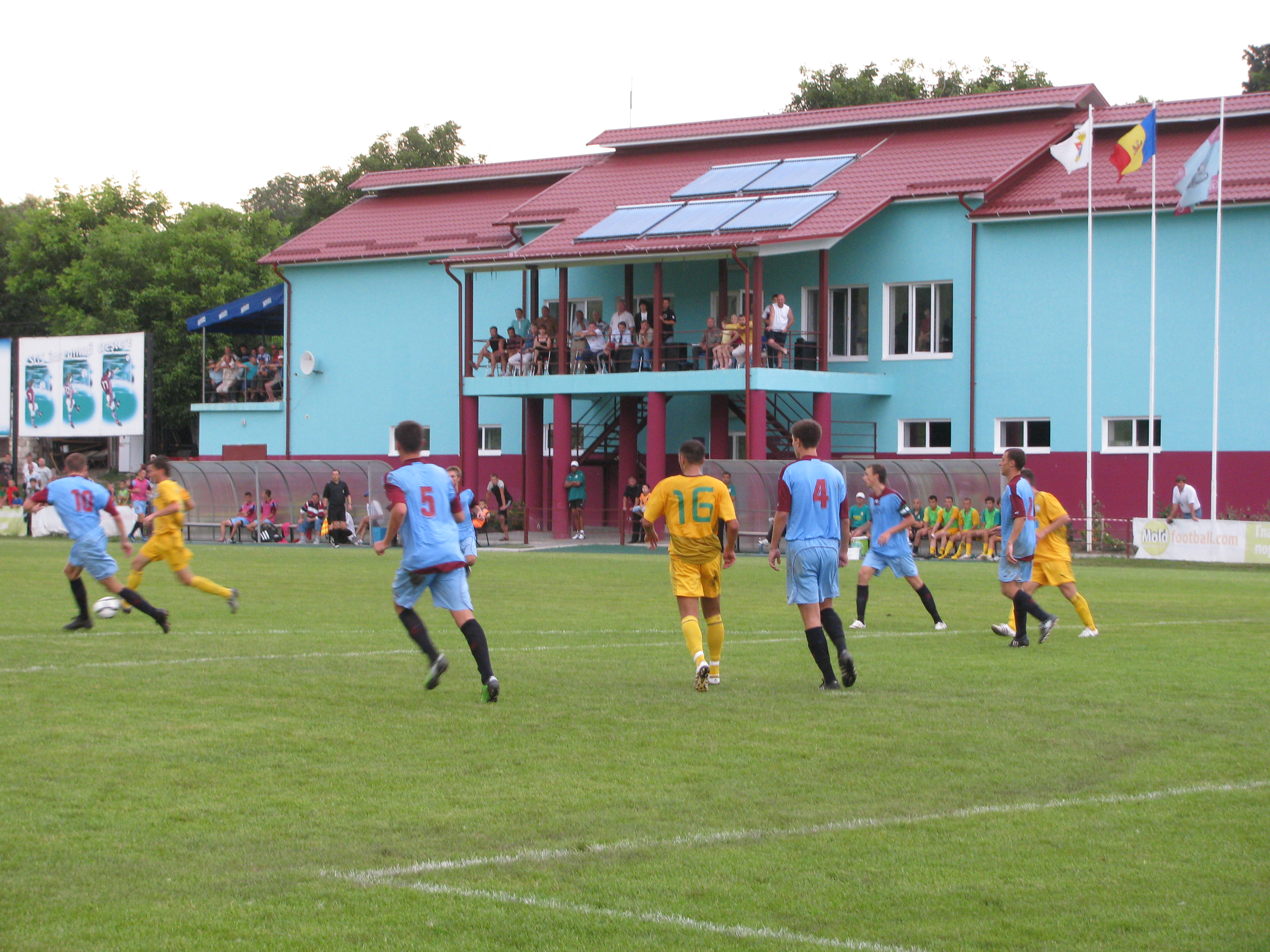
Suruceni Stadium

Ialoveni district has a developed sport infrastructure. All localities have sports stadiums such as football, wrestling rooms, the annual practice rounds of cycling, distance running and different. A young generation is given importance, gyms are open.

== Education ==
The district operates 68 educational institutions, including primary schools, secondary schools, high schools - 37 (number of students - 1,362), preschool - 29 (3,416 children), vocational schools - 2 (563 students), teachers - 1,258.

== Politics ==
Traditional Ialoveni district, political and electoral support, right-wing parties, particularly AEI. PCRM is a continues fall percentage.

During the last three elections AEI, had an increase of 47.1%.

Parliament elections results
Year	AEI	PCRM
2010	71.87% 34,958	23.52% 11,435
July 2009	71.67% 33,208	25.02% 11,591
April 2009	54.18% 23,765	33.86% 14,854

=== Elections ===
Summary of 28 November 2010 Parliament of Moldova election results in Ialoveni District
Parties and coalitions	Votes	%	+/−
Liberal Democratic Party of Moldova	20,465	42.08	+17.26
Party of Communists of the Republic of Moldova	11,435	23.52	−1.50
Liberal Party	7,953	16.35	−6.81
Democratic Party of Moldova	5,400	11,10	-0.81
Party Alliance Our Moldova	1,140	2.34	−9.47
Other Party	2,257	4.61	+1.30
Total (turnout 62.39%)	48,991	100.00	

== Culture ==
The district operates: a museum, 23 houses of culture, 34 libraries, 57 artistic works, including 12 bands as "model".

== Health ==
The district works: a hospital - with 132 beds, a Center of Family Physician's - with 6 offices of family doctor's, 15 health centers, 11 branch offices of family doctors.

== Tourism ==
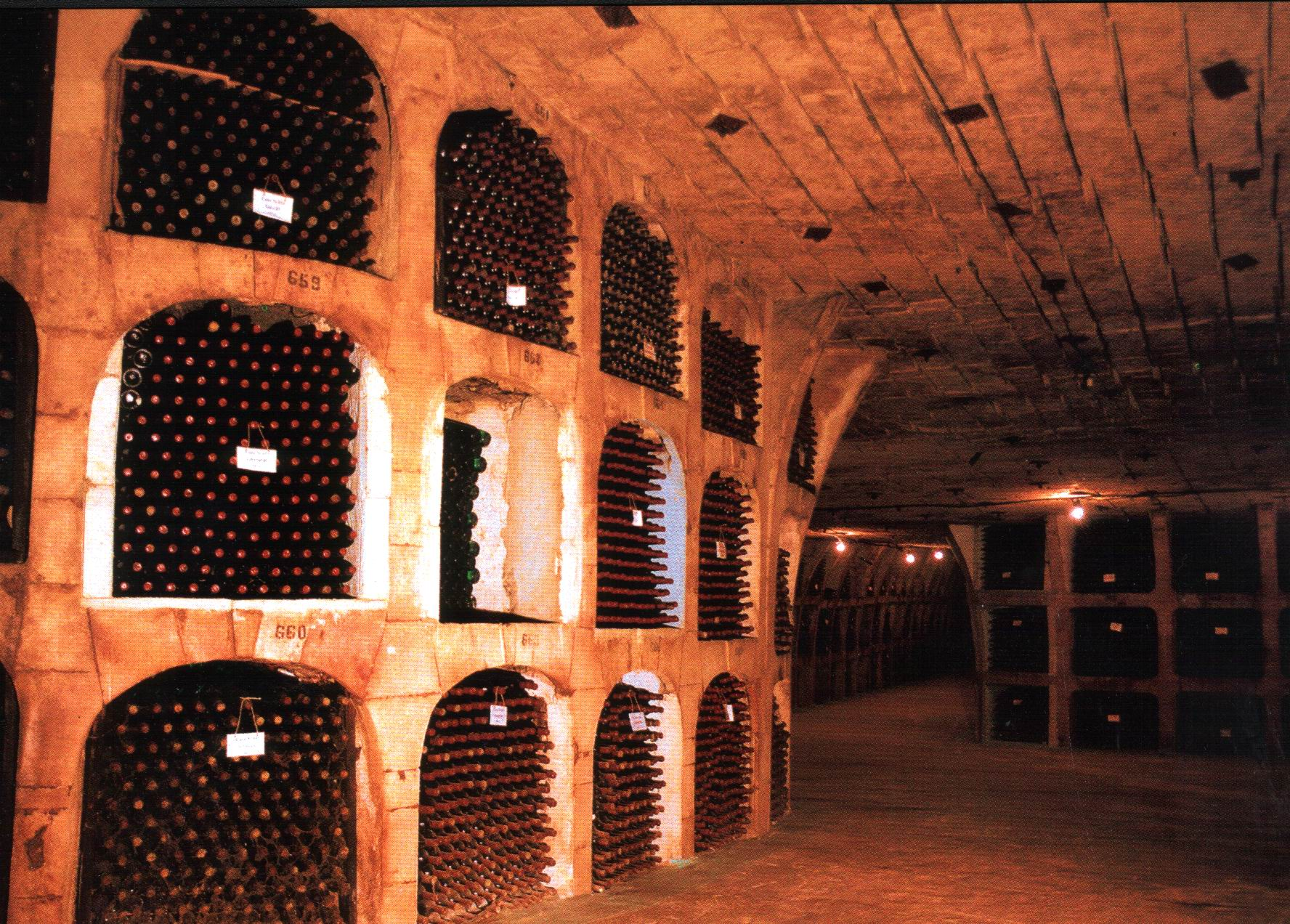
Mileștii Mici (winery) - biggest wine collection of Europe (included in Guinness Book of Records)

- Wine Collection (Golden Collection) of the Milestii Mici. It entered the Guinness Book of Records as the largest wine collection in Europe with over 1.5 million bottles of collection. The total number of bottles present in the cellars of Milestii Mici exceed 2 million. The complex of galleries (cellars) of the Milestii Mici is itself the largest in Europe, stretching nearly 250 km, of which only 120 km are used. The wines stored here are 70% red wine, white wine with only 20% and 10% of dessert wines. The most valuable present in the collection bottle of wine was produced in 1973 and worth €480.
- Fireplaces craftsmen from Ulmu and Vasieni: here visitors can get acquainted with old traditions of craftsmen in embroidery, crochet, craft.
- Valley of Botna - area folk, ethno-folk with 11 bands (songs and dances, folk customs, etc.).
- Resorts "Golden Fish" - the company Fisheries Costesti (summer cottages, hotel, restaurant, recreation area, musicians etc.).
- Suruceni Monastery (built in 19th century Moldavian architectural style);
- BardarZooClub is one of the biggest zoo's in Moldova, and unlike the traditional zoo's, here guests can actually touch and feed the animals.
- Museum of History and Ethnography of the Vasieni (here you can learn about the history of the district, represented by artifacts and handicrafts).
- If you're a fan of flowers, during April you can find 40 acres of tulip plantation in Bardarvillage, it's the biggest in Moldova.
