= List of localities in Moldova inhabited by Romani people =

This is a list of localities in Moldova inhabited by Romani people (in Romanian: romi, țigani), according to the data of 2004 Moldovan census.

#	Settlement type	Locality name	District	Nr. of Romani	% Romani	Total population
1	City/town	Otaci	Ocnița District	3 380	40	8 469
2	City/town	Soroca	Soroca District	1 525	5	28 362
3	Village	Vulcănești	Nisporeni District	1 057	86	1 224
4	City/town	Rîșcani	Rîșcani District	562	5	11 104
5	City/town	Edineț	Edineț District	490	3	15 624
6	City/town	Chișinău	Chișinău Municipality	273	0	589 445
7	City/town	Bălți	Bălți Municipality	272	0	122 669
8	Village	Ursari	Călărași District	233	82	285
9	City/town	Briceni	Briceni District	185	2	8 765
10	Village	Danu	Glodeni District	167	5	3 063
11	City/town	Ceadir-Lunga	Comrat Municipality	166	1	19 401
12	City/town	Basarabeasca	Basarabeasca District	165	1	11 192
13	City/town	Orhei	Orhei District	151	1	25 641
14	Village	Talmaza	Ștefan Vodă District	139	2	7 250
15	Village	Zirnești	Cahul District	120	6	1 908
16	City/town	Comrat	Comrat Municipality	108	0	23 327
17	City/town	Taraclia	Taraclia District	99	1	13 756
18	City/town	Hîncești	Hîncești District	92	1	15 281
19	City/town	Călărași	Călărași District	90	1	14 516
20	City/town	Vatra	Chișinău Municipality	87	3	3 296
21	Village	Gribova	Drochia District	81	4	2 175
22	Village	Cărpineni	Hîncești District	71	1	9 954
23	Village	Suruceni	Ialoveni District	66	2	2 791
24	Village	Mihailovca	Cimișlia District	59	2	3 371
25	Village	Dușmani	Glodeni District	58	3	2 000
26	Village	Raspopeni	Șoldănești District	57	2	2 775
27	City/town	Florești	Florești District	55	0	13 164
28	City/town	Fălești	Fălești District	52	0	14 931
29	Village	Varnița	Anenii Noi District	50	1	4 210
30	City/town	Durlești	Chișinău Municipality	48	0	15 395
31	Village	Maramonovca	Drochia District	48	2	2 666
32	Village	Boldurești	Nisporeni District	48	1	3 350
33	Village	Tirnova	Dondușeni District	39	1	4 293
34	Village	Tvardita	Taraclia District	39	1	5 882
35	Village	Geamana	Anenii Noi District	37	1	3 401
36	Village	Mingir	Hîncești District	37	1	4 995
37	Village	Purcari	Ștefan Vodă District	36	2	2 253
38	City/town	Anenii Noi	Anenii Noi District	34	0	8 358
39	Village	Corten	Taraclia District	34	1	3 407
40	Village	Pirlita	Ungheni District	34	1	4 474
41	Village	Drochia	Drochia District	33	1	2 843
42	City/town	Glodeni	Glodeni District	33	0	10 465
43	Village	Copceac	Comrat Municipality	33	0	9 551
44	City/town	Ialoveni	Ialoveni District	30	0	15 041
45	City/town	Cricova	Chișinău Municipality	29	0	9 878
46	Village	Ciocilteni	Orhei District	28	1	2 287
47	Village	Tomai	Comrat Municipality	28	1	5 014
48	City/town	Nisporeni	Nisporeni District	26	0	12 105
49	Village	Badiceni	Soroca District	25	1	3 238
50	Village	Avdarma	Comrat Municipality	25	1	3 564
51	Village	Cania	Cantemir District	24	1	2 816
52	Village	Frumusica	Florești District	24	2	1 558
53	City/town	Leova	Leova District	24	0	10 027
54	City/town	Cahul	Cahul District	23	0	35 488
55	Village	Congaz	Comrat Municipality	23	0	12 327
56	Village	Tintareni	Anenii Noi District	22	1	2 867
57	Village	Iserlia	Basarabeasca District	22	2	884
58	City/town	Cimișlia	Cimișlia District	22	0	12 858
59	Village	Ochiul Alb	Drochia District	22	1	3 089
60	Village	Baroncea	Drochia District	21	1	1 461
61	Village	Alexandreni	Sîngerei District	21	1	1 476
62	Village	Telita	Anenii Noi District	20	2	1 187
63	Village	Valcinet	Călărași District	20	0	4 165
64	Village	Hijdieni	Glodeni District	20	1	3 765
65	Village	Paustova	Ocnița District	20	2	951
66	Village	Cajba	Glodeni District	19	1	1 671
67	Village	Sarata-Galbena	Hîncești District	19	0	4 790
68	Village	Novosiolovca	Taraclia District	19	1	1 289
69	Village	Boscana	Criuleni District	18	1	2 729
70	Village	Cazangic	Leova District	18	2	961
71	Village	Mihaileni	Rîșcani District	18	0	4 465
72	Village	Chiriet-Lunga	Comrat Municipality	18	1	2 498
73	Village	Crihana Veche	Cahul District	17	0	4 189
74	Village	Coroliovca	Hîncești District	17	19	91
75	Village	Bubuieci	Chișinău Municipality	16	0	5 444
76	Village	Cobusca Nouă	Anenii Noi District	16	1	1 701
77	Village	Salcuta	Căușeni District	16	0	4 496
78	Village	Costești	Ialoveni District	16	0	11 128
79	Village	Malcoci	Ialoveni District	16	1	2 448
80	Village	Sculeni	Ungheni District	16	1	2 792
81	Village	Cioc-Maidan	Comrat Municipality	16	0	3 926
82	Village	Truseni	Chișinău Municipality	15	0	7 546
83	Village	Carabetovka	Basarabeasca District	15	1	1 840
84	Village	Colibasi	Cahul District	15	0	6 021
85	Village	Caprești	Florești District	15	2	837
86	Village	Baurci	Comrat Municipality	15	0	8 783
87	Village	Gavanoasa	Cahul District	14	1	1 296
88	Village	Buda	Călărași District	14	2	799
89	Village	Onitcani	Criuleni District	14	1	2 089
90	Village	Baraboi	Dondușeni District	14	0	3 354
91	Village	Sociteni	Ialoveni District	14	1	1 450
92	Village	Cubolta	Sîngerei District	14	1	1 997
93	City/town	Strășeni	Strășeni District	14	0	18 320
94	City/town	Ungheni	Ungheni District	14	0	32 530
95	Village	Sofia	Drochia District	13	0	4 823
96	City/town	Vulcănești	Comrat Municipality	13	0	15 462
97	Village	Ruseni	Anenii Noi District	12	1	1 090
98	Village	Bardar	Ialoveni District	12	0	5 010
99	Village	Danceni	Ialoveni District	12	0	2 796
100	Village	Brănești	Orhei District	12	0	2 486
101	Village	Gaidar	Comrat Municipality	12	0	4 525
102	Village	Slobozia Mare	Cahul District	11	0	5 960
103	City/town	Cantemir	Cantemir District	11	0	3 872
104	Village	Sarata Nouă	Leova District	11	1	1 476
105	Village	Tomaiul Nou	Leova District	11	3	419
106	Village	Varzarești	Nisporeni District	11	0	4 916
107	Village	Stauceni	Chișinău Municipality	10	0	6 204
108	Village	Merenii Noi	Anenii Noi District	10	1	1 512
109	Village	Izvoare	Florești District	10	1	991
110	City/town	Ocnița	Ocnița District	10	0	9 325
111	Village	Teleseu	Orhei District	10	1	1 344
112	Village	Nihoreni	Rîșcani District	10	0	3 272
113	Village	Valea Perjei	Taraclia District	10	0	4 986
114	Village	Hirtop	Cimișlia District	9	0	2 011
115	Village	Horodiste	Dondușeni District	9	1	1 075
116	Village	Suri	Drochia District	9	0	3 964
117	Village	Negrea	Hîncești District	9	0	1 985
118	Village	Pascani	Hîncești District	9	1	1 464
119	Village	Puhoi	Ialoveni District	9	0	5 542
120	Village	Cneazevca	Leova District	9	1	948
121	Village	Palanca	Ștefan Vodă District	9	0	2 020
122	Village	Rascaieti	Ștefan Vodă District	9	0	2 930
123	Village	Volintiri	Ștefan Vodă District	9	0	4 057
124	Village	Chirsova	Comrat Municipality	9	0	6 861
125	City/town	Codru	Chișinău Municipality	8	0	14 277
126	City/town	Vadul Lui Voda	Chișinău Municipality	8	0	4 559
127	Village	Goian	Chișinău Municipality	8	1	1 105
128	Village	Lucești	Cahul District	8	1	650
129	City/town	Căușeni	Căușeni District	8	0	17 757
130	Village	Mindic	Drochia District	8	0	3 402
131	Village	Vozneseni	Leova District	8	1	705
132	Village	Ciniseuti	Rezina District	8	0	2 734
133	Village	Malinovscoe	Rîșcani District	8	1	1 246
134	Village	Lipovanca	Sîngerei District	8	6	124
135	Village	Cairaclia	Taraclia District	8	0	2 124
136	Village	Gura Bicului	Anenii Noi District	7	0	3 427
137	Village	Sadaclia	Basarabeasca District	7	0	4 389
138	Village	Cislita-Prut	Cahul District	7	1	1 271
139	Village	Selistea Nouă	Călărași District	7	1	1 393
140	City/town	Cupcini	Edineț District	7	0	7 441
141	Village	Bozieni	Hîncești District	7	0	1 986
142	Village	Rusca	Hîncești District	7	2	425
143	Village	Carpineanca	Hîncești District	7	4	199
144	Village	Peresecina	Orhei District	7	0	7 430
145	Village	Seliste	Orhei District	7	0	2 157
146	Village	Valea lui Vlad	Sîngerei District	7	2	408
147	Village	Cusmirca	Șoldănești District	7	0	2 427
148	Village	Recești	Șoldănești District	7	2	392
149	Village	Todirești	Anenii Noi District	6	0	1 843
150	Village	Porumbești	Cantemir District	6	0	1 648
151	Village	Palanca	Călărași District	6	1	956
152	Village	Tuzara	Călărași District	6	1	803
153	Village	Petreni	Drochia District	6	1	1 077
154	Village	Tarigrad	Drochia District	6	0	4 655
155	Village	Razeni	Ialoveni District	6	0	6 905
156	Village	Tipala	Ialoveni District	6	0	3 609
157	Village	Tomai	Leova District	6	0	3 389
158	Village	Birladeni	Ocnița District	6	1	735
159	Village	Joltai	Comrat Municipality	6	0	2 278
160	Village	Bulboaca	Anenii Noi District	5	0	5 095
161	Village	Chetrosu	Anenii Noi District	5	0	1 974
162	Village	Tatarești	Cahul District	5	0	2 156
163	Village	Donduseni	Dondușeni District	5	0	1 695
164	Village	Chetrosu	Drochia District	5	0	5 325
165	Village	Dominteni	Drochia District	5	0	1 402
166	Village	Miciurin	Drochia District	5	0	1 608
167	Village	Nicoreni	Drochia District	5	0	3 420
168	Village	Leuseni	Hîncești District	5	0	2 166
169	Village	Piatra Alba	Ialoveni District	5	1	704
170	Village	Crocmaz	Ștefan Vodă District	5	0	3 002
171	Village	Tintareni	Telenești District	5	0	1 890
172	Village	Besalma	Comrat Municipality	5	0	4 441
173	Village	Carabiber	Basarabeasca District	4	5	82
174	Village	Brinza	Cahul District	4	0	2 618
175	Village	Moscovei	Cahul District	4	0	3 035
176	Village	Ecaterinovca	Cimișlia District	4	0	1 130
177	Village	Trifănești	Florești District	4	0	988
178	Village	Limbenii Vechi	Glodeni District	4	0	1 861
179	City/town	Iargara	Leova District	4	0	4 384
180	Village	Sarateni	Leova District	4	1	775
181	Village	Sirma	Leova District	4	0	1 082
182	Village	Cainarii Vechi	Soroca District	4	0	3 041
183	Village	Inundeni	Soroca District	4	1	320
184	Village	Sireti	Strășeni District	4	0	5 778
185	City/town	Ștefan Vodă	Ștefan Vodă District	4	0	7 768
186	Village	Olănești	Ștefan Vodă District	4	0	5 297
187	Village	Balabanu	Taraclia District	4	0	959
188	Village	Abaclia	Basarabeasca District	3	0	5 519
189	Village	Zgurita	Drochia District	3	0	2 840
190	Village	Ghindești	Florești District	3	0	1 528
191	Village	Napadova	Florești District	3	0	1 218
192	Village	Prodănești	Florești District	3	0	1 099
193	Village	Vascauti	Florești District	3	0	1 067
194	Village	Lapusna	Hîncești District	3	0	5 640
195	Village	Sofia	Hîncești District	3	0	1 464
196	Village	Nimoreni	Ialoveni District	3	0	2 302
197	Village	Filipeni	Leova District	3	0	3 271
198	Village	Vatici	Orhei District	3	0	931
199	City/town	Sîngerei	Sîngerei District	3	0	12 667
200	Village	Tudora	Ștefan Vodă District	3	0	2 127
201	Village	Ferapontievca	Comrat Municipality	3	0	1 008
202	Village	Svetlii	Comrat Municipality	3	0	1 883
203	Village	Floreni	Anenii Noi District	2	0	3 713
204	Village	Mereni	Anenii Noi District	2	0	6 174
205	City/town	Lipcani	Briceni District	2	0	5 465
206	Village	Ursoaia	Cahul District	2	0	1 263
207	Village	Taraclia	Căușeni District	2	0	4 280
208	City/town	Criuleni	Criuleni District	2	0	7 138
209	Village	Raculești	Criuleni District	2	0	1 109
210	City/town	Drochia	Drochia District	2	0	16 606
211	Village	Socii Noi	Fălești District	2	1	345
212	Village	Rautel	Fălești District	2	0	4 090
213	Village	Pereni	Hîncești District	2	0	1 331
214	Village	Tigheci	Leova District	2	0	2 245
215	Village	Zberoaia	Nisporeni District	2	0	1 866
216	City/town	Rezina	Rezina District	2	0	10 196
217	Village	Sîngereii Noi	Sîngerei District	2	0	3 341
218	Village	Parcani	Soroca District	2	0	979
219	Village	Solonet	Soroca District	2	0	622
220	Village	Cojusna	Strășeni District	2	0	7 006
221	Village	Micauti	Strășeni District	2	0	2 627
222	City/town	Șoldănești	Șoldănești District	2	0	6 304
223	Village	Musaitu	Taraclia District	2	0	1 081
224	Village	Cetireni	Ungheni District	2	0	2 081
225	Village	Chioselia Rusa	Comrat Municipality	2	0	735
226	Village	Dobrogea	Chișinău Municipality	1	0	3 279
227	Village	Colonita	Chișinău Municipality	1	0	3 340
228	Village	Tohatin	Chișinău Municipality	1	0	2 098
229	Village	Ciorescu	Chișinău Municipality	1	0	5 525
230	Village	Gratiești	Chișinău Municipality	1	0	4 689
231	Village	Bucuria	Cahul District	1	0	791
232	Village	Burlaceni	Cahul District	1	0	2 248
233	Village	Rumeantev	Cahul District	1	0	457
234	Village	Nicolaevca	Cahul District	1	0	748
235	Village	Giurgiulești	Cahul District	1	0	2 995
236	Village	Iujnoe	Cahul District	1	0	764
237	Village	Hutulu	Cahul District	1	0	429
238	Village	Ciobalaccia	Cantemir District	1	0	1 008
239	Village	Pleseni	Cantemir District	1	0	1 199
240	Village	Frumoasa	Călărași District	1	0	660
241	Village	Horodiste	Călărași District	1	0	2 794
242	Village	Baurci	Căușeni District	1	0	556
243	Village	Copanca	Căușeni District	1	0	5 013
244	Village	Grigorievca	Căușeni District	1	0	1 254
245	Village	Tanatari	Căușeni District	1	0	2 868
246	Village	Topala	Cimișlia District	1	0	896
247	City/town	Dondușeni	Dondușeni District	1	0	9 801
248	Village	Badragii Noi	Edineț District	1	0	1 234
249	Village	Brinzeni	Edineț District	1	0	1 538
250	Village	Calinești	Fălești District	1	0	2 821
251	Village	Cuhnești	Glodeni District	1	0	1 829
252	Village	Sturzovca	Glodeni District	1	0	4 856
253	Village	Balceana	Hîncești District	1	0	1 832
254	Village	Boghiceni	Hîncești District	1	0	2 860
255	Village	Sarateni	Hîncești District	1	0	619
256	Village	Molești	Ialoveni District	1	0	2 783
257	Village	Vasieni	Ialoveni District	1	0	4 106
258	Village	Tochile-Raducani	Leova District	1	0	1 474
259	Village	Bălăurești	Nisporeni District	1	0	2 517
260	Village	Ciorești	Nisporeni District	1	0	3 363
261	Village	Soltănești	Nisporeni District	1	0	1 507
262	City/town	Frunză	Ocnița District	1	0	1 476
263	Village	Jeloboc	Orhei District	1	0	1 134
264	Village	Podgoreni	Orhei District	1	0	982
265	Village	Susleni	Orhei District	1	0	4 661
266	Village	Ciorna	Rezina District	1	0	1 202
267	Village	Gordinești	Rezina District	1	0	1 089
268	Village	Tahnauti	Rezina District	1	0	1 449
269	City/town	Costești	Rîșcani District	1	0	2 247
270	Village	Alunis	Rîșcani District	1	0	1 931
271	Village	Sverdiac	Rîșcani District	1	0	552
272	Village	Mihailenii Noi	Rîșcani District	1	0	251
273	Village	Dobrogea Nouă	Sîngerei District	1	0	528
274	Village	Rublenița	Soroca District	1	0	3 781
275	Village	Ruslanovca	Soroca District	1	1	199
276	Village	Recea	Strășeni District	1	0	2 633
277	Village	Vorniceni	Strășeni District	1	0	5 220
278	Village	Curatura	Șoldănești District	1	0	471
279	Village	Brezoaia	Ștefan Vodă District	1	0	1 035
280	Village	Albota de Jos	Taraclia District	1	0	825
281	Village	Hirtop	Taraclia District	1	0	424
282	Village	Aluatu	Taraclia District	1	0	1 143
283	City/town	Telenești	Telenești District	1	0	6 855
284	Village	Chirileni	Ungheni District	1	0	1 996
285	Village	Frăsinești	Ungheni District	1	0	1 375
286	Village	Beșghioz	Comrat Municipality	1	0	3 391
