= Sărata (Prut) =

Location
- Country: Moldova

Physical characteristics
- Mouth
  - location: Prut at Nicolaevca
  - coordinates: 46.3906°N 28.2365°E
- Length: 59 km (37 mi)

Basin features
- Progression: Prut→ Danube→ Black Sea

The Sărata is a 59 km (37 mi) long left tributary of the river Prut in southern Moldova. It flows through the villages Sărata-Galbenă, Sărăteni, Cazangic, Sărata Nouă and Filipeni, and it discharges into the Prut near the village Nicolaevca.
