= Troița =

Troiţa may refer to:

- Troiţa, a village in Vozneseni Commune, Leova district, Moldova
- Troiţa, a village in Găleşti Commune, Mureș County, Romania

== See also ==
- Troiţcoe, a commune in Cimişlia district, Moldova
