= Romani people in Moldova =

Roma in Moldova
Romii din Moldova (Romanian)

Total population
- 9,323 (2014 census)

Regions with significant populations
- Otaci, Soroca, Ursari, Vulcănești.

Languages
- Majority: Vlax Romani and Romanian; Minority: Russian, Ukrainian and Gagauz

Related ethnic groups
- Romani people in Romania, Romani people in Ukraine, Romani people in Russia

Romani people in Moldova are a minority ethnic group of Indo-Aryan origin. The Romani (/ˈroʊməni/ ROH-mə-nee or /ˈrɒməni/ ROM-ə-nee; colloquially known as the Roma (sing.: Rom), traditionally lived a nomadic, itinerant lifestyle. Those resident in Moldova, now sedentary, are divided into ten ethnic subgroups.

According to the 2014 Moldovan census, there were 9,323 Romani people living in Moldova. Data collected by the Bureau of Inter-ethnic Relations in 2012 suggested that this figure could be closer to 20,000, while Romani leaders believe that the actual number of Roma living in Moldova could be up to 250,000. Romani people constitute the ethnic majority in the villages of Ursari and Vulcănești, and make up nearly half of the population in the town of Otaci. Also, the Romani people are an important minority in the city of Soroca (3.07%).

The Moldovan Romani minority are one of the country's most disadvantaged groups. Attainment in many aspects of their lives, including employment, health and education is significantly below that of other Moldovans.

== See also ==
- List of localities in Moldova inhabited by Romani people
