= Filipeni =

Filipeni may refer to:

- Filipeni, a commune in Leova district, Moldova
- Filipeni, a commune in Bacău County, Romania
