= Gheorghe Arpentin =

Moldovan politician (born 1961)

Member of the Moldovan Parliament
- In office 16 March 2010 – 28 November 2010
- Preceded by: Valeriu Lazăr
- Parliamentary group: Democratic Party

Personal details
- Born: Tigheci, Moldavian SSR, Soviet Union
- Party: Democratic Party of Moldova; Alliance for European Integration (2009–2011)
- Profession: Wine Maker

Gheorghe Arpentin (born 9 June 1961) is a Moldovan politician. He has been a member of the Parliament of Moldova since 2010.

Arpentin is co-owner of Les Terres Noires with Nicolas Dirand; he is one of the most well-known wine-makers and wine-growers in Moldova. He holds a Ph.D. in technical sciences and owns his own vineyards. Arpentin has taken wine-making classes in France, where he lived for some time. He founded a wine consulting business in 1997. Ten years later, he was elected to head the Oenologists' Union of Moldova. He is also a member of the main wine-makers' and wine-growers' association in the United States.
