= Gordinești =

Gordineşti may refer to several places in Moldova:

- Gordineşti, a commune in Edineţ district
- Gordineşti, a commune in Rezina district
