= Stella's House and Simon's House =

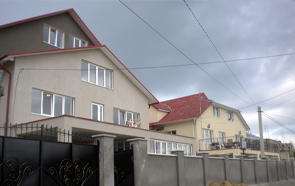
Stella's House 2 and 3 in foreground.

Stella's House is a home(s) designed to rescue orphan girls from human trafficking in Moldova. The first Stella's House (Stella's House 1) was built in Chișinău, Moldova in 2006 by Stella's Voice. Stella's House is designed to provide a safe place for orphan girls to receive all basic needs such as security, food, shelter, and an education.

There are a total of 4 Stella's Houses that have been purchased and are either housing young girls or under construction. Stella's House 1 was recently converted to the introduction of Simon's House. Stella's House 2 opened in April 2009 and Stella's House 3 was completed in 2010. Each Stella's House can shelter approximately 25 girls. Stella's House 4 and Stella's House 5 were purchased in 2010 and are currently under construction. Stella's House 2, 3, 4 & 5 all share property borders. In 2010, Stella's House 1 was converted and renamed to Simon's House (to rescue orphan boys from human trafficking).

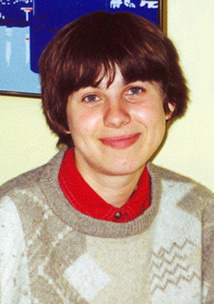
An image of Stella, from which Stella's House is named after.

Before opening Stella's House, for many years Stella's Voice raised funds to aid and rebuild government-run orphanages in Moldova. They specifically began raising funds to help a very poorly maintained Disabled orphanage in Hîncești, Moldova, where they met a young girl named Stella. Stella suffered from epilepsy and was paralyzed on the right-hand side of her body. After visiting the orphanage several times, they became friends with Stella. Later, workers of the non-profit organisation returned to the orphanage to discover she was no longer there. When she turned 16 she was too old to stay and had to move from the orphanage. After searching, they learned that Stella died of AIDS in her mother's hands. This motivated them to build homes called Stella's Houses for young orphan girls to be protected from sex trafficking predators.

With the headquarters in Montgomery, Alabama, Stella's Voice is the organization that runs and operates the Stella's Houses. Some of the orphans who were rescued from Moldova currently travel from Montgomery to speak at various engagements and churches nationwide, such as the Passion Conferences. They represent the growing number of the 36.8 million slaves worldwide who have no voice or ability to stand for their own freedom.

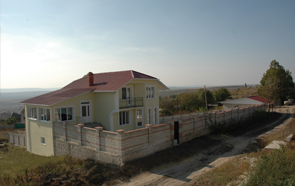
Simon's House.

Simon's House is a home designed to rescue orphan boys from human trafficking in Moldova. Simon's House was originally built in 2006 by Stella's Voice (a nonprofit based out of Montgomery, Alabama) to rescue young orphan girls from human trafficking. It was originally named Stella's House 1 and is located in Chişinău, Moldova. In 2010, Stella's House 1 was converted and renamed to Simon's House. Simon's House is designed to provide a safe place for orphan boys to receive all basic needs such as security, food, shelter, and an education.

Simon's House was named after the founder of the ministry, Simon Cameron (Christian Scottish missionary-evangelist) in honor of his devotion and original vision to help orphan boys and girls in Romania and Moldova. Simon's efforts lead to the personal discovery of the sex trafficking situation in Moldova. The ministry wanted Simon's legacy to continue in the naming of the first boy's home that helps rescue at-risk boys. Simon Cameron died in 2002.
