= Elena Postică =

Moldovan historian

Member of the Commission for the Study of the Communist Dictatorship in Moldova
- In office 14 January 2010 – 2 July 2010

Personal details
- Born: 2 September 1954 (age 72) Lăpușna, Hîncești
- Education: Moldova State University

Elena Postică (born 2 September 1954) is a historian from the Republic of Moldova. She is deputy director of the National Museum of History of Moldova.

== Biography ==
Elena Postică was born on 2 September 1954 in Lăpușna, a commune in Hîncești District, Moldova. She was a member of the Commission for the Study of the Communist Dictatorship in Moldova. She is deputy director of the National Museum of History of Moldova.

== Works ==
- Elena Postică (coordinator and coauthor), Cartea Memoriei. Catalog al victimelor totalitarismului comunist, vol. I, Chișinău, 1999, 465 p.; vol. II, 2001, 463 p.; vol. III, 2003, 465 p.; vol. IV, 2005, 438 p.
- Elena Postică, Rezistenţa antisovietică în Basarabia. 1944-1950, Stiinţa, Chişinău 1997
- Elena Postică (editor), Impactul Trecutului Totalitar Asupra Noilor Democraţii Din Europa Centrală şi de Est: Simpozion Internaţional Sala Albastră a Muzeului Naţional de Istorie a Moldovei, Chişinău, 1-2 Iulie 1999 (The Impact of the Totalitarian past upon the New Democracies ), Chiţinău, Ed. ARC, 1999
- Elena Postică, Războiul informaţional împotriva Republicii Moldova. Cazul diferendului transnistrian, în Tyragetia, 2002, p. 237-250.
- Elena Postică, Deputaţi ai Sfatului Ţării represaţi în 1940, în Cugetul, 1, 1998, p. 92-98.
- Elena Postică, Grupuri de rezistenţă pe teritoriul Basarabiei. Uniunea Democratică a Libertăţii, în Arhivele Totalitarismului, 15-16, 1997, 2-3, p. 66-77.
- Elena Postică, Rezistenţa antisovietică în Basarabia (1944–1950), în Destin Românesc, 1997, 2, p. 99-109.
- Elena Postică, Rezistenţa anticomunistă în Basarabia. Partidul Libertăţii, în Destin Românesc, 1996, 3, p. 89-99.
- Elena Postică, Organizaţii de rezistenţă în Basarabia postbelică (1944–1950), în Revista de Istorie a Moldoevei, 1996, 4, p. 43-55.
- Ion Ţurcanu, Elena Postică, Veronica Boldişăor, Lupta antisovietică şi anticomunistă a grupului lui Filimon Bodiu, în Literatura şi Arta, 1995, 6 iulie
- Elena Postică, "Armata Neagră". Organizaţie patriotică de rezistenţă sau "bandă teroristă antisovietică", Ţara, 1995, 10 ianuarie [= în Destin Românesc, 1996, 4, p. 73-84]
- Elena Postică, "Partidul Libertăţii": reafirmarea ideii naţionale, în Ţara, 1995, 1-5 decembrie
- Elena Postică, "Sabia dreptăţii", în Ţara, 1995, 19, 26 ianuarie
- Elena Postică, "Uniunea Democratică a Libertăţii" în Ţara, 1995, 22 martie
- Elena Postică, Contribuţii la cercetarea activităţii adminis¬traţiei româneşti din Basarabia în primele luni de la Marea Unire, în Anuarul Muzeului Naţional de Istorie a Moldovei, Chişinău, 1992, p. 208-213.
