= Sărățica =

Sărățica may refer to one of two places in Leova District, Moldova:

- Sărățica Nouă, a commune
- Sărățica Veche, a village in Tomaiul Nou commune
