= Covurlui, Leova =

Covurlui
- Comună
- Location within Moldova
- Coordinates: 46°35′38″N 28°24′5″E
- Country: Moldova
- District: Leova District

Government
  - Mayor: Ion Neghină (PDM)
- Elevation: 197 m (646 ft)

Population (2014 census)
  - Total: 1,604
- Time zone: UTC+2 (EET)
  - Summer (DST): UTC+3 (EEST)
- Postal code: MD-6317

Covurlui is a village in Leova District, Moldova.
