= Tomai =

Tomai may refer to several places:

- Tomai, a commune in Gagauzia
- Tomai, a commune in Leova District
- Tomai Station, a railway station in Ninohe, Iwate Prefecture, Japan
