= Vitalie Călugăreanu =

Moldovan journalist

- Born: 6 October 1977 (age 48); Cărpineni, Moldavian SSR, Soviet Union
- Known for: journalist Jurnal TV and Deutsche Welle

Vitalie Călugăreanu (born 6 October 1977) is a Moldovan journalist. He is a Chişinău-based journalist and talk-show host of Shadow Government, a program on Jurnal TV. Also, Călugăreanu is a correspondent for Deutsche Welle.

== Biography ==
Vitalie Călugăreanu was born on 6 October 1977 in Cărpineni, Hânceşti District. Călugăreanu has a degree in journalism and communication sciences from the Moldova State University (1999).

Călugăreanu has worked for several newspapers and radio stations in Chişinău (Flux, radio Unda Libera, radio Noroc). Also, he has worked as a reporter for television station Antena 1 (Romania), Prima (news agency), Euro TV Moldova. He is a correspondent for Jurnalul Naţional and Deutsche Welle. Călugăreanu has been working for Jurnal TV since 2009.

Between 2000 and 2001 he was editor-in-chief of a Chişinău edition of Jurnalul Naţional, which ceased its activities because of financial reasons.
