= Curchi Monastery =

Moldovian monastery

Coordinates: 47.3339°N 28.6535°E

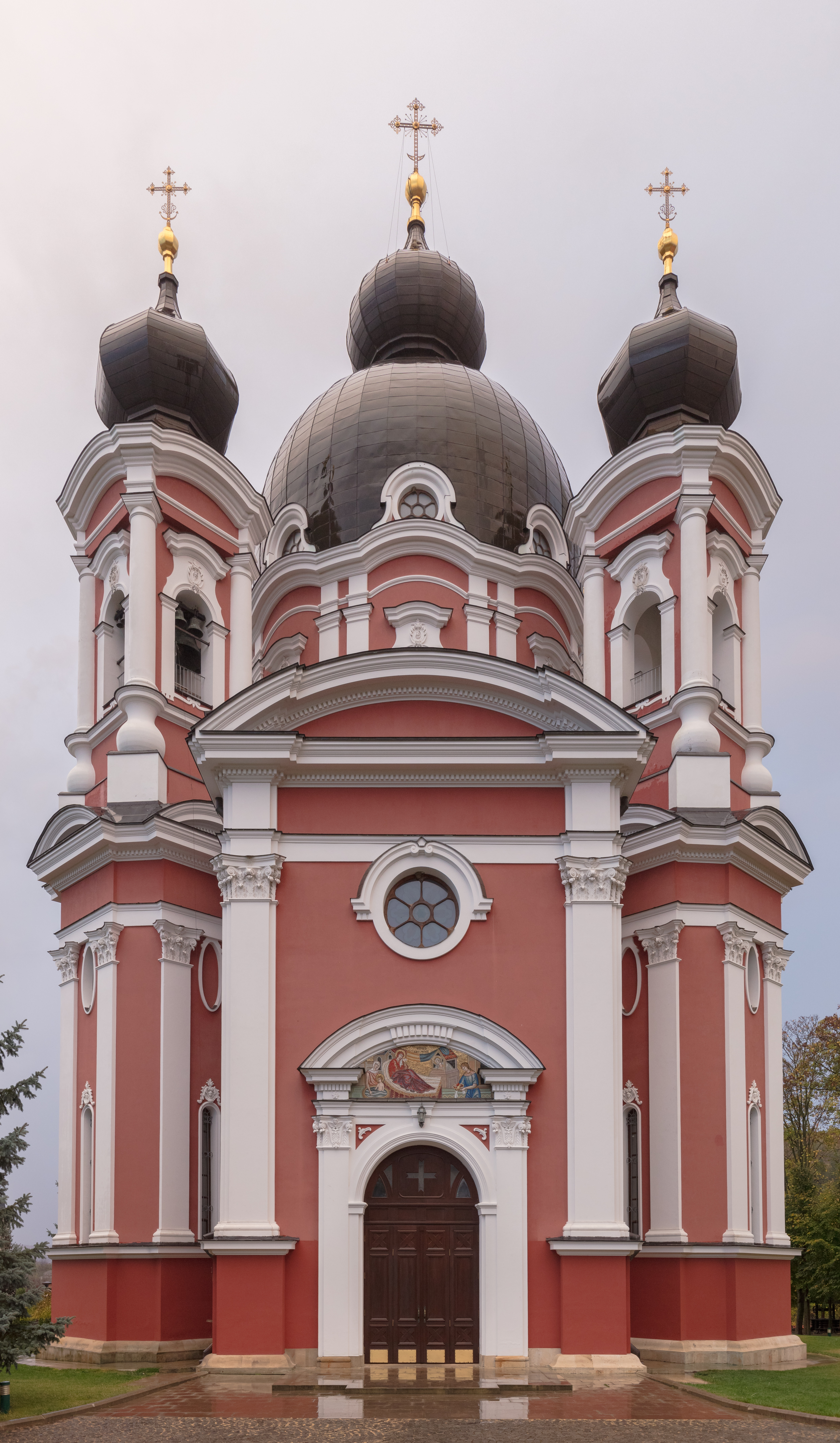
Nativity of the Virgin Mary Church

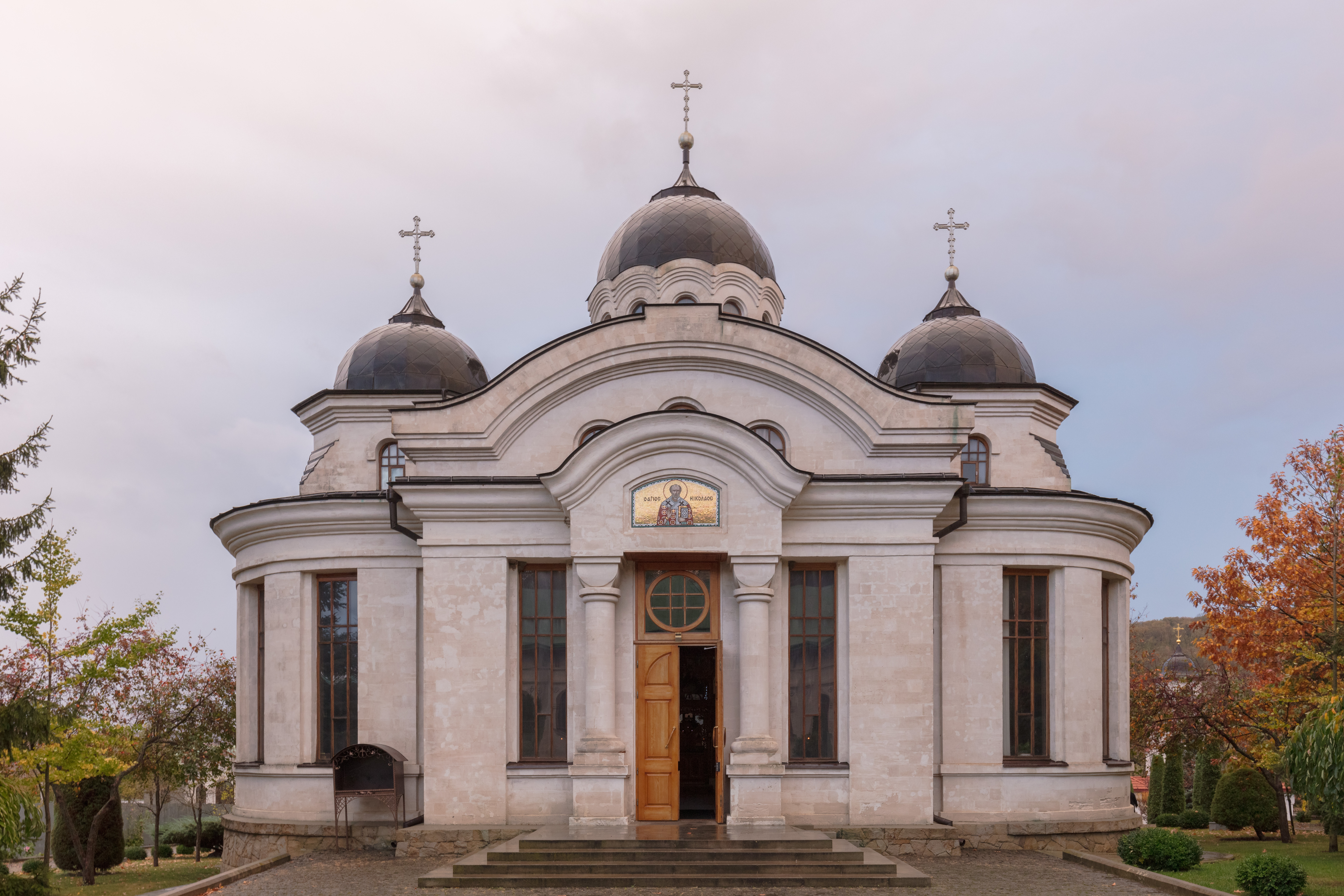
St. Nicholas Church

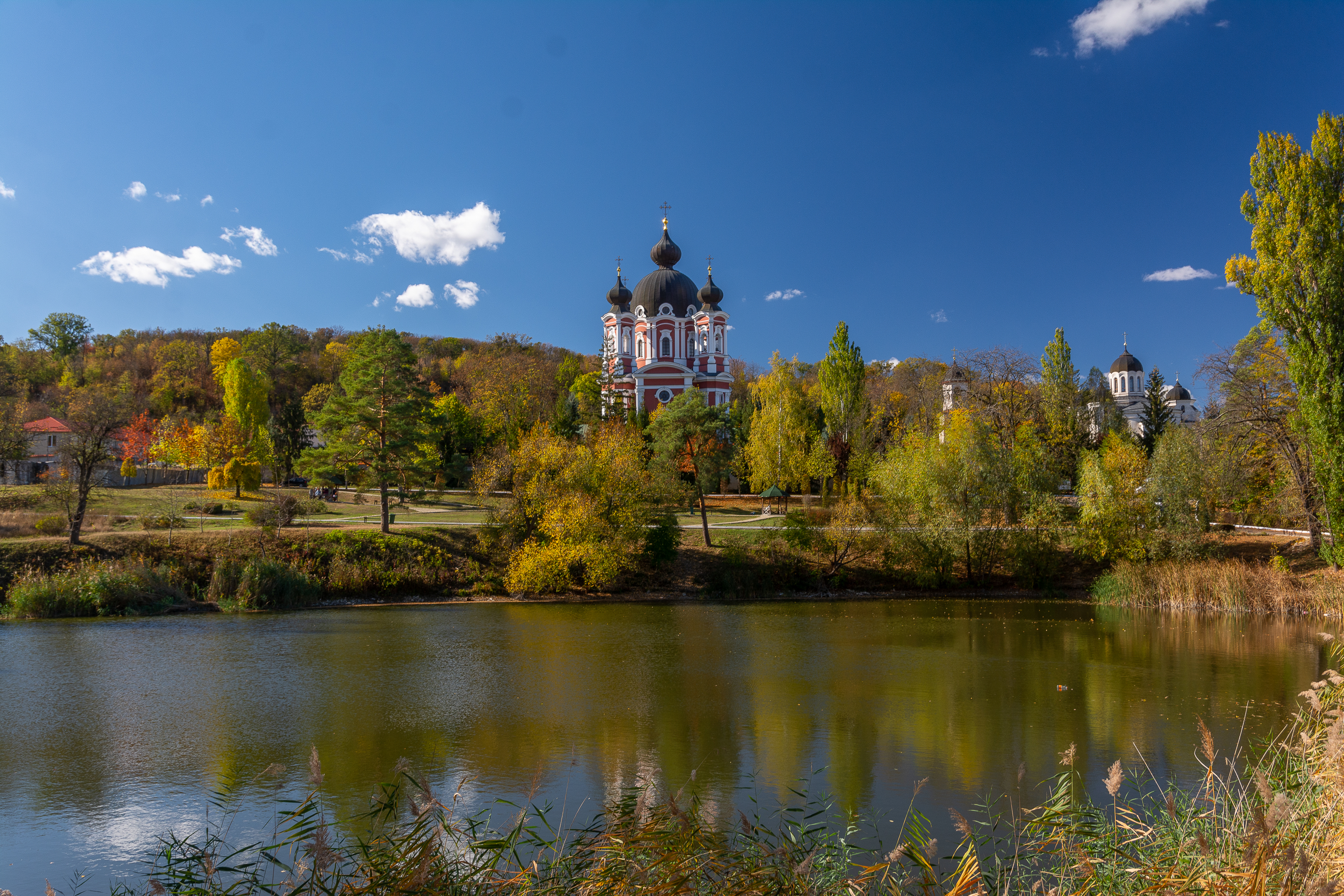
A view of the complex showing multiple buildings

The Curchi Monastery (Romanian: Mănăstirea Curchi) is an Eastern Orthodox monastery in Vatici, Orhei District, Moldova. There are several churches on the site, including the baroque cathedral Nașterea Domnului, which was designed by Bartolomeo Rastrelli and has the highest dome in Moldova. The monastery was used as a psychiatric hospital between 1959 and 1999, but it reopened as a monastery in 2005.

== Construction ==
The monastery is located in Orhei forest near Curchi, approximately 14 km southwest of the town of Orhei. The monastery was founded between 1773 and 1775, although some date the founding to the conversion of the later stone church to a monastery in 1868.

The monastery complex includes five church in total. The Baroque cathedral Nașterea Domnului was designed by Bartolomeo Rastrelli, inspired by the Church of St Andrew in Kyiv, and built in 1872. Its 57 metre dome is the highest dome in Moldova. A fire in the church during the Second World War destroyed two of the original belfries, and the icons and iconostasis.

A stone church, also called the summer church, Naşterea Domnului, was built at the site in 1810, dedicated to the Nativity of the Virgin Mary. The winter church St. Demetrius was built in 1844, and a winter church of St. Nicholas, was built in 1936-–1939 but was not finished.

The monastery was used as a psychiatric hospital between 1959 and 1999, but it reopened as a monastery in 2005, by which time it was in need of repair. A fund-raising campaign to raise money to repair the church was spearheaded by the President of Moldova.
