= Secăreni =

- Commune
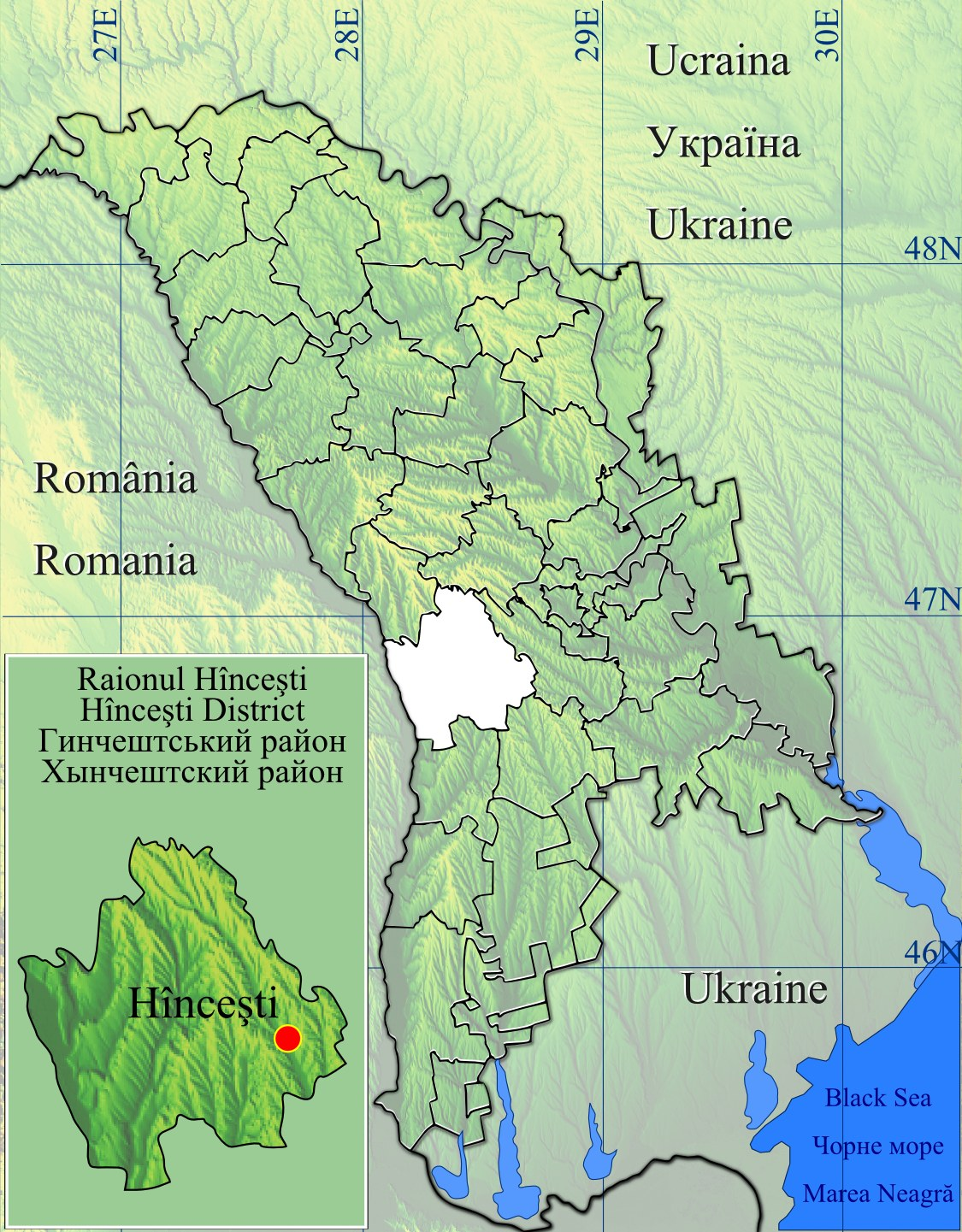
- Location within Hîncești
- Coordinates: 47°1′48″N 28°19′57″E
- Country: Moldova
- District: Hîncești District

Government
  - Mayor: Gheorghe Cojocaru, PLDM

Area
  - Total: 5.26 km^{2} (2.03 sq mi)

Population (2014)
  - Total: 1,656
- Time zone: UTC+2 (EET)
  - Summer (DST): UTC+3 (EEST)
- Postal code: MD-3448

Secăreni is a commune in Hînceşti District, Moldova. It is composed of three villages: Cornești, Secăreni and Secărenii Noi.
