= Cărpineni =

- Commune
- Location in Moldova
- Coordinates: 46°46′N 28°21′E
- Country: Moldova
- District: Hîncești District
- Elevation: 259 ft (79 m)

Population (2014)
  - Total: 8,358
- Time zone: UTC+2 (EET)
  - Summer (DST): UTC+3 (EEST)
- Postal code: MD-3420
- Area code: +373 269

Cărpineni is a commune in Hîncești District, Moldova. It is composed of two villages, Cărpineni and Horjești.

== Notable people ==
- Vitalie Călugăreanu
- Ștefan Holban
- Ivan Ionaș
