= Lăpușna, Hîncești =

Lăpușna
- Commune
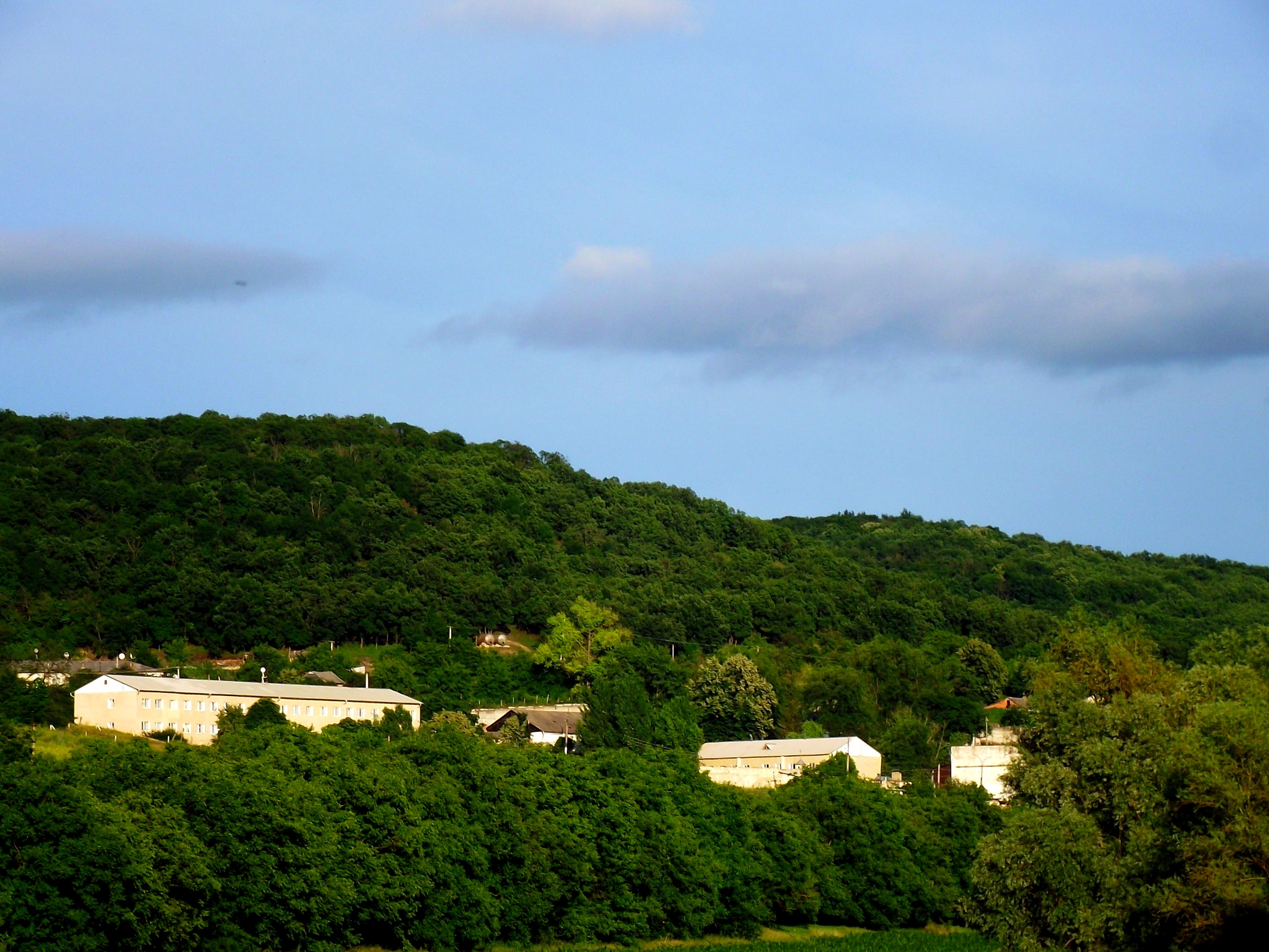
- View of Rusca

- Location in Moldova
- Coordinates: 46°53′N 28°25′E
- Country: Moldova
- District: Hîncești District
- Elevation: 371 ft (113 m)

Population (2014)
  - Total: 5,022
- Time zone: UTC+2 (EET)
  - Summer (DST): UTC+3 (EEST)
- Postal code: MD-3431
- Area code: +373 269

Lăpușna is a commune in Hîncești District, Moldova. It is composed of three villages: Anini, Lăpușna, and Rusca.

== Notable natives ==
- Vlad Filat (born 1969), Moldovan businessman and politician
- Aurel Dragoș Munteanu (1942–2005), Romanian author, director of TVR, and diplomat
- Elena Postică (born 1954), Moldovan historian

== See also ==
- Alexander IV Lăpușneanu, voivode of Moldavia
