= Hănăsenii Noi =

- Commune
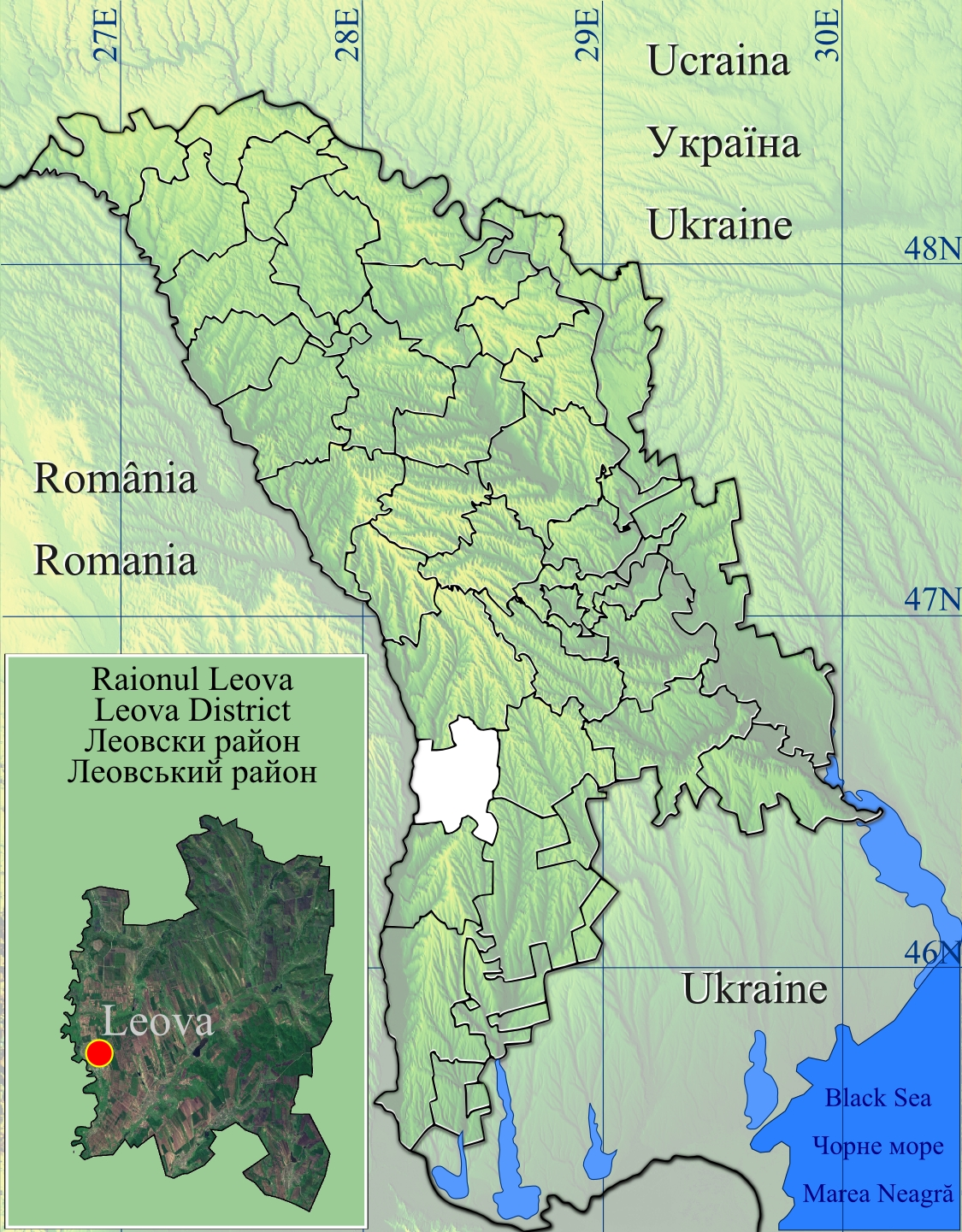
- Location within Moldova Leova
- Coordinates: 46°25′1″N 28°15′17″E
- Country: Moldova
- District: Leova District
- Elevation: 64 m (210 ft)

Population (2014)
  - Total: 983
- Time zone: UTC+2 (EET)
  - Summer (DST): UTC+3 (EEST)
- Postal code: MD-6320

Hănăsenii Noi is a commune in Leova District, Moldova. It is composed of two villages, Hănăsenii Noi and Nicolaevca.
