= Tochile-Răducani =

- Village
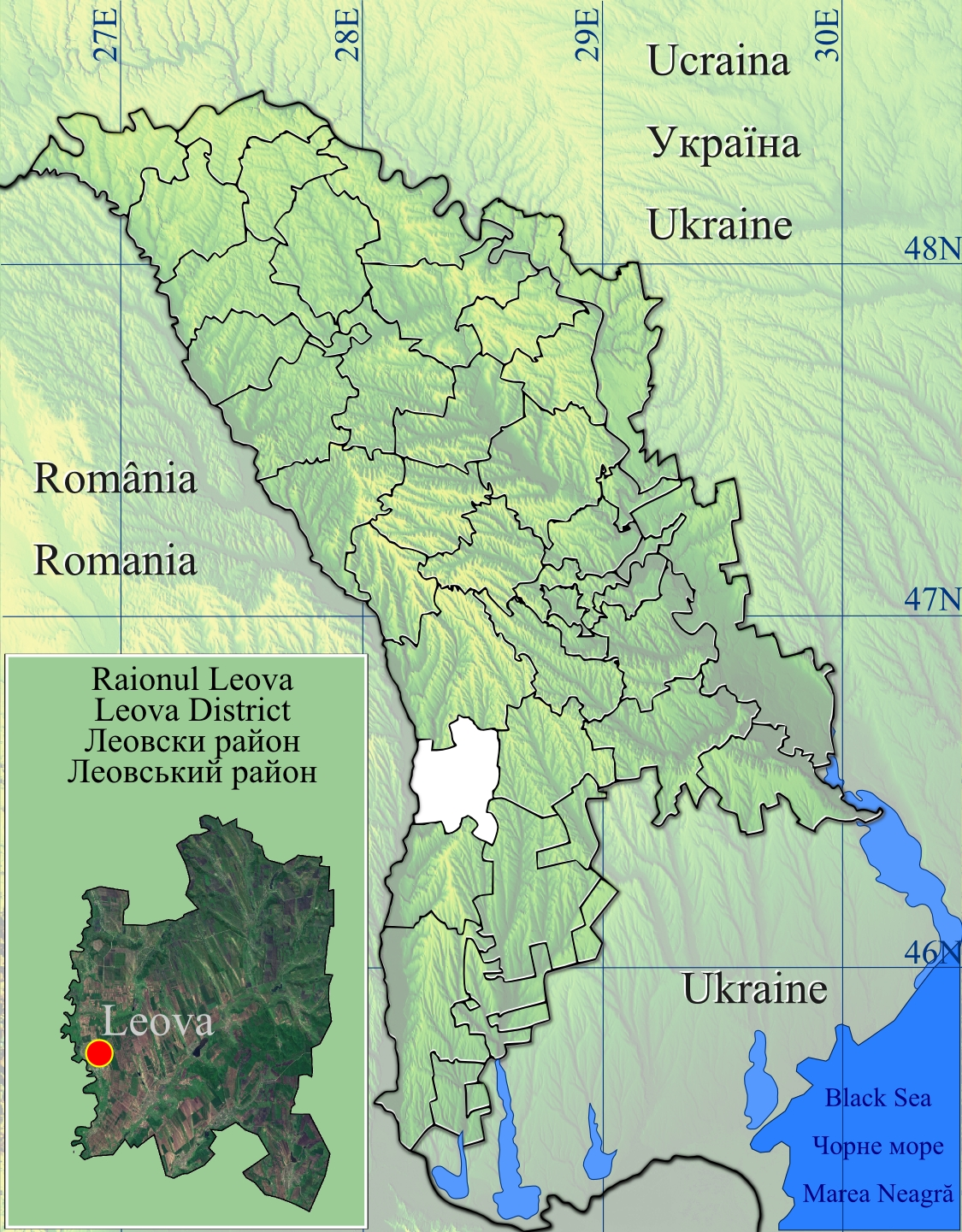
- Location within Moldova Leova
- Coordinates: 46°34′39″N 28°14′41″E
- Country: Moldova
- District: Leova District

Government
  - Mayor: Marin Ciobanu (PDM)
- Elevation: 79 m (259 ft)

Population (2014 census)
  - Total: 1,445
- Time zone: UTC+2 (EET)
  - Summer (DST): UTC+3 (EEST)
- Postal code: MD-6330

Tochile-Răducani is a village in Leova District, Moldova.
