= Tomai, Leova =

Tomai
- Location within Moldova
- Country: Moldova
- District: Leova District

Population (2014 census)
  - Total: 3,042
- Postal code: MD-6331

Tomai is a village in Leova District, Moldova.
