= Malinovscoe =

- Commune
- Location within Moldova
- Coordinates: 47.8833333333°N 27.5°E
- Country: Moldova
- District: Rîșcani

Government
  - Mayor: Ivan Doroș

Population (2014)
  - Total: 1,068
- Time zone: UTC+2 (EET)
  - Summer (DST): UTC+3 (EEST)

Malinovscoe is a commune in Rîșcani District, Moldova. It is composed of two villages, Lupăria and Malinovscoe.
