= Moscovei =

- Commune
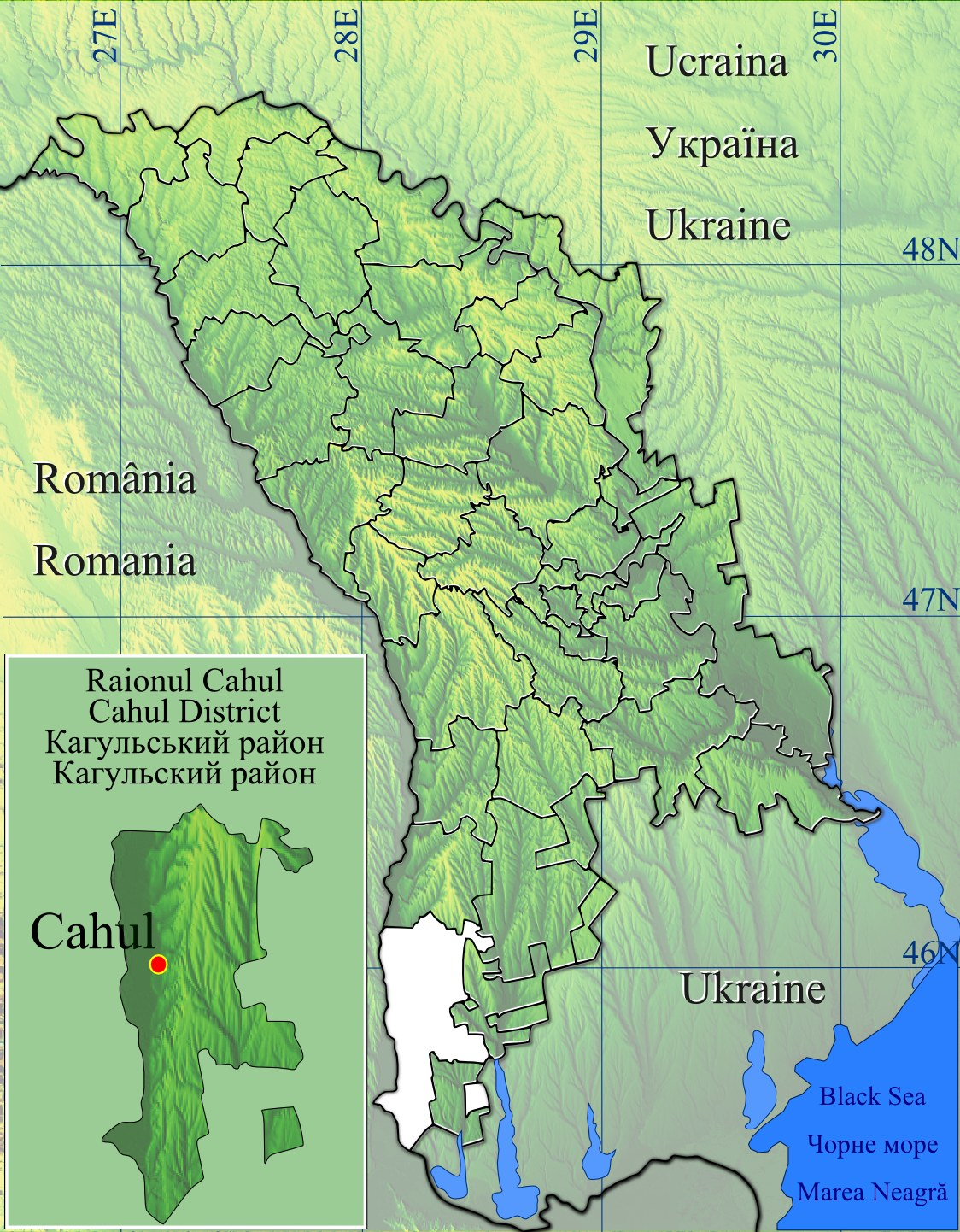
- Location within Cahul
- Coordinates: 45°55′21″N 28°22′25″E
- Country: Moldova
- District: Cahul District

Population (2014)
  - Total: 2,767

Moscovei is a commune in Cahul District, Moldova. It is composed of two villages, Moscovei and Trifeștii Noi.
