= Vatici =

- Commune
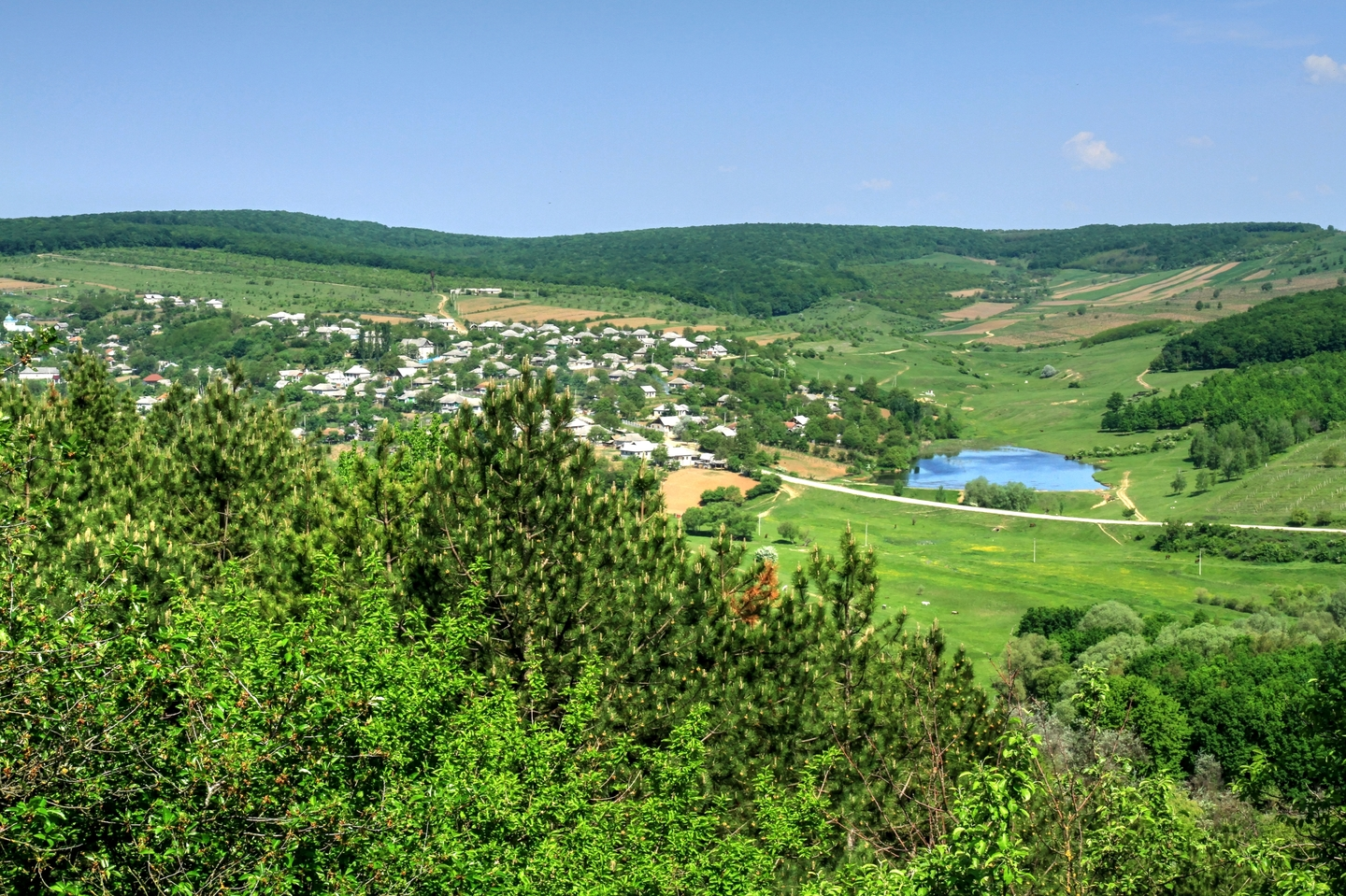
- Skyline of Tabăra

- Location in Moldova
- Coordinates: 47°20′16″N 28°37′05″E
- Country: Moldova
- District: Orhei District

Population (2014)
  - Total: 1,977
- Time zone: UTC+2 (EET)
  - Summer (DST): UTC+3 (EEST)

Vatici is a commune in Orhei District, Moldova. It is composed of three villages: Curchi, Tabăra and Vatici.

The Orthodox Curchi Monastery is located in the commune.
