= Sărata-Galbenă =

- Commune
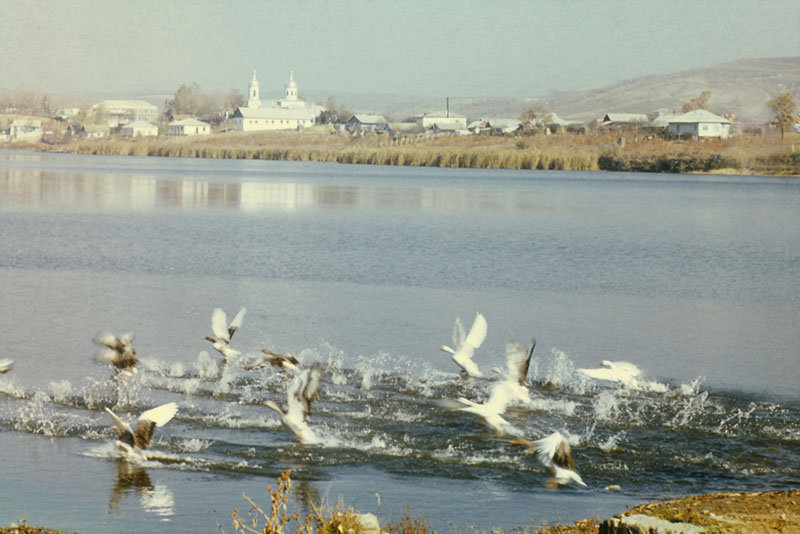

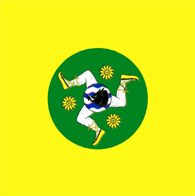
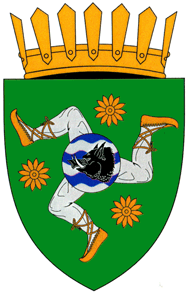
- Flag Coat of arms

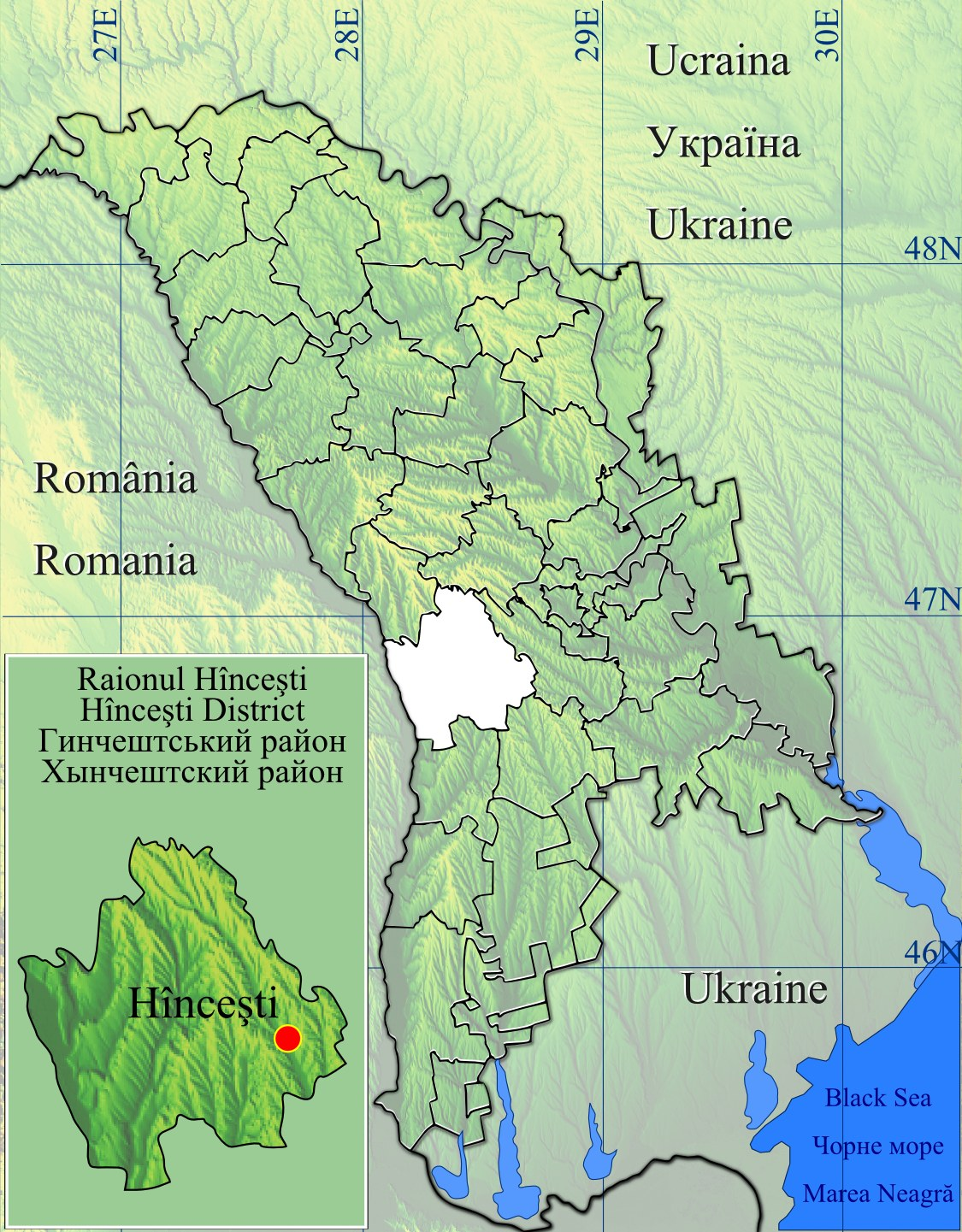
- Location within Hîncești
- Coordinates: 46°44′19″N 28°31′9″E
- Country: Moldova
- District: Hîncești District

Government
  - Mayor: Ștefan Vlas (PL)
- Elevation: 96 m (315 ft)

Population (2014)
  - Total: 4,822
- Time zone: UTC+2 (EET)
  - Summer (DST): UTC+3 (EEST)
- Postal code: 3446

Sărata-Galbenă is a commune in Hîncești District, Moldova. It is composed of five villages: Brătianovca, Cărpineanca, Coroliovca, Sărata-Galbenă and Valea Florii. Its existence was first documented in 1609.

FC Petrocub Hîncești is based in the commune.
