= Ciorești =

- Commune
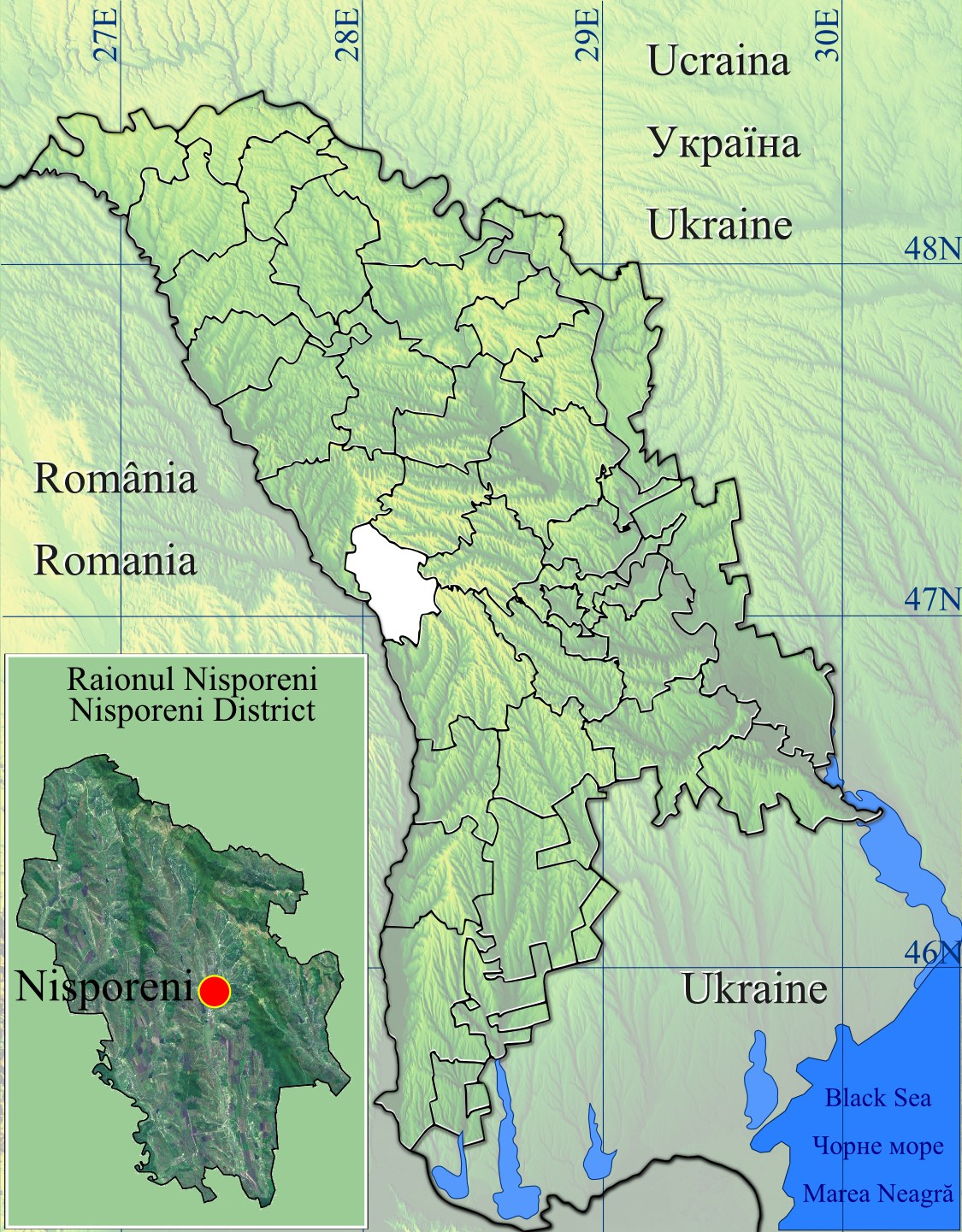
- Location within Nisporeni
- Coordinates: 47°10′0″N 28°13′14″E
- Country: Moldova
- Elevation: 161 m (528 ft)

Population (2014)
  - Total: 3,430
- Time zone: UTC+2 (EET)
  - Summer (DST): UTC+3 (EEST)
- Postal code: MD-6421

Ciorești is a commune in Nisporeni District, Moldova. It is composed of two villages—Ciorești and Vulcănești.

Vulcănești has a Romani-majority population.
