= Ecaterinovca =

- Commune
- Location within Moldova
- Coordinates: 46.5838888889°N 28.7494444444°E
- Country: Moldova
- District: Cimișlia

Government
  - Mayor: Efim Strogoteanu (PCRM)

Population (2014)
  - Total: 1,512
- Time zone: UTC+2 (EET)
  - Summer (DST): UTC+3 (EEST)

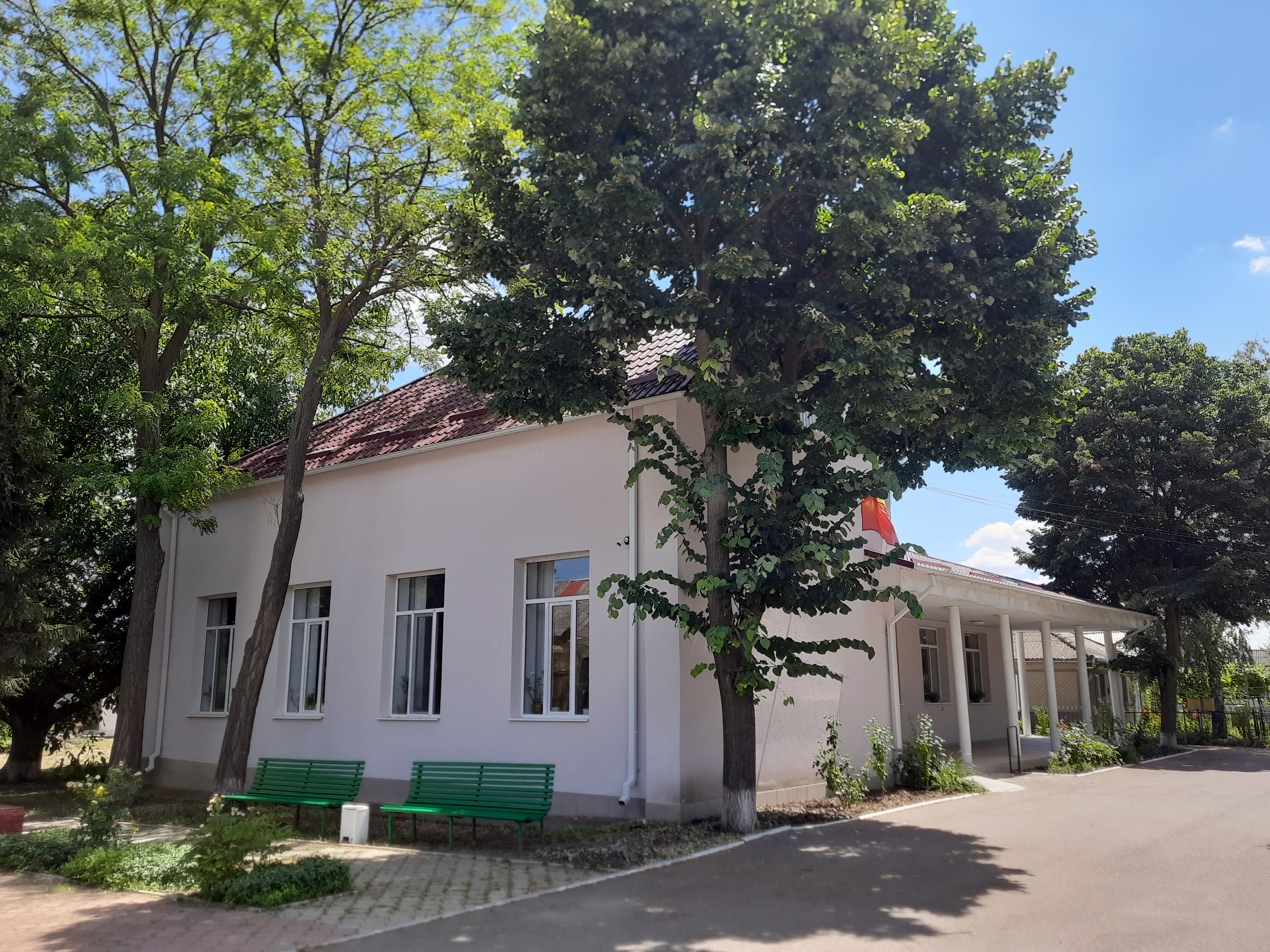
Ecaterinovca Mayoral office

Ecaterinovca (german Jekaterinowka) is a commune in Cimișlia District, Moldova. It is composed of two villages, Coștangalia and Ecaterinovca.

The village was founded in 1908 by German settlers. In 2025, the historical museum ‘Jekaterinowka’ was founded with the name ‘Muzeul de istorie al germanilor Basarabeni’ (History Museum of the Bessarabian Germans). In 1940, 706 Germans and 44 people of other nationalities lived in the village.

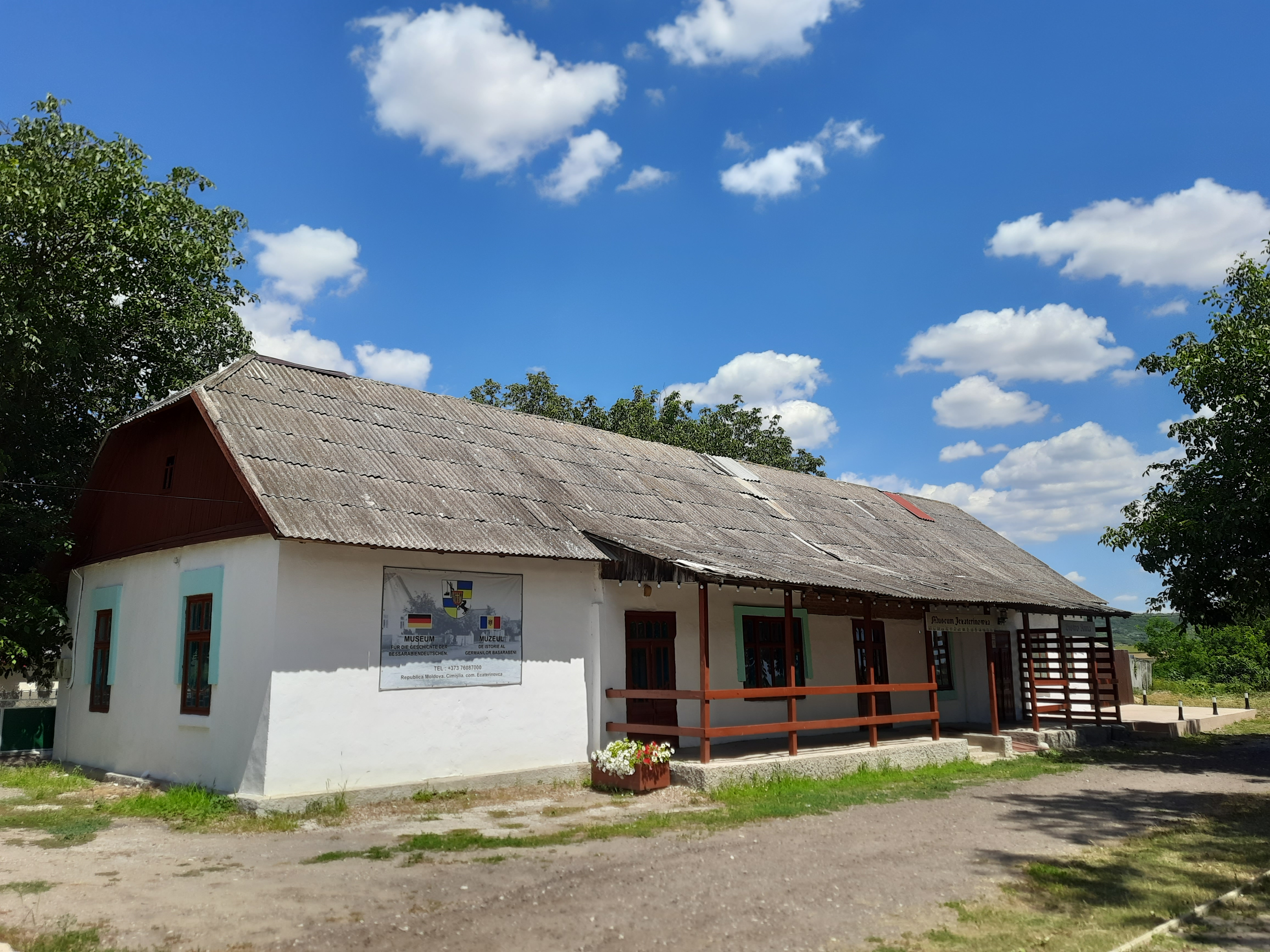
Museum of the history of Bessarabia Germans in Ecaterinovca, Cimișlia District, Republic of Moldova.
