= Recea, Strășeni =

Recea
- Village
- Location in Moldova
- Coordinates: 47°13′31″N 28°34′45″E
- Moldova: Moldova
- District: Strășeni District
- Established: 2011

Government
  - Mrs.: Olga Vlădicescu

Population (2014 census)
  - Total: 2,325
- Time zone: UTC+2 (EET)
  - Summer (DST): UTC+3 (EEST)

Recea is a village in Strășeni District, Moldova. The village has a total area of 24.89 km^{2}, with a total perimeter of 33.37 km.

== Demographic data ==
In 1997, the population of the Recea was estimated to 3150 inhabitants. According to the census of 2004, the population of is 2633 inhabitants, out of which 48.23% are men and 51.77% women. The ethnic structure of the population is as follows: 98.90% - Romanians, 0.27% - Ukrainians, 0.49% - Russians, 0.04% - Gagauzians, 0.11% - Bulgarians, 0.04% - Rroma, 0.15% - other ethnicities.

939 households were registered in the commune.

== Notable people ==
- Gheorghe Buruiană
