= Troițcoe =

- Village
- Location within Moldova
- Coordinates: 46.5144444444°N 29.0283333333°E
- Country: Moldova
- District: Cimișlia District

Government
  - Mayor: Tatiana Dumanova (PSRM)

Population (2014 census)
  - Total: 1,024
- Time zone: UTC+2 (EET)
  - Summer (DST): UTC+3 (EEST)

Troițcoe is a village in Cimișlia District, Moldova.
