= Tomaiul Nou =

- Commune
- Location within Moldova
- Coordinates: 46°37′28″N 28°33′06″E
- Country: Moldova
- Elevation: 130 m (430 ft)

Population (2014)
  - Total: 753
- Time zone: UTC+2 (EET)
  - Summer (DST): UTC+3 (EEST)
- Postal code: MD-6332

Tomaiul Nou is a commune in Leova District, Moldova. It is composed of two villages, Sărățica Veche and Tomaiul Nou.
