= Tuzara =

- Commune
- Location within Moldova
- Coordinates: 47.2416666667°N 28.3041666667°E
- Country: Moldova
- District: Călărași District

Government
  - Mayor: Gheorghe Railean (AMN)

Population (2014)
  - Total: 2,456
- Time zone: UTC+2 (EET)
  - Summer (DST): UTC+3 (EEST)

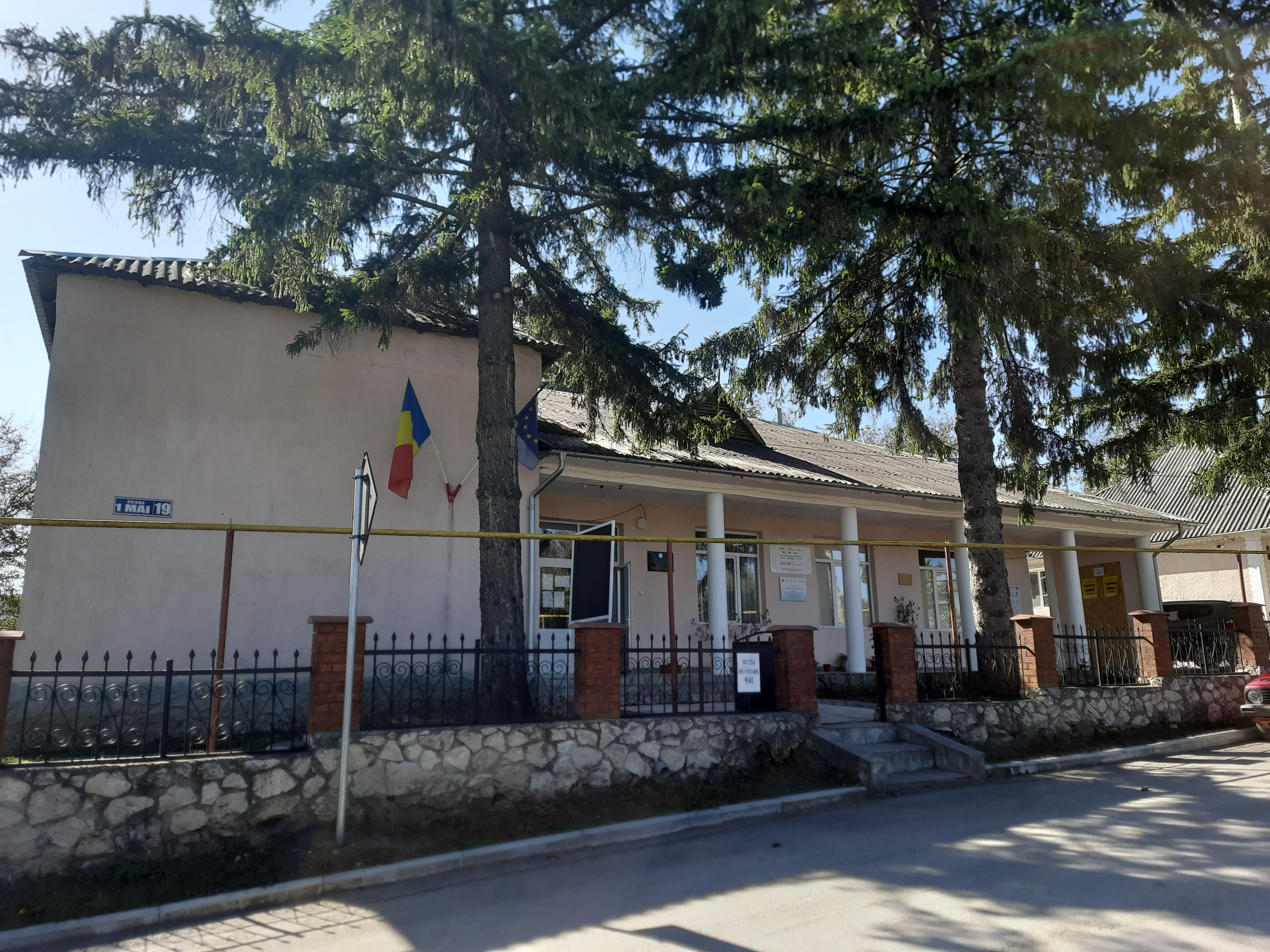
Tuzara town hall, Calarasi district

Tuzara is a commune in Călărași District, Moldova. It is composed of three villages: Novaci, Seliștea Nouă and Tuzara.
