= Sărăteni, Leova =

Sărăteni
- Commune
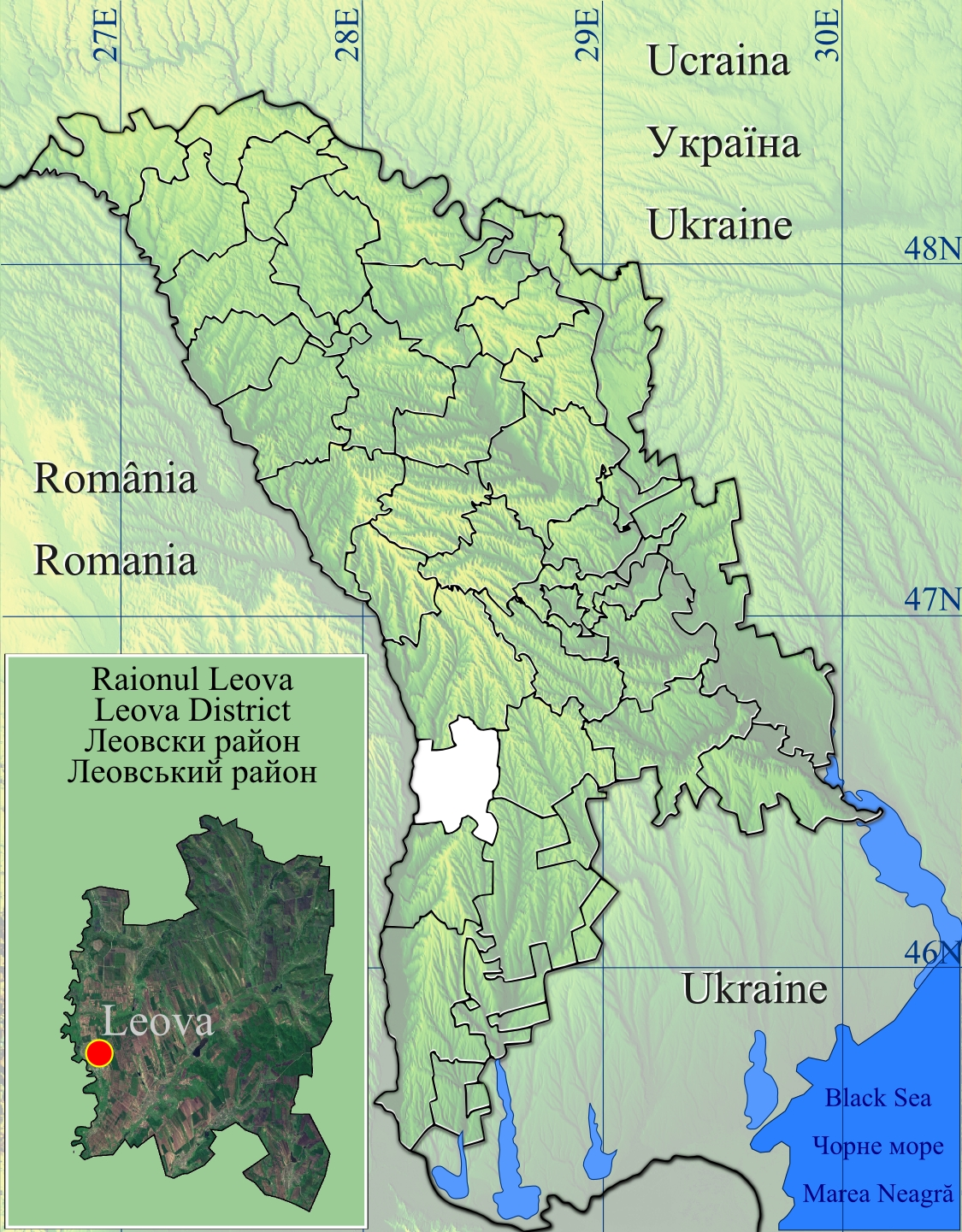
- Location within Moldova Leova
- Coordinates: 46°36′37″N 28°27′59″E
- Country: Moldova
- Elevation: 50 m (160 ft)

Population (2014)
  - Total: 987
- Time zone: UTC+2 (EET)
  - Summer (DST): UTC+3 (EEST)
- Postal code: MD-6326

Sărăteni is a commune in Leova District, Moldova. It is composed of two villages, Sărăteni and Victoria.
