= Buda, Călărași =

Buda
- Commune
- Location within Moldova
- Coordinates: 47°12′28″N 28°13′18″E
- Country: Moldova
- District: Călărași

Government
  - Mayor: Lilian Gotcă (PL)

Population (2014)
  - Total: 987
- Time zone: UTC+2 (EET)
  - Summer (DST): UTC+3 (EEST)

Buda is a commune in Călărași District, Moldova. It is composed of two villages, Buda and Ursari.
