= Tigheci =

- Commune
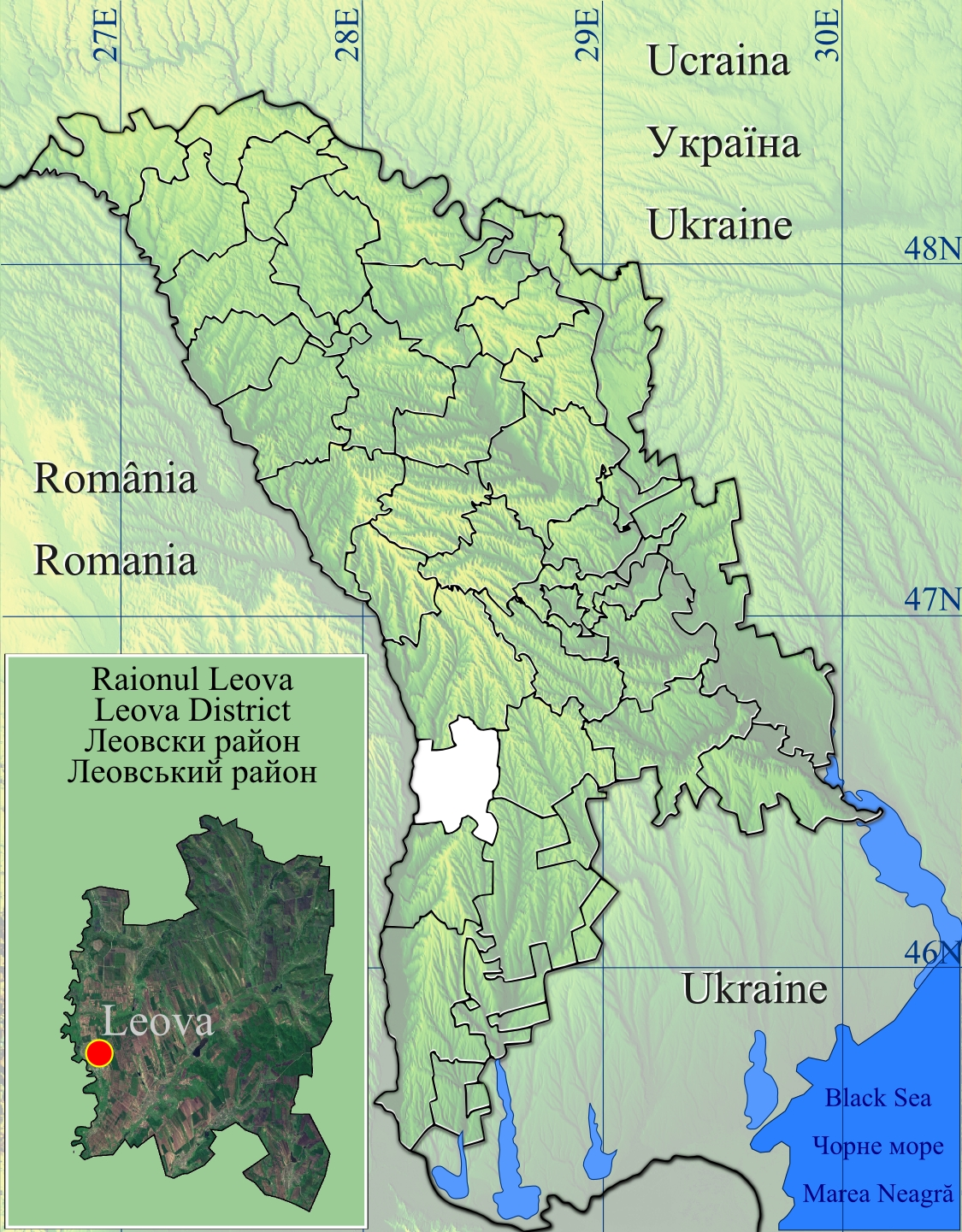
- Location within Moldova Leova
- Coordinates: 46°23′27″N 28°22′35″E
- Country: Moldova
- District: Leova District
- Elevation: 87 m (285 ft)

Population (2014)
  - Total: 2,300
- Time zone: UTC+2 (EET)
  - Summer (DST): UTC+3 (EEST)
- Postal code: MD-6329
- Climate: Cfb
- Website: http://www.tigheci.md

Tigheci is a commune in Leova District, Moldova. It is composed of two villages, Tigheci and Cuporani.
