= Gordinești, Rezina =

Gordinești
- Village
- Location within Moldova
- Coordinates: 47.6961111111°N 28.8011111111°E
- Country: Moldova
- District: Rezina District

Government
  - Mayor: Leonid Rusu (PLDM)

Population (2014 census)
  - Total: 961
- Time zone: UTC+2 (EET)
  - Summer (DST): UTC+3 (EEST)

Gordinești is a village in Rezina District, Moldova.

http://localitati.casata.md/index.php?action=viewlocalitate&id=6720
