= Vozneseni =

- Commune
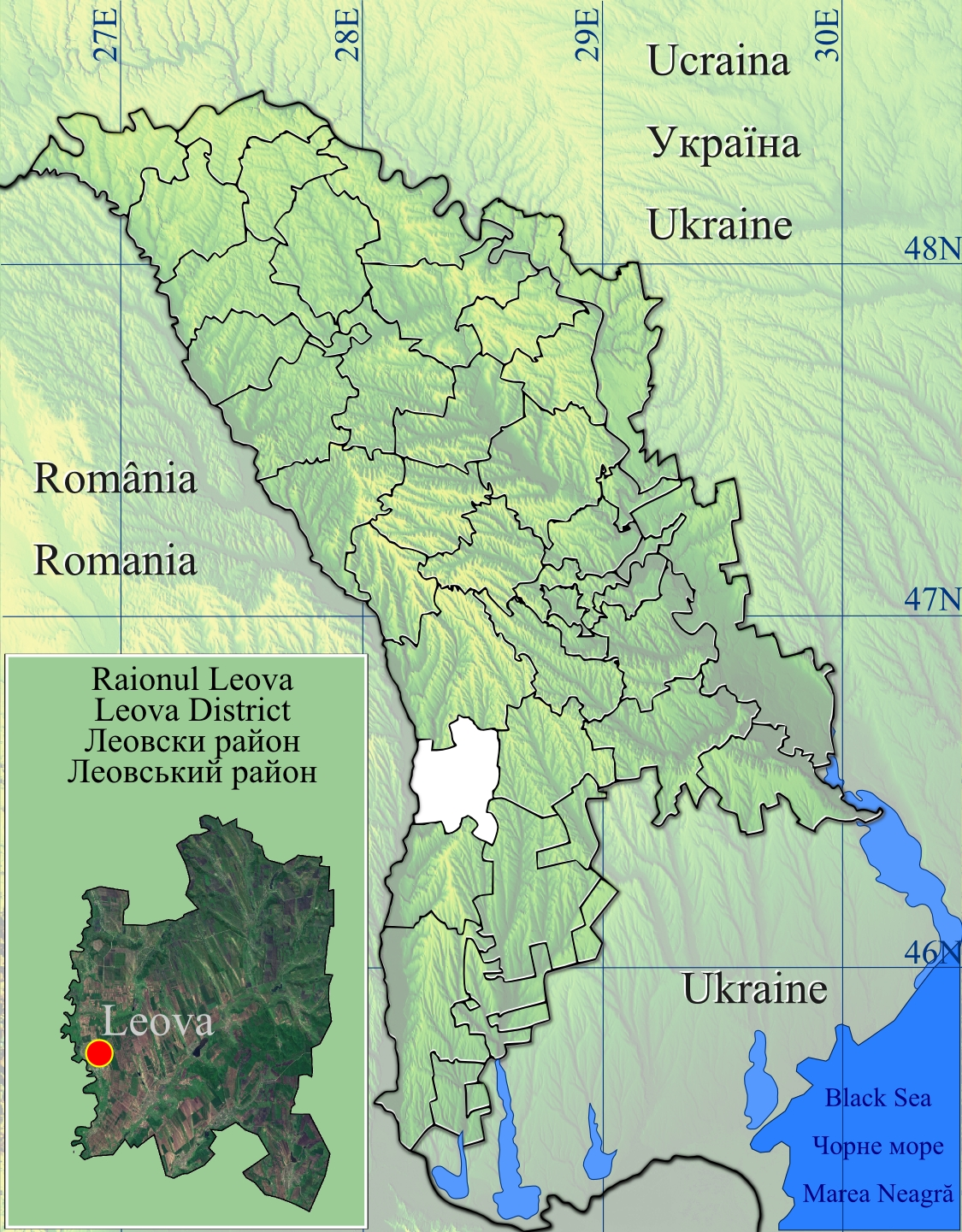
- Location within Moldova Leova
- Coordinates: 46°35′6″N 28°28′10″E
- Country: Moldova
- District: Leova District
- Elevation: 68 m (223 ft)

Population (2014)
  - Total: 1,192
- Time zone: UTC+2 (EET)
  - Summer (DST): UTC+3 (EEST)
- Postal code: MD-6334

Vozneseni is a commune in Leova District, Moldova. It is composed of three villages: Troian, Troița and Vozneseni.
