= Filipeni, Leova =

Filipeni
- Comună
- Location within Moldova
- Coordinates: 46°26′11″N 28°19′33″E
- Country: Moldova
- District: Leova District

Government
  - Mayor: Vasile Grosu (PDM)
- Elevation: 44 m (144 ft)

Population (2014 census)
  - Total: 3,024
- Time zone: UTC+2 (EET)
  - Summer (DST): UTC+3 (EEST)
- Postal code: MD-6319

Filipeni is a village in Leova District, Moldova.
