= Hîncești District =

Coordinates: 46°50′N 28°25′E

Hîncești
- District (Raion)
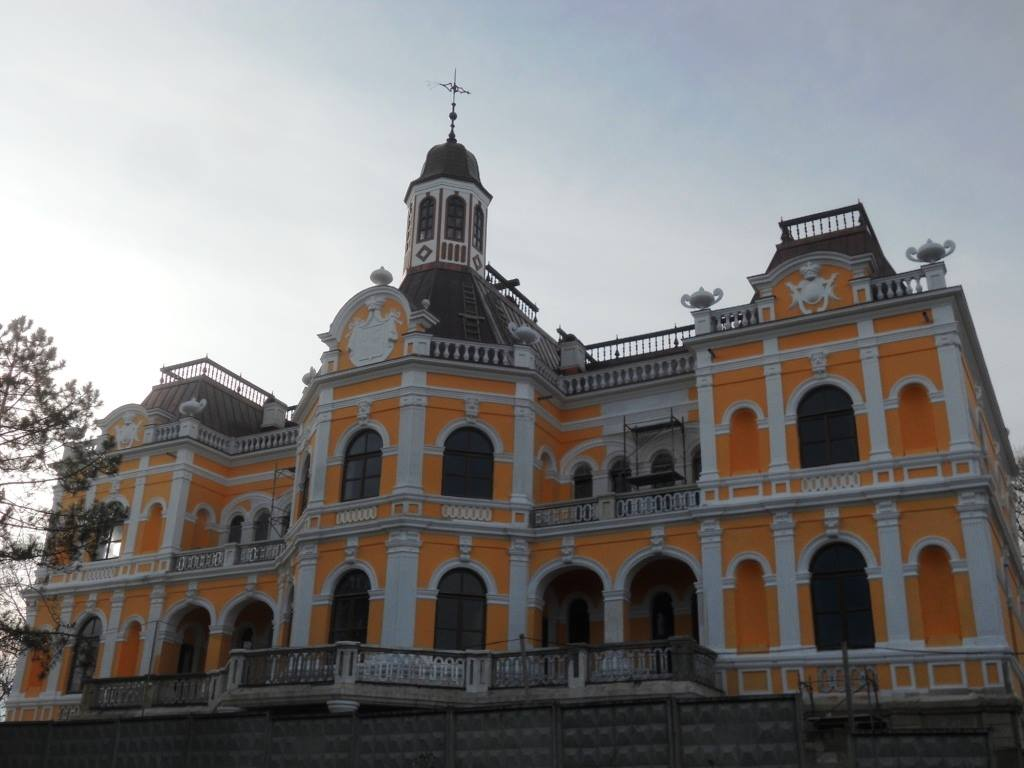
- Mansion of Manuc Bey

- Flag Coat of arms

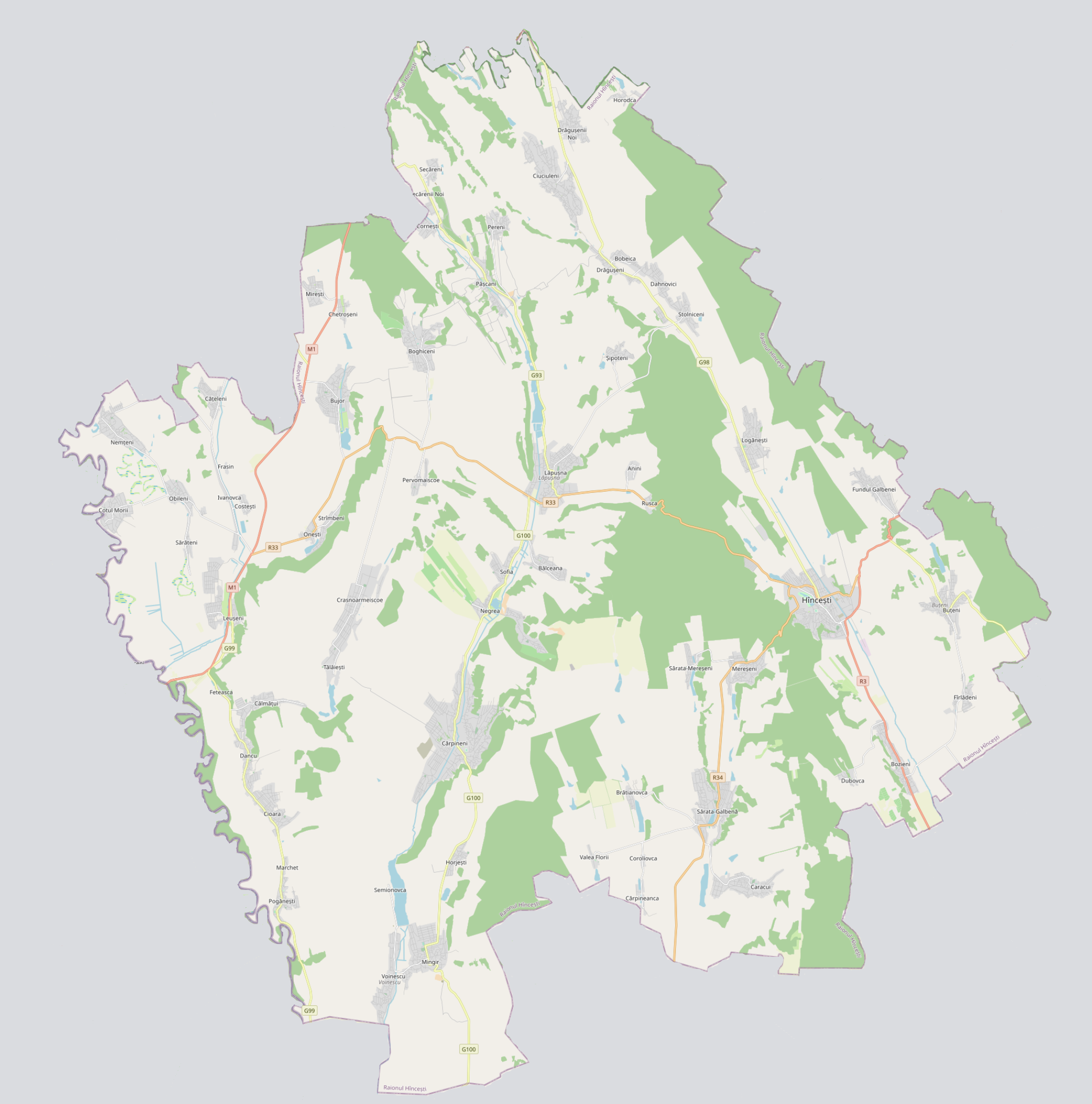
- Country: Republic of Moldova
- Administrative center (Oraș-reședință): Hîncești
- Established: 2002

Government
  - Raion President: Iurie Levinschi (2023) (PSDE)

Area
  - Total: 1,472.1 km^{2} (568.4 sq mi)
- Elevation: 350 m (1,150 ft)

Population (2024)
  - Total: 69,462
  - Density: 47.186/km^{2} (122.21/sq mi)
- Time zone: UTC+2 (EET)
  - Summer (DST): UTC+3 (EEST)
- Area code: +373 34
- Car plates: HN
- Website: www.hincesti.md

Hîncești (Romanian pronunciation: [hɨnˈtʃeʃtʲ]) is a district (Romanian: raion) of Moldova, with the city of Hîncești as its administrative center. As of the 2024 Moldovan census, its population was 69,462.

== History ==
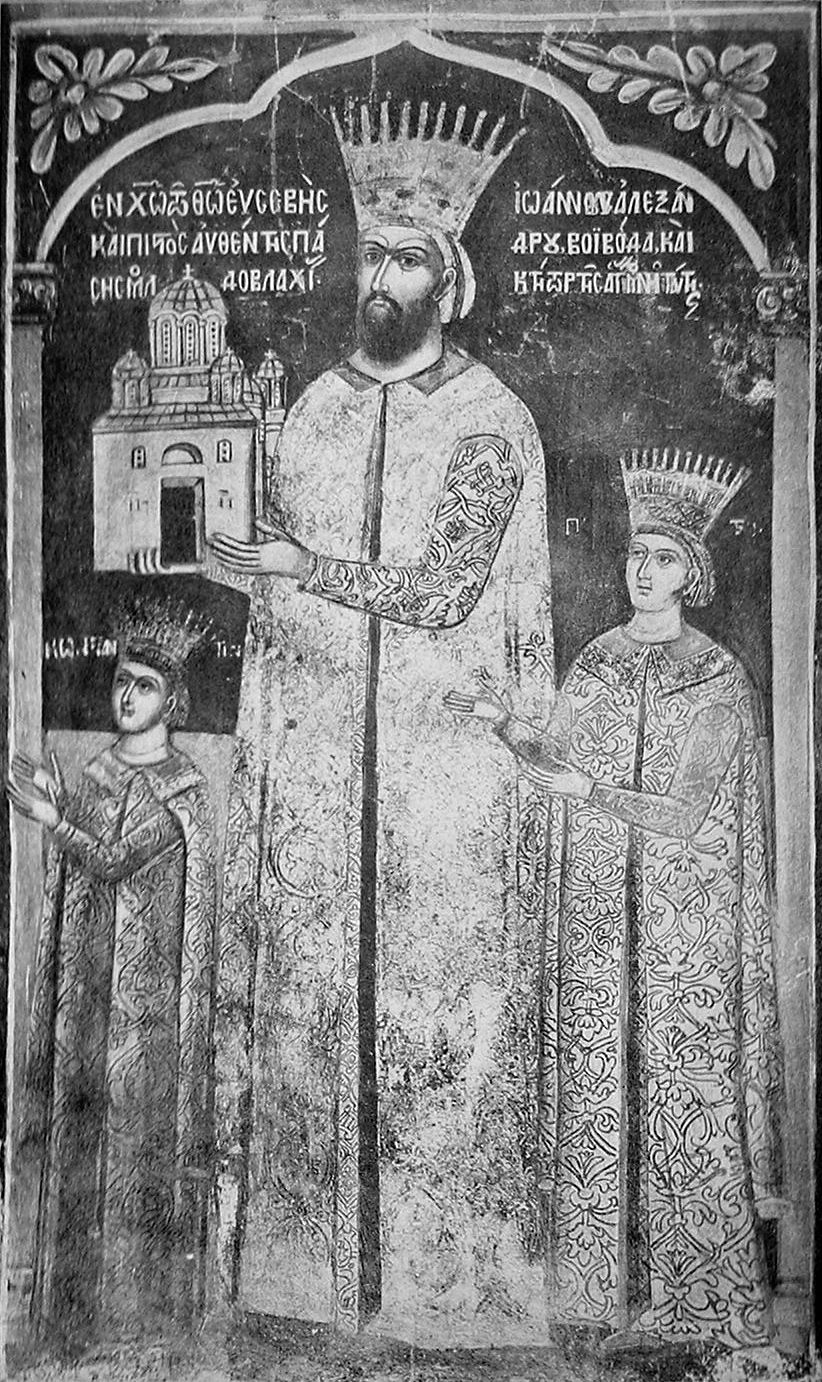
Alexandru Lăpușneanu (born in Lăpușna), Prince of Moldavia (1552–1561, 1564–1568)

The district has been inhabited since the Stone Age (40,000–30,000 BC). On the territory of the present localities Rusca and Anina many cemeteries and settlements pertaining to the native Getae culture (4th–3rd centuries BC) have been discovered. Localities with the earliest historical attestation are Secăreni, Leușeni, Lăpușna, and Ciuciuleni, which were first attested in the period 1420–1430. During the 15th–18th centuries, the district was part of Lăpușna. Tirgul Lăpușnei was the administrative center, headed by a pârcălab (governor). Lăpușna existed as a fair in the 14th century. A branch of the Moldovan Road passed by Lapusna, linking the economic centers of Transylvania and Poland to the North Pontic cities. The branch continued on over the Danube, in Dobruja, to Constantinople. Lăpușna Fair was a resting place for merchants, where they paid a small customs, besides the great customs from abroad. In 1489, Lăpușna was expressly recorded as a fair, thereby underlining its economic importance. After the conquest of Cetatea Albă and Chilia by the Turks, and Bugeac by Noha Tatars, the southern border of Moldova was moved farther north, closer to the region. Lăpușna has served as a resting place for many foreign travelers, officials, missionaries, ambassadors, and merchants. In 1812, after the Russo-Turkish War, the Russian Empire occupied the region of Basarabia, leading to an intense russification of the native population. In 1918, after the collapse of the Russian Empire, Bessarabia united with Romania. In this period (1918–1940 and 1941–1944), the district was part of the Lăpușna County. In 1940, after the Molotov–Ribbentrop Treaty, Basarabia was occupied by the USSR. In 1991, as a result of the proclamation of Independence of Moldova, the region became part of Lăpușna County (1991–2003), and in 2003 it became an administrative unit of Moldova.

== Geography ==
Hîncești District is located in the central part of the Republic of Moldova. Neighboring districts include Nisporeni District to the northwest, Strășeni District to the northeast, Ialoveni District to the east, Cimișlia and Leova districts to the south, and the border with Romania on the river Prut to the west. The topography is predominantly hilly with heights between 100 and 350 m. The landscape of the district is divided into three areas: the forested hills of Codru, the forested and less hilly steppe, and the steppe of Prut. The Codru forests are characterized by very complicated terrain. From north to south, the territory is intersected by the Cogâlnic River and the Galbena River. The forested steppe is characterized by gentler topography. The area is intersected by the Lapusna River and the Sărata River, a tributary of the Prut. The Prut steppe zone is characterized by a flatter and less wooded landscape. This area is crossed by the river Călmățui, which in Turkish translates as "white matter". Erosional processes differ in each area.

=== Climate ===
The climate is moderate continental, and highly variable. The average annual air temperature is 10 °C (50 °F). The average temperature in January is −4 °C (25 °F), the absolute minimum is −32 °C (−26 °F), and in July the average temperature is 22 °C (72 °F), with a maximum of 40 °C (104 °F). Annual rainfall is 500–650 mm.

=== Fauna ===
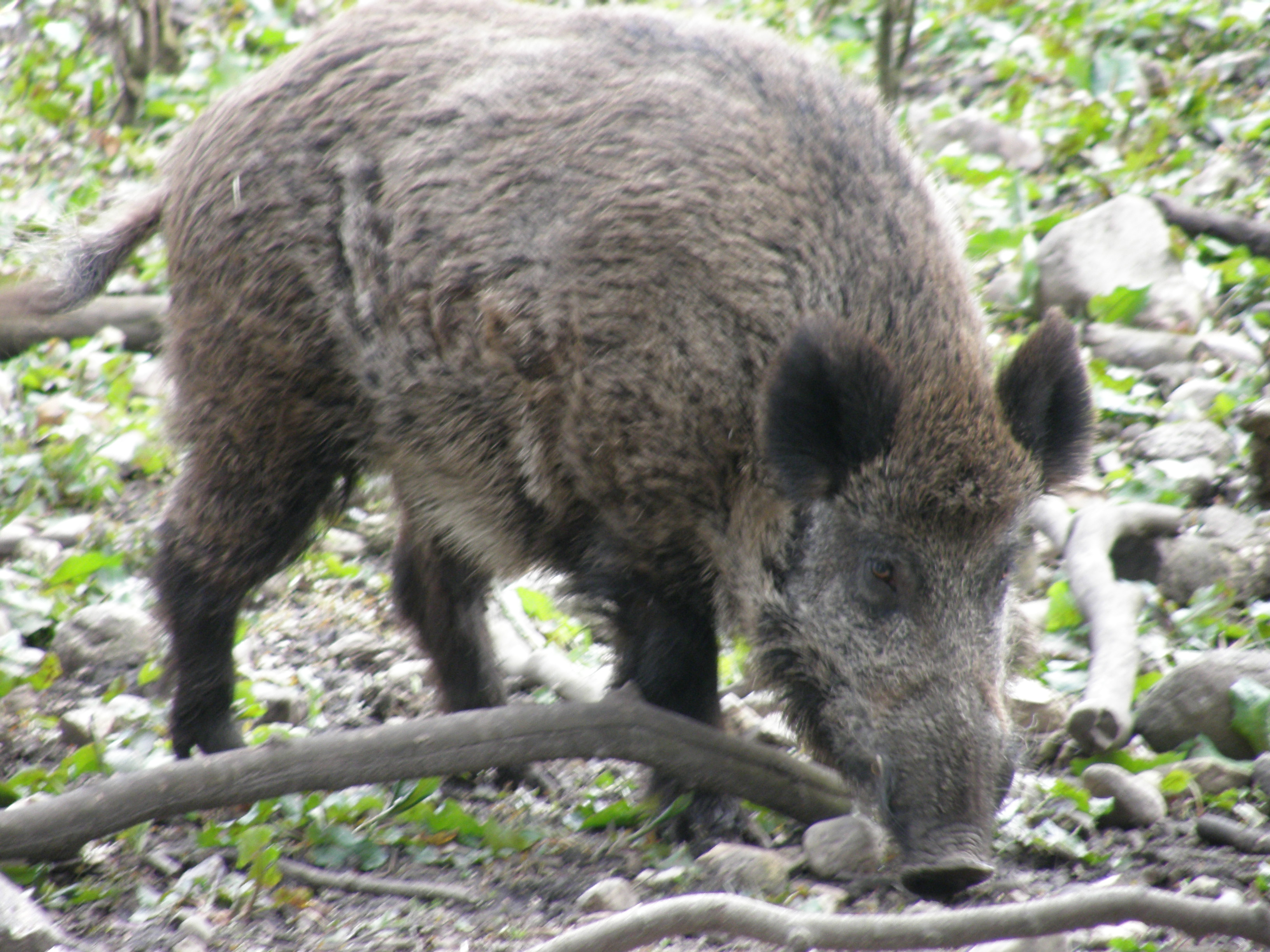
There are many wild boars in the district

The fauna are typical of Europe, and include mammals such as foxes, hedgehogs, deer, red deer, wild boar, wild cats, ermine, ferrets, and wolves and others. Birds include egrets, owls, crows, sparrows, starlings, and storks.

=== Flora ===
Forests occupy 18.5% of the district area, and consist of oaks, lindens, maples, beeches, acacias, and others. Other plants include bells, knotweeds, nettles, and wormwood.

== Administrative subdivisions ==
- Localities: 63
  - Administrative center: Hîncești
    - Cities: Hîncești
      - Villages: 24
        - Communes: 38

== Demographics ==
As of the 2024 Census, the district population was 69,462, of which 16.4% was urban and 83.6% was rural.

=== Ethnic groups ===
Ethnic group	% of total
Moldovans *	87.6
Romanians *	7.4
Ukrainians	3.4
Russians	0.6
Romani	0.5
Bulgarians	0.1
Gagauz	0.1
Other	0.2
Undeclared	0.0

Footnote: * There is an ongoing controversy regarding the ethnic identification of Moldovans and Romanians.

=== Religion ===
- Christians – 99.2%
  - Orthodox Christians – 94.2%
  - Protestant – 4.9%
- Muslim - 0.1%
- Other – 0.1%
- No Religion – 0.4%
- Not Declared - 0.5%

== Economy ==
Agriculture is the primary economic activity in the district. Products include wine, alcohol, bakery products, fruit, and sausages. All agricultural land is privately owned. There are 93,361 ha of agricultural land, including arable land (62.3%), vineyards (17.5%), and orchards (6.0%). Other products include shoes, clothes, furniture, and concrete building blocks.

== Education ==
The district has 59 educational institutions, teaching 18,908 children, 350 students in the College of Construction, and 600 in various professional schools. Currently there are 1600 teachers.

== Politics ==
The district traditionally supports right-wing parties, particularly the AEI. In the district, the PLDM had the highest percentage of votes of all of the districts of Moldova. Support for the PCRM has steadily declined.

During the last three elections support for the AEI had a 99.0% increase.

Parliament elections results
Year	AEI	PCRM
2010	72.20% 37,523	23.45% 12,190
July 2009	63.80% 32,070	33.00% 16,586
April 2009	38.49% 18,851	45.47% 22,271

=== Elections ===
Summary of 28 November 2010 Parliament of Moldova election results in Hincesti District
Parties and coalitions	Votes	%	+/−
Liberal Democratic Party of Moldova	26,555	51.09	+23.04
Party of Communists of the Republic of Moldova	12,190	23.45	−9.55
Democratic Party of Moldova	6,973	13.42	-3.06
Liberal Party	3,551	6.83	−7.29
Other Party	2,727	5.21	+2.01
Total (turnout 56.20%)	52,340	100.00	

== Culture ==
The district is home to two museums, 77 works of art, and 13 bands.

== Health ==
The district has two hospitals with 540 beds, a center for family doctors that has 25 family physician offices, 14 health centers, and 18 health points. There are 183 doctors and 472 medical staff and auxiliary.

== Tourism ==
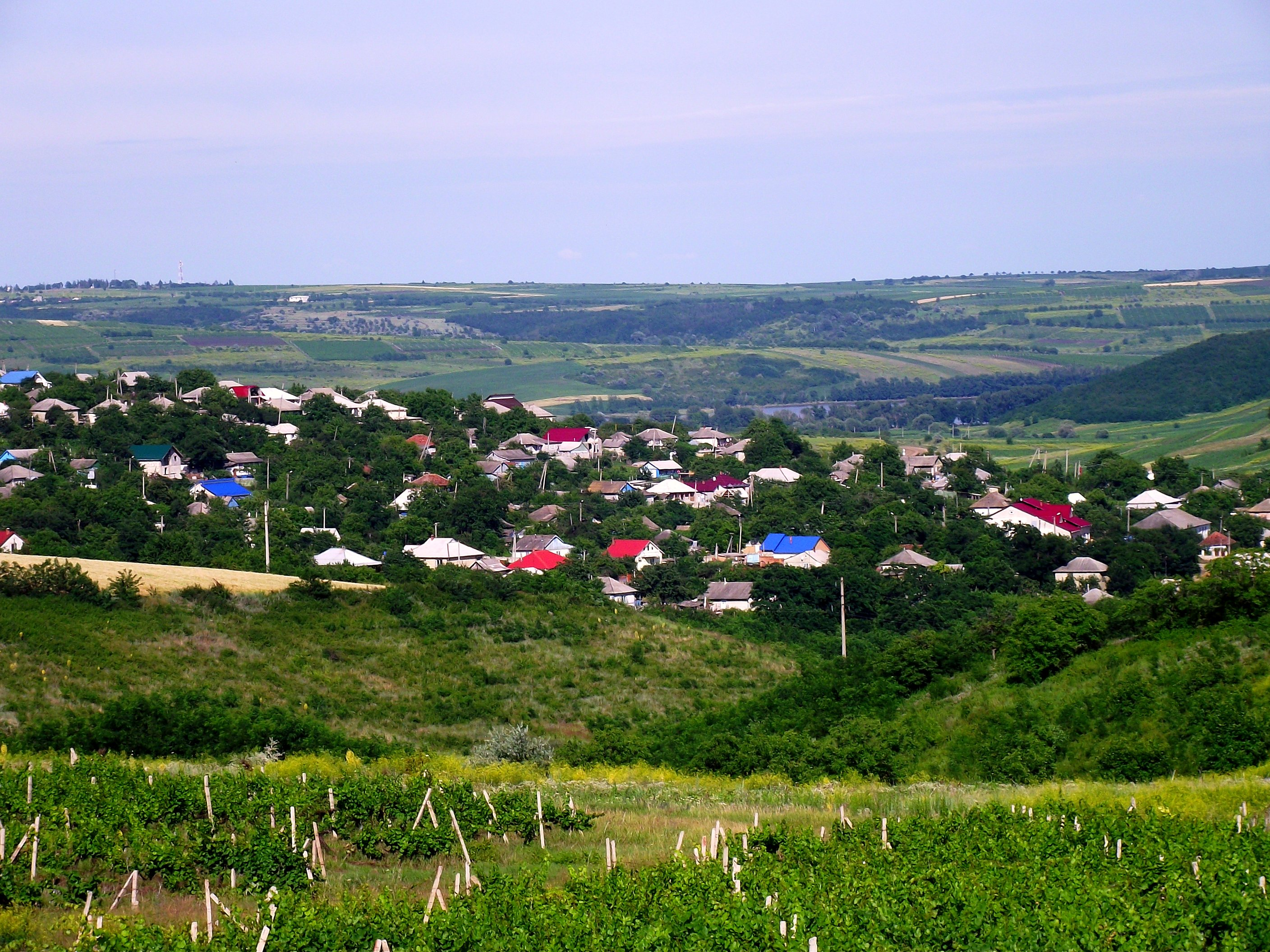

The council of the Romanian Vaslui County, the county councils of the Moldovan Leova and Hîncești districts, and the European Union (through the Phare program), have set up a program to promote tourism in these regions. The main tourist attractions of the Vaslui-Hîncești-Leova area are the medieval and early modern churches and monasteries, the Manuc Bei Hunting Palace and the Manuc–Mirzaian Manor Palace (similar to Manuc's Inn in Bucharest) in Hîncești, and the region's natural riches.

The district is home to the Hîncești Forest Landscape Reserve and two natural reserves for medicinal herbs (Sărata-Galbenă and Logănești).

== Sister communities ==
On 1 December 2017, the district partnered with Greenfield, Massachusetts to form a "sister community".
