= Leova District =

Coordinates: 46°30′N 28°25′E

- District (Raion)
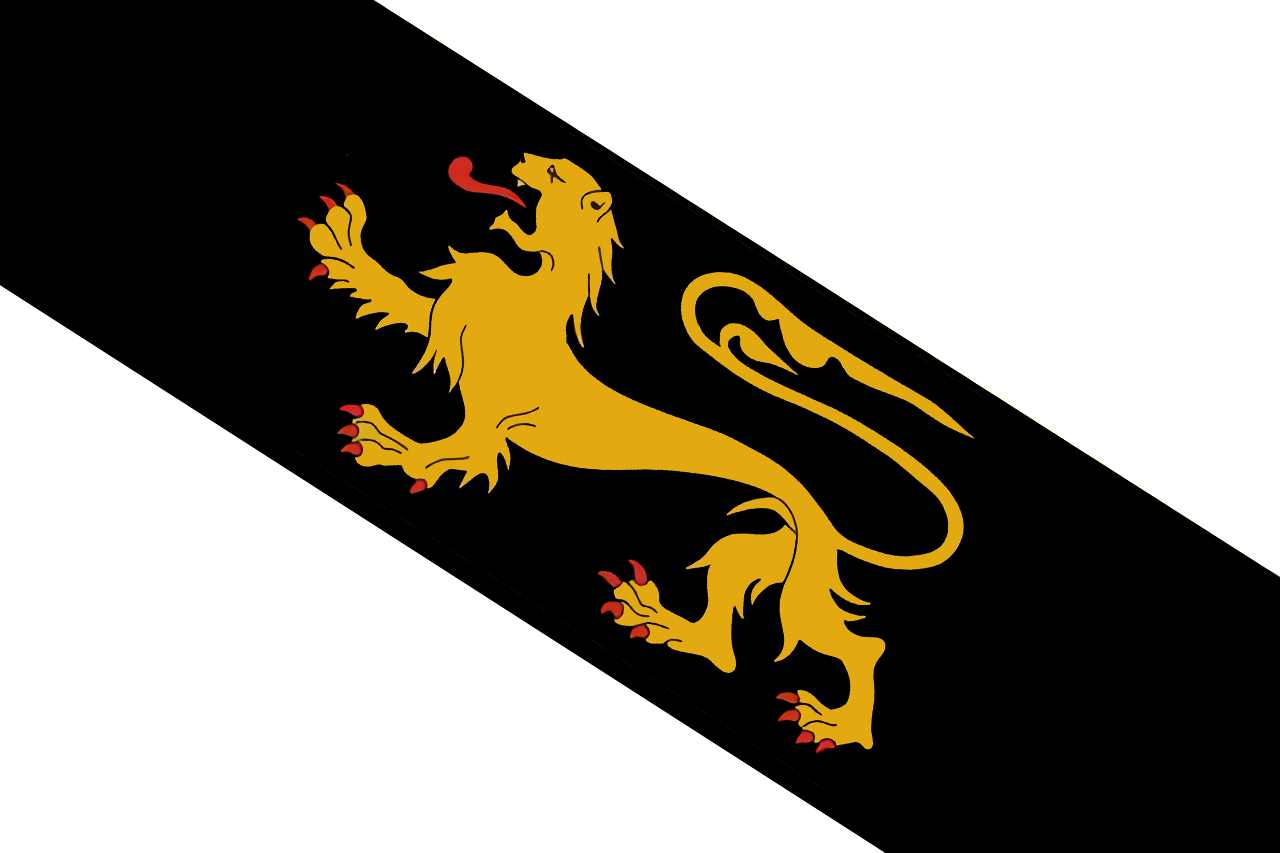
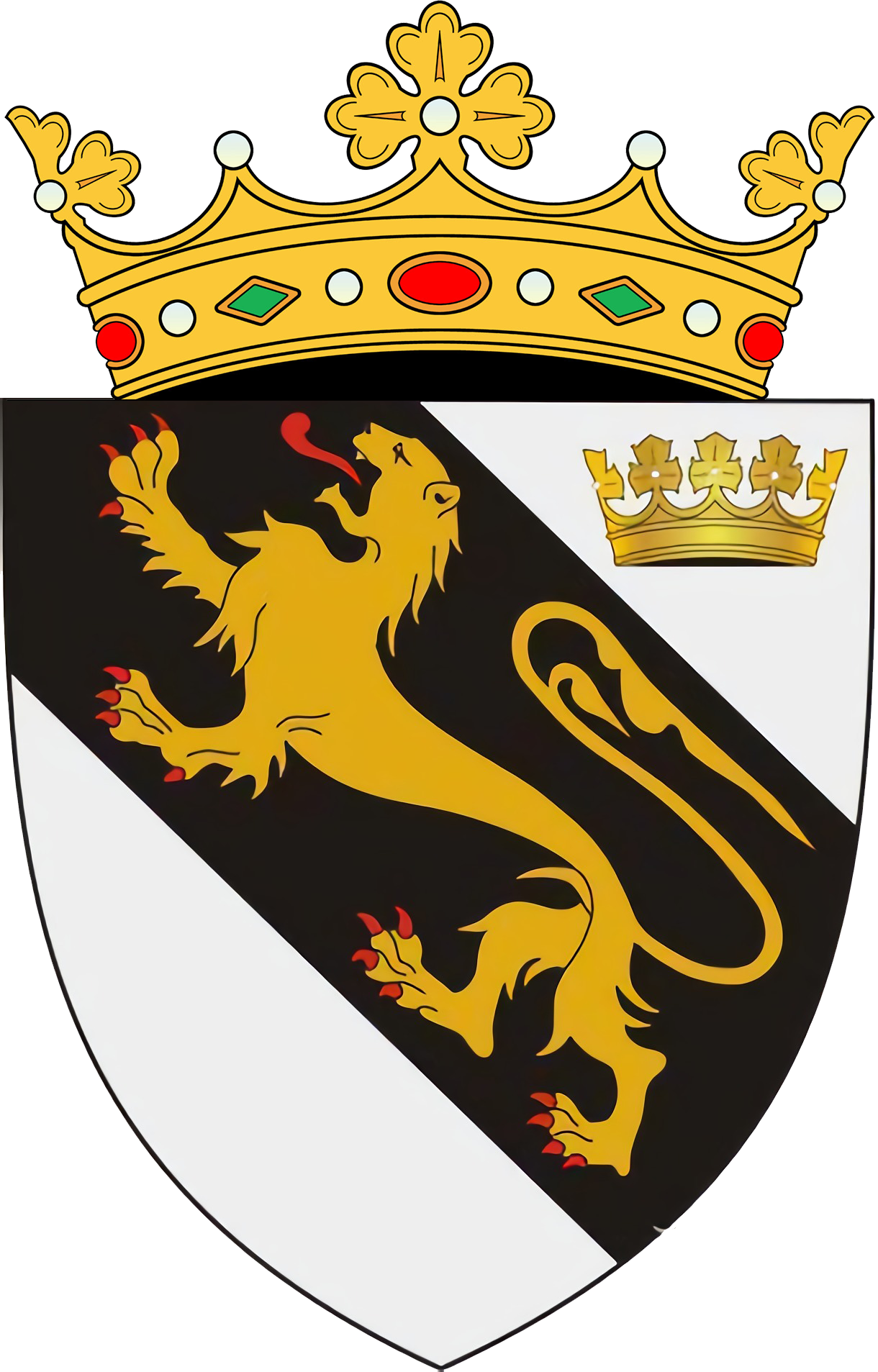
- Flag Coat of arms

- Country: Republic of Moldova
- Administrative center (Oraş-reşedinţă): Leova
- Established: 2002

Government
  - Raion president: Nicolae Popa (Party of Action and Solidarity), since 2023

Area
  - Total: 764.6 km^{2} (295.2 sq mi)
  - Water: 16.0 km^{2} (6.2 sq mi) 2.06%

Population (2024)
  - Total: 28,835
  - Density: 37.71/km^{2} (97.68/sq mi)
- Time zone: UTC+2 (EET)
  - Summer (DST): UTC+3 (EEST)
- Area code: +373 63
- Car plates: LV
- Website: www.leova.md

Leova District is a district (Romanian: raion) in the central part of Moldova, bordering Romania, with the administrative center at Leova. In the 2024 Moldovan census, its population was 28,835.

== History ==
The localities with the oldest documentary attestation of the district are Tigheci, Tochile-Răducani, and Leova; they were first attested in the period 1436-1489. In the 16th and 17th centuries, trade and agriculture developed in Principality of Moldavia, and there was a significant population increase. During this period, the Tîrgul Sărata (Leova today), was developing intensively. After the Russo-Turkish War (1806–1812), the region was annexed by the Russian Empire, and became part of the Bessarabia Governorate from 1812 to 1917, there is an intense russification of the native population. In 1918, after the Russian Revolution and the collapse of the Russian Empire, Bessarabia united with Romania. From 1918 to 1940 and again from 1941 to 1944, the district was part of the Lăpușna County, in the Kingdom of Romania. In 1940, after the Molotov–Ribbentrop Pact, Bessarabia was occupied by the Soviet Union. Towards the end of World War II, the district became part of the Moldavian SSR. In 1991, as a result of the proclamation of the Independence of Moldova, it became part and residence of Lapușna County (1991–2003), and in 2003 it became an administrative unit of Moldova.

== Geography ==
Leova District is located in the southwest part of the Republic of Moldova. Its neighbors are as follows: Hîncești District in the north, Gagauzia and Cimișlia District in the east, Cantemir District in the south, and the state border with Romania in the west, on the river Prut. The relief is generally plain, but with altitudes above 250 m (820 ft) in the northern part of the district (the southern extremity of Central Moldavian Plateau), elevations of 150–200 m (490–660 ft) in the south (extreme north of the Tigheci Plateau), and 20–100 m (66–328 ft) the plains of the river Prut. Erosion processes occur with a medium intensity.

=== Climate ===
Temperate continental climate with an annual average district temperature of 10.5 °C (51 °F). July average temperature is 22 °C (72 °F) and January −4 °C (25 °F). Annual precipitation is 450–550 mm and average wind speed is 3–6 m/s.

=== Fauna ===
Typical European fauna, with the presence of mammals such as foxes, hedgehogs, deer, wild boar, polecat, wild cat, ermine, and others. Birds include: partridges, crows, eagles, starling, swallow, and more.

=== Flora ===
Forests occupy 13.0% of the district; they are complemented by tree species such as oak, ash, hornbeam, linden, maple, walnut and others. Plants include: wormwood, knotweed, fescue, nettle, and many others.

=== Rivers ===
The main river is the Prut River, which crosses the western district in favor of Romania. Its main tributary that crosses the district is the Sarata River. Most lakes are of artificial origin.

== Administrative subdivisions ==
- Localities: 40
- Administrative center: Leova
- Cities: Iargara, Leova
- Villages: 14
- Communes: 20

== Demographics ==
As of the 2024 Census, the district's population was 28,835, of which 30.8% urban and 69.2% rural population.

=== Ethnic groups ===
Ethnic group	% of total
Moldovans *	85.8
Romanians *	5.8
Bulgarians	5.2
Ukrainians	1.2
Russians	1.0
Gagauz	0.5
Romani	0.3
Other	0.1
Undeclared	0.0

Footnote: * There is an ongoing controversy regarding the ethnic identification of Moldovans and Romanians.

=== Religion ===
- Christians - 99.4%
  - Orthodox Christians - 97.7%
  - Protestant - 1.7%
- Other - 0.1%
- No religion - 0.3%
- Not Declared - 0.2%

== Economy ==
In the district are 11,859 total registered businesses. The share of agricultural land is 57,071 ha (73.6%) of total land area. The arable land occupies 37 925 ha (48.9%) of the total agricultural land, of which 1229 ha plantation of orchards (1.6%), vines 4718 ha (6.1%), pasture 11,617 ha (15.0%), some 1582 ha (2.0%).

== Education ==
In Leova district working 34 educational institutions, including: Total number of students, including 7833 children in schools, in preschool institutions in 2009 children, 280 polyvalent vocational schools students.

== Politics ==
Voters traditional in the district Leova, said mainly center-right parties, particularly the AEI. PCRM the last three elections is in a continuous fall.

During the last three elections AEI had an increase of 57.2%

Parliament elections results
Year	AEI	PCRM
2010	53.23% 12,151	35.79% 8,171
July 2009	53.42% 11,814	41.23% 9,120
April 2009	34.90% 7,715	48.20% 10,654

=== Elections ===
Summary of 28 November 2010 Parliament of Moldova election results in Leova District
Parties and coalitions	Votes	%	+/−
Party of Communists of the Republic of Moldova	8,171	35.79	−5.44
Liberal Democratic Party of Moldova	6,561	28.74	+13.43
Democratic Party of Moldova	4,290	18,79	+4.54
European Action Movement	1,364	5.97	+5.97
Liberal Party	1,182	5.18	−5.81
Other Party	1,271	5.53	-12.69
Total (turnout 53.96%)	22,999	100.00	

== Culture ==
In district works: two museums, artistic works 55, 14 bands, holding the title of the band - model, public libraries - 37.

== Health ==
In district works: a hospital, the general fund of 190 beds, 1 center of family doctor's in the composition of which are 16 family physician offices, 7 health center's, 11 health points.

== Tourism ==
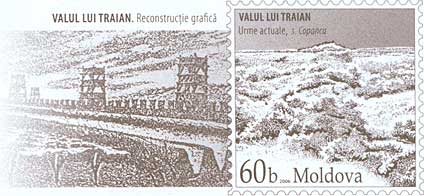
Trajan's Wall (graphic reconstruction)

The council of the Romanian Vaslui County, the county councils of the Moldovan Leova and Hînceşti districts, and the European Union (through the Phare program), have set up a program which seeks to promote tourism in these regions. The main tourist attractions of the Vaslui-Hînceşti-Leova touristic program are, among others, the medieval and early modern churches and monasteries, the Manuc Bei Hunting Palace and the Manuc - Mirzaian Manor Palace (similar to Manuc's Inn in Bucharest) in Hînceşti, as well as the region's natural riches.

- Trajan's Wall, who had started the course in the village of Filipeni, through Troita and follows the road to Cimislia. This monument dates back to the Trajan's Dacian Wars.
- The wooden church from Covurlui. This church is built of wood, was built in 1805, closed in 1959 and reopened in 1989.
- Monument of nature - tree secular. Oaks located in the city Leova, Street Gorghi 8, Hall Leova land owner. The tree is 214 years old.
- Church dedicated St. Voievozi, s. Michael and Gabriel in Borogani. The old church was built in 1811 of wood.
