= Anti-Soviet resistance in Moldova =

Armed conflict in the Moldovan Soviet Socialist Republic from 1945 to 1950

- Part of Anti-communist insurgencies in Central and Eastern Europe
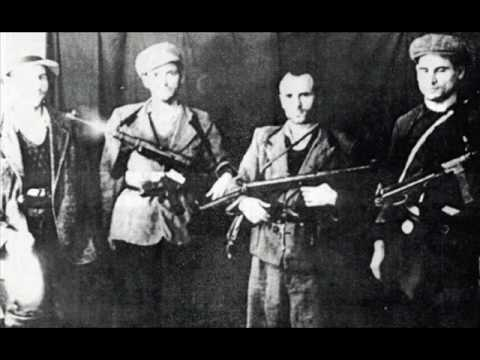
- Members of the Black Army.
Date	1945–1950
Location	Moldovan SSR (Center and North)
Result	Soviet victory: NKVD arrests members of all the armed groups

Belligerents
Soviet Union: Moldovan SSR	Moldovan Resistance Groups: Black Army (1949–1950); Arcașii lui Ștefan (1945–1947); Sabia Dreptății (1947–1950); Vocea Basarabiei (1945–1948)

Commanders and leaders
Lavrentiy Beria; Sergei Kruglov	Black Army: Gavril Andranovici; Gavril Bodiu; Ion Bors; Vladimir Cazacliu; Vladimir Teodorovic Arcașii lui Ștefan: Vasile Bătrânac; Victor Solovei; Nicolae Prăjină; Teodosie Guzun; Anton Romașcan; Nichita Brumă Sabia Dreptății: Ion Moraru

Units involved
NKVD	

Strength
	Black Army: 100–50; Sabia Dreptății:10; Arcașii lui Ștefan: 140

The Anti-Soviet resistance in Moldova was a period of Anti-Soviet clandestine and armed activity resistance in the Moldavian Soviet Socialist Republic (MSSR), presently Moldova. The resistance happened mainly in Center and North Moldova. The conflict was mainly caused by the Soviet famine of 1946-1947, and massive deportations made by Soviets in the Moldovan SSR.

The main groups were composed mostly of teachers and students from schools and universities around the MSSR, along with peasants, unsatisfied with the living conditions, who decided to create armed organizations against the Soviet Government.

== Activity ==
=== Initial Activities (1945-1948) ===
After World War II, Moldova was put under Soviet control again. It was not the only SSR with only anti-soviet activity, with anti-communist resistance groups organising in Ukraine, Belarus, and the Baltic States. The first groups to form in 1945, were the Vocea Basarabiei, and the National Organization of Bessarabia "Arcașii lui Ștefan" ("Archers of Stefan") (Abbreviated "NOB-ALS").

The NOB-ALS was founded in October 1945, on the territory of the former Soroca County by teachers Vasile Bătrânac, Victor Solovei, Nicolae Prăjină, Teodosie Guzun, and Anton Romașcan, as well as a student, Nichita Brumă. by March 1947, it had more than 140 members.

These organizations were active during the Soviet famine of 1946–1947, which also affected Moldova. Another organization founded was the Sabia Dreptății which was an organization from Bălți, the organization was initiated by Ion Moraru and Vasile Țurcanu, and Petru Lungu also joined them, who were former students at the Pedagogical School of Bălți in 1947.

It initially was part of the combat detachment called "Sabia Dreptății" (of Ştefan cel Mare), within the National Organization of Bessarabia "Arcaşii lui Ştefan", and it did activity in the localities of Mândâc, Slănina, Drochia, Șuri, Chetrosu and Drochia's station. One of the many daily activities of the group was writing defiant letters to the courts. The most caustic ones were sent to the Writers' Union, and to Stalin, considered by the leaders as being "leader of the demons". All the letters were signed with the "Sabia Dreptății".

Young activists of the organization insisted on a speedy transition to armed struggle, threatening otherwise to create their own organization. On March 9, 1947, a meeting was held at which this plan was approved in principle, although without specifying a clear time frame. Somewhat earlier, Vasile Bătrânac established contact with the peasant Vasile Baleanu, the leader of the National Christian Anti-Soviet Organization. An agreement was reached on joint actions.

On 23 March 1947, Vasile Bătrânac, leader of the NOB-ALS, was arrested by the NKVD secret police, who found a detailed list of the organization's members in his possession. Shortly after, all members, including the other leaders of "Arcașii lui Ștefan", were apprehended by the Soviet authorities. On 11 June, Bătrânac was sentenced to 25 years forced labor and sent to a camp in Siberia. However, Sabia Dreptății continued to exist. It is unknown what happened to Vocea Basarabiei, but it ceased to exist in 1948.

=== Black Army and End of Activities (1949-1950) ===
In July 1949, the USSR Ministry of State Security carried out Operation “South” - the mass deportation of “unreliable” Moldovan families on socio-political grounds. Rumors spread about the upcoming continuation of this action. Irreconcilable anti-Soviet elements turned to armed resistance.

A few days after the deportation, anti-communist peasants from Balti district Gavril Andranovich, Ion Bors, Vladimir Cazacliu and Vladimir Teodorovic decided to create an armed group called the Armata Neagră ("Black Army"). Initially, its leader was Andranovich, who enjoyed the authority of a strong master.

It didn't take long before information about the partisans actions reached the NKVD, but after an operation in August, Ion Bors was the only one of all the members of the group to be caught. Under the guise that he will help them to get their hands on the others, he is let free, only he will not respect this agreement and will join the pursuit. The secret police lose their trail, if only briefly. Meanwhile, the number of Black Army partisans was growing. Gavril Bodiu, who had killed a Soviet tax collector in an altercation, found refuge among them. It was he who would take command of the group in the first months after its foundation. Other notable members who join them in this period are Gheorghe Bogatu and Vasile Padure, the latter making a spectacular escape from militia custody. The NKVD agents manage in the meantime to track down the partisans again, only this time they do not rush. It was not until October 1949 that a major action took place, in which the movement's leader, Gavril Bodiu, was killed.

A few months passed before Ion Ganea and Ion Bors, who had escaped arrest, managed to bring together the remnants of the resistance movement. People from dozens of villages swelled the ranks or gave support to the remaining partisans, hiding them in need or providing them with supplies. The Black Army still had its say. The deportations sanctioned by the Soviet Union, the onerous agricultural taxes, the obligatory entry into Moldova, and the attempts to erase the identity of the Romanians beyond the Prut gave rise to discontent. As a result, not only was the Black Army able to recover from the mass arrests of August 1949, but it managed to keep growing, even more than in the previous year.

==== Armed Activities ====
The most active attacks were carried out in the spring of 1950. On May 1, the Black Army disrupted an official celebration of Labour Day in the village of Curtoaia. On May 19, Teodor Coşcodan, Gheorghe Buruiană, Ion Gania and Sergiu Antoch attacked local functionaries of the All-Union Communist Party (Bolsheviks) in the village of Volcinets. Almost a week later, led by Teodor Coscodan and Ion Ganea, the partisans enter the village of Dereneu where they take the school principal at a small price, but the president of the local colhoz does not escape easily. They also devastate the cooperative's shop and take part of the goods. On May 21, in the village of Cornova, insurgents attacked the militia and seized weapons. A series of attacks were carried out on stores, cooperative trade points and bank branches, and serious material damage was caused. The seized state and cooperative property was often distributed among villagers.

On June 6, 1950 Ion Bors, Ion Coşcodan Jr., Vasile Plesca and Hariton Chelpan fired at the car of functionaries at the Cornesti district committee of the CPSU (b). On June 18, in the village of Leordoaia,Teodor Coşcodan banned the organization of a collective farm, threatening to kill activists. On July 6, Teodor Coscodan, Ion Bors, Vladimir Teodorovic, Vasile Plesca and Hariton Chelpan killed the chairman of the council in the village of Flamanzeni.

By the summer of 1950, the “Black Army” had up to 50 armed fighters, and the total number of those involved reached 100. The state security agencies saw it as a serious danger. Many fighters were killed in clashes. Peasants who assisted the “Black Army” were severely persecuted. Several operations were carried out to capture the leaders. This was done by recruiting contacts who were guaranteed amnesty and a large cash reward. Subsequently, these promises were usually not fulfilled, and informants were arrested on general grounds and sentenced to long terms.

==== Cessation of activities ====
The arrests of the members of Sabia Dreptății began in May 1950. Ion Moraru was arrested in his native village, and Vasile Țurcanu was apprehended during the exam on the "Moldovan language" at the Pedagogical School of Bălți. On November 24, 1950, according to the ruling of the Supreme Court of the MSSR, 10 members and supporters of the clandestine organization "Sabia Dreptății " were condemned for anti-Soviet activity. ending the organization.

Theodor Coşcodan, Ion Coşcodan Jr. and Ion Bors were shot on their sentences. Maria Buruiană, Gheorghe Buruiană, Vladimir Teodorovich and a number of others served terms ended up in correctional labor camps. About 40 people received 25-year sentences. The last trial - of two dozen sympathizers - was held in February 1951. With it, marking the end of the Black Army, and the conflict.

== Aftermath ==
Maria Buruiană, who had no history of violent actions, was released in the summer of 1956. Vladimir Teodorovich, one of the founders and commanders of the Black Army, returned to his homeland in 1972 after serving his sentence.

One of the fighters, Simion Margarinth, hid for 25 years with a sympathetic peasant woman, Yelizaveta Vartoshu. In 1972, he met with the returning Teodorovich. Margarinth was discovered by the authorities in 1975 and arrested while trying to resist, but released two weeks later and accepted onto a collective farm. He was distinguished by his conscientious work and deep religiousness. He died in 1988.
