= Nimereuca =

- Commune
- Interactive map of Nimereuca
- Location in Moldova
- Coordinates: 48°07′N 28°32′E
- Country: Moldova
- District: Soroca District

Population (2014)
  - Total: 3,054
- Time zone: UTC+2 (EET)
  - Summer (DST): UTC+3 (EEST)

Nimereuca is a commune in Soroca District, Moldova. It is composed of two villages, Cerlina and Nimereuca.

== Nimereuca village ==
Nimereuca (Russian: Немировка, romanized: Niemirovka, Ukrainian: Німереука, romanized: Nimereuka, Polish: Niemirówka) lies on the northeastern periphery of Moldova, close to its tripoint with Ukraine and the breakaway region of Transnistria. Located on a slope along the Dniester River, the village has over 200 wells. The Jewish agricultural colony of Lublin was founded in what is now Nimereuca in 1842.

=== History ===
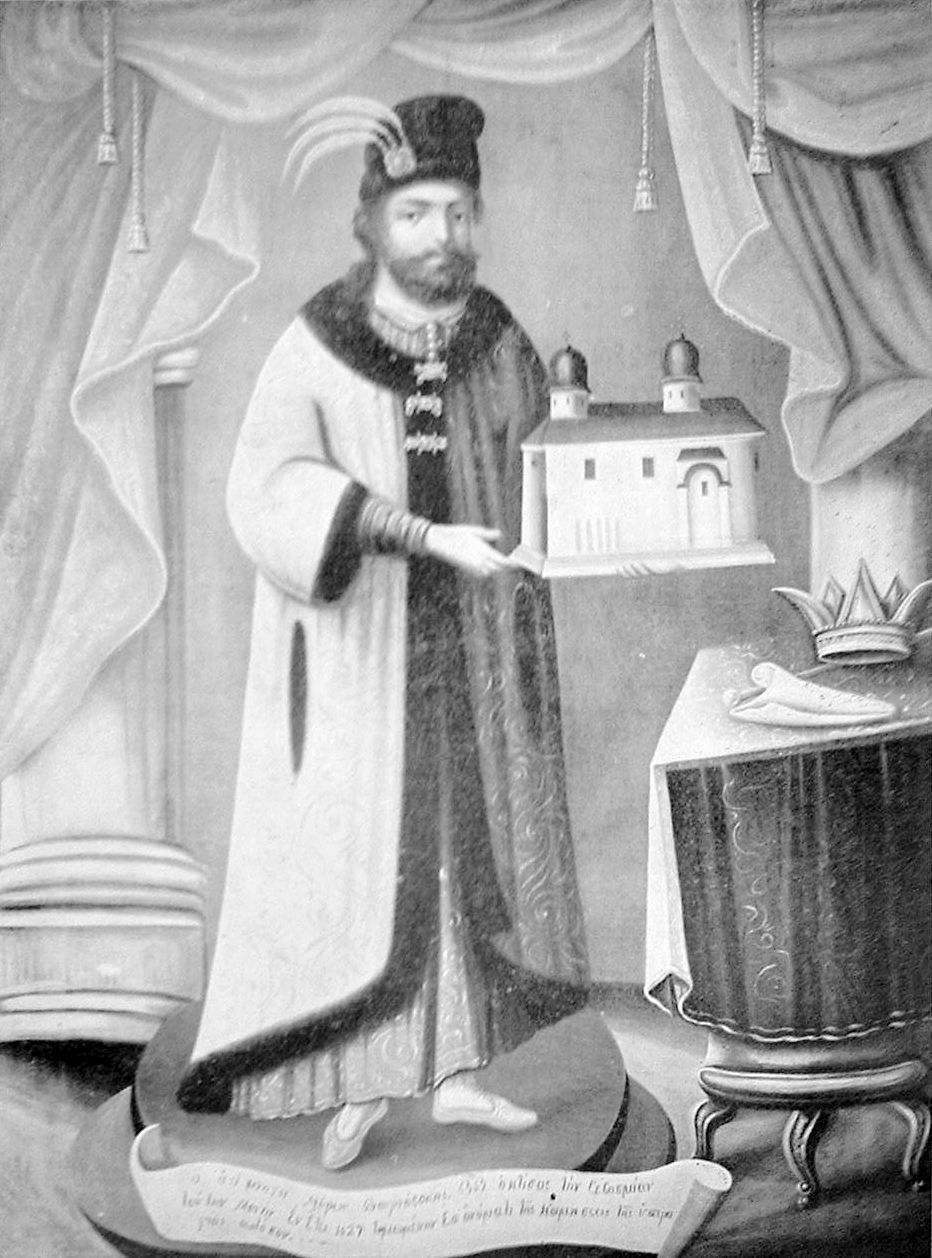
The first mention of Nimereuca in historical documents dates from when boyar Miron Barnovschi-Movilă (Miron Barnowski-Mohyła) was elevated to the rank of hetman during the reign of Radu Mihnea.

The first mention of Nimereuca in historical documents dates to March 24, 1624, when boyar Miron Barnovschi-Movilă (Miron Barnowski-Mohyła) was elevated to the rank of hetman during the reign of Radu Mihnea. Nimereuca is mentioned as one of the villages that was part of Barnovschi's estate. The name Nemireuca is ascribed to a local pan (noble) named Nemirca who ruled over the area during the reign of Alexander the Good during the 15th century. The surname Nemirca (Niemirka in Polish) ultimately derives from the Slavic given name Niemir.

The census from 1772-1773 alludes to a church in the village, which records dating to 1781 list as being dedicated to the Dormition of the Mother of God. Similarly to other churches in the area, this structure was likely built of twigs, smeared with clay, and covered with reeds. A church school was established in 1862. That sacred space has been modified but still occupies the same site on the bank of the Dniester. Construction on a new stone church began in 1913. That church was closed in 1948 and transformed into a seed depot which functioned until 1985. After a major overhaul, the church has been restored to its original function.

The entire region of Bessarabia was annexed by the Russian Empire in 1812 after the end Russo-Turkish War, and with it, Nimereuca came under Russian rule. Romania regained the province a century later when the German Empire allowed Romania to annex Bessarabia in exchange for free passage of German troops toward Ukraine during World War I. Along with the county councils of Bălți and Orhei, Soroca was among the first to ask for the newly proclaimed Moldavian Democratic Republic to unify with the Kingdom of Romania. Although a Bessarabian Soviet Socialist Republic was proclaimed by the Bolsheviks as an autonomous part of Russian SFSR in 1919, it was abolished by the military forces of Poland and France in September of that year during the Polish–Soviet War.

==== Jewish agricultural colony of Lublin ====
===== Background =====
The 1818 Statutory Law (Așezământul) of the Russian Governorate of Bessarabia mentions Jews as a separate state (social class), which was further divided into merchants, tradesmen, and land-workers. Unlike the other states in Russia, Jews were not allowed to own agricultural land, with the exception of "empty lots only from the property of the state, for cultivation and for building factories".

===== Settlement =====
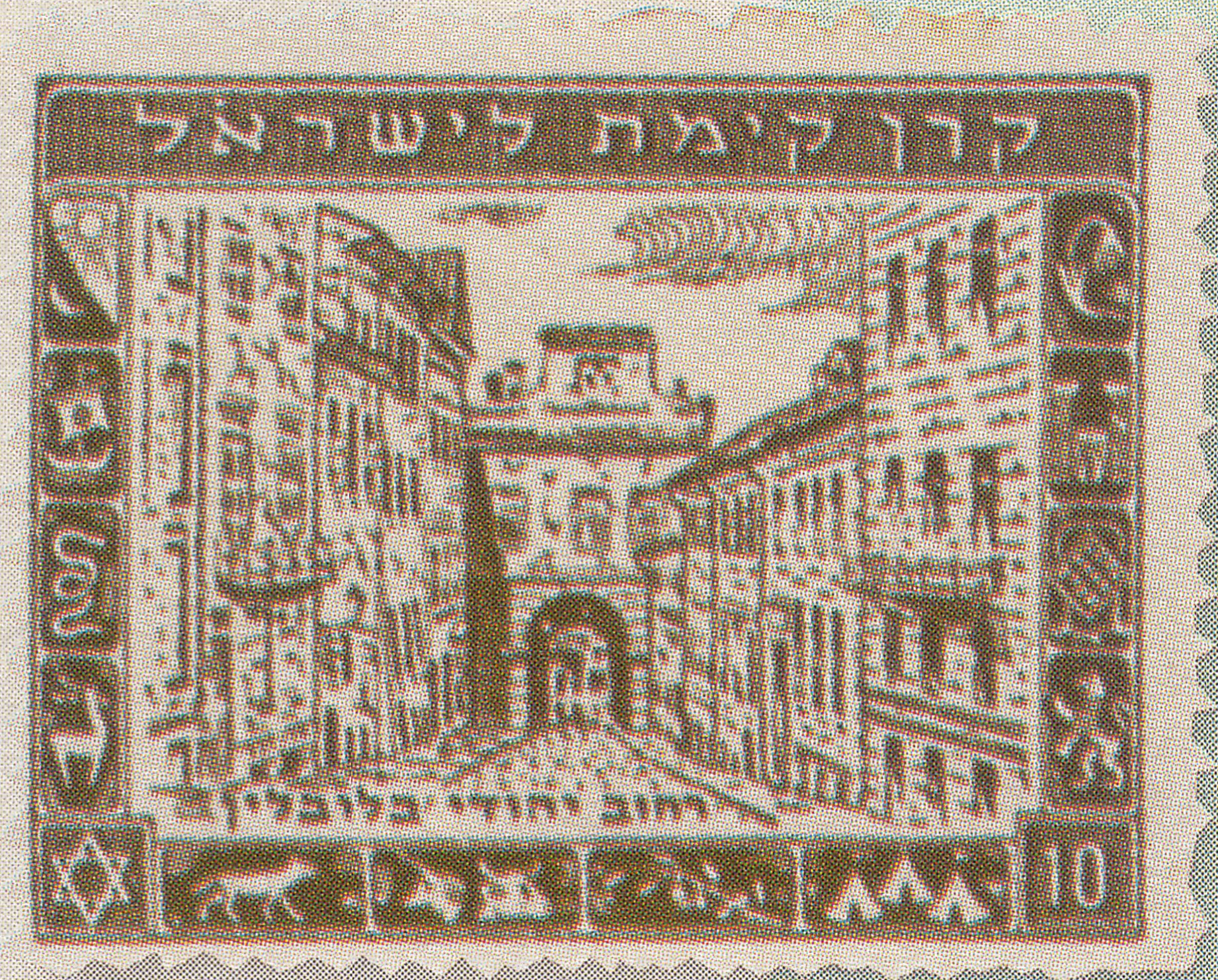
The Lublin colony in what is now Nimereuca owes its name to the city of Lublin, Poland, which prior to the Holocaust was one of the most vibrant Jewish communities in this part of Europe. This postage stamp depicts Grodzka Gate in that city's Jewish Quarter.

To encourage settlement in the newly annexed area, Tsar Nicholas I issued an ukaz (decree) which allowed Jews to settle in Bessarabia "in a higher number", exempting Jews who moved here from taxation for 2 years. At the same time, Jews from Podolia and Kherson Governorate were exempted from taxation for 5 years if they crossed the Dniester and relocated to Bessarabia. The size of this migration became so large that merchant activity was not enough to sustain the Jewish population of Bessarabia, which led the Tsarist authorities to create 17 Jewish agricultural colonies. Of these, 9 were located in Soroca County where Nimereuca is located. These were Dumbrăveni, (now part of Vădeni commune), Brăciova (Bricevo, now Briceva, part of Târnova commune in Dondușeni district, Mărculești (formerly Starăuca/Starovka), Vârtojani (Vertiujeni, formerly Șteap), Căprești, (now part of Florești commune) Zguriţa, Maramonovca, Constantinovca and Lublin in what is now Nimereuca. The Jewish agricultural colony of Lublin was officially founded in 1842 on 528 dessiatines of land. By 1856, it was home to 45 Jewish families, and a decade later, that number grew to 75.

The settlement owed its name to the city of Lublin, one of Poland's most important Jewish communities and who were a vital part of that city's life until the Holocaust, during which they were relocated by Nazi Germany to the infamous Lublin Ghetto where they were ultimately murdered. Lublin in Poland was at one time referred to as "the Jewish Oxford," and the rosh yeshiva (headmaster) received the title of rector from the Polish King in 1567, with rights and privileges equal to those of the heads of Polish universities.

A wave of pogroms in the Russian Empire in 1881–1882 and in Kishinev in 1903 seem to have had little effect on these villages. Jews had become a significant part of Bessarabia’s agricultural life on the eve of the First World War, with major roles in its tobacco, wine, fruit, and dairy sectors. The Jewish Colonization Association (known as the ICA from its name in Yiddish) began to support the Bessarabian colonies in the 1890's.

By 1914, 42,000 people lived in the Jewish agricultural colonies of the south of the Russian Empire. As a result, in a short period of time a new stratum of Jewish farmers appeared in the Russian Empire, which by the middle of the nineteenth century accounted for 3% of the country's Jewish population, and in Bessarabia this figure reached 16%.

===== Holocaust =====
Lublin's subsequent history follows that of the rest of Bessarabia, where it was under Romanian rule from 1919 until August 1940 when the USSR takes over the area. On June 22, 1941 the Axis invasion of the Soviet Union commenced with Operation Barbarossa. Between June 22 and July 26, 1941, Romanian troops with the help of Wehrmacht recovered Bessarabia as well as northern Bukovina. The Soviets employed scorched earth tactics during their forced retreat from Bessarabia, destroying the infrastructure and transporting movable goods to Russia by railway. At the end of July, after a year of Soviet rule, the region was once again under Romanian control.

There were cases of Romanian troops "taking revenge" on Jews in Bessarabia during this military operation, in the form of pogroms on civilians as well as the murder of Jewish POWs, resulting in several thousand dead. These forces justified the murder of local Jews by claiming that in 1940 some Jews welcomed the Soviet takeover as liberation. At the same time the notorious SS Einsatzgruppe D, operating in the area of the German 11th Army, committed summary executions of Jews under the pretext that they were spies, saboteurs, Communists, or under no pretext whatsoever.

Some claim that Romanian dictator Marshal Ion Antonescu preferred expulsion rather than extermination as the political solution to the "Jewish Question" in Romania. However, that portion of the Jewish population of Bessarabia and Bukovina which did not flee before the retreat of Soviet troops (147,000) was initially gathered into ghettos or Nazi concentration camps, and then deported during 1941–1942 in death marches into Romanian-occupied Transnistria, where they perished as part of the "Final Solution".

After the USSR reoccupied the area in 1944, most of the Jewish community which survived emigrated to Israel.

== Cerlina ==
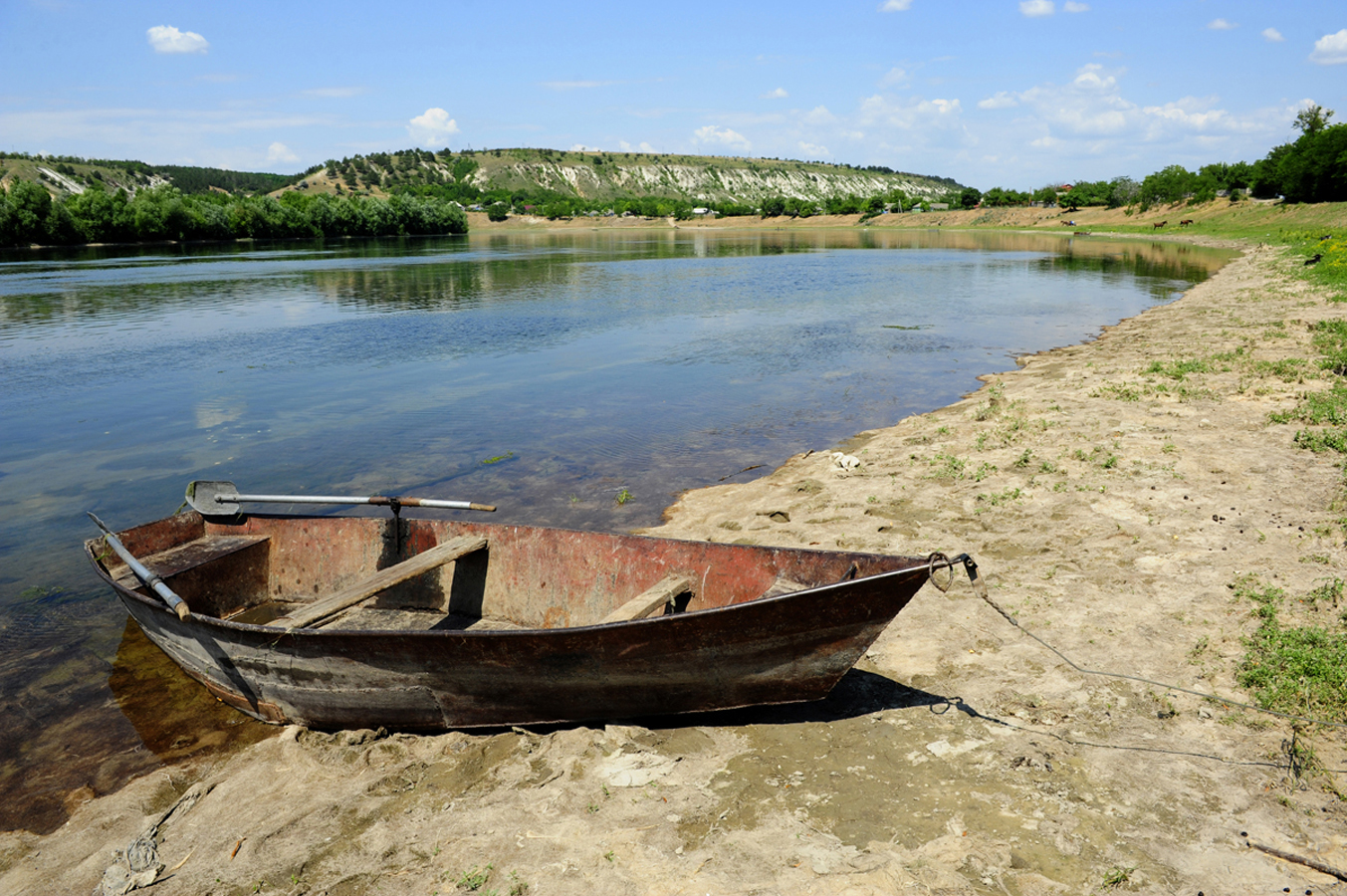
A view of the Dniester River in Cerlina

Cerlina (Russian: Черлина, romanized: Cherlina, Ukrainian: Черлiна, romanized: Cherlina, Polish: Cierlina), the commune’s other village, is located about 7 kilometers southwest of Nimereuca following the course of the Dniester.

An outcrop dating from the Upper Proterozoic is visible at a bend in the Dniester River in Cerlina.

== Notable people ==
- Iurie Țap
