= Popeștii =

Popeștii may refer to:

- Popeştii de Jos, a commune in Drochia District, Moldova
- Popeştii de Sus, a commune in Drochia District, Moldova
- Popeştii Noi, a village in Petreni Commune, Drochia District, Moldova
- Popeștii de Jos and Popeștii de Sus, villages in Vadu Moților Commune, Alba County, Romania
