= Sabia Dreptății =

Anti-Soviet organization in the Moldavian SSR

- Formation: 1945
- Dissolved: 1947
- Type: anti-Soviet group
- Location: North of Bessarabia
- Official language: Romanian
- Leader: Ion Moraru
- Staff: 10

Sabia Dreptății (English: The Sword of Justice) was one of the organized anti-Soviet groups in Bălți, Bessarabia.

== Overview ==
Sabia Dreptății was initiated by students Petre Lungu and Ion Moraru from Bălți. This anti-Soviet armed resistance group was active in Bălți during the Stalinist era. "Sabia Dreptății" based at the Pedagogical Lycée (former Ion Creangă Lycée) in Bălți.

Moraru was an anti-communist writer and activist in Bessarabia. For one year, he was imprisoned in the same camp at Ekibastuz with Aleksandr Solzhenitsyn.

== Formation of the organization ==
Sabia Dreptății was an anti-Soviet organization from Bălți, the Moldavian Soviet Socialist Republic. The organization was initiated by Ion Moraru and Vasile Țurcanu, and Petru Lungu also joined them, the last two were students at the Pedagogical School of Bălți in 1947 (?) (founded on the basis of the former Ion Creangă High School). This anti-Soviet group of armed resistance activated in Bălți and in the localities from which their members came from: Mândâc, Slănina, Drochia, Șuri, Chetrosu and Drochia's station the Stalin time. Initially, the members of the group were considered the combat detachment called "Sabia Dreptății" (of Ştefan cel Mare), within the National Organization of Bessarabia "Arcaşii lui Ştefan". One of the many daily activities of the group was writing defiant letters to the courts. The most caustic ones were sent to the Writers' Union, as most of the lies started from there, and to Stalin, considered by the leaders as being "leader of the demons". All the letters were signed with the "Sabia Dreptății". The organization was discovered by MGB in 1950.

== Arrests of the organization members ==
In May 1950, have started the arrests of the anti-Soviet organization members of Sabia Dreptății. Ion Moraru was arrested in his native village, and Vasile Țurcanu during the exam on "Moldovan language" at the Pedagogical School of Bălți. On November 24, 1950, according to the ruling of the Supreme Court of the MSSR, 10 members and supporters of the clandestine organization "Sabia Dreptății " were condemned for anti-Soviet activity:

1. Eugen Guțu, born in 1912, Drochia village, Târnova District. During the war years, he was a soldier in the Romanian Army. Accused of "complicity with the German-Romanian occupants" and anti-Soviet activity. Sentenced to 25 years of imprisonment in labor camps with suspension of the civil rights for a term of five years and confiscation of assets;
2. Mihail Gheorghelaș, born in 1915, Drochia village, Târnova district. Accused of "complicity with the German-Romanian occupants" and in anti-Soviet activity. Sentenced to 25 years of detention in labor camps with suspension of civil rights for a term of five years and confiscation of assets;
3. Pavel Istrati, born in 1894, Mândâc village, Târnova District. Accused of anti-Soviet activity and collaboration with "German-Romanian occupiers". It was incriminated to him that in 1941 he organized, together with other "Kulak" from the village of Mândâc, a solemn reception "to the Romanian occupants", especially to the chief of the gendarmerie, and then, in 1942, "taking the floor at an organized meeting. by the occupation authorities, he called on the population to give assistance to the occupation armies in the fight against the Soviet Army and spoke unrespect fully about the Soviet Union". Sentenced to 25 years of imprisonment in labor camps with suspension of civil rights for a term of five years and co-confiscation of assets;
4. Vasile Oleinic, born in 1904, Slănina village, Târnova District. Sentenced to 10 years of imprisonment with suspension of civil rights for a term of five years;
5. Alexandru Bobeică, born in 1922, Drochia village, Târnova District. During the war years, he was a soldier in the Romanian Army. The village photographer. Sentenced to 10 years of imprisonment with suspension of civil rights for a term of five years;
6. Ion Moraru, born in 1929, Mândâc village, Târnova District. Teacher at primary school in Șuri village. Sentenced to 10 years of imprisonment with suspension of civil rights for a term of five years;
7. Petru Lungu, born in 1930, Cotiujeni village, Lipcani District, student of the Pedagogical School in Bălți. Sentenced to 10 years of imprisonment with suspension of civil rights for a term of five years;
8. Vasile Țurcanu, born in 1932, Drochia village, Târnova District, student of the Pedagogical School in Bălți. Sentenced to 10 years of imprisonment with suspension of civil rights for a term of five years;
9. Chiril Morărescu, born in 1916, Șuri village, Drochia District. The guard at the popular court in Drochia district. Sentenced to 10 years of imprisonment with suspension of civil rights for a term of five years;
10. David Leahu, born in 1915, Drochia village, Târnova District. Privater tailor. Sentenced to 10 years of imprisonment with suspension of civil rights for a term of five years.

According to art. 33 of the Criminal Code of the USSR, the last 5 were declared "particularly socially dangerous " and after the punishment they had to be exiled for 10 years in the remote regions of the USSR.

== Honours ==
On August 23, 2010, the interim president of the Republic of Moldova, Mihai Ghimpu, signed the decree related to granting the Order of the Republic to a group of fighters against the totalitarian-communist regime of occupation, including the members of the organization "Sabia Dreptății": Ion Moraru, Eugen Guțu (post- mortem), Gheorghelaș Mihail (post-mortem) and Istrati Pavel (post-mortem).

== Bibliography ==
- Elena Postică, "Sabia Dreptății", în Ţara, 1995, 19, 26 ianuarie
