= Antoneuca =

- Village
- Location within Moldova
- Coordinates: 48.075°N 27.6938888889°E
- Country: Moldova
- District: Drochia District

Government
  - Mayor: Svetlana Văcaru (PDM)

Population (2014 census)
  - Total: 489
- Time zone: UTC+2 (EET)
  - Summer (DST): UTC+3 (EEST)

Antoneuca is a village in Drochia District, Moldova. At the 2004 census, the commune had 479 inhabitants.
