= Sofia, Drochia =

Sofia
- Village
- Location in Moldova
- Coordinates: 48°6′N 27°48′E
- Country: Moldova
- District: Drochia District

Population (2014 census)
  - Total: 4,137
- Time zone: UTC+2 (EET)
  - Summer (DST): UTC+3 (EEST)

Sofia is a village in Drochia District, Moldova. At the 2004 census, the commune had 4,823 inhabitants.

== Notable people ==
- Lidia Istrati (1941–1997)
- Iulian Filip (born 1948)
