= Pervomaiscoe, Drochia =

Pervomaiscoe
- Commune
- Location within Moldova
- Coordinates: 48.0869444444°N 27.7238888889°E
- Country: Moldova
- District: Drochia District

Population (2014)
  - Total: 896
- Time zone: UTC+2 (EET)
  - Summer (DST): UTC+3 (EEST)

Pervomaiscoe is a commune in Drochia District, Moldova. It is composed of two villages, Pervomaiscoe (formerly Căetănești) and Sergheuca (formerly Serghiești). At the 2004 census, the commune had 897 inhabitants.
