= Șalvirii Vechi =

- Commune
- Location within Moldova
- Coordinates: 48.1958°N 27.8486°E
- Country: Moldova
- District: Drochia District

Population (2014)
  - Total: 732
- Time zone: UTC+2 (EET)
  - Summer (DST): UTC+3 (EEST)
- Postal code: MD-5231

Șalvirii Vechi is a commune in Drochia District, Moldova. It is composed of three villages: Ceapaevca, Iliciovca and Șalvirii Vechi. At the 2004 census, the commune had 1,082 inhabitants. The commune is 214 metres (705 ft) above sea level.
