= Hănășești =

Hănăşeşti may refer to several villages in Romania:

- Hănăşeşti, a village in Gârda de Sus Commune, Alba County
- Hănăşeşti, a village in Poiana Vadului Commune, Alba County

== Hăsnăşeni ==
- Hăsnăşenii Mari, a commune in Drochia district, Moldova
- Hăsnăşenii Noi, a commune in Drochia district, Moldova.
