= Miciurin =

Village in Drochia District, Moldova

- Village
- Location within Moldova
- Coordinates: 47.9866666667°N 27.7925°E
- Country: Moldova
- District: Drochia District

Government
  - Mayor: Galina Catlabuga (PN)

Population (2014 census)
  - Total: 1,483
- Time zone: UTC+2 (EET)
  - Summer (DST): UTC+3 (EEST)

Miciurin (formerly Ghica-Vodă) is a village in Drochia District, Moldova, named by the Soviets after the anti-genetics propagandist Ivan Vladimirovich Michurin. At the 2004 census, the commune had 1,608 inhabitants.
