= Zgurița =

Village in Drochia District, Moldova

Zgurița זגוריצע
- Village
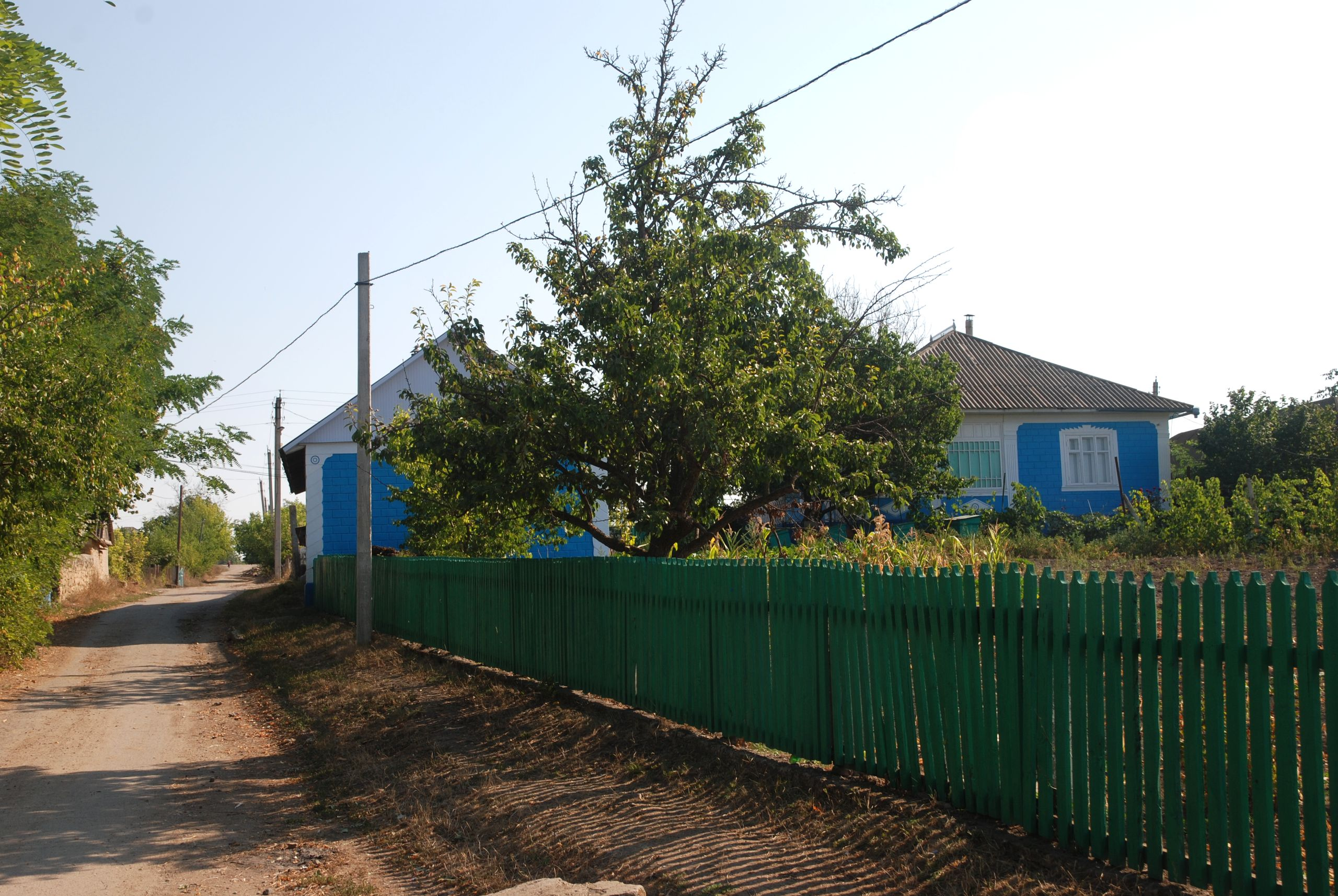
- Zgurita, center

- Location within Moldova
- Coordinates: 48.1269444444°N 28.0097222222°E
- Country: Moldova
- District: Drochia District

Government
  - Mayor: Victor Guțu (Independent)

Population (2014 census)
  - Total: 2,065
- Time zone: UTC+2 (EET)
  - Summer (DST): UTC+3 (EEST)

Zgurița (Yiddish: זגוריצע, romanized: Zgaritza) is a village in Drochia District, in the north of Moldova. At the 2004 census, it had a population of 2,840.

== History ==
The village was founded by merging three localities: Zgura in the North, Nicorești in North-West, two Romanian villages mentioned before 1812, and Zgurița (little Zgura), in South-West, a Jewish agricultural colony founded in 1853 on an area of over 1,000 acres (4.0 km^{2}) rented by Jewish settlers in Bessarabia. It was the last Jewish agricultural settlement in Bessarabia. Nicorești was eventually separated from Zgurița.

In 1878, the new Jewish owner canceled the lease of the estate, and Zgurița lost its status as a Jewish agricultural colony. From 1890 to 1903 further Jewish settlement in Zgurița was prohibited by virtue of the May Laws issued by the Russian Tsarist authorities on May 3, 1882.

In 1897, Zgurița's Jewish population was 1,802, comprising 85% of the total population of the village. In 1918, Bessarabia united with Romania. The Romanian agrarian reform in 1922 granted plots of land to 150 Jews of Zgurița. In 1925, the 193 members of the local loan fund included 40 farmers, 25 artisans, and 113 tradesmen.

At the 1930 census, Zgurița had a population of 3,028. It was part of Plasa Bădiceni of Soroca County. The Zionist Tarbut organization supported a kindergarten and an elementary school.

In 1940, the Soviet Union with the consent of Nazi Germany, occupied Bessarabia, and created the Moldavian SSR, closing privately owned businesses, and religious schools. The agricultural community was collectivized. A year later, Romanian Army, now allied with the Nazi Germany, drove the Soviets out and recovered Bessarabia. On July 3, 1941, Jews of Zgurița who did not flee were rounded up, sent to temporary ghettos in Bessarabia, and soon after were deported to Transnistria, where they were crammed into small area ghettos, subject to malnutrition and disease. The majority of Jews died in Transnistria.

In 1944, Soviets recovered Bessarabia, and re-established Moldavian SSR. The village's last Jewish resident, mill owner Motl Weinberg, left in 2001. At the dissolution of the Soviet Union in 1991, it became the independent Republic of Moldova. Today, the population of the village is largely Moldovan, with some Ukrainians and Russians.

The Jewish cemetery, which had been neglected for some years, was fenced in 2020 by the ESJF European Jewish Cemeteries Initiative with funds provided by the German government. The former Tarbut school was expanded and now is a public school.

== Demographics ==
Ethnic composition
Ethnic group	1930 census	2004 census
Jews	2,541	–
Moldovans	N/A	1,912
Romanians	212	16
Ruthenians and Ukrainians	13	774
Russians	258	118
Bulgarians	–	5
Gypsies	–	3
Poles	2	1
Gagauzians	–	1
others	2	10
Total	3,028	2,840

Native language
Language	1930 census	2004 census
Yiddish	2,535	N/A
Romanian	192	N/A
Russian	290	N/A
Ukrainian	8	N/A
Polish	3	N/A
other	–	N/A
Total	3,028	2,840

== Famous residents ==
- Svetlana Yakir, Russian writer
- Elazar Kochva, Israeli herpetologist
- Mordechai Goldenberg, Hebrew writer and Yiddish poet
- Yenta Mash, Yiddish writer
- Pedro and Mauricio Sprinberg, Yiddish journalists
- Solomon Zimiles, Yiddish writer
