= Gribova =

- Village
- Location within Moldova
- Coordinates: 48.0141666667°N 27.9283333333°E
- Country: Moldova
- District: Drochia District

Government
  - Mayor: Igor Grozavu (PDCM)

Population (2014 census)
  - Total: 2,050
- Time zone: UTC+2 (EET)
  - Summer (DST): UTC+3 (EEST)

Gribova is a village in Drochia District, Moldova.

== Demographics ==
According to the 2014 Moldovan census, Gribova had a population of 2,050 residents. Covering an area of 14.80 square kilometers, the commune had a population density of approximately 34.7 people per square kilometer. Between the 2004 and 2014 censuses, the population declined by 2.1%. The village spans an area of 44.9 km², giving it a population density of approximately 45.7 inhabitants per square kilometer as of 2014. Between the 2004 and 2014 censuses, Gribova experienced a slight population decline of 0.61%.

Women made up 53.5% of the population, while men accounted for 46.5%. The age structure showed that 16.1% of residents were under the age of 15, 67.1% were of working age (15–64), and 16.7% were aged 65 or older. The entire population lived in rural areas.

Most residents (97.5%) were born in Moldova, with a small percentage (2.5%) from other Commonwealth of Independent States countries. The majority of the population identified as Moldovans (88%), with smaller communities of Romanians (4.5%), Romani (3.8%), Ukrainians (2.8%), and Russians (0.9%). Moldovan was the most commonly spoken native language (80.5%), followed by Romanian (13.4%), with smaller numbers speaking Ukrainian (2.3%), Romani (2%), and Russian (1.9%). The dominant religion was Orthodox, followed by 98% of the population, while 2% adhered to other religious beliefs.

== Administration and local government ==
Gribova is governed by a local council composed of eleven members. The most recent local elections, in November 2023, resulted in the following composition: 8 councillors from the Party of Development and Consolidation of Moldova, 1 councillor from the Party of Socialists of the Republic of Moldova, 1 councillors from the Party of Action and Solidarity, and Ion Pînzari who ran independently. In the same elections, the candidate from the Party of Development and Consolidation of Moldova, Igor Grozavu, was elected as mayor.
