= Hăsnășenii =

Hăsnășenii may refer to one of two places in Moldova:

- Hăsnășenii Mari, a commune in Drochia district
- Hăsnășenii Noi, a commune in Drochia district
