= Palanca, Drochia =

Palanca
- Commune
- Location within Moldova
- Coordinates: 48.1244444444°N 27.9202777778°E
- Country: Moldova
- District: Drochia District

Population (2014)
  - Total: 715
- Time zone: UTC+2 (EET)
  - Summer (DST): UTC+3 (EEST)

Palanca is a commune in Drochia District, Moldova. It is composed of three villages: Holoșnița Nouă, Palanca and Șalvirii Noi. At the 2004 census, the commune had 901 inhabitants.
