= Pelinia =

- Commune
- Location within Moldova
- Coordinates: 47.8758333333°N 27.8313888889°E
- Country: Moldova
- District: Drochia District

Government
  - Mayor: Titus Sărăteanu (Independent)

Population (2014 census)
  - Total: 7,394
- Time zone: UTC+2 (EET)
  - Summer (DST): UTC+3 (EEST)

Pelinia is a commune in Drochia District, Moldova. It is composed of two villages, Pelinia and Pelinia, loc. st.c.f. (Pelinia station). At the 2004 census, the commune had 7,538 inhabitants. Pelinia is the largest commune in Moldova.

== Media ==
- Vocea Basarabiei 101,0
