= Baroncea =

- Commune
- Location within Moldova
- Coordinates: 48.0266666667°N 27.9183333333°E
- Country: Moldova
- District: Drochia District

Population (2014)
  - Total: 1,534
- Time zone: UTC+2 (EET)
  - Summer (DST): UTC+3 (EEST)

Baroncea is a commune in Drochia District, Moldova. It is composed of two villages, Baroncea and Baroncea Nouă. At the 2004 census, the commune had 1,609 inhabitants.
