= Dominteni =

- Village
- Location within Moldova
- Coordinates: 47.9547222222°N 27.9516666667°E
- Country: Moldova
- District: Drochia District

Government
  - Mayor: Mihail Focșa (BEPPEM)

Population (2014 census)
  - Total: 1,183
- Time zone: UTC+2 (EET)
  - Summer (DST): UTC+3 (EEST)

Dominteni is a village in Drochia District, Moldova. At the 2004 census, the commune had 1,402 inhabitants.
