= Cotova =

- Commune
- Location within Moldova
- Coordinates: 48.1591666667°N 27.9575°E
- Country: Moldova
- District: Drochia

Government
  - Mayor: Berladean Ion (PSRM)

Population (2014)
  - Total: 2,954
- Time zone: UTC+2 (EET)
  - Summer (DST): UTC+3 (EEST)
- Postal code: 5214

Cotova is a commune in Drochia District, Moldova. It is composed of two villages, Cotova and Măcăreuca. At the 2004 census, the commune had 3,569 inhabitants.
