= Popeștii de Sus =

- Village
- Location within Moldova
- Coordinates: 48.0897222222°N 28.0225°E
- Country: Moldova
- District: Drochia District

Government
  - Mayor: Iurie Grosu (PDM)

Population (2014 census)
  - Total: 1,463
- Time zone: UTC+2 (EET)
  - Summer (DST): UTC+3 (EEST)

Popeștii de Sus is a village in Drochia District, Moldova. At the 2004 census, the commune had 1,784 inhabitants.

== Story ==
On 13 January, 1971, the villages of Upper Popesti (Popeştii de Sus) and Lower Popesti (Popeştii de Jos) were merged into the village of Popesti (Popeştii). In 1990, the villages were separated again.

== Geography ==
The village is located at an altitude of 131 meters above sea level.

== Population ==
According to the 2004 census, 1,784 people (863 men, 921 women) live in the village of Verkhnie Popeshty.

Ethnic composition of the village:

Nationality	Population	Percentage
Moldovans	1755	98.37
Romanians	11	0.62
Russians	8	0.45
Ukrainians	7	0.39
Bulgarians	1	0.06
Other	2	0.11
Total	1784	100%
