= Nicoreni =

- Village
- Location within Moldova
- Coordinates: 47.9661111111°N 27.7030555556°E
- Country: Moldova
- District: Drochia District

Government
  - Mayor: Mihail Rotaraș (PLDM)

Population (2014 census)
  - Total: 2,832
- Time zone: UTC+2 (EET)
  - Summer (DST): UTC+3 (EEST)

Nicoreni is a village in Drochia District, Moldova. At the 2004 census, the commune had 3,420 inhabitants.
