= Maramonovca =

Village in Drochia District, Moldova

- Village
- Location within Moldova
- Coordinates: 48.2025°N 27.8008333333°E
- Country: Moldova
- District: Drochia District

Government
  - Mayor: Vasile Cubei (Independent)

Population (2014 census)
  - Total: 1,952
- Time zone: UTC+2 (EET)
  - Summer (DST): UTC+3 (EEST)

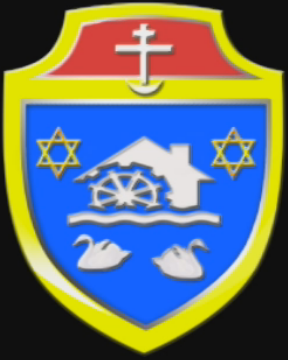
Coat of arms of the village of Maramonovka, Moldova

Maramonovca is a village in Drochia District, Moldova. At the 2004 census, the commune had 2,666 inhabitants.
