= Prodănești =

Prodăneşti may refer to several villages in Romania:

- Prodăneşti, a village in Berești-Meria Commune, Galați County
- Prodăneşti, a village in Creaca Commune, Sălaj County
- Prodăneşti, a village in Ioneşti Commune, Vâlcea County

and to:

- Prodăneşti, a commune in Florești District, Moldova
