= Anti-communist insurgencies in Central and Eastern Europe =

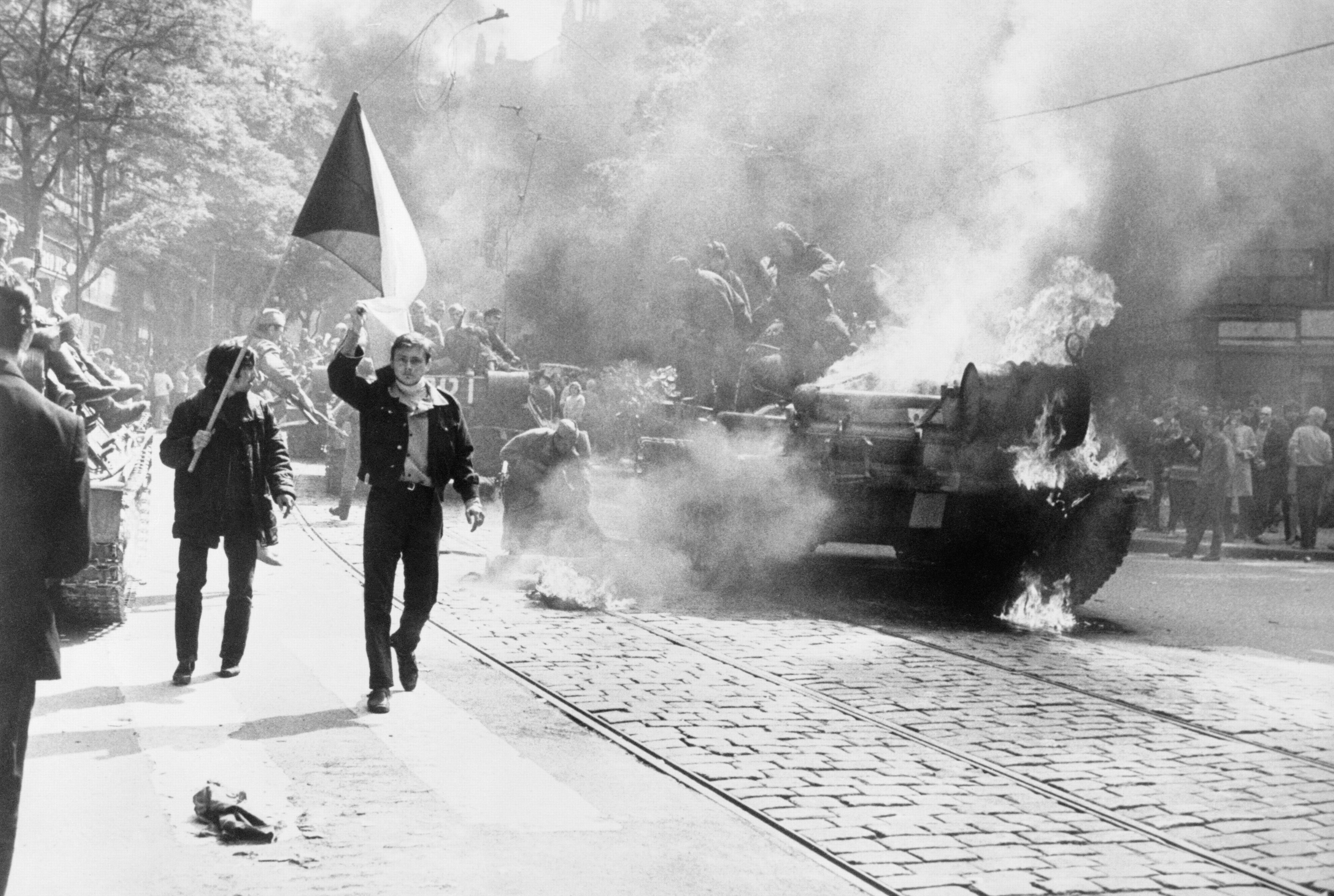
Destroyed Soviet tank during the Prague Spring in 1968.

Anti-communist insurgencies continued in both Central Europe and Eastern Europe during and after World War II. They were suppressed by the Soviet Union and its satellite states. Prominent movements include:

- The Ukrainian Insurgent Army fought a guerrilla war until they were defeated in 1956.
- Mirdita Tribesmen under Gjon Markagjoni sparked an uprising against the Hoxhaist regime in 1945, and were suppressed in 1950.
- The anti-Soviet Hungarian Revolution took place in 1956. Unlike the other movements given here, it was aimed against the domination of the Soviet Union, but not against the ideas of socialism and communism. Hungarian communists were among the leaders of the revolution, and Béla Király, who commanded the National Guard in the revolution, described it as being held by the working class and put emphasis on the revolutionary workers' councils.
- Baltic partisans known as the "Forest Brothers" fought until they were defeated in the mid 1950s.
- Romanian anti-communist resistance movement fought until they were defeated in 1962.
- Moldovan anti-soviet resistance groups including the "Black Army" fought until they were defeated in the Summer of 1950.
- Polish "cursed soldiers" fought a guerrilla war until they were defeated in the early 1950s.
- The Bulgarian "Goryani" fought until they were defeated in the mid 1950s.
- Croatian ultra-nationalist insurgents known as the "Crusaders" fought a guerrilla war until they were defeated in the early 1950s.
- The Chetniks fought until they were eradicated in the early 1950s.
- Belarusian Black Cats fought until they were defeated in 1946. Pockets of resistance continued into the early 1950s.
- In Russia, former members of the Kaminski Brigade, a collaborationist militia that was later reorganized into an SS unit, and supporters of the so-called "Lokot Autonomy" reorganized RONA as a partisan movement and fought until 1951.

== In Poland ==
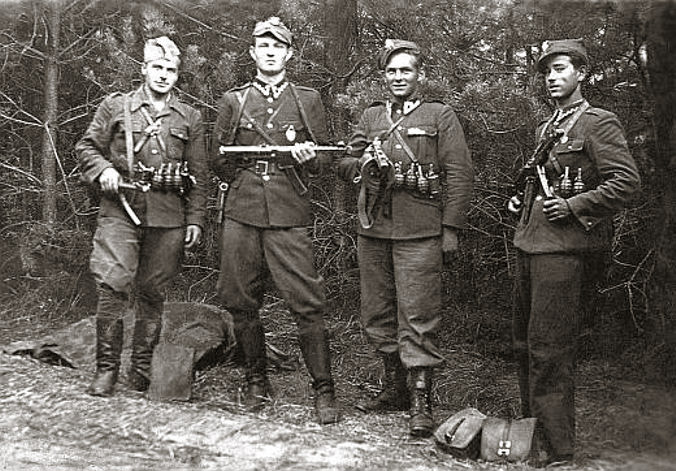
Polish 'cursed soldiers' of the anti-communist underground.

The "cursed soldiers" (Polish: Żołnierze wyklęci) is a name applied to a variety of Polish resistance movements that were formed in the later stages of World War II and afterward. Created by former members of the Polish underground resistance organizations of World War II, these organizations continued the struggle against the pro-Soviet government of Poland well into the 1950s. Their history and actions have been controversial, as they have been accused of anti-Semitism and mass murder.

Most of these anti-communist groups ceased operations in the late 1940s or 1950s. However, the last known "cursed soldier", Józef Franczak, was killed in an ambush as late as 1963, almost 20 years after the Soviet take-over of Poland.

== In the Baltic states ==
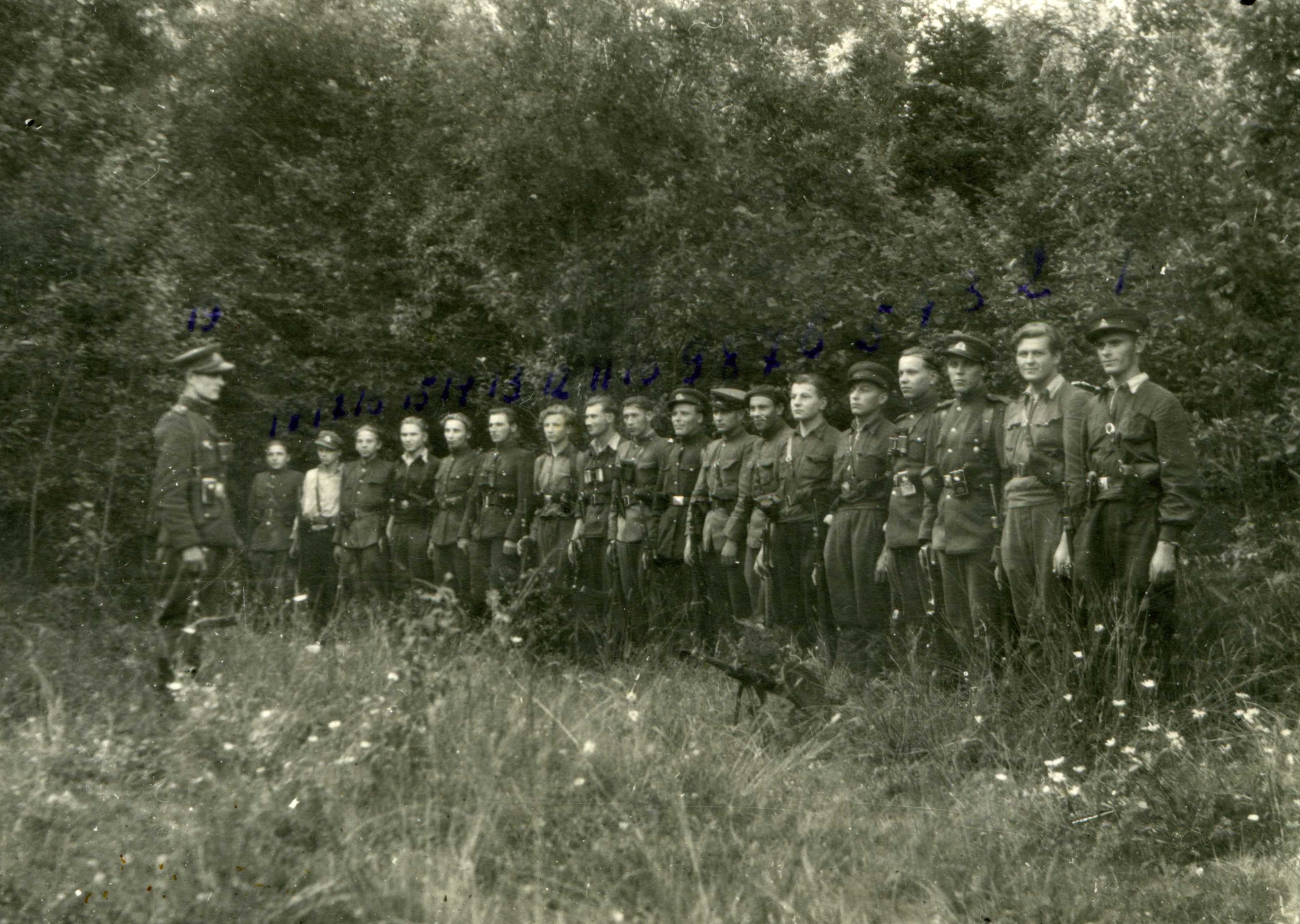
Lithuanian resistance fighters from the Dainava military district.

The Forest Brothers (also: Brothers of the Forest, Forest Brethren; Forest Brotherhood; Estonian: metsavennad, Latvian: meža brāļi, Lithuanian: miško broliai) were Estonian, Latvian, and Lithuanian partisans who waged guerrilla warfare against Soviet rule during the Soviet invasion and occupation of the three Baltic states during and after World War II. The Soviet Army occupied the independent Baltic states in 1940–1941 and, after a period of German occupation, again in 1944–1945. As Stalinist repression intensified over the following years, 50,000 residents of these countries used the heavily forested countryside as a natural refuge and base for armed anti-Soviet resistance.

Resistance units varied in size and composition, ranging from individually operating guerrillas, armed primarily for self-defense, to large and well-organized groups able to engage significant Soviet forces in battle.

== In Romania ==
An armed resistance movement against the communist government in Romania was active from the late 1940s to the mid-1950s, with isolated individual fighters remaining at large until the early 1960s. The groups were concentrated in the Carpathian Mountains, although a resistance movement had also developed in Northern Dobruja. Armed resistance was the most structured form of resistance against the Romanian government. After the overthrow of Nicolae Ceauşescu in 1989, the details about what was called “anti-communist armed resistance” were made public, thanks to the declassification of the Securitate archives.

== See also ==
- Western betrayal
- Werwolf
