= Petreni, Drochia =

Petreni
- Commune
- Location in Moldova
- Coordinates: 47°57′N 27°57′E
- Country: Moldova
- District: Drochia District

Population (2014)
  - Total: 1,002
- Time zone: UTC+2 (EET)
  - Summer (DST): UTC+3 (EEST)

Petreni is a commune in Drochia District, Moldova. It is composed of two villages, Petreni and Popeștii Noi. At the 2004 census, the commune had 1,179 inhabitants.

== History ==
Petreni is a renowned settlement of Cucuteni-Trypillian culture.

== Notable people ==
- Eugeniu Știrbu
