= Șuri =

- Commune
- Location within Moldova
- Country: Moldova
- District: Drochia District

Population (2014)
  - Total: 4,098
- Time zone: UTC+2 (EET)
  - Summer (DST): UTC+3 (EEST)

Șuri is a commune in Drochia District, Moldova. It is composed of two villages, Șuri and Șurii Noi. At the 2004 census, the commune had 4,614 inhabitants.
