= Popeștii de Jos =

- Village
- Location within Moldova
- Coordinates: 48.0786111111°N 28.0261111111°E
- Country: Moldova
- District: Drochia District

Government
  - Mayor: Ion Gusacinschi (PDM)

Population (2014 census)
  - Total: 1,764
- Time zone: UTC+2 (EET)
  - Summer (DST): UTC+3 (EEST)

Popeștii de Jos is a village in Drochia District, Moldova. At the 2004 census, the commune had 1,902 inhabitants.
