= Eugeniu Știrbu =

Moldovan politician (born 1945)

Eugeniu Știrbu OR

President of the Central Electoral Commission
- In office 11 November 2005 – 15 February 2011
- Preceded by: Eugeniu Clim
- Succeeded by: Iurie Ciocan

Member of the Chișinău Municipal Council
- In office 25 May 2003 – 10 July 2005

Member of the Moldovan Parliament
- In office 22 March 1998 – 25 February 2001
- Parliamentary group: For a Democratic and Prosperous Moldova Electoral Bloc

Personal details
- Born: 8 August 1945 (age 80) Petreni, Moldavian SSR, Soviet Union
- Party: Democratic Party of Moldova
- Children: 2

Eugeniu Știrbu (born 8 August 1945) is a politician from Moldova.

== Biography ==
Eugeniu Știrbu served as a member of the Parliament of Moldova (1998–2001). He was the General Secretary of Democratic Party of Moldova.

Eugeniu Știrbu has been the chairman of the Central Election Commission since November 11, 2005. On June 21, 2010, Știrbu was arrested as he was crossing the Kuchurgan checkpoint on his way from Odesa Airport to Chișinău, after a flight to Poland, where he had observed the presidential poll. Taken to Tiraspol, Știrbu learned that the separatist authorities had initiated criminal proceedings against him in 2007 for organizing elections in the much-disputed village of Corjova, Dubăsari. Later that day, the release was possible due to the intervention of Ambassador Philip Remler, the head of the OSCE Mission to Moldova.

=== Professional experience ===
- 2012–present – The head of the Chisinau office of International Institute for monitoring democratic and parliamentary process and suffrage protection in the CIS (IIMDP).
- September 2009 – June 2010 – the president of the Association of European Election Officials (ACEEEO)
- 2005–2011 – the chairman of the Central Election Commission of the Republic of Moldova.
- 2003–2005 – the councillor of Chisinau City Council
- 1998–2001 – the deputy of the Parliament of the Republic of Moldova
- 1998–2001 – Vice president of the Parliamentary Commission for Youth, Sport and Tourism
- 1997–1998 – The Head of Government's Section of Human Resources Policy
- 1996–1997 – Deputy Director of the joint-stock company "Moldova- Tur"
- 1994–1996 – Deputy Director of National Relations Department of Government of the Republic of Moldova
- 1991-1994 – President of National Association of Charity "Sanitas"
- 1990–1991 – legal counsel of the President of Football Club "Nistru"
- 1986–1990 – Vice- president of the State Committee for physical culture and sport
- 1983–1986 – President of the Republican Council of the Association of Athletes' Villages "Colhoznic", Chisinau
- 1977–1982 – Section of propaganda and agitation of City district party committee, Cutuzov
- 1977–1982 – member of district Soviet of Cutuzov
- 1972–1976 – member of City Soviet of Anenii Noi
- 1972–1977 – chief, organizational section, District Committee of Komsomol, Anenii Noi
- 1970–1971 – the head teacher of sport school for children, Anenii Noi
