= Drochia District =

Coordinates: 48°05′N 27°50′E

Drochia
- District (Raion)
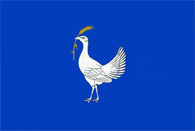
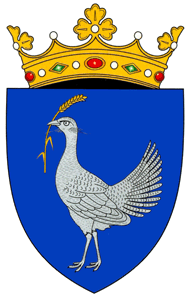
- Flag Coat of arms

- Country: Republic of Moldova
- Administrative center (Oraş-reşedinţă): Drochia
- Established: 2003

Government
  - Raion President: Vasile Cemortan (2023) (PAS)

Area
  - Total: 999.9 km^{2} (386.1 sq mi)

Population (2024)
  - Total: 53,738
  - Density: 53.74/km^{2} (139.2/sq mi)
- Time zone: UTC+2 (EET)
  - Summer (DST): UTC+3 (EEST)
- Area code: +373 52
- Car plates: DR
- Website: www.drochia.md

Drochia district (Romanian pronunciation: [ˈdroki.a]) is a district in the north of Moldova. Its administrative center is the city of Drochia. As of the 2024 Moldovan census, the population was 53,738.

== History ==
The oldest historical attestations about the settlements in the district from the period 1443 to 1470 when the mentioned villages Cotova, Hasnasenii Mari, Mindic. In the next century of growth followed both economic, cultural and demographic explosion, shown by the fact that 11 villages in the district had 3,000 inhabitants. After the Treaty of Bucharest in 1812, Bessarabia as Drochia district are occupied by the Russian Empire at this time there is a massive colonization by Ukrainians and Russians. In 1918 after the collapse of the Russian Empire, Bessarabia united with the motherland Romania. And in 1940, Bessarabia is again occupied by the USSR on the Molotov–Ribbentrop Treaty. After the 2004 census the population was 94.500 inhabitants of the district.

== Geography ==
Drochia district is located in the north of Moldova, has Donduseni District neighborhood in north, east Florești and Soroca district, south Singerei District and Riscani District in the southwest. In the northern district they learn remains of Plateau Moldova, while most of the district is located in Balti Steppe. The relief is poorly fractured, weak erogenous processes. Chernozems occupy about 80% of the district.

=== Climate ===
District climate is temperate, with shades continental. Average annual temperature is 9.5 °C (49 °F), average temperature in July is 21 °C (70 °F), while in January −5 °C (23 °F). Annual precipitation varies from 600 to 650 mm years reaching rainy, while 300–350 mm in dry years. Average wind speed is 3–6 m \ s.

=== Fauna ===
Fauna is characterized by the presence of such mammals such as fox, ferret, wild boar, deer, fallow deer, rabbit, weasel, and hedgehog; and in water bodies: muskrat and otter. For birds, there are: stork, crow, partridge, swallow, egret and swan. In the past the Balti steppe was populated by bustards. Now they have disappeared or are in a tiny number. The emblem of Drochia District is a bustard, from which comes the name of the district.

=== Flora ===
Forests occupy 8.1% of the district's area and are characterized by: hornbeam, oak, beech, lime, chestnut, ash and others. Plants, mainly steppe features are: fescue, clover, wormwood, burdock, knotweed and other plants.

=== Rivers ===
Drochia district is located in the Raut river basin (the largest tributary of the Nistru River), which has a length of 286 km, crossing tributaries of the district are along Raut, Cubolta (101 km) and Cainari (86 km). Most lakes in the district have artificial origin.

== Administrative subdivisions ==
There are a total of 40 localities: 1 city, and 27 communes (containing further 12 villages within):

=== Cities ===
Drochia (population 20,400)

=== Communes ===
Antoneuca (Antoneni; pop. 479) Baroncea (pop. 1,609) Baroncea Nouă Chetrosu (pop. 5,325) Cotova (pop. 3,569) Măcăreuca Dominteni (pop. 1,402) Drochia (Drochia sat; pop. 2,843) Fîntîniţa (Ghizdita; pop. 1,405) Ghizdita, loc.st.c.f. Gribova (Năduşita, Năduşiţa; pop. 2,175) Hăsnăşenii Mari (pop. 1,884) Hăsnăşenii Noi (pop. 1,736) Lazo (Cuza-Vodă) Maramonovca (Moara Nouă; pop. 2,666) Miciurin (Ghica-Vodă; pop. 1,608) Mîndîc (pop. 3,402) Moara de Piatră (pop. 1,659) Nicoreni (Nicoreşti; pop. 3,420) Ochiul Alb (pop. 3,089)	Palanca (pop. 901) Holoşniţa Nouă Şalvirii Noi Pelinia (pop. 7,538) Pelinia, loc.st.c.f Pervomaiscoe (Căetăneşti; pop. 897) Sergheuca (Serghieşti) Petreni (pop. 1,179) Popeştii Noi Popeştii de Jos (pop. 1,902) Popeştii de Sus (pop. 1,784) Sofia (pop. 4,823) Şalvirii Vechi (pop. 1,082) Ceapaevca Iliciovca Şuri (pop. 4,614) Şurii Noi Ţarigrad (pop. 4,655) Zguriţa (pop. 2,840)

== Demographics ==
As of the 2024 Census, the district population was 53,738 of which 24.1% urban and 75.9% rural population.

=== Ethnic groups ===
Ethnic group	% of total
Moldovans *	88.9
Ukrainians	5.8
Romanians *	3.3
Russians	1.2
Romani	0.6
Gagauz	0.1
Other	0.2
Undeclared	0.0

Footnote: * There is an ongoing controversy regarding the ethnic identification of Moldovans and Romanians.

=== Religion ===
- Christian – 99.4%
  - Orthodox Christian – 97.1%
  - Protestant – 2.3%
- Other – 0.1%
- No Religion – 0.3%
- Not Declared - 0.2%

== Economy ==
As of 2009, 13,767 businesses were registered in the district. 11,168 these were private farms, 1,585 individual businesses, 492 limited liability companies, 28 joint stock companies, 13 state-owned enterprises, 257 "public ventures", and 224 other types.

== Education ==
As of 2009, there were 41 kindergartens in the district, with 3,827 kids. There were 12 lyceums (grades 1–12), 9 secondary schools (grades 1–11), 15 gymnasiums (grades 1–9), 3 primary schools (grades 1–4), a boarding school for students with disabilities, and an auxiliary school.

== Politics ==
Located in the so-called North Red electoral region (the region where PCRM obtained favorable results over 50% of votes), district in 2001–2009 was mainly communist district. But after the 2010 elections the communists lose to the AEI.

During the last three elections AEI had an increase of 68.0%

Parliament elections results
Year	AEI	PCRM
2010	48.58% 19,623	44.57% 15,043
July 2009	46.20% 18,047	49.69% 19,406
April 2009	30.36% 11,678	56.91% 21,895

=== Elections ===
Summary of 28 November 2010 Parliament of Moldova election results in Drochia District
Parties and coalitions	Votes	%	+/−
Party of Communists of the Republic of Moldova	18,003	44.57	−5.12
Liberal Democratic Party of Moldova	11,400	28.22	+12.0
Democratic Party of Moldova	5,583	13,82	-2.46
Liberal Party	1,700	4.21	−4.36
Party Alliance Our Moldova	940	2.33	−2.80
Humanist Party of Moldova	489	1.21	+1.21
Other Party	2295	5.64	+1.53
Total (turnout 59.01%)	40,697	100.00	

== Culture ==
There are 33 public libraries and 5 museums in Drochia district. There are also 115 art groups.

== Personalities ==
- Ion Buga – Politician, member of the Moldovan Parliament 1990–1994, former president of the party New Historical Option
- Ion Costaș – Minister of Internal Affairs of Moldova in 1990–1992
- Nicolae Filip – Specialist in physics, geometry ultrashort radio wave propagation, and honorary member of the Academy of Sciences of Moldova.
- Nicolae Testemițanu – Scientist, surgeon, hygienist and politician
