= Drochia, Drochia =

Drochia
- Village
- Location within Moldova
- Coordinates: 48.1138888889°N 27.8080555556°E
- Country: Moldova
- District: Drochia District

Government
  - Mayor: Dumitru Marcu (PDM)

Population (2014 census)
  - Total: 2,621
- Time zone: UTC+2 (EET)
  - Summer (DST): UTC+3 (EEST)

Drochia is a village in Drochia District, in the north of Moldova. At the 2004 census, it had a population of 2,843.

At the 1930 census, the locality had a population of 2,269. It was part of Plasa Climăuți of Soroca County.

Ethnic composition
Ethnic group	1930 census	2004 census
Moldovans	N/A	2,791
Romanians	2,174	1
Jews	56	-
Gypsies	5	33
Russians	29	8
Ruthenians (Ukrainians)	-	7
Poles	5	-
Gagauzians	-	1
others	-	2
Total	2,269	2,843

Native language
Language	1930 census	2004 census
Romanian	2,180	N/A
Yiddish	56	N/A
Russian	33	N/A
Ukrainian	-	N/A
other	-	N/A
Total	2,269	2,843
