= Chetrosu, Drochia =

Chetrosu
- Village
- Location within Moldova
- Coordinates: 48.0697222222°N 27.9016666667°E
- Country: Moldova
- District: Drochia

Government
  - Mayor: Ion Prodan (PDM)

Population (2014 census)
  - Total: 4,777
- Time zone: UTC+2 (EET)
  - Summer (DST): UTC+3 (EEST)

Chetrosu is a village in Drochia District, Moldova. At the 2004 census, the commune had 5,325 inhabitants.
