= Hăsnășenii Mari =

- Village
- Location within Moldova
- Coordinates: 47.9136111111°N 27.9908333333°E
- Country: Moldova
- District: Drochia District

Government
  - Mayor: Valeriu Varmari (PLDM)

Population (2014 census)
  - Total: 1,531
- Time zone: UTC+2 (EET)
  - Summer (DST): UTC+3 (EEST)

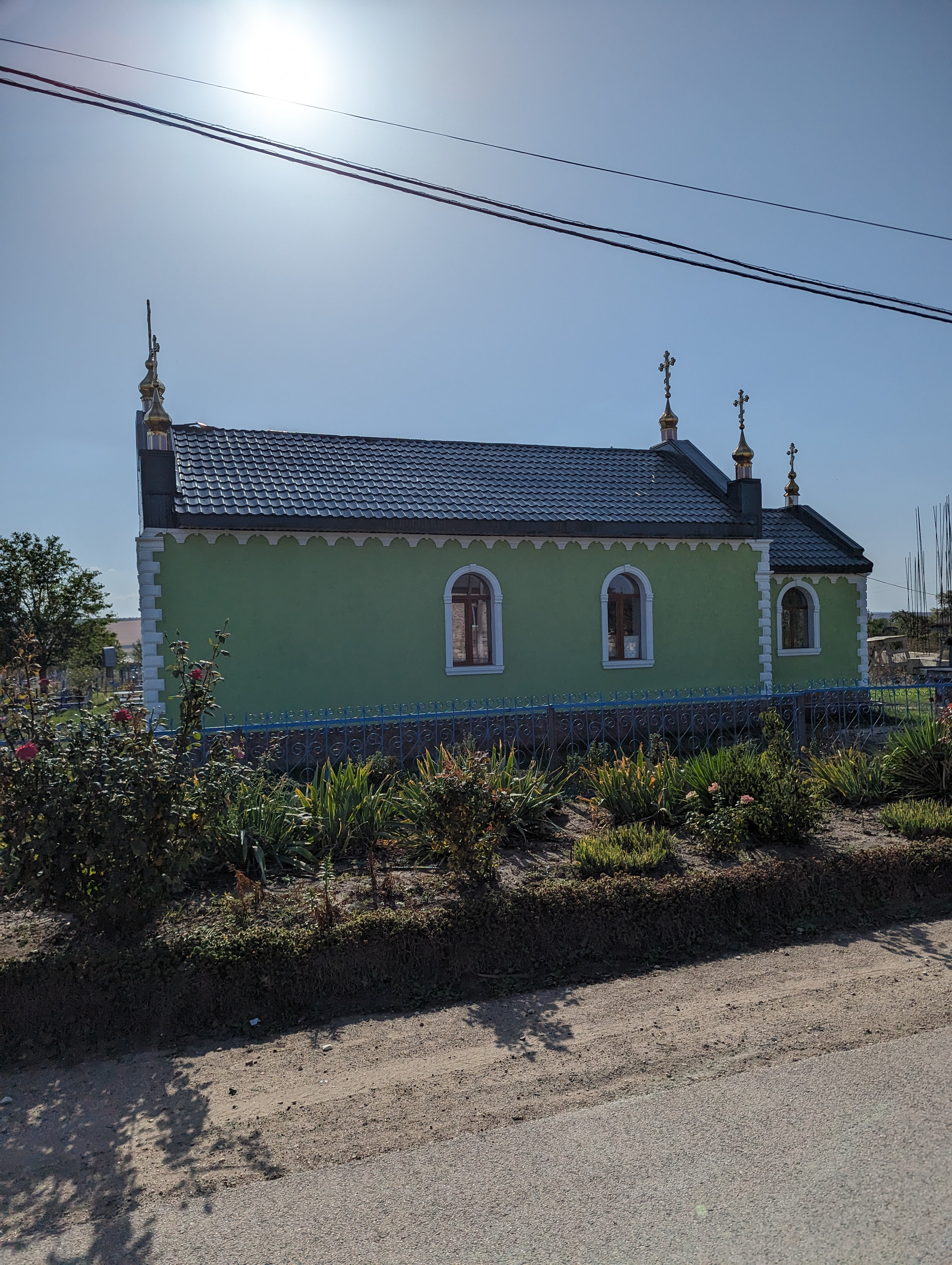
Hăsnăşenii Church, 2023

Hăsnășenii Mari is a village in Drochia District, Moldova. At the 2004 census, the commune had 1,884 inhabitants.
