= Hăsnășenii Noi =

- Commune
- Location within Moldova
- Coordinates: 47.8555555556°N 27.9066666667°E
- Country: Moldova
- District: Drochia District

Population (2014)
  - Total: 1,620
- Time zone: UTC+2 (EET)
  - Summer (DST): UTC+3 (EEST)

Hăsnășenii Noi is a commune in Drochia District, Moldova. It is composed of two villages, Hăsnăşenii Noi and Lazo (formerly Cuza-Vodă). At the 2004 census, the commune had 1,736 inhabitants.
