= Victor Zâmbrea =

Romanian activist and painter

- Born: 1924; Reni, Ismail County, Kingdom of Romania
- Died: 2000 (aged 75–76); Chișinău, Moldova

Victor Zâmbrea (1924 – 2000) was a Bessarabian painter.

== Early years ==
Zâmbrea was born in 1924 in Reni, Ismail County, Bessarabia, Kingdom of Romania. In 1936, he finished the Gymnasium (Junior High School) in his native town, and graduated from the Evening Lyceum (High School) in Bucharest in 1940. In 1941, he enrolled in the School of Fine Arts, Bucharest. In 1963, he graduated from the University of Popular Art in Moscow. He was a member of the Union of Plastic Artists of the Moldovan SSR.

In 1942, he voluntarily enrolled in the Romanian Royal Navy's School of Scuba diving in Constanța.

== Anti-communist activity ==
In November 1944, he was arrested by the Soviet NKVD, and sent to an NKVD filtration point in Chişinău. Released in June 1945, he went to Izmail, where he joined the anti-Soviet resistance group "Vocea Basarabiei" (English: The Voice of Bessarabia). In May 1948, he was arrested for Romanian propaganda activity. He succeeded to escape from his prison, and changed his name to Dumbrovschi.

Zâmbrea then established himself in Chișinău, and made contacts with an anti-Soviet resistance group in the city. In the evening of 6 July 1949 he was arrested within the course of Operation Yug of mass deportation of ca. 40,000 civilians of the Moldovan SSR to Siberia and northern Kazakhstan. Soon afterwards, interrogation and investigation of his identity started. He was accused in virtue of Article 58 of the Russian SFSR (on the grounds that the investigation was being carried in Russia, not in Moldova) of "anti-Soviet propaganda, and [being a] traitor of the Soviet people". The March 1953 amnesty decree after the death of Joseph Stalin saved him from capital punishment by execution squad. A year later he obtained a transfer to the city of Tyumen to work under guard as painter in the Railroad Club.

== Post-detention years ==
Following his release in 1958, he settled in Chișinău, where he worked as a painter in the University Central Store. Until his retirement in 1984, he also worked as a painter for the Fund of Plastic Arts in Chișinău. Since 1954, his works have participated in various expositions.

In 1994, Zâmbrea opened a personal exposition "Bessarabian Romanians deported to Siberia" in Chișinău. His works are found in private and public collections in Paris, Bucharest, Moscow, Kyiv, Tel Aviv, Jerusalem, Buenos Aires, Montreal, Riga, Vilnius, Timișoara, Brașov, Odesa, Mykolaiv, Tumen, Novokuznetsk, Esentuki, and Sighetu Marmației.

He died in 2000 in Chișinău.

== See also ==
- Sighet Memorial of the Victims of Communism
- Soviet deportations from Bessarabia and Northern Bukovina
