= Cornova =

- Comună
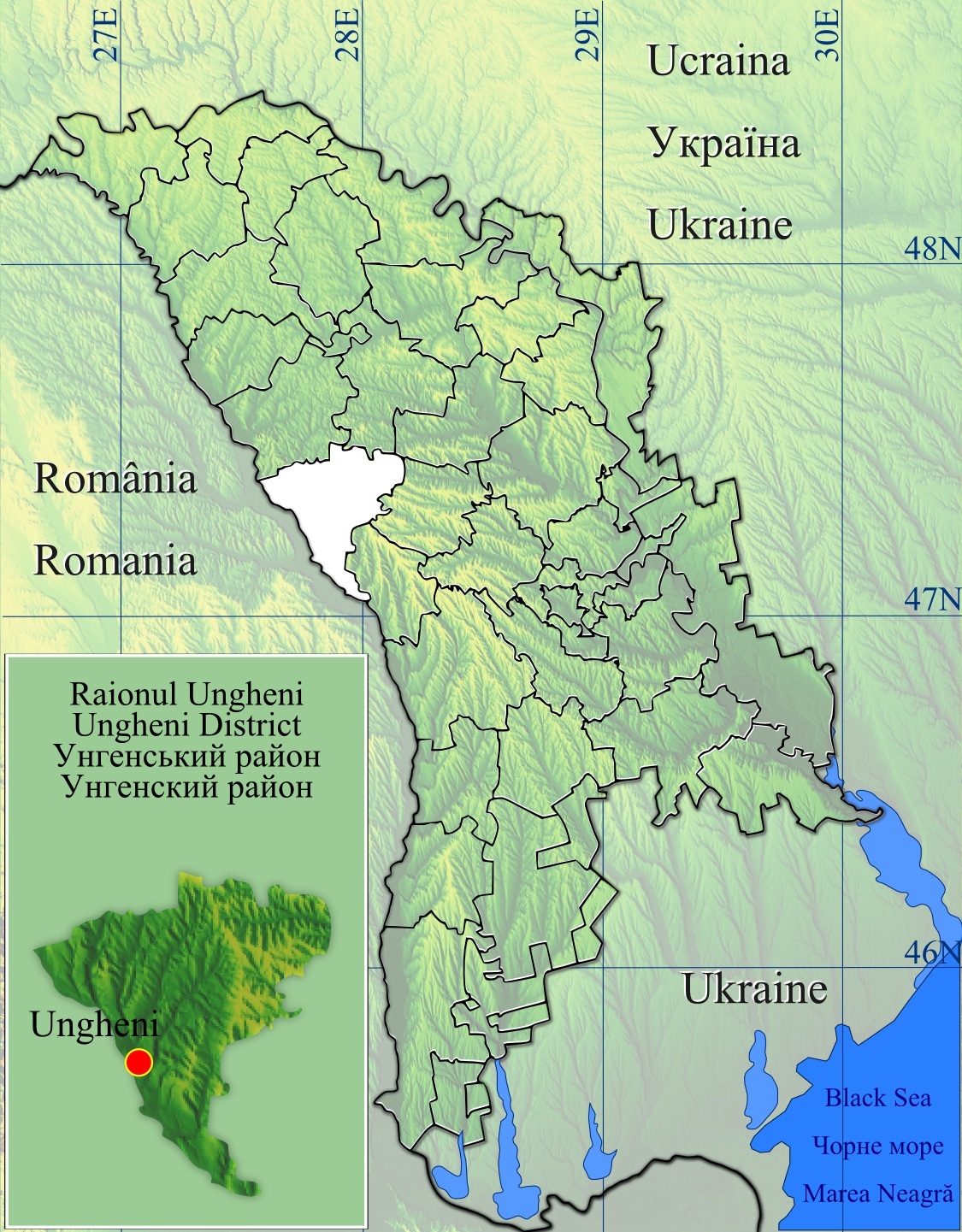
- Location within Ungheni
- Coordinates: 47°23′36″N 28°10′24″E
- Country: Moldova

Government
  - Mayor: Ștefan Roșca (PLDM)

Population (2014 census)
  - Total: 968
- Time zone: UTC+2 (EET)
  - Summer (DST): UTC+3 (EEST)
- Postal code: MD-3622

Cornova is a village in Ungheni District, Moldova.
