= Mîndîc =

Mândâc
- Village
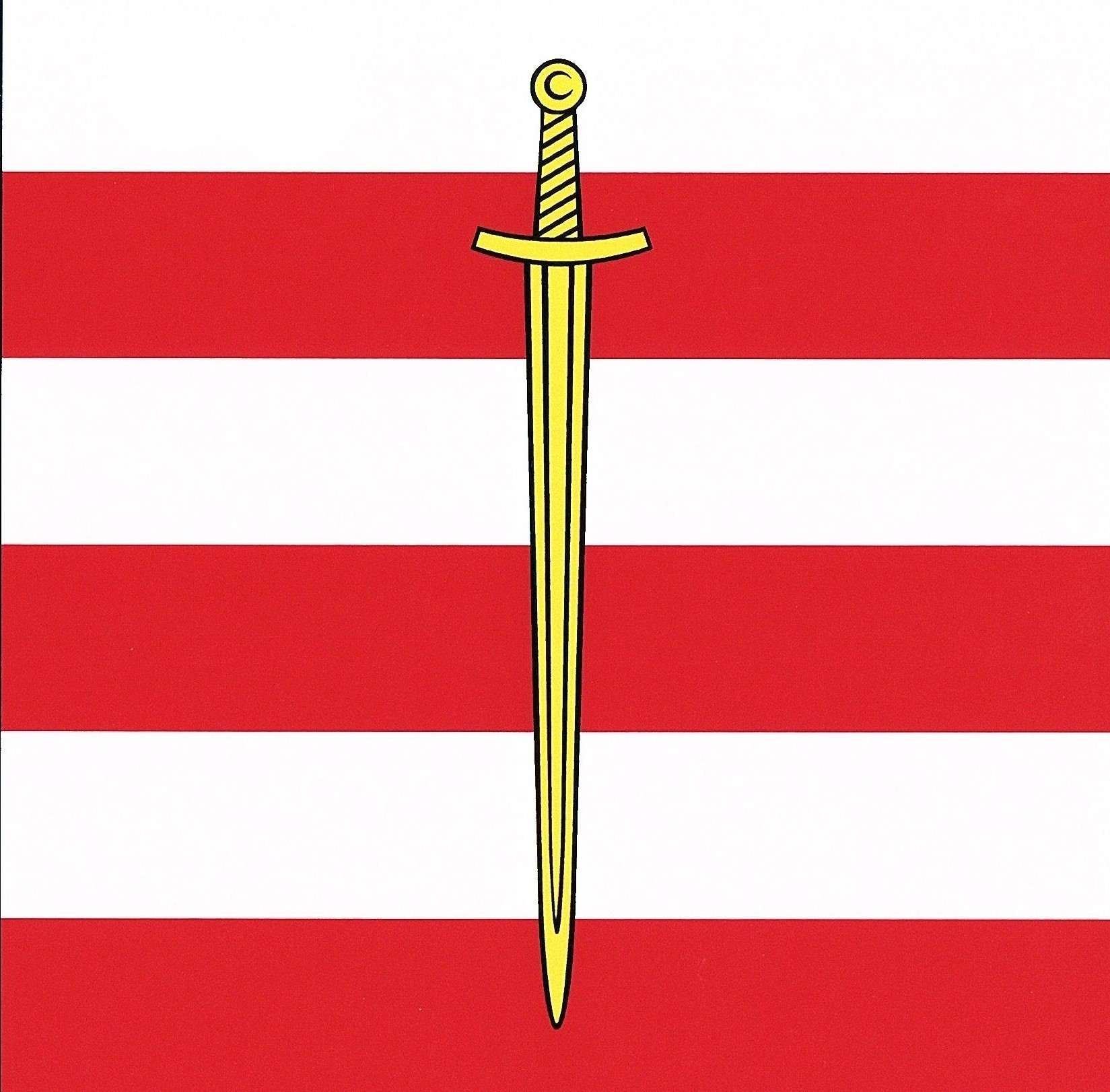
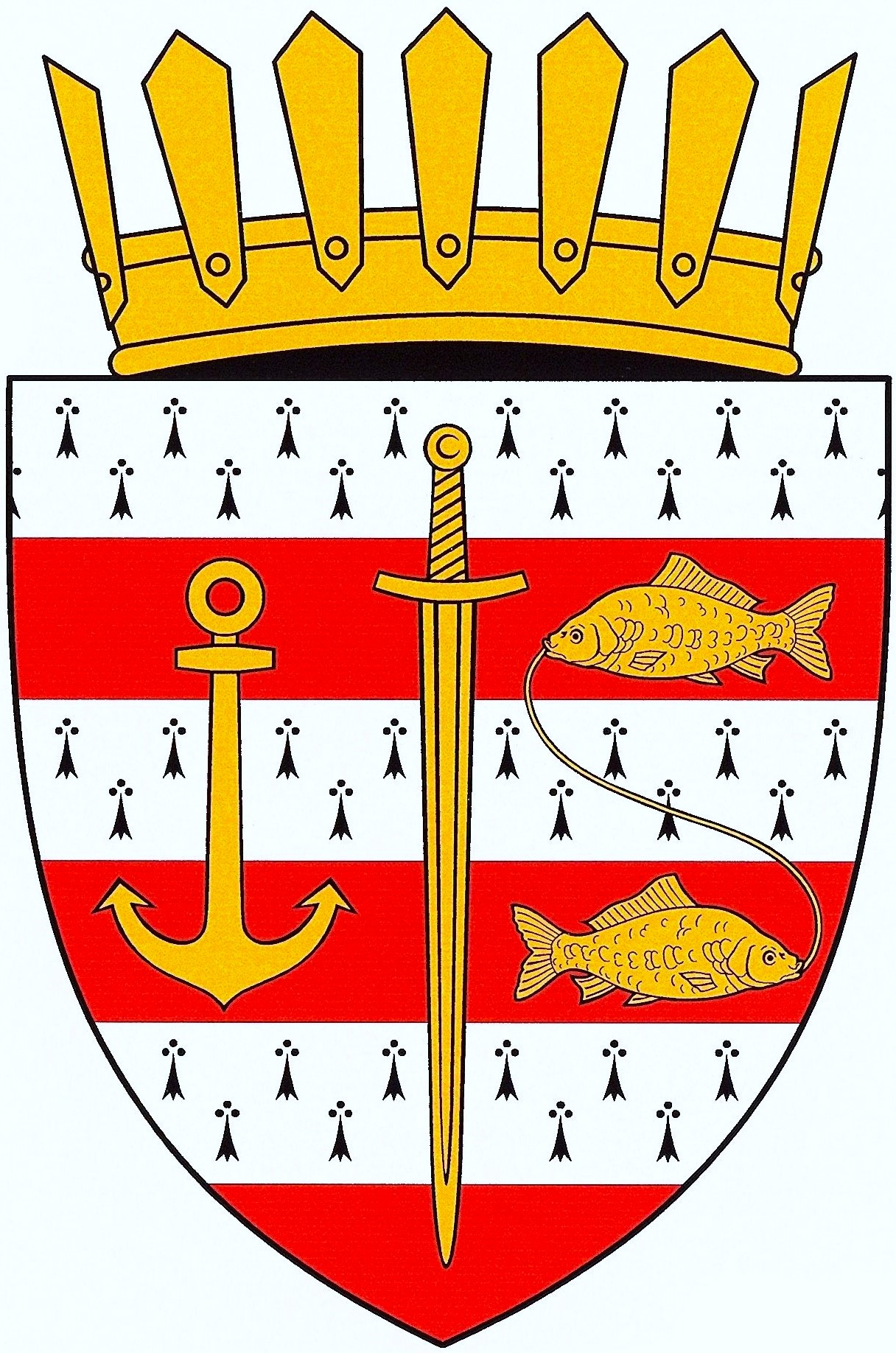
- Flag Coat of arms

- Location in Moldova
- Coordinates: 48°09′N 27°48′E
- Country: Moldova
- District: Drochia District

Population (2014 census)
  - Total: 2,882
- Time zone: UTC+2 (EET)
  - Summer (DST): UTC+3 (EEST)

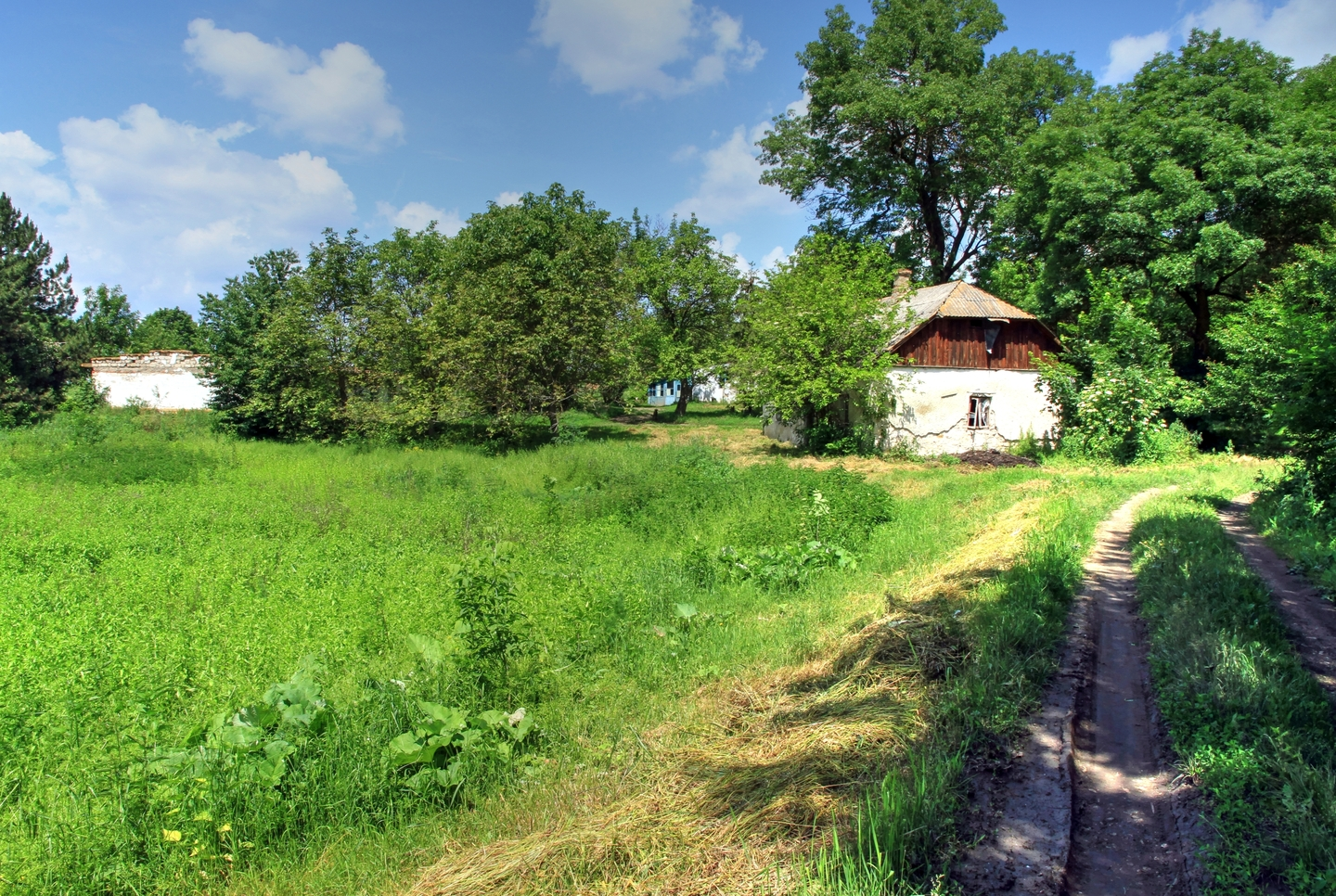

Mîndîc, also spelled Mândâc, is a village in Drochia District, Moldova. At the 2004 census, the commune had 3,402 inhabitants.

== Notable people ==
- Ion Moraru
- Dorin Recean
