= Iurie Ciocan =

Moldovan politician and professor (born 1971)

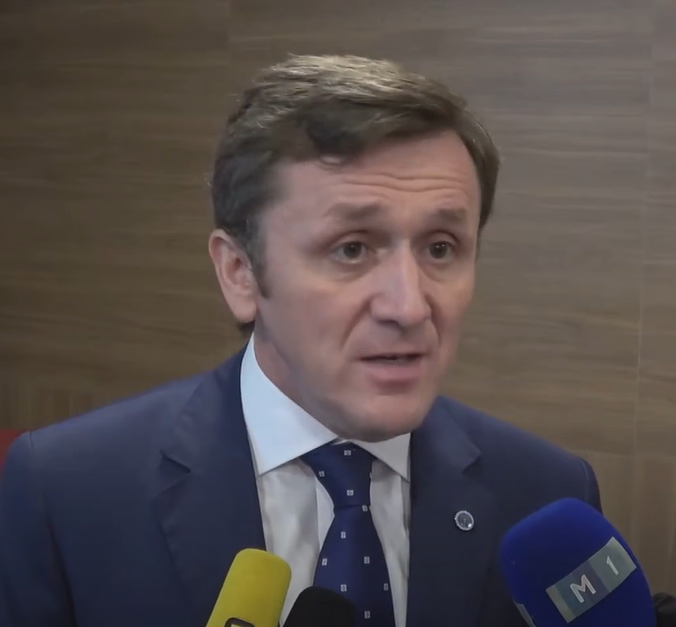
- Ciocan in 2016

President of the Central Electoral Commission
- In office 15 February 2011 – 27 June 2016
- Preceded by: Eugeniu Știrbu
- Succeeded by: Alina Russu

Personal details
- Born: 19 May 1971 (age 55) Chişinău, Moldavian SSR, Soviet Union
- Party: PSD
- Other political affiliations: European Social Democratic Party
- Education: Technical University of Moldova

Iurie Ciocan (born 19 May 1971) is a politician and professor from the Republic of Moldova. He served as President of the Central Election Commission of Moldova from February 2011 to June 2016.

== Biography ==
Iurie Ciocan was born on 19 May 1971 in Chişinău, the Republic of Moldova. In 1994, he graduated from the Technical University of Moldova. Between 1997 and 1999, he followed post-graduate studies at the Public Administration Academy under the President of the Republic of Moldova, qualification – referent in international organizations. From 1999 – professor at the PAA under the President of the Republic of Moldova. In 2007 PhD in Political Science.

Iurie Ciocan has more than 8 years experience in election administration and observation. He is the Chairman of the Central Election Commission of Moldova since 15 February 2011. Iurie Ciocan has been administrating 2005, April 2009, July 2009 and November 2010 Moldovan parliamentary elections, as well as republican constitutional referendum, of September 2010, local election of June 2007 and local election of June 2011.

In the autumn of 2014, as CEC chairman, Iurie Ciocan took over the presidency of the Association of European Election Officials (ACEEEO) for the period 2014–2015.

Iurie Ciocan is fully accredited electoral expert BRIDGE. He holds the Ph.D in Political Science and Honorary Doctor Honoris Causa of the International Academy of Computerization at the UN (RM Section).

== Family ==
He is married to Nona Marian (born 18 February 1977), a singer from the Republic of Moldova. They have two girls - Sofia and Domnița.
