= Lidia Istrati =

Moldovan writer and politician

Lidia Istrati OR
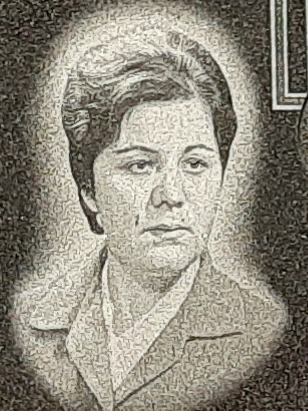
- Born: 22 June 1941; Sofia, Drochia
- Died: 25 April 1997 (aged 55)
- Education: Moldova State University
- Spouse: Vasile
- Awards: Order of Work Merit

Lidia Istrati (22 June 1941 – 25 April 1997) was a writer and politician from Moldova. She was born to Nicolae and Xenia and had a PhD in biology.

Lidia Istrati served as member of the Parliament of Moldova (1990 – 1997) and was the chairwoman of the Christian Democratic League of Women of Moldova(1993–1997) (Romanian: Liga Creștin-Democrată a Femeilor din Moldova).

== Biography ==
She studied at the Agricultural Institute of Chișinău (currently the Agricultural State University of Moldova), which she graduated in 1962. He continues his studies, she did the doctorate at the Academy of Sciences of the Republic of Moldova. In 1971, she obtained her PhD in Biology. After graduating from the institute, he worked as a teacher in the village of Bujor, Hîncești district, then editor and head of editorial office at "Ştiinţa" Publishing House, director of the Republican Literary Museum "D. Cantemir ".

== Activity ==
She was a member of the Parliament of the Republic of Moldova in 1990–1997 (1990–1994 and 1994–1998 legislatures), on the lists of the Electoral Bloc "Alliance of the Christian Democratic Popular Front". Since 1994, she represents the Peasants and Intellectuals Bloc. He signed the Declaration of Independence of the Republic of Moldova in 1991. She was described by some colleagues as a fierce warrior against corruption and mafia.

== Awards ==
- Lidia Istrati received the Order of Work Glory from Mircea Snegur in 1996.
- In 2017, a commemorative plaque was installed on the facade of the house where he lived.

== Works ==
- “Tot mai departe”
- “Scara”,
- “Goană după vânt”,
- “Nevinovata inimă”

== Family ==
The writer was married to agronomist Vasile Istrati. The couple had a daughter, Lucia. Lidia Istrati died in 1997, being slain by cancer.
