= Condrătești =

- Commune
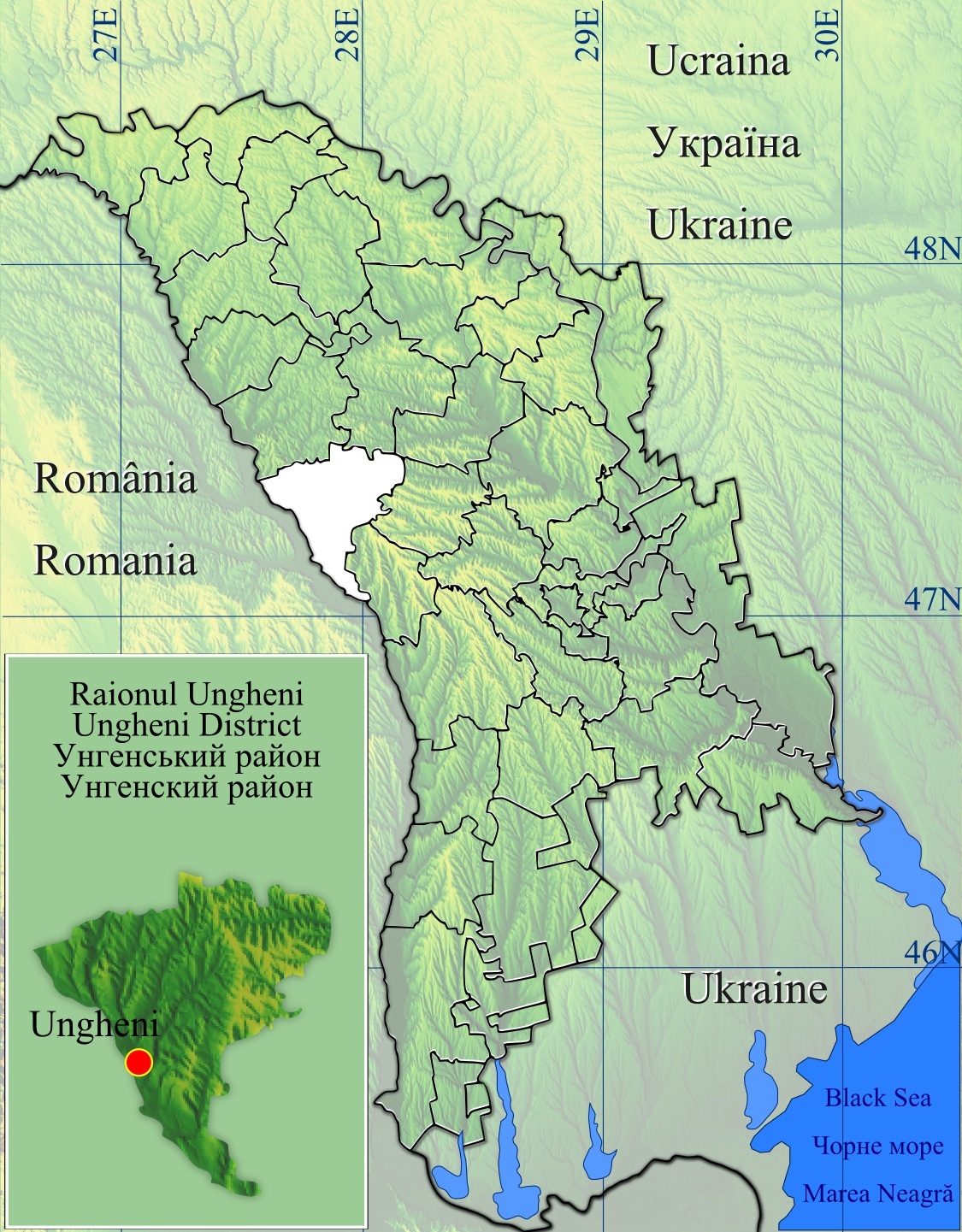
- Location within Ungheni
- Coordinates: 47°24′57″N 28°6′36″E
- Country: Moldova

Government
  - Mayor: Bodrug Ion

Population (2014)
  - Total: 1,098
- Time zone: UTC+2 (EET)
  - Summer (DST): UTC+3 (EEST)
- Postal code: MD-3620

Condrătești is a commune in Ungheni District, Moldova. It is composed of two villages, Condrătești and Curtoaia.

== Notable people ==
- Teodor Zgureanu, composer (1939–2024)
