= Philip Remler =

American diplomat

Philip N. Remler
- Known for: Head Organization for Security and Co-operation in Europe Mission to Moldova

Philip N. Remler is the former Head of the Organization for Security and Co-operation in Europe (OSCE) Mission to Moldova.

== Biography ==
Philip N. Remler served as Head of the OSCE Mission to Moldova from December 2007 to January 2012, after a career as a Foreign Service Officer with the United States Department of State. Prior to his appointment to the OSCE, he served as Senior Advisor to the U.S. Ambassador in Moscow.

Remler joined the United States Department of State in 1983. Earlier in his career he served in Turkey, the USSR and Azerbaijan. Other postings include positions in the State Department and the National Security Council on Iraq and at the U.S. Embassy to Georgia. He worked closely with the OSCE Minsk Group on resolving the Nagorno-Karabakh conflict when he served as Deputy Head of the State Department Office of the Special Negotiator for Regional Conflicts.
