= Vocea Basarabiei (anti-Soviet group) =

- Formation: 1945
- Dissolved: 1948
- Type: Anti-Soviet group
- Location: Bessarabia
- Official language: Romanian

Vocea Basarabiei (English: The Voice of Bessarabia) was one of the organized anti-Soviet groups in Bessarabia.

== Notable members ==
- Victor Zâmbrea

== Bibliography ==
- Mitru Ghiţiu, Unele aspecte din mişcarea de rezistenţă antisovietică în Basarabia postbelică, Analele Sighet 2, Instaurarea comunismului - între rezistenţă şi represiune, Fundaţia Academia Civică, 1995
- Elena Postică, Rezistena antisovietică în Basarabia.1944-1950, Chişinău, 1997,
- Valeriu Pasat, Trudnâe straniţî istorii Moldovî. 1940-1950 [Documente] (Pages difficiles d'histoire de la Moldavie), Moscova, Ed. Terra, 1994,
