= Prodănești, Florești =

Prodănești
- Commune
- Location within Moldova
- Coordinates: 47.7436111111°N 28.4808333333°E
- Country: Moldova
- District: Florești District

Population (2014)
  - Total: 1,802
- Time zone: UTC+2 (EET)
  - Summer (DST): UTC+3 (EEST)

Prodănești is a commune in Floreşti District, Moldova. It is composed of two villages, Căprești and Prodănești.
