= Ion Moraru =

Moldovan activist and author (1929–2019)

Ion Moraru OR
- Born: 9 March 1929; Mîndîc
- Died: 9 October 2019 (aged 90); Bălți
- Other name: Mos Ion de la Mândâc
- Known for: Sabia Dreptății founder

Ion Moraru (9 March 1929 – 9 October 2019) was a Moldovan activist and author. He was a founder of the anti-Soviet group Sabia Dreptății and a political prisoner in the Soviet Union.

== Biography ==
Moraru was born in Mîndîc. Ion Moraru and Petre Lungu were the founders of Sabia Dreptății in Bălți. This anti-Soviet armed resistance group was active in Bălți during the Stalinist era. "Sabia Dreptății" was discovered by the NKVD in 1947, based at the Pedagogical Lycée (former Ion Creangă Lycée) in Bălţi. For one year, Ion Moraru was imprisoned in the same camp at Ekibastuz as Aleksandr Solzhenitsyn.

Ion Moraru later became a well-known anti-communist in Bessarabia (now the Republic of Moldova).

He was a member of the Christian-Democratic People's Party.

== Works ==
- Pustiirea, 2005
- Treptele infernului, 2007

== Bibliography ==
- Elena Postică, "Sabia dreptăţii", în Ţara, 1995, 19, 26 ianuarie
