= Vasile Bătrânac =

Moldovan educator and Soviet dissident (born 1925)

- Born: 1925; Plopi, Kingdom of Romania (now Moldova)
- Other names: Vasile Plopeanu
- Occupation: teacher
- Known for: Arcașii lui Ștefan founder
- Parent: Ion Bătrânac

Vasile Bătrânac (born 1925) is a Moldovan former educator and early Soviet dissident who was the head of the Arcașii lui Ștefan group in the Moldavian Soviet Socialist Republic shortly after World War II.

== Biography ==
Vasile Bătrânac was born in 1925 in what is now western Moldova. His father was Ion Bătrânac. In 1944, he was arrested for the first time for anti-Soviet activity. Following World War II, Bătrânac founded Arcașii lui Ștefan in Soroca in 1945, along with fellow teachers Victor Solovei, Nicolae Prăjină, Teodosie Guzun, Anton Romaşcan, and a student, Nichita Brumă. Bătrânac was the head of the organization. Vasile Plopeanu is a conspirative name that Bătrânac used while he was the head of the organization.

In March 1947, the organization had 140 members. On 23 March 1947, Bătrânac and co-leader Vasile Cvasniuc were arrested. On 11 June 1947, he was sentenced to 25 years and sent to Siberia.

== Gallery ==
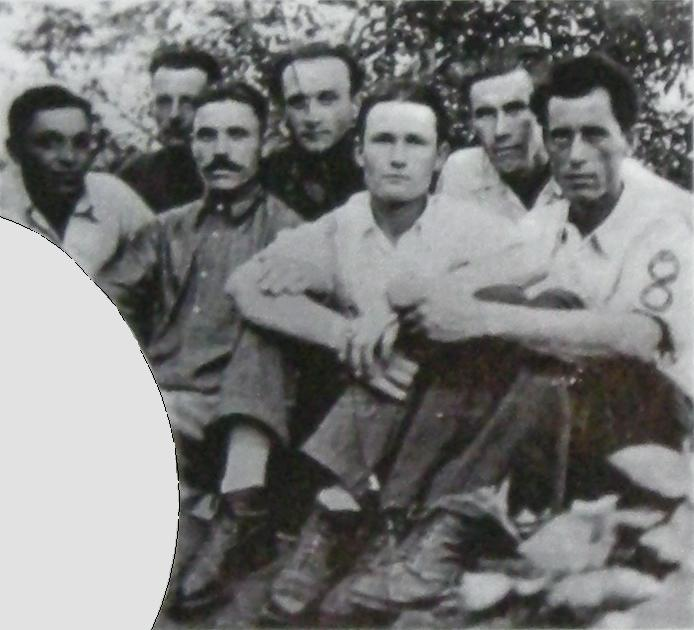
Arcaşii lui Ştefan

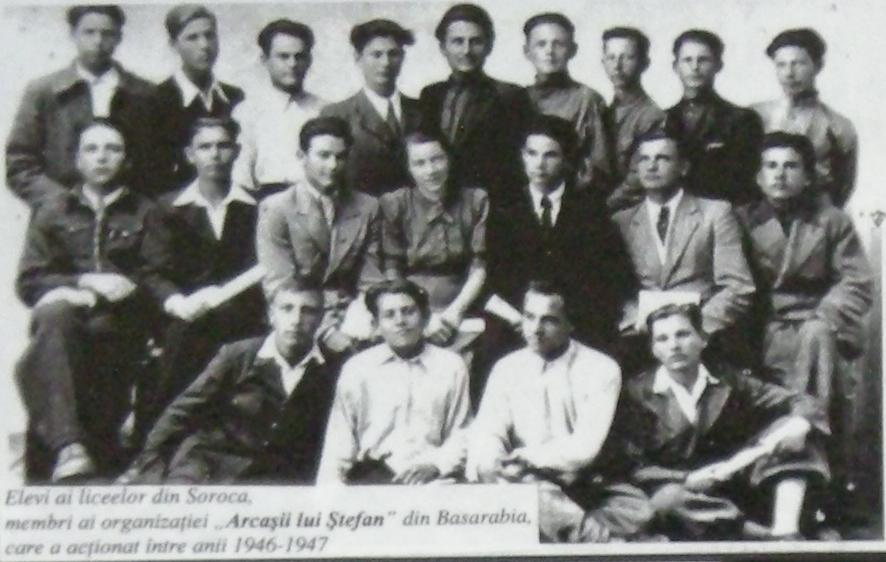
Arcaşii lui Ştefan

== Bibliography ==
- Ştefan Tudor, Organizaţia Naţională din Basarabia "Arcașii lui Ștefan", Basarabia, 1992, nr.9
- Ştefan Tudor, O.N.B. "Arcașii lui Ștefan" în Literatura şi Arta, nr 14, 16, 19, 21, 24, 25, 26 1997, aprilie-iunie
- Mihail Ursachi, Organizatia Nationala Din Basarabia Arcașii lui Ștefan: Amintiri, Muzeum
