= National Bureau of Statistics of the Republic of Moldova =

Moldova's principal government institution in charge of statistics and census data

The National Bureau of Statistics of the Republic of Moldova (NBS; Romanian: Biroul Național de Statistică, abbr. BNS) is the central administrative authority which, as the central statistical body, manages and coordinates the activity in the field of statistics from the country.

In its activity, NBS acts according to the Constitution of the Republic of Moldova, the Law on official statistics, other legislative acts, Parliament decisions, decrees of the President of the Republic of Moldova, ordinances, decisions and Government orders, international treaties of which the Republic of Moldova is part of.

The NBS elaborates independently or in collaboration with other central administrative bodies and approves the methodologies of statistical and calculation surveys of statistical indicators, in accordance with international standards, especially those of the European Union, and with the advanced practice of other countries, as well as taking into account the peculiarities of the socio-economic conditions of the Republic of Moldova, organizes, following the programme of statistical works, annually approved by the Government, statistical surveys regarding the situation and economic, social, demographic development of the country, performing the works related to the collection, processing, centralizing, storage and dissemination of statistical data.

The content published by National Bureau of Statistics on its website may be reused completely or partly, in original or modified, as well as its storage in a retrieval system, or transmitted, in any form and by any means, unless otherwise stated, under the Creative Commons Attribution 4.0 International License.
