= Armata Neagră =

Moldovan anti-Soviet group

Armata Neagră Black Army
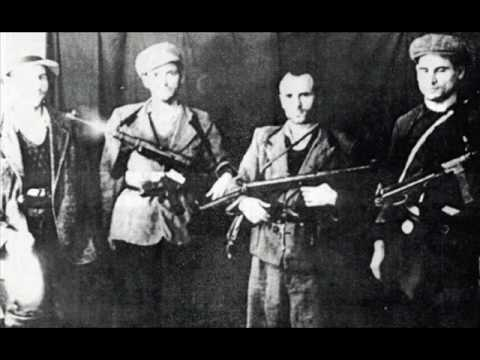
- Members of the organization
- Formation: 1949
- Dissolved: 1950
- Type: Anti-Soviet group
- Legal status: Clandestine organization
- Location: Moldovan SSR (Bessarabia)
- Official language: Romanian

The Armata Neagră (English: Black Army) was an organized anti-Soviet group in the Moldovan SSR (Bessarabia).

== Activity ==
Armata Neagră was formed in 1949 as an organized anti-Soviet group in Bessarabia. Teodor Coşcodan, Ion Ganea, Vasile Plaşca, Simion Alexa, Gavril Bodiu, Gheorghe Bogatu, Ion Coşcodan, Hariton Ciolpan, Pavel Caţer, Mihail Jardan, Grigore Iovu, Grigore Herţa, Maria Buruiană were important members of the clandestine organization. In July 1950, the organization had 50 active members.

== Bibliography ==
- Elena Postică, "Armata Neagră". Organizaţie patriotică de rezistenţă sau "bandă teroristă antisovietică", Ţara, 1995, 10 ianuarie [= în Destin Românesc, 1996, 4, p. 73-84]
