= Arcașii lui Ștefan =

Anti-Soviet organization in the Moldavian SSR

National Organization of Bessarabia "Arcașii lui Ștefan"
- Abbreviation: Arcașii lui Ștefan
- Formation: October 1945
- Dissolved: 23 March 1947
- Type: anti-Soviet group
- Location: Northeastern Bessarabia
- Leader: Vasile Bătrânac
- Volunteers: 140 members

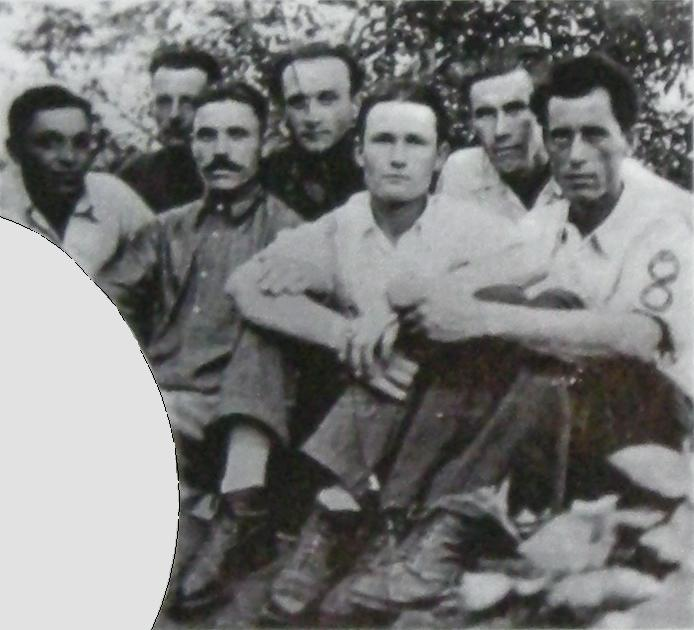
Arcașii lui Ștefan

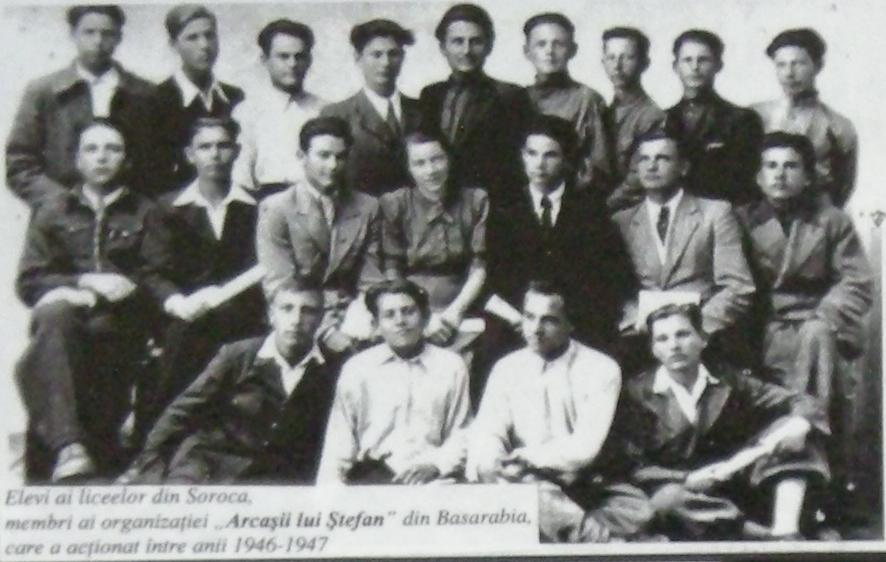
Arcașii lui Ștefan

The National Organization of Bessarabia "Arcașii lui Ștefan" (Romanian:Organizația Națională din Basarabia "Arcașii lui Ștefan") was one of the organized anti-Soviet groups in Bessarabia right after World War II.

== Activity ==
The National Organization of Bessarabia was formed in October 1945, on the territory of the former Soroca County by teachers Vasile Bătrânac, Victor Solovei, Nicolae Prăjină, Teodosie Guzun, and Anton Romașcan, as well as a student, Nichita Brumă. The organization took the name "Arcașii lui Ștefan" in October 1946; by March 1947, it had more than 140 members.

On 23 March 1947, Bătrânac was arrested by the NKVD secret police, who found a detailed list of the organization's members in his possession. Shortly after, all members, including the other leaders of "Arcașii lui Ștefan", were apprehended by the Soviet authorities. On 11 June, Bătrânac was sentenced to 25 years forced labor and sent to a camp in Siberia.

== Gallery ==
Vasile Bătrânac

== Bibliography ==
- Ștefan Tudor, Organizația Națională din Basarabia "Arcașii lui Ștefan", Basarabia, 1992, nr. 9
- Mitru Ghițiu, Unele aspecte din mișcarea de rezistență antisovietică în Basarabia postbelică, Analele Sighet 2, Instaurarea comunismului – între rezistență și represiune, Fundația Academia Civică, 1995
- Ștefan Tudor, Vsia jizni v plenu, in Nezavisimaia Moldova, 15 September 1993
- Ștefan Tudor, O.N.B. "Arcașii lui Ștefan" in Literatura și Arta, nr. 14, 16, 19, 21, 24, 25, 26 1997, April–June
- Mihail Ursachi, Organizația Națională din Basarabia Arcașii lui Ștefan: Amintiri, Muzeum
- Elena Postică, Rezistența antisovietică în Basarabia. 1944–1950, Chișinău, 1997
- Valeriu Pasat, Trudnâe stranițî istorii Moldovî. 1940–1950 [Documente] (Pages difficiles d'histoire de la Moldavie), Moscova, Ed. Terra, 1994
