= 2004 Moldovan census =

2004 census held in Moldova

- 5–12 October 2004

General information
- Country: Moldova

The 2004 Moldovan census was carried out between October 5 and October 12, 2004. The breakaway Transnistria failed to come into an agreement with the central government in Chişinău, and carried out its own census between November 11 and November 18, 2004. The results of the census in Transnistria were put into question.

Moldova's previous census was performed in 1989, when the territory of the country was part of the former Soviet Union.

The census was delayed several times and had difficulties because of political problems, ethnic tensions, and a lack of financial resources.

== Terminology ==
The questionnaires used the term "Nationality", but the sense of this term must be understood as a synonym of ethnicity, as nation can also be defined as a grouping based on language and cultural self-determination rather than on relations with a sovereign state. In the context of former the Soviet Union, nationality is often used as translation of the Russian terms (национальность / natsional'nost) used for ethnic groups, and local affiliations within the post-Soviet countries.

== Criticism ==
According to a May 19, 2005 article carried by the Moldova Azi news agency, the expert group of the International Census Observation Mission to the Republic of Moldova described the Moldovan census as "generally conducted in a professional manner", but consider that "there were a few topics in the census that were potentially more problematic". These were:

1. The expert group considered that the released total figure may actually be somewhat higher than the real population size of the country, because it includes at least some Moldovans who had been living abroad over one year at the time of the census, and who had been enumerated in the census. According to the international standards for censuses, these individuals should not have been included in the count of the total population size of the country. However, the experts also remarked that some undercount of the population can also be expected in any census operations, and that this might reduce the effect of the above-mentioned overcount.
2. The expert group concluded that the items in the questionnaire dealing with nationality and language proved to be the most sensitive, particularly with reference to the recording of responses to these questions as being "Moldovan" or "Romanian". While a large proportion of the population had spontaneously provided an answer to the question, seven of the ten teams of observers had reported cases where enumerators encouraged respondents to declare that they were Moldovan rather than Romanian. Moreover, the reports from the field also showed that even within the same family there often seemed to be some confusion about these terms. Since problems of this type had been reported by the teams of observers in many different parts of the country, and in fairly large number, the expert group concluded that special care would be required by the National Statistics Bureau to enable it to assess the quality of the data on nationality/ethnicity.

The expert group recommended that the Moldovan National Bureau of Statistics carry out an evaluation study, offered its assistance in doing so, and indicated its intention of further studying the matter itself.

Vitalie Valcov, the then director of the Department of Statistics and Sociology, stated that Transnistria did not comply with the international recommendations for carrying out a census and, thus, the data collected in Transnistria — where almost 17% of Moldova's population live — may not be taken together with the data from the rest of Moldova, since it was gathered without international monitoring. Therefore, all census figures released by the Department of Statistics and Sociology do not include territories that are under the control of the breakaway Transnistrian authorities.

== See also ==
- 2014 Moldovan census
- 2004 Census in Transnistria
