= 2014 Moldovan census =

2014 census held in Moldova

← 2004	12–25 May 2014	2024 →

General information
- Country: Moldova

The 2014 Moldovan census was held between 12 and 25 May 2014. It was organized by National Bureau of Statistics of the Republic of Moldova.

The cost of the 2014 census was 89 million MDL. The finances for organizing and conducting the census, processing the data and publishing the results came from the state budget, as well as from Moldova's development partners – Swiss Development and Cooperation (SDC), Government of Romania, Government of the Czech Republic, UNICEF, UNDP and the European Union, with the support of the United Nations Population Fund (UNFPA).

The census did not cover the breakaway republic of Transnistria, which approximately corresponds to the Administrative-Territorial Units of the Left Bank of the Dniester of Moldova. At the same time, Transnistria postponed its census for at least 2 years citing financial difficulties. Its estimated population as of the beginning of 2014 was 505.1 thousand.

== Results ==
On 31 March 2017 the National Bureau of Statistics officially announced a part of the census results. The census covered people with habitual residence (living in Moldova over 12 months regardless citizenship) and citizens gone from the country for more than 12 months. Accordingly, the census covered 2,998,235 people. In addition, estimated 193,434 persons were not covered by the census. In Chișinău municipality as many as 41% of population were not covered. The total population in Moldova covered is 2,804,801, of which about 209,000 (7.5%) were non-residents (living mostly abroad for over 12 months). The number of habitual residents in Moldova was 2,595,771.

2,754.7 thousand people (98.2%) reported their ethnicity, and the distribution is as follows:

- 75.1% Moldovans
- 7.0% Romanians
- 6.6% Ukrainians
- 4.6% Gagauz
- 4.1% Russians
- 1.9% Bulgarians
- 0.3% Roma
- 0.5% other

The 2014 census for the first time collected the information about the language they usually speak. 2,720.3 thousand reported these data as follows:

- 54.6% Moldovan,
- 24.0% Romanian,
- 14.5% Russian,
- 2.7% Ukrainian,
- 2,7% Gagauz
- 1.7% Bulgarian
- 0.5% other

About religion, 96.8% reported to be of Christian Orthodox faith.

By gender, population structure is as follows: 48.2% are men, while 51.8% are women. As many as 1,452,702 of the registered persons were females, exceeding the number of males by 100 thousand. Countrywide, for every 100 females there are 93 males.

The number of households registered in the 2014 census was of 959.2 thousand. The average size of a household is decreasing and was 2.9 persons, compared with 3.0 persons in 2004. Similar trends are typical of the residential environments: an urban household is made up, on average, of 2.7 persons, compared with 2.8 persons in 2004, while a rural household of average size was of 3.0 persons, compared with 3.1 persons in 2004.

== See also ==
- 2004 Moldovan census
