= 2018 unification declarations in Moldova and Romania =

2018 declarations of unification in Moldova and Romania with the other country

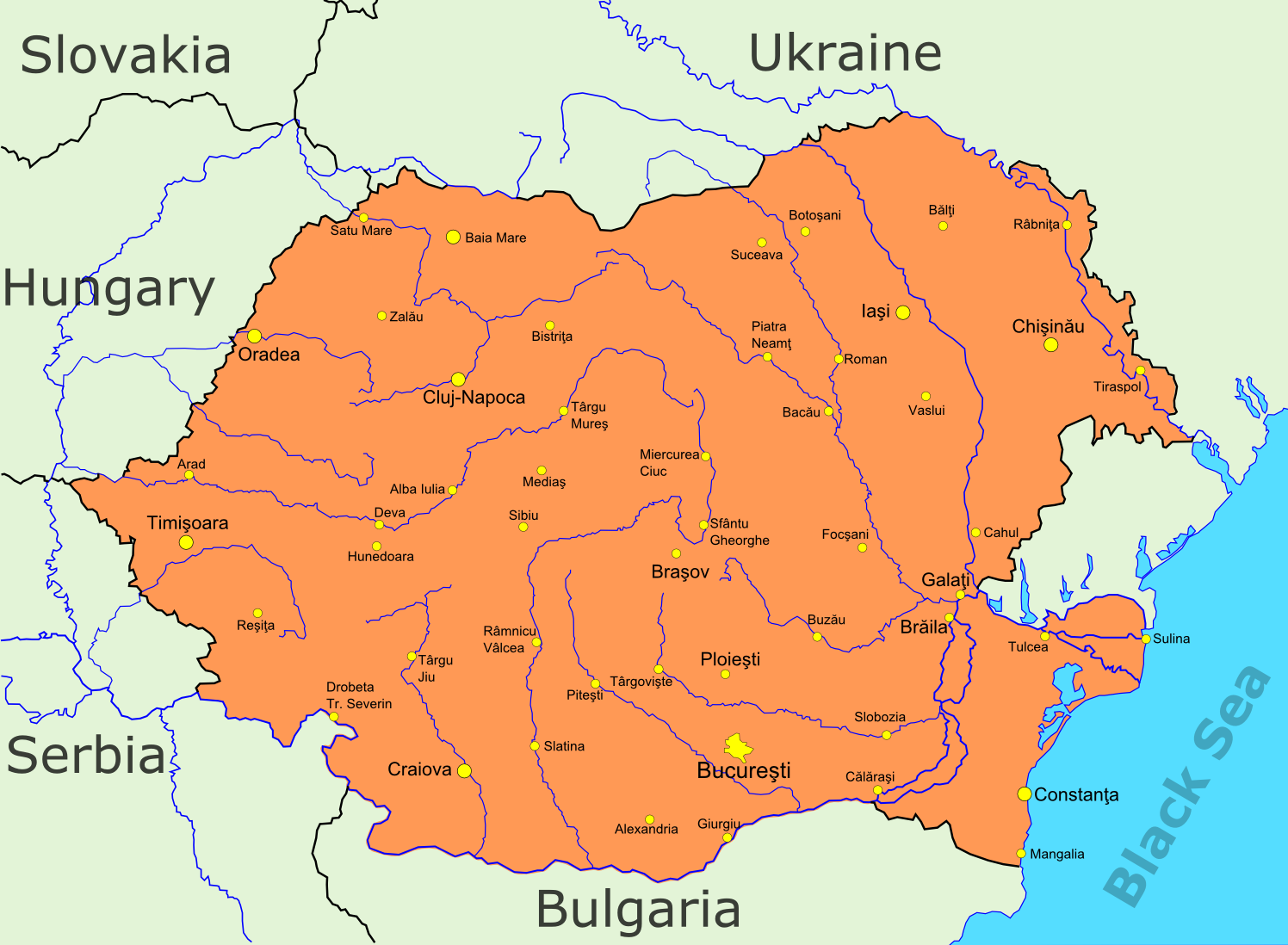
Map of the state resulting from a hypothetical unification of Moldova and Romania

In 2018, over a hundred localities in Moldova and dozens in Romania issued symbolic declarations of unification (Romanian: declarații de unire, sing.: declarație de unire) with the other country. Such declarations were also issued by some Moldovan districts and Romanian counties (which are respectively each country's first-level administrative divisions), members of the Moldovan and Romanian diasporas and other entities.

A movement for the unification of Moldova and Romania exists in both countries. Both share a common Romanian language, a predominant Eastern Orthodox faith and strong cultural and historical connections. Supporters of the movement look back on the union of Bessarabia with Romania on 27 March 1918, Bessarabia being a region corresponding up to a point with modern Moldova. As the regions of Bukovina and Transylvania also united with Romania in 1918, with the three unifications being collectively known as the Great Union (Romanian: Marea Unire) among Romanians, 2018 was a symbolic year for unionists and nationalists, celebrated as the centenary of the Great Union.

The Moldovan commune of Parcova was the first to declare unification with Romania on 23 January. It was followed by over a hundred localities in Moldova, including the towns of Cimișlia, Edineț and Ungheni, but also several districts the first of which was Strășeni District. As a response, the Romanian commune of Parva declared unification with Moldova on 19 February, being followed by dozens of localities including major cities like Iași, Constanța, Brașov, Craiova and the capital Bucharest, as well as several counties the first of which was Prahova County. Members of the Moldovan and Romanian diasporas issued unification declarations in Belgium, Canada, France, Greece, Ireland, Italy, Portugal and the United Kingdom, and even in the European Parliament, and so did Moldovan and Romanian students and teachers, primary schools and high schools, universities, monasteries and parishes, unionist associations and individuals, Transnistria War veterans and signatories of the Moldovan Declaration of Independence, among several others. Ialoveni District and Băcioi in Moldova declared unification respectively with Ilfov County and Aleșd in Romania, while Iași also declared unification with Bukovina, the northern half of which is today in Ukraine.

The declarations were not meant to carry legal weight, but their strong symbolic value elicited reactions in both Moldova and Romania. They received a negative response from the President of Moldova at the time, Igor Dodon, and the Party of Socialists of the Republic of Moldova (PSRM), to which Dodon had belonged before his election. Dodon defined the declarations as a threat to Moldovan statehood and sought the prosecution of local officials who signed them. Dodon and the PSRM launched a campaign for Moldovan localities to issue declarations against unification with Romania, reaching a number of over three hundred localities according to the PSRM, including the second-largest Moldovan city of Bălți and towns such as Soroca, Comrat and Sîngerei, as well as Ocnița District. In some localities, separate declarations in favor and against unification were issued at different times by local officials. In Romania, the Parliament adopted a declaration expressing the legitimacy of the desire of Moldovans in favor of uniting with Romania and Romania's preparation to respond to any moves towards unification by the population of Moldova.

== Background ==
Bessarabia, a geographical region corresponding up to a point with today's Moldova which was annexed in 1812 by the Russian Empire, voted for unification with Romania on 27 March 1918. The region remained under Romania until 1940, when the Soviet Union occupied and annexed the region. Thus, reunification with Romania was a largely undiscussed idea until the dissolution of the Soviet Union in 1991. Since Moldova's independence, there has been a growing movement in support of the unification of Moldova and Romania. Both share the same Romanian language and an Eastern Orthodox faith.

== Unification declarations ==
=== Moldova ===
==== Localities ====
The localities in Moldova that declared unification with Romania in 2018 are encompassed in the following list. Moldovan and Romanian media provided several lists of their own in their newspaper articles, which vary in completeness and in the order in which these places declared their unifications. This list is based mainly on information from these newspaper articles, of which only the non-conflicting accurate and verifiable information has been used. Still, some localities missing in these articles and additional details on each locality may be based on other sources. These cases are noted with citations to them. Further, the names of the localities where it was reported that declarations both in favor and against unification with Romania were issued are in italics.

In total, around 163 localities (cities, communes, municipalities or villages) of Moldova declared unification with Romania. This list does not include cities, communes, municipalities or villages that did not do this by themselves but that are part of a higher administrative unit (communes, municipalities or districts) that did so.

1. Parcova (Edineț District) – 23 January 2018. Signed by mayor Marcel Snegur and some local councillors. The commune of Parcova includes the villages of Parcova and Fîntîna Albă (spelled "Fântâna Albă" in the union declaration). The declaration was signed in the event of the Day of the Unification of the Romanian Principalities, celebrated every 24 January.
2. Ulmu (Ialoveni District)
3. Bardar (Ialoveni District)
4. Ruseștii Noi (Ialoveni District)
5. Puhoi (Ialoveni District)
6. Văsieni (Ialoveni District)
7. Feștelița (Ștefan Vodă District)
8. Opaci (Căușeni District)
9. Gotești (Cantemir District)
10. Săseni (Călărași District)
11. Nișcani (Călărași District)
12. Sărătenii Vechi (Telenești District)
13. Grătiești (Municipality of Chișinău)
14. Boghiceni (Hîncești District)
15. Codreanca (Strășeni District)
16. Floreni (Anenii Noi District) – A declaration against unification with Romania was also emitted in the locality according to the Party of Socialists of the Republic of Moldova (PSRM).
17. Tîrșiței (Telenești District) – 9 February 2018. The commune was spelled as "Târșiței" in the unification document.
18. Măgurele (Ungheni District)
19. Răzeni (Ialoveni District)
20. Cucoara (Cahul District)
21. Meleșeni (Călărași District)
22. Băcioi (Municipality of Chișinău) – 13 February 2018. Signed by the mayor Vitalie Șalari, the deputy mayor, the secretary of the commune and by 14 of the 23 local councillors; the declaration was kept open for the remaining 9 local councillors in case they wished to sign it. The union declaration with Romania also condemned the Molotov–Ribbentrop Pact. Later, on 29 March, the local council of the Romanian commune of Aleșd signed a union declaration with Moldova but also with Băcioi, as both localities were twinned, in presence of the mayor and deputy mayor of Băcioi.
23. Ordășei (Telenești District)
24. Visoca (Soroca District)
25. Bădiceni (Soroca District)
26. Drăsliceni (Criuleni District)
27. Ghiduleni (Rezina District)
28. Capaclia (Cantemir District)
29. Ursoaia (Căușeni District)
30. Cimișlia (Cimișlia District) – 16 February 2018. Signed by mayor Gheorghe Răileanu and the local authorities, which also voted 2018 as the Year of the Centenary of the Great Union. Cimișlia was the first Moldovan city that voted for unification with Romania.
31. Vatici (Orhei District) – The Vatici commune is composed by the villages of Curchi, Tabăra and Vatici.
32. Ciorești (Nisporeni District)
33. Horești (Ialoveni District)
34. Chetrosu (Drochia District)
35. Cenac (Cimișlia District)
36. Scoreni (Strășeni District)
37. Mereni (Anenii Noi District)
38. Mălăiești (Orhei District)
39. Tătărești (Strășeni District)
40. Negrești (Strășeni District)
41. Coșeni (Ungheni District) – 22 February 2018. Signed by mayor Ion Rabacu, some local councillors and several inhabitants of Coșeni (44 out of 250 at the moment of the adoption of the document by the local authorities). This was done after an assembly on 18 February proposed by Rabacu to the locals of Coșeni and after an artistic program dedicated to Grigore Vieru, a Moldovan poet, made by students on the same day of the document's official adoption. Coșeni is not a commune by itself, but a village part of the Negurenii Vechi commune.
42. Călimănești (Nisporeni District)
43. Miclești (Criuleni District)
44. Gura Galbenei (Cimișlia District)
45. Colonița (Municipality of Chișinău)
46. Călărași (Călărași District)
47. Slobozia Mare (Cahul District)
48. Copăceni (Sîngerei District)
49. Ciuciuleni (Hîncești District)
50. Cruzești (Municipality of Chișinău)
51. Tănătari (Căușeni District)
52. Sinești (Ungheni District)
53. Păulești (Călărași District)
54. Peticeni (Călărași District)
55. Lozova (Strășeni District)
56. Recea (Strășeni District)
57. Carahasani (Ștefan Vodă District)
58. Ciocîlteni (Orhei District) – The Ciocîlteni commune is composed by the villages of Ciocîlteni, Clișova Nouă and Fedoreuca.
59. Copceac (Ștefan Vodă District)
60. Țînțăreni (Telenești District)
61. Cucuruzeni (Orhei District) – The Cucuruzeni commune is composed by the villages of Cucuruzeni and Ocnița-Răzeși.
62. Mitoc (Orhei District)
63. Brînzenii Noi (Telenești District)
64. Secăreni (Hîncești District)
65. Horodiște (Călărași District) – A declaration against unification with Romania was also emitted in the locality according to the PSRM.
66. Buda (Călărași District) – A declaration against unification with Romania was also emitted in the locality according to the PSRM.
67. Sireți (Strășeni District)
68. Chircăiești (Căușeni District)
69. Cuhnești (Glodeni District)
70. Bolohan (Orhei District)
71. Sîrma (Leova District) – A declaration against unification with Romania was also emitted in the locality according to the PSRM.
72. Vărzărești (Nisporeni District)
73. Javgur (Cimișlia District)
74. Marinici (Nisporeni District) – A declaration against unification with Romania was also emitted in the locality according to the PSRM.
75. Aluniș (Rîșcani District) – A declaration against unification with Romania was also emitted in the locality according to the PSRM.
76. Ișcălău (Fălești District)
77. Pitușca (Călărași District)
78. Hirișeni (Telenești District)
79. Vălcineț (Călărași District)
80. Văleni (Cahul District)
81. Colibași (Cahul District)
82. Brînza (Cahul District)
83. Sipoteni (Călărași District)
84. Scorțeni (Telenești District)
85. Tigheci (Leova District)
86. Domulgeni (Florești District)
87. Măgdăcești (Criuleni District)
88. Dereneu (Călărași District)
89. Morozeni (Orhei District)
90. Tocuz (Căușeni District)
91. Hîrcești (Ungheni District)
92. Săiți (Căușeni District)
93. Palanca (Ștefan Vodă District)
94. Mașcăuți (Criuleni District)
95. Biești (Orhei District)
96. Bravicea (Călărași District)
97. Popeasca (Ștefan Vodă District)
98. Sărata-Galbenă (Hîncești District)
99. Stolniceni (Hîncești District)
100. Carabetovca (Basarabeasca District) – 5 March 2018. Signed by mayor Sergiu Răcilă and some local councillors. Carabetovca was the 100th locality in Moldova that declared unification with Romania and the first to do so of Basarabeasca District.
101. Cojușna (Strășeni District) – 7 March 2018. Signed by mayor Sergiu Jereghi, the deputy mayor Igor Crăciun, local councillors and some teachers and other inhabitants of the village. The declaration was signed on the 490th anniversary of the appearance of the village of Cojușna in historical records. Later, the Local Council of Cojușna approved with a majority of votes the renaming of two streets in the village. These were the Podgorenilor Street, one of the main streets of Cojușna, which was renamed to "Centenary Street" (Romanian: Strada Centenarului); and another street of the village whose name was changed to "Union Street" (Romanian: Strada Unirii). This was proposed by the independent councillor Vitalie Jereghi. A declaration against unification with Romania was also emitted in the locality according to the PSRM.
102. Fetești (Edineț District)
103. Gordinești (Edineț District)
104. Budești (Municipality of Chișinău)
105. Crihana Veche (Cahul District)
106. Sadova (Călărași District) – 10 March 2018. Signed by mayor Vladimir Susarenco, some local councillors and around 500 inhabitants. The declaration of this village was widely reported by Moldovan and Romanian media as it was the native village of Igor Dodon, the then President of Moldova and a strong opponent of the unification of Moldova and Romania. Earlier, on 6 February, 8 out of the 13 local councillors of Sadova signed a declaration in favor of Moldovan statehood and against unification with Romania. This happened without a formal meeting and while Susarenco was on the city of Călărași, which was criticized by him. Sadova was the first locality where a declaration of this kind was adopted.
107. Pepeni (Sîngerei District) – The Pepeni commune is composed by the villages of Pepeni, Pepenii Noi, Răzălăi and Romanovca.
108. Malcoci (Ialoveni District)
109. Cociulia (Cantemir District)
110. Sărăteni (Leova District) – A declaration against unification with Romania was also emitted in the locality according to the PSRM.
111. Căzănești (Telenești District)
112. Vorniceni (Strășeni District)
113. Trușeni (Municipality of Chișinău)
114. Satul Nou (Cimișlia District)
115. Badicul Moldovenesc (Cahul District)
116. Nimoreni (Ialoveni District)
117. Dolna (Strășeni District)
118. Ghidighici (Municipality of Chișinău)
119. Micleușeni (Strășeni District)
120. Crihana (Orhei District) – The Crihana commune is composed by the villages of Crihana, Cucuruzenii de Sus and Sirota.
121. Cioara (Hîncești District)
122. Ochiul Alb (Drochia District)
123. Ruseni (Edineț District)
124. Tătărești (Cahul District)
125. Baimaclia (Căușeni District) – 20 March 2018. Jointly signed by the mayor of Baimaclia Anatolie Doibani and the mayor of the Romanian locality of Corbi Virgil Baciu. The local authorities of Baimaclia were invited to Corbi for the event. On the same day, both villages were also twinned.
126. Alexandru Ioan Cuza (Cahul District) – A declaration against unification with Romania was also emitted in the locality according to the PSRM.
127. Pogănești (Hîncești District)
128. Costești (Ialoveni District) – A declaration against unification with Romania was also emitted in the locality according to the PSRM.
129. Durlești (Municipality of Chișinău)
130. Scăieni (Dondușeni District) – A declaration against unification with Romania was also emitted in the locality according to the PSRM.
131. Bălășești (Sîngerei District) – The Bălășești commune is composed by the villages of Bălășești and Sloveanca.
132. Pelinei (Cahul District)
133. Strășeni (Strășeni District)
134. Cărpineni (Hîncești District)
135. Cubolta (Sîngerei District)
136. Gașpar (Edineț District) – A declaration against unification with Romania was also emitted in the locality according to the PSRM.
137. Edineț (Edineț District)
138. Pănășești (Strășeni District)
139. Tuzara (Călărași District) – 21 March 2018. The Tuzara commune is composed by the villages of Novaci, Seliștea Nouă and Tuzara.
140. Căpriana (Strășeni District) – A declaration against unification with Romania was also emitted in the locality according to the PSRM.
141. Zberoaia (Nisporeni District)
142. Ungheni (Ungheni District) – A declaration against unification with Romania was also emitted in the locality according to the PSRM.
143. Pașcani (Hîncești District) – The Pașcani commune is composed by the villages of Pașcani and Pereni.
144. Răciula (Călărași District) – A declaration against unification with Romania was also emitted in the locality according to the PSRM.
145. Sociteni (Ialoveni District)
146. Verejeni (Telenești District)
147. Andrușul de Sus (Cahul District)
148. Zubrești (Strășeni District)
149. Fundul Galbenei (Hîncești District)
150. Petrești (Ungheni District)
151. Bursuceni (Sîngerei District)
152. Vadul lui Isac (Cahul District)
153. Podgoreni (Orhei District)
154. Curtoaia (Ungheni District) – 31 March 2018. Curtoaia is not a commune, and conforms together with Condrătești the commune of Condrătești.
155. Ciulucani (Telenești District) – March 2018, day not specified. Signed by the Local Council of Ciulucani.
156. Zîrnești (Cahul District)
157. Camenca (Glodeni District)
158. Bahmut (Călărași District)
159. Iurceni (Nisporeni District)
160. Manta (Cahul District)
161. Ratuș (Telenești District)
162. Dubăsarii Vechi (Criuleni District) – 31 July 2018. Signed by mayor Vitalie Casian, the deputy mayor and around 200 inhabitants.
163. Batîr (Cimișlia District) – 26 August 2018. Signed by 7 of the 11 local councillors of the village.

==== Districts ====
Additionally, up to four districts of Moldova declared unification with Romania.

1. Strășeni District – 21 February 2018. Signed by 19 out of the 33 district councillors. Strășeni District became the 41th entity and the first district in Moldova that declared unification with Romania. At the time, it was composed of 39 localities.
2. Telenești District – 1 March 2018. Signed by 17 out of the 33 district councillors. At the time, it was composed of 54 localities.
3. Călărași District – 1 March 2018. Signed by 19 out of the 33 district councillors. Călărași District was the first district in Moldova where the majority of its communes had voted for unification with Romania. As of 27 March 2018, 16 out of 28, including the city of Călărași, had done so. At the time, it was composed of 44 localities.
4. Criuleni District – 7 March 2018. On the same day, Criuleni District twinned with Botoșani County in Romania and declared 2018 as the Union Year in Criuleni. At the time, it was composed of 43 localities.

Furthermore, Ialoveni District and Romania's Ilfov County declared unification with each other on 15 September. Both administrative units were also twinned on the same day.

==== Other entities ====
Unification declarations in Moldova were not limited to localities and districts, as other entities also issued them. Unionist enthusiasm in educational institutions was notable. On early March, it was reported that the gymnasium of Bogzești in Telenești District had made a declaration of unification with Romania, being the first school to do so. Its declaration was signed by the school's director and by seven of its teachers. It was followed by the Philology Institute of the Academy of Sciences of Moldova and the Constantin Stere High School in the town of Soroca in Soroca District on 13 March; the Ștefan Holban High School in Cărpineni on 14 March; the Faculty of History and Philosophy of the Moldova State University at Chișinău, the Ion Creangă Gymnasium of Teleșeu in Orhei District and the split-off branch of the Shevchenko Transnistria State University in Chișinău on 27 March; the Doina and Ion Aldea-Teodorovici Art School in the town of Cornești in Ungheni District on 30 March; the Ion Ignatiuc Gymnasium of Prepelița in Sîngerei District on late March; the Călmățui Gymnasium in the village of Călmățui in Hîncești District on an unspecified day of March; and the Grigore Vieru Gymnasium in Vasilcău in Soroca District on 1 May or before. Other ones also did so at unspecified dates; these are the students of the Mihai Eminescu High School in Bălți, the Adrian Păunescu Gymnasium in Copăceni, the Pogănești Gymnasium in Pogănești, the Văsieni Gymnasium in Văsieni, the Mereșeni Gymnasium in the village of Mereșeni in Hîncești District, the Lăpușna High School in the town of Lăpușna in Hîncești District, the Ștefan Vodă High School in the town of Ștefan Vodă in Ștefan Vodă District, the Boris Cazacu High School in the town of Nisporeni in Nisporeni District, the Onisifor Ghibu High School in Chișinău, a kindergarten in the village of Tabăra in Orhei District, the Technical University of Moldova and students of the extension in Bălți of the Alexandru Ioan Cuza University in Iași in Romania.

Part of the Moldovan public showed itself highly approving of these initiatives. Thus, on 16 March, lawyers of the Panțîru și Partenerii Associated Bureau of Lawyers signed unification with Romania; the participants of an event in the village of Ciucur Mingir in Cimișlia District dedicated to Sfatul Țării member and native of the village Nicolae Cernov did so on 20 March; Moldovan Transnistria War veterans members of the Allegiance to the Motherland Public Association and over 80 signatories of the Moldovan Declaration of Independence including among them Vasile Nedelciuc, on 22 March; the National Liberal Party (PNL) of Moldova member and reserve colonel of the Moldovan Ground Forces Ion Margine on 27 March; 23 unionist inhabitants of the village of Borogani in Leova District on 14 May or before; and members of the pro-Romanian Moldovan civic and patriotic organization Faptă, nu Vorbă ("Action, not Talking") at an unspecified date.

Ecclesiastical entities also declared unification with Romania, with the first one being the parish of the Holy Hierarch Nicholas Church in Peresecina in Orhei District, with its declaration being signed by the parish's priest and by several parish councillors on 26 February 2018. It was followed by the Heroes' Monastery next to the Romanian Heroes' Cemetery at Țiganca in Cantemir District on 27 March and by the parish Intercession of the Theotokos in Săseni and the Feast of the Ascension Heroes' Monastery in the village of Stoianovca in Cantemir District at unspecified dates. Medical institutions and personnel also engaged in these declarations. The first were 65 workers of the Perinatological Center in Bălți that declared unification with Romania on 13 March; 91 medical workers of Soroca did so on 27 March while the Rev-Cer Dental Stomatological Center in Chișinău and the Stomalux Stomatological Clinic in Bălți did at unspecified dates.

Other entities that declared unification with Romania were the Moldovan Writers' Union on 12 March, the radio station Vocea Basarabiei ("Voice of Bessarabia") and the Liberal Party (PL) of Moldova on 13 March, the National Federation of Farmers of the Republic of Moldova on 16 March, the Hîncești District Council of the Syndical Federation of Education and Science and the Directorate of Education of Hîncești District on 24 March or before and the Eugène Ionesco National Theatre of Chișinău on 26 March. At unspecified dates did the Orhei branch of the Liberal Party, the InterAvo Bureau of Lawyers and the Council of the Polyleguminous Cooperative of Pănășești.

Motivated by all the unification declarations in Moldova, the PL sent a bill on the topic of unification with Romania to the Parliament of Moldova, as announced by the party's president Mihai Ghimpu on 13 March. Later, on 23 September, the PL launched a campaign to collect signatures to achieve this goal. Furthermore, on 1 and 2 September, participants of unionist rallies in Chișinău, including participants of the pro-unification Centenary March, asked the Moldovan parliament to vote for unification with Romania. In a speech on 27 March to the Parliament of Romania, the President of the Senate of Romania, Călin Popescu-Tăriceanu, stated that Moldova and Romania would unite only after the parliaments of both countries had approved so.

=== Romania ===
==== Localities ====
The unification declarations from Moldova prompted similar actions in Romania, where a large number of localities, counties and entities of other kind declared unification with the country.

In Romania's case, around 46 localities (cities, communes, municipalities or villages) of the country declared unification with Moldova. Again, the following list does not include villages, communes, municipalities and cities that did not do this by themselves but that are part of a higher administrative unit (communes, municipalities or counties) that did so. Moldovan and Romanian media did not publish lists of the places that did this, so information shown here is based on the respective cited sources.

1. Parva (Bistrița-Năsăud County) – 19 February 2018. Signed by mayor Ioan Strugari, the deputy mayor, the secretary and all of the 9 local councillors of the Local Council of Parva. Parva was the first place in Romania to declare unification with Moldova. The mayor of the commune (composed of one single village) said that, on 20 March, the declaration would be sent to the President of Romania, the President of the Senate of Romania, the President of the Chamber of Deputies of Romania and the Government of Romania, as well as all politicians and parliamentarians who could get involved in the matter. At the time, 34 localities of Moldova had declared unification with Romania, the last one being Chetrosu.
2. Bădăcin (Sălaj County) – 2 March 2018. Signed by the General Assembly of Bădăcin after the proposal of the lawyer and member of the Bucharest Bar Vasile Gil. Bădăcin was the native village of Iuliu Maniu, a figure considered important in the struggle for the unification of the Romanian nation. At the time, over 60 localities in Moldova had signed unification with Romania. Bădăcin was the second place in Romania to declare unification with Moldova after Parva.
3. Dumitra (Bistrița-Năsăud County) – 7 March 2018. Signed by all 14 local councillors of the Local Council of Dumitra, as well as by the mayor of the commune Gheorghe Bălăjan, the deputy mayor Ani Leon and the secretary Maria-Veturia Bodiu-Mureșan. The declaration asked the President of Romania, the President of the Senate of Romania, the President of the Chamber of Deputies of Romania and the Government of Romania to make every possible effort for Moldova and Romania to unite during the centenary of the Great Union.
4. Buzău (Buzău County) – 15 March 2018. Signed by all 20 local municipal councillors who attended a meeting on the issue out of the 23 conforming the Local Municipal Council of Buzău. The unification declaration was made at the initiative of the then mayor Constantin Toma, who specified that it was only symbolic and without legal effects. Shortly after, on 17 March, a Romanian folk music concert was held at the Sports Hall of Buzău to which mayors of several Moldovan localities that signed unification with Romania were invited.
5. Lugoj (Timiș County) – 15 March 2018. Signed by the Local Municipal Council of Lugoj. This proposal was the idea of Fedor Mașnița, a local municipal councillor of the People's Movement Party (PMP), and was approved by all of the local municipal councillors of Lugoj. The declaration condemned the Molotov–Ribbentrop Pact and said that "the Romanian people cannot celebrate the Centenary of the Union without a part of the Romanian territories that were the object of the great celebration of Alba Iulia, in 1918", referring to Bessarabia.
6. Corbi (Argeș County) – 20 March 2018. Jointly signed by the mayor of Corbi Virgil Baciu and the mayor of the Moldovan locality of Baimaclia Anatolie Doibani. The local authorities of Baimaclia were invited to Corbi for this event. Both villages were also twinned.
7. Brașov (Brașov County) – 21 March 2018. Signed by the Local Municipal Council of Brașov, including mayor George Scripcaru and deputy mayor Costel Mihai, who first proposed this initiative. At the time, over 120 Moldovan localities had signed unification with Romania.
8. Castelu (Constanța County) – 22 March 2018. Signed by the Local Council of Castelu.
9. Câmpina (Prahova County) – 22 March 2018. Signed by mayor Horia Laurențiu Tiseanu, the deputy mayor Ioan Adrian Pițigoi and several local councillors. At the time, 125 localities of Moldova had declared unification with Romania.
10. Săcele (Brașov County) – 22 March 2018. Signed by all 19 local municipal councillors of the Local Municipal Council of Săcele as well as by the mayor of the city Virgil Popa. This was proposed by Gheorghe Munteanu, Gheorghe Stoea and Gheorghe Băilă. They then were a local municipal councillor of the Social Democratic Party (PSD) and two other ones part of the PMP, respectively.
11. Baia Mare (Maramureș County) – 23 March 2018. Signed by 16 of the 18 local municipal councillors of the Local Municipal Council of Baia Mare. The other two who did not sign belonged to the Democratic Alliance of Hungarians in Romania (UDMR) and were absent from the meeting. The project was initiated by the local municipal councillor Cristian Niculescu Țâgârlaș, of the National Liberal Party (PNL) of Romania, and by the mayor of the city, Cătălin Cherecheș, who also signed the declaration and convocated the meeting.
12. Tașca (Neamț County) – 23 March 2018. Signed by all local councillors of the Local Council of Tașca, as well as by mayor Daniela Ursache and members of the I Believe Cultural Association, which started this initiative. Tașca was the first locality in Neamț County to declare unification with Moldova.
13. Siliștea (Constanța County) – 23 March 2018. Signed by all present local councillors of the Local Council of Siliștea, as well as mayor Mihai Soare, the deputy mayor and the secretary of the commune.
14. Broșteni (Vrancea County) – 25 March 2018. Signed by the local authorities at the initiative of the priest of the commune Gabriel Macova that was joined by many inhabitants of Broșteni. On the same day, the parish Broșteni II also signed unification with Moldova. Afterwards, on 27 March, the mayor of Broșteni Emilian-Florin Dumitru, Macova and some local councillors of the commune went to the Moldovan city of Soroca and participated in events dedicated to the centenary of the unification of Bessarabia and Romania.
15. Cornu Luncii (Suceava County) – 26 March 2018. Signed by the Local Council of Cornu Luncii, including the mayor Gheorghe Fron, the deputy mayor and the secretary. Several parish priests of the commune also signed the declaration. On the same day, a local event was organized with the participation of many members of the local authorities of Cornu Luncii, as well as teachers and students of schools of the commune, priests, and the vice president of a local association. The Romanian anthem, Deșteaptă-te, române! ("Wake up, Romanian!"), was sung and an artistic program took place.
16. Călărași (Călărași County) – 27 March 2018. Signed by mayor Daniel Ștefan Drăgulin and local municipal councillors of the Local Municipal Council of Călărași. It was reported that the declaration would be sent to the President of Romania, the Chamber of Deputies of Romania, the Senate of Romania and the Government of Romania and that a copy of the document would be sent to the Moldovan city of Călărași, with the same name as the Romanian city. Art students from the Tudor Vladimirescu Gymnasial School and the Călărași Children's Palace also participated in the event.
17. Dămuc (Neamț County) – 27 March 2018. Signed by mayor Anton Covasan, local councillors and the leaders of the I Believe Cultural Association including its president at the time, the policeman Marius Coserariu, who started the initiative. The declaration was signed at the Daniel Bucur Cultural Center, where the Moldovan anthem Limba noastră ("Our language") and the Romanian anthem were sung, the Lord's Prayer was recited, a history class on Moldova was imparted and several cultural events were held as well. Covasan later expressed disappointment because, out of all the people he had invited to the event in Dămuc, only PSD county councillor Victor Marghidan came.
18. Măgurele (Prahova County) – 27 March 2018. Signed by mayor Vasile Diaconu and all local councillors. The event was attended by the mayors of two Moldovan localities twinned with Măgurele, these being Victor Stînă, the mayor of Gura Galbenei; and Sergiu Bodrug, the mayor of the Moldovan locality of Măgurele. Students and teachers from both villages also attended the event at the Romanian locality of Măgurele. Furthermore, the twinning agreement between Măgurele and Gura Galbenei was extended for 4 years.
19. Mischii (Dolj County) – 27 March 2018. Signed by all local councillors of the Local Council of Mischii, as well as by the mayor Gheorghe Popa.
20. Piatra Neamț (Neamț County) – 27 March 2018. Signed by the Local Municipal Council of Piatra Neamț. The initiative was started by local municipal councillors of the PNL. The meeting was attended by two teachers, one of them from Moldova, as well as a history student of the Petru Rareș National College of Piatra Neamț. The Romanian anthem was also sung by a group of art students. This gathering was organized by mayor Dragoș Chitic at the meeting room of the Piatra Neamț Town Hall.
21. Slobozia (Ialomița County) – 27 March 2018. Signed by all present local councillors of the Local Municipal Council of Slobozia after a proposal by the mayor of the city Adrian Mocioniu. As 27 March is also the World Theatre Day, a theatrical act called Ziditori ai Marii Uniri ("Builders of the Great Union") was performed in the House of Culture of Slobozia.
22. Valea Iașului (Argeș County) – 27 March 2018. Signed by mayor Nicolae Barbu during a meeting of the Local Council of Valea Iașului. On the same day, the commune was also twinned with the Moldovan communes of Baimaclia and Bîrlădeni.
23. Avrig (Sibiu County) – 28 March 2018. Signed by the Local Council of Avrig. The initiative came from three PMP local councillors.
24. Bârlad (Vaslui County) – 28 March 2018. Signed by the Local Municipal Council of Bârlad after 19 out of the 21 local municipal councilors of the city and the mayor of Bârlad Dumitru Boroș voted in favor.
25. Bucharest (capital of Romania, not belonging to any county) – 28 March 2018. Signed by the General Council of Bucharest, the issued declaration asked parliamentarians of both countries to declare "the reunification of the country and of the Romanian people" and to subsequently enact laws that effect the unification between Moldova and Romania. The declaration also condemned the Molotov–Ribbentrop Pact. It was proposed in the General Council of Bucharest by councilors of the PMP, and the councilor and then vice president of the PMP Lucian Iliescu read the declaration in front of the council. He added that while it did not have legal weight, the declaration held moral value.
26. Aleșd (Bihor County) – 29 March 2018. Signed by the Local Council of Aleșd. The union declaration was not only between Moldova and Romania, but also between Aleșd and Băcioi, a Moldovan commune twinned with the former. The event was attended by the mayor of Aleșd Ioan Todoca, the mayor of Băcioi Vitalie Șalari, the deputy mayors of both localities, local councillors of Aleșd, county councillors of Bihor County, Romanian parliamentarians (including PNL senator Cornel Popa and PNL deputy Ioan Cupșa), priests and other invited guests. The union declaration also condemned the Molotov–Ribbentrop Pact and made reference to Senate Resolution No. 148 of 1991 by the United States Senate which recognized the right of Moldova and Romania to unite. Aleșd was the first locality in Bihor County to declare unification with Moldova.
27. Bistrița (Bistrița-Năsăud County) – 29 March 2018. Signed by all local municipal councillors of the Local Municipal Council of Bistrița with the exception of Antal Attila, a member of the UDMR. In the meeting, the Moldovan and Romanian anthems were sung.
28. Craiova (Dolj County) – 29 March 2018. Signed by all local municipal councillors of the Local Municipal Council of Craiova. The union declaration also mentioned Senate Resolution No. 148 of the United States Senate.
29. Onești (Bacău County) – 29 March 2018. Signed by the Local Council of Onești at the initiative of local councillor Gelu Panfil and the mayor of the commune Nicolae Gnatiuc. Onești was the first locality in Bacău County to declare unification with Moldova.
30. Roman (Neamț County) – 29 March 2018. Signed by all local municipal councillors of the Local Municipal Council of Roman. The event was attended by the Moldovan writer Vladimir Beșleagă, who was invited to the meeting.
31. Bacău (Bacău County) – 30 March 2018. Signed by mayor Cosmin Necula and by all local municipal councillors of the Local Municipal Council of Bacău. This project was initially promoted by the deputy mayor Constantin Scripăț and by local councilors Ilie Bîrzu and Doina Dragomir. The meeting was attended by the mayor of the locality of Costești in Ialoveni District of Moldova Natalia Petrea, the deputy mayor Andrei Țurcan and members of the local musical group Haiducii ("The Hajduks").
32. Botoșani (Botoșani County) – 30 March 2018. Signed by all local municipal councillors of the Local Municipal Council of Botoșani at the initiative of the mayor of the city, Cătălin Flutur.
33. Iași (Iași County) – 30 March 2018. Signed by mayor Mihai Chirica and by all local municipal councillors of the Local Municipal Council of Iași. Iași's declaration was regarded as important as the city is one of the historical capitals of the former Principality of Moldavia. Iași's unification declaration stood out for being longer and more complete than others.
34. Pietrari (Dâmbovița County) – March 2018. Day not specified. Signed by all local councillors of the Local Council of Pietrari. The initiative came from then PMP local councillor Valentin Dumitru. Due to the declarations of unification with Romania coming from Moldova, the Dâmbovița County branch of the PMP, a party that had as one of its aims to achieve the unification of both countries at the time, began to incite communes of Dâmbovița County to sign declarations of unification with Moldova, thus making Pietrari do so. Pietrari's declaration was signed before Târgoviște's, as Pietrari was reported to have been the first locality in Dâmbovița County to have declared unification with Moldova.
35. Târgoviște (Dâmbovița County) – 30 March 2018. Signed by the Local Municipal Council of Târgoviște, including the mayor.
36. Brăila (Brăila County) – 2 April 2018. Signed by all local municipal councillors of the Local Municipal Council of Brăila at the initiative of Lucian Căprariu, an independent politician. Brăila County also declared unification with Moldova on the same day. In fact, their unification declarations had the same text.
37. Năvodari (Constanța County) – 2 April 2018. Signed by the Local Council of Năvodari.
38. Beclean (Bistrița-Năsăud County) – 10 April 2018. Signed by the Local Council of Beclean after having been proposed to declare unification with Moldova by Caius Cârcu, then the first deputy prime minister of the PMP branch of Bistrița-Năsăud County. The president of this branch, Ionuț Simionca, had already proposed the mayor of Beclean, Nicolae Moldovan, to do so two months earlier.
39. Alba Iulia (Alba County) – 22 April 2018. Signed by the local authorities of the city. This initiative was proposed by Angela Moldovan, a local municipal councillor of the city. Alba Iulia is remarkable for its symbolic importance to the Great Union, as it is the city where it is considered to have been achieved.
40. Putna (Suceava County) – 22 April 2018. Signed by all present local councillors of the Local Council of Putna, which met in the Putna Monastery. The proposal to do this came from the mayor of the commune Gheorghe Coroamă, and three copies of the union declaration were made. One was kept on the Putna Town Hall, another in the local school and the third in the Putna Monastery. This monastery is the place where the important Romanian historical figure of Stephen the Great is buried.
41. Constanța (Constanța County) – 25 April 2018. Signed by all 27 local municipal councillors that attended the meeting. This initiative was started by PMP members Alexandru Zabara, Cătălin Papuc and Secil Cantaragiu. At this point, over 150 localities in Moldova had signed unification with Romania.
42. Turda (Cluj County) – 26 April 2018. Signed by all 21 local municipal councillors of the Local Municipal Council of Turda. This initiative was started by the mayor of the town Cristian Matei, who wrote the declaration. Turda was the first locality in Cluj County to declare unification with Moldova.
43. Isaccea (Tulcea County) – 27 April 2018. Signed by 14 of the 15 local councillors of the Local Council of Isaccea. The project was started by local councillor Petcu Silviu Ștefan. The declaration condemned the Molotov–Ribbentrop Pact.
44. Baru (Hunedoara County) – 12 May 2018. Signed by the Local Council of Baru at the House of Culture of the commune in the presence of many inhabitants of Baru. The initiative came from the mayor Daniel Răducanu and the Free Dacians Association. The event was also attended by Fabius Kiszely, then the prefect of Hunedoara County.
45. Horgești (Bacău County) – 24 May 2018. Signed by all present local councillors of the Local Council of Horgești as well as the secretary of the commune, Radu Alupei, at the initiative of local councillor Ion Dancă. The Molotov–Ribbentrop Pact was condemned in the declaration.
46. Câmpia Turzii (Cluj County) – 29 November 2018. Signed by all local municipal councillors of the Local Municipal Council of Câmpia Turzii and also by the mayor of the city Dorin Lojigan. This had already been proposed back in April by Adrian Mischian, a PMP local municipal council of the city.

It was attempted to issue union declarations in other localities as well. Two PMP local councillors of the commune of Huși, one being Bogdan Trifan who began this initiative, presented a union declaration with Moldova to be approved by mayor Ioan Ciupilan and by half plus one of the 19 local councilors of the Local Council of Huși on 29 March. Had it been approved, Huși would have been the first locality in Vaslui County to declare unification with Moldova. Also on 29 March, during the meeting in Aleșd in which the union declaration with Băcioi and Moldova was signed, PNL deputy Ioan Cupșa announced that within Bihor County, union declarations with Moldova were also being planned in the communes of Aușeu and Vadu Crișului and in the city of Oradea. On 21 April, during a conference of the PMP branch of Cluj County, party member Eugen Tomac said that the party had requested the Local Municipal Council of Cluj-Napoca to issue a unification declaration with Moldova, as these declarations had an "extremely strong political content" through which it was possible to send "a message of openness to the second Romanian state", referring to Moldova. The same request was done to the County Council of Cluj.

Furthermore, on 28 November, during the centenary of the union of Bukovina with Romania, the Local Municipal Council of Iași declared unification with Bukovina as well. This was done through a resolution that was unanimously voted for and signed by mayor Chirica and all local municipal councilors. Among other things, the resolution condemned the Molotov–Ribbentrop Pact, recognized the "eternal" belonging of Northern Bukovina and the Hertsa region to Greater Romania and expressed support for the diffusion of Romanian-language resources for the Romanian minority in these two regions.

==== Counties ====
Just as in Moldova, a number of counties of Romania, eleven more precisely, also declared unification with the country.

1. Prahova County – 7 March 2018. Signed by all county councillors of the County Council of Prahova. Prahova County was the first county in Romania to adopt a unification declaration with Romania. This event was announced by the vice president of the County Council of Prahova, Ludmila Sfârloagă.
2. Timiș County – 20 March 2018. Signed by all present county councillors of the County Council of Timiș. The proposal came from Roxana Iliescu, then member of the PMP and vice president of the County Council of Timiș. The first county councillor to sign the declaration was PSD member Călin Dobra.
3. Buzău County – 22 March 2018. Signed by the County Council of Buzău. The unification declaration expressed support for the unification between Moldova and Romania and for the accession of the former into the European Union (EU), ending with the phrase "Long live Greater Romania!".
4. Bistrița-Năsăud County – 27 March 2018. Signed by all present county councillors of the County Council of Bistrița-Năsăud. The event was attended by the president of Glodeni District of Moldova Ioan Leucă and by some mayors from localities in the district. Once there, Leucă made several statements, including that he was hopeful the unification between Moldova and Romania would eventually come to fruition. At the time, Glodeni District was twinned with Bistrița-Năsăud County.
5. Constanța County – 27 March 2018. Signed by all present county councillors with the exception of one PNL member, who abstained from voting. The initiative was started by the PMP branch for Constanța.
6. Iași County – 27 March 2018. Signed by the County Council of Iași after a proposal from PMP members. Association agreements with the Moldovan districts of Basarabeasca, Briceni, Căușeni, Criuleni, Dondușeni, Edineț, Glodeni, Florești, Rîșcani and Ștefan Vodă were also approved in the same session.
7. Alba County – 28 March 2018. Signed by several county councillors of the County Council of Alba. Many other projects were also approved at the meeting.
8. Teleorman County – 29 March 2018. Signed by all county councillors of the County Council of Teleorman at the initiative of PMP county councillor Adrian Florescu.
9. Galați County – 30 March 2018. Signed by the County Council of Galați. In the declaration, the Molotov–Ribbentrop Pact was condemned and the parliaments of Moldova and Romania were urged to declare unification between the two countries. The proposal came from PMP county councilor Romulus Iaru. At the same meeting, two association agreements between Galați County and the two Moldovan districts of Cahul and Hîncești were also approved. Such an agreement had already been approved between Galați County and Anenii Noi District of Moldova one month earlier, in February.
10. Neamț County – 30 March 2018. Signed by the president of the County Council of Neamț Ionel Arsene and the county secretary Maria Cătălina Grăpinoiu. At the meeting, a tense exchange of comments between Arsene and the vice president of the County Council of Neamț Laurențiu Dulamă took place. After Arsene presented the declaration, Dulamă announced he had already submitted a unification declaration a few days ago. He asked to be allowed to read his declaration, which was rejected by a vote, and Dulamă accused Arsene of stealing his idea. The Romanian anthem was played at the meeting. The event was attended by the president of Moldova's Criuleni District Veaceslav Burlac, who left before the exchange between Arsene and Dulamă.
11. Brăila County – 2 April 2018. Signed by the County Council of Brăila at the initiative of PMP member Viorel Botea. The city of Brăila also declared unification with Moldova on the same day. In fact, their unification declarations had the same text.

There were also attempts in other counties to adopt unification declarations with Moldova. On 20 March, PNL county councillors sent to the County Council of Bacău a union declaration that was to be adopted on 27 March. Formally presented the day before, several county councillors expressed concerns regarding the divisive and sensitive nature of the topic of unification with Romania within Moldovan society and a vote for its adoption was not carried out. According to PNL county councillor Cezar Olteanu, PNL county councillors had already made a similar proposal two years before, around the time of the anniversary of the 1918 unification, but the president of the County Council of Bacău at the time, Dragoș Benea, did not take the proposal seriously. On 2 April, PNL county councillors of the County Council of Botoșani presented a request to issue a declaration of unification with Moldova to the secretary of the county council. On 21 April, Tomac announced that the PMP had requested the County Council of Cluj to declare unification with Moldova; the same was requested to the Local Municipal Council of Cluj-Napoca. On 26 April, a unification declaration with Moldova was put to vote in Satu Mare County's county council. The initiative was started by PNL county councillor Adrian Cozma, and it was signed by 18 county councillors belonging to the PNL, the PSD and the Alliance of Liberals and Democrats (ALDE). The UDMR's county councillors refused to sign the declaration and abandoned the meeting, and it was not signed either by the president of the county council Csaba Pataki. When asked about his refusal to sign the declaration, Pataki stated that he did not entirely agree with its content, although he was deciding whether he would sign it later and that the UDMR county councillors would likewise have time to decide on this. He also stated that, as president of the County Council of Satu Mare, he would send the declaration to Bucharest.

On 28 March, the document "Declaration for the celebration of the union of Bessarabia with Romania" was signed in Maramureș County. Furthermore, Ilfov County and Moldova's Ialoveni District declared unification with each other on 15 September. Both administrative units were also twinned on the same day.

==== Other entities ====
Similarly to Moldova, these declarations were also made by other entities, and unionist activism in educational institutions was noteworthy in Romania as well. The Vasile Conta High School in the town of Târgu Neamț in Neamț County declared unification with Moldova on 27 March, the Emil Botta National College in Adjud in Vrancea County did so on 30 March and the Constantin Angelescu High School of Ianca in Brăila County did on 18 April. On 15 November, a class of the Nicolae Bălcescu Gymnasial School in Oradea signed a union declaration with Moldova that also expressed support for the minority rights of the Romanians in Bulgaria, Serbia and Ukraine, as well as of the ethnic groups living on the Balkans closely related to the Romanians (the Aromanians, Megleno-Romanians and Istro-Romanians). Over the next week, the rest of the classes at the school signed similar declarations, which were then sent to the Țării Crișurilor Museum of the city. This was an initiative supported by Viorel Dolha, president of the General Association of Teachers of Romania (AGIRo). AGIRo would continue to encourage the emission of declarations of unification with Moldova and in support of the Romanian diaspora and of ethnic groups related to the Romanians throughout Romanian schools, which were signed by students and teachers of over 1,000 schools in Romania and then sent to various other museums in the country, including the National Museum of the Union in Alba Iulia. These declarations continued even in 2019 with the backing of AGIRo, having been signed by a final figure of hundreds of teachers and thousands of students.

Unification declarations with Moldova were also made outside of educational entities. The parish of the village of Vâlcele in Covasna County signed unification with Moldova on 26 February; the Romanian Dacia Museum, dedicated to Romanian auto racing, in Satu Mare in Satu Mare County did on 15 March; and the parish Broșteni II in Broșteni did on 25 March, on the same day that the commune in which it is located did it. Between 6 and 9 August, the Congress of Teachers of Romania and Teachers of Romanian Ethnicity was held in Alba Iulia. On it participated hundreds of teachers from Moldova and Romania but also from the oblasts of Chernivtsi and Odesa in Ukraine and the Timok Valley in Serbia, which have substantial ethnic Romanian minorities. During the congress, a unification declaration with Moldova was issued, and it was also requested that the Romanian language be promoted among the Romanians of Serbia and Ukraine. On 21 November, the Timiș County branch of the Association of Communes of Romania declared unification with Moldova.

Furthermore, the Parliament of Romania notably adopted on 27 March, on the centenary of the union of Bessarabia with Romania, a declaration that recognized the desire of Moldovans in favor of unification with Romania as "fully legitimate" and stated that Romania and its citizens would always be prepared to respond to "any organic manifestation of reunification" on the part of the Moldovan population. Several politicians and other figures attending the session made statements in support of unification between Moldova and Romania, including Popescu-Tăriceanu, who noted that Moldova and Romania would unite only after the parliaments of both countries had approved so.

=== Diaspora ===
The Moldovan and Romanian diasporas are large ones, with the former being composed of around 1 million people (with approximately 2.7 million people living in Moldova as of 2020–2021) and the latter consisting of 4–6 million people (in comparison to the about 19 million people living in Romania as of 2020). These diasporas also participated in the unification declarations of 2018.

One example of this was Paris, in France, where the Moldovan organization Union Makes Force Association signed unification with Romania on 11 March. Later, in Milan, Italy, Moldovan citizens of the city met and signed a declaration in support of the unification of Moldova and Romania on 13 March. A similar declaration was signed in Parma, also in Italy, on 18 March, during an event organized by the Union-Parma Association in which dozens of Romanians and Moldovans living in Parma and other parts of Emilia-Romagna (in northern Italy) participated. Another declaration was signed on Lisbon, Portugal, on the same day.

These declarations were also made and signed by the Moldovan and Romanian diasporas in several other cities, such as in Bergamo, Padua, Portogruaro, Rome, Treviso, Venice and Verona (all in Italy), Athens (in Greece), London (in the United Kingdom), Brussels (in Belgium) and Dublin (in Ireland). They also happened outside Europe, in Canada, where the Moldovan diaspora of Calgary signed a unification declaration on 31 March. The Moldovan and Romanian diaspora of Edmonton, also in Canada, did the same on 19 May. Both of these declarations were done in Romanian Orthodox churches in the cities.

Finally, on 5 September, Romanians from various areas that used to be part of Romania signed a declaration of unification with Romania under the old borders of Greater Romania in the European Parliament. This was attended by the mayor of Corbi, located in Romania. Representatives of the Romanians in Ukraine complained about the increasingly deficient situation of their minority rights and that their children would end up not knowing their native Romanian language. The situation of the Romanians of Serbia, specifically in the region of the Timok Valley, was also mentioned.

== Reactions ==
=== In Moldova ===
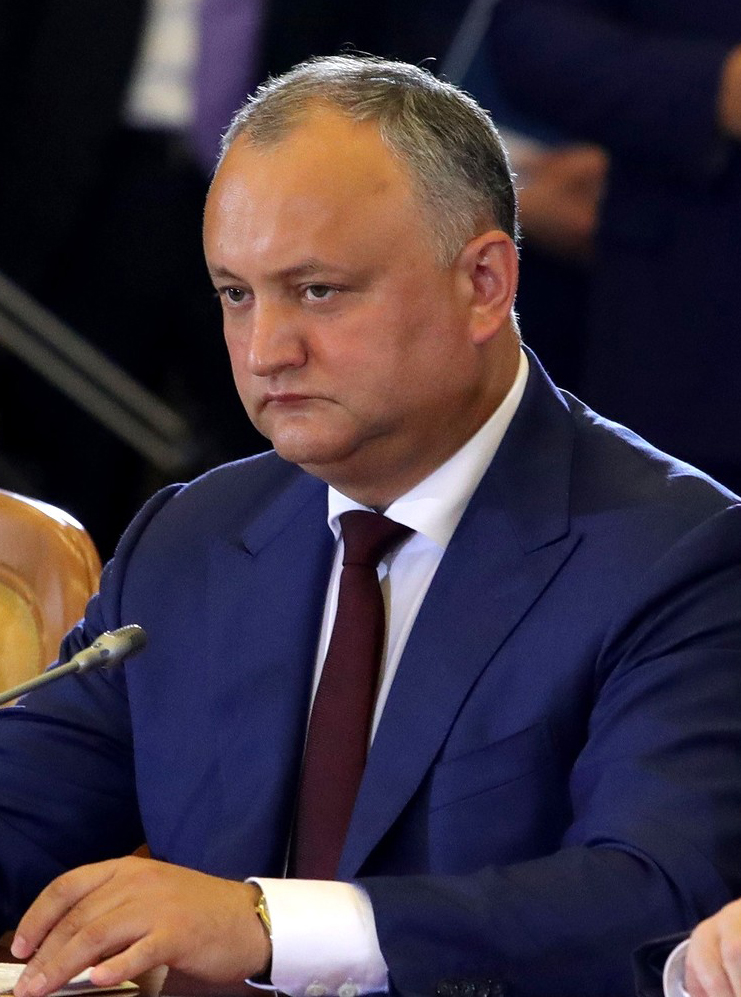
Igor Dodon, former President of Moldova, in 2018. Dodon was one of the main figures in Moldova against the declarations of unification with Romania by Moldovan localities, having proposed to prosecute those who signed them.

In Moldova, the union declarations elicited a negative response from the Party of Socialists of the Republic of Moldova (PSRM) and in particular from the then President of Moldova Igor Dodon, who had been a member of this party before the start of his term. Dodon characterized these declarations as having an "anti-state, anti-popular and unconstitutional" character and said that he did not see a solely symbolic meaning behind them, stating that they were part of an endeavor with the objective of getting the maximum number of the Moldovan population possible to advocate for "the liquidation of Moldovan statehood". He described Moldovan local officials which involved themselves into these declarations as either "strayed" or "bought with money", and said that those who signed them risked criminal prosecution. He would later announce his intention to propose to the Moldovan parliament a law project that would allow the prosecution of local officials who issued unification declarations. Dodon criticised that similar actions would have received a harsher response in other states, such as Romania, and requested a meeting of the Supreme Security Council (CSS) of Moldova. Most CSS members condemned the mayors and local officials who signed unification declarations. Dodon also reprimanded the "indifferent" actions of certain Moldovan state institutions that had not done anything to stop the declarations; the executive secretary of the PSRM, Vlad Batrîncea, implied that the unionist movement had the "tacit complicity" of the state authorities. Batrîncea would also affirm that the only result of the unification declarations would be the consolidation of the Moldovan people and the strengthening of the statehood of Moldova. As a counterreaction to the unification declarations, Dodon started a campaign against the unification of both countries and in favor of the statehood of Moldova, with the PSRM collecting declarations by Moldovan localities against unification with Romania. According to Dodon, in less 24 hours since the start of this campaign on 6 February, 53 Moldovan localities signed these declarations; by 24 March, this number would have risen to 302 according to the PSRM.

Despite the strong backlash from Dodon, there was not much response overall to the union declarations from other major Moldovan political figures. The Prime Minister of Moldova or the President of the Moldovan Parliament did not comment on these events. Despite this, the Prime Minister of Moldova, then Pavel Filip, did refer to the unification declarations indirectly on a couple of occasions, once stating that "union is not made with declarations, but through projects of interconnection of electric energy systems" while praising the relations between Moldova and Romania and later stating while on a meeting with the then Prime Minister of Romania Viorica Dăncilă that "in Chișinău, it has become a tendency to shout loudly and declare yourself in favor of unification with Romania" but that other more pragmatic focuses, such as the realization of social or infrastructural connection projects, "will bring many more results" than these declarations. Furthermore, the president of the Moldovan parliament at the time, Andrian Candu, attended the 27 March session of the Romanian parliament in which the declaration dedicated to the centenary of the unification of Bessarabia with Romania was approved, although he made more reserved statements than other figures present at the event. He also described himself as not a unionist, describing the topic of unification between the two countries as complicated and delicate and as an issue to be careful with, even saying that it could lead to civil war in Moldova.

Another Moldovan figure against unification with Romania at the time was the then başkan (governor of Gagauzia) Irina Vlah. In response to the unification declarations that were happening in Moldova, Vlah announced that she would hold an "extended council" to "defend the statehood of the Republic of Moldova". Thus, on 24 February 2018, the local authorities of Gagauzia discussed the possibility of unification with Romania in Tomai, Gagauzia. This meeting was attended by several notable politicians including former başkan Dumitru Croitor, the then president of the Halk Topluşu (the People's Assembly of Gagauzia) Vladimir Cîssa, the Democratic Party of Moldova (PDM) deputy Nicolai Dudoglo (who announced that he had begun a collection of signatures against the unification with Romania that had obtained 10,000 signatures) and from Corneliu Dudnic, another PDM deputy. Dudnic stated that, if unification took place, "I would be the first to take the automatic pistol and go defend Gagauzia". At the end of the meeting, a resolution in favor of supporting the independence of Moldova was approved. Furthermore, the Ministry of Justice of Moldova was asked to ban all political parties and organizations in favor of unification with Romania and the Parliament of Moldova was asked to ban dual citizenship and to condemn those in favor of the unionist movement. Vlah also asked Russia, Turkey and the United Nations (UN) to be "guarantors" of Gagauzia so that it can change its political status in case Moldova changes its. Vlah had already said back in 2017 that "Gagauzia has always been against unification with Romania", that "those who make declarations about unification will not be received in Gagauzia" (referring at that time to the former President of Romania Traian Băsescu, a supporter of the unification between Moldova and Romania who said it is possible that he would travel to Gagauzia) and that "we [referring to the Gagauz people] are more statist [that is, supporters of Moldova's continued statehood] than anyone". According to Timpul de dimineață, in response to the unification declarations, every single one of Gagauzia's localities signed a declaration in favor of Moldovan statehood.

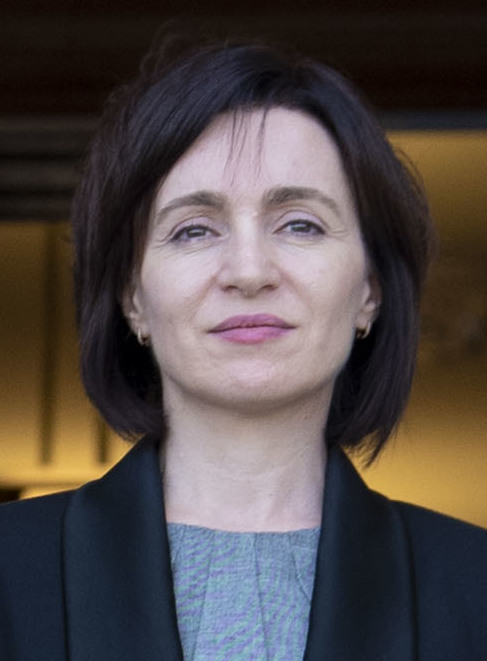
Maia Sandu, former PAS president and current President of Moldova, in 2019. While not commenting on the unification declarations, Sandu is a supporter of the unification between Moldova and Romania, and she criticized Dodon's proposals to legally quash the movement in 2018.

In contrast to this, there were also people in Moldova who were receptive of these events. Daniel Ioniță, then the Romanian ambassador to Moldova, said that, during the centernary of the Great Union, "Romanians, those who feel Romanian, have every right to rejoice", but specified that the unification declarations were only symbolic and without legal connotations. Ioniță also said that he was not particularly happy or sad, as he believed that some Moldovan politicians would use these declarations to attack Romania. Furthermore, following Dodon's proposal for a law that would allow the prosecution of local officials who signed unification declarations, Maia Sandu, then the president of the Party of Action and Solidarity (PAS), accused Dodon of dividing the Moldovan society and establishing "a dictatorship of thought and expression" by trying to ban the unionist movement and attempting to punish those who support it. She also added that Dodon should be making anti-corruption laws and reforms instead of trying to suppress freedom of expression to achieve a stronger Moldovan state and that "Dodon should not fight with unionists, but with thieves". She had previously said that "if there was a referendum for unification, I would vote 'yes'". Later, Andrei Țurcanu, writer and member of the first parliament of independent Moldova, said that these unification declarations "are not so symbolic because something happened down there, in the villages" and that the independence of Moldova, while "valid" at first, is an "impossible" path to keep going on and that the people have realized this. He continued by stating that "after 1989, these declarations of unification are the most important popular initiatives, the most promising" and that "once a mass movement starts, politicians will come to take the lead of this movement". In addition, as previously stated, the Liberal Party of Moldova sent a bill on the unification of Moldova with Romania to the Moldovan parliament and later tried to achieve unification with Romania by collecting signatures. The Moldovan diaspora too started making declarations of unification between the two countries.

The unification declarations again put on the political agenda of Moldova the topic of unification with Romania and the opposition to it. The then incoming 2019 Moldovan parliamentary election also sparked more enthusiasm among those who supported it, which could also explain Dodon's actions of voicing himself strongly against it, this possibly being motivated by electoral interest. According to Moldovan politologist Dionis Cenușă, at the time, demonstrations and actions in favor of unification with Romania favored the pro-Russian forces of Moldova and the PDM, then the ruling party of the country. According to him, any manifestation of support for unification with Romania "helps voters with pro-Russian or pro-Moldova, pro-state views to mobilize", helping as well the PDM, which benefited from polarization in Moldova and confrontations between supporters of the unification with Romania and those who opposed it that helped the PDM position itself as a more neutral "third party". Cenușă also said that any "artificial" attempt to promote unification with Romania through unification declarations "and other types of activities closely related to political public relations" affect and discredit the unification movement rather than favor it. This would be due to the fact that "much higher expectations than the tangible results that can be offered to citizens who have possible unionist views are created", which would make them "actually believe that this political and geopolitical project can be realized in 2018 or in a few years".

==== Anti-unification declarations ====
In response to the unification declarations, the PSRM began a campaign for Moldovan localities to make declarations against unification with Romania which started on 6 February. On that day, then PSRM member of the Municipal Council of Chișinău Ion Ceban said that 21 localities had signed anti-unification declarations. The next day, Dodon stated that, in less than 24 hours, 53 Moldovan localities had adopted these declarations. He added that "those who wanted to test how patriotic and statist the Moldovans can be, can now see the results" and that the "unionist ideologues" had received the opposite of what they wanted, because instead of "union", they received "patriotism for Moldova". On 8 February, Batrîncea announced that the number of localities that adopted this type of declarations was now over 100. As of 12 February, this number was said to be 141; as of 15 February, 176; as of 16 February, 186; and as of 17 February, 195. According to Batrîncea, on 20 February, 217 Moldovan localities, representing over one million citizens, had signed declarations against unification with Romania. As of 22 February, the number of them was said to be 234; 250 as of 26 February; 264 as of 7 March and 302 as of 24 March. Batrîncea stated that, out of this final figure, 259 of the localities had their declarations signed by their mayors and by a majority of their local and district councillors while over 40 had them signed during meetings of their own inhabitants.

The localities in Moldova that declared themselves to be against unification with Romania and in favor of Moldovan statehood in 2018 are encompassed in the following list. It is based almost entirely on the list given by the PSRM on 24 March 2018. The order in which the locations are presented virtually follows the order given in the 24 March list of the PSRM in the absence of data that would allow a chronological order. Still, some localities missing in this list and additional details on each locality may be based on other sources. These cases are noted with citations to them. Further, the names of the localities where it was reported that declarations both in favor and against unification with Romania were issued are in italics.

In total, around 302 localities (cities, communes, municipalities or villages) of Moldova declared themselves against unification with Romania and in favor of Moldovan statehood as claimed by the PSRM. This list again does not include cities, communes, municipalities or villages that did not do this by themselves but that are part of a higher administrative unit (communes, municipalities or districts) that did so.

1. Briceni (Briceni District) – 6 February 2018. Declaration and formal decision signed by the mayor and by the majority of local councillors.
2. Lipcani (Briceni District)
3. Balasinești (Briceni District)
4. Bălcăuți (Briceni District) – 6 or 7 February 2018. Declaration and formal decision signed by the mayor and by the majority of local councillors.
5. Beleavinți (Briceni District) – 6 February 2018. Declaration and formal decision signed by the mayor and by the majority of local councillors.
6. Berlinți (Briceni District) – 6 February 2018. Declaration and formal decision signed by the majority of local councillors.
7. Bogdănești (Briceni District) – 19 February 2018. Formal decision signed by the majority of local councillors.
8. Cotiujeni (Briceni District) – 6 February 2018. Declaration and formal decision signed by the mayor and by the majority of local councillors.
9. Grimăncăuți (Briceni District)
10. Halahora de Sus (Briceni District)
11. Mărcăuți (Briceni District) – 6 February 2018. Declaration and formal decision signed by the mayor and by the majority of local councillors.
12. Mihăileni (Briceni District)
13. Slobozia-Șirăuți (Briceni District)
14. Tețcani (Briceni District)
15. Cupcini (Edineț District)
16. Alexeevca (Edineț District) – 6 February 2018. Declaration signed by the mayor and by the majority of local councillors.
17. Bleșteni (Edineț District)
18. Brătușeni (Edineț District) – 6 February 2018. Declaration signed by the mayor and by the majority of local councillors.
19. Burlănești (Edineț District)
20. Cepeleuți (Edineț District)
21. Constantinovca (Edineț District)
22. Gașpar (Edineț District) – 6 or 7 February 2018. Declaration signed by the majority of local councillors. A declaration of unification with Romania was also emitted in the locality.
23. Goleni (Edineț District) – 6 February 2018. Declaration signed by the majority of local councillors.
24. Hancăuți (Edineț District)
25. Hlinaia (Edineț District)
26. Lopatnic (Edineț District)
27. Rotunda (Edineț District) – 12 February 2018. Declaration signed by the majority of local councillors.
28. Șofrîncani (Edineț District)
29. Stolniceni (Edineț District)
30. Terebna (Edineț District)
31. Tîrnova (Edineț District)
32. Ocnița (Ocnița District) – 6 February 2018. Declaration signed by the majority of local councillors.
33. Ocnița (Ocnița District)
34. Frunză (Ocnița District)
35. Otaci (Ocnița District) – 6 or 7 February 2018. Declaration signed by the mayor and by the majority of local councillors.
36. Bîrlădeni (Ocnița District) – 6 or 7 February 2018. Declaration signed by the mayor and by the majority of local councillors.
37. Bîrnova (Ocnița District) – 6 or 7 February 2018. Declaration signed by the mayor.
38. Călărășeuca (Ocnița District) – 6 or 7 February 2018. Declaration signed by the mayor and by the majority of local councillors.
39. Corestăuți (Ocnița District) – 6 or 7 February 2018. Declaration signed by the mayor and by the majority of local councillors.
40. Gîrbova (Ocnița District)
41. Grinăuți-Moldova (Ocnița District) – 6 or 7 February 2018. Declaration signed by the mayor and by the majority of local councillors.
42. Lencăuți (Ocnița District)
43. Mihălășeni (Ocnița District)
44. Naslavcea (Ocnița District)
45. Sauca (Ocnița District)
46. Unguri (Ocnița District) – 6 February 2018. Declaration and formal decision signed by the mayor and by the majority of local councillors.
47. Vălcineț (Ocnița District) – 6 February 2018. Declaration signed by the mayor and by the majority of local councillors.
48. Arionești (Dondușeni District)
49. Corbu (Dondușeni District)
50. Crișcăuți (Dondușeni District)
51. Elizavetovca (Dondușeni District)
52. Horodiște (Dondușeni District)
53. Moșana (Dondușeni District)
54. Pocrovca (Dondușeni District)
55. Dondușeni (Dondușeni District)
56. Scăieni (Dondușeni District) – A declaration of unification with Romania was also emitted in the locality.
57. Rîșcani (Rîșcani District) – 12 February 2018. Declaration and formal decision signed by the majority of local councillors.
58. Costești (Rîșcani District) – 12 February 2018. Formal decision signed by the mayor and by the Local Council of Costești.
59. Alexăndrești (Rîșcani District) – 12 February 2018. Declaration and formal decision signed by the majority of local councillors.
60. Aluniș (Rîșcani District) – A declaration of unification with Romania was also emitted in the locality.
61. Bulhac (Rîșcani District) – 12 February 2018. Declaration and formal decision signed by the majority of local councillors.
62. Grinăuți (Rîșcani District)
63. Hiliuți (Rîșcani District) – 12 February 2018. Declaration and formal decision signed by the majority of local councillors.
64. Malinovscoe (Rîșcani District) – 12 February 2018. Declaration and formal decision signed by the majority of local councillors.
65. Nihoreni (Rîșcani District)
66. Petrușeni (Rîșcani District)
67. Pîrjota (Rîșcani District)
68. Răcăria (Rîșcani District) – 6 or 7 February 2018. Declaration and formal decision signed by the mayor and by the majority of local councillors.
69. Văratic (Rîșcani District)
70. Vasileuți (Rîșcani District) – 6 or 7 February 2018. Declaration and formal decision signed by the majority of local councillors.
71. Zăicani (Rîșcani District)
72. Antoneuca (Drochia District)
73. Baroncea (Drochia District)
74. Cotova (Drochia District)
75. Dominteni (Drochia District)
76. Fîntînița (Drochia District)
77. Hăsnășenii Noi (Drochia District) – 6 or 7 February 2018. Formal decision signed by the mayor and by the majority of local councillors.
78. Maramonovca (Drochia District)
79. Miciurin (Drochia District)
80. Palanca (Drochia District)
81. Pelinia (Drochia District)
82. Pervomaiscoe (Drochia District)
83. Petreni (Drochia District)
84. Popeștii de Sus (Drochia District)
85. Șuri (Drochia District)
86. Zgurița (Drochia District)
87. Soroca (Soroca District) – 6 February 2018. Declaration signed by the majority of local councillors.
88. Băxani (Soroca District)
89. Bulboci (Soroca District)
90. Căinarii Vechi (Soroca District)
91. Cosăuți (Soroca District) – 19 February 2018. Declaration and formal decision signed by the majority of local councillors.
92. Cremenciug (Soroca District) – 19 February 2018. Declaration and formal decision signed by the majority of local councillors.
93. Dărcăuți (Soroca District)
94. Egoreni (Soroca District)
95. Holoșnița (Soroca District)
96. Hristici (Soroca District) – 6 or 7 February 2018. Declaration signed by the mayor and by the majority of local councillors.
97. Iarova (Soroca District)
98. Nimereuca (Soroca District) – 12 February 2018. Declaration and formal decision signed by the majority of local councillors.
99. Oclanda (Soroca District)
100. Ocolina (Soroca District)
101. Pîrlița (Soroca District)
102. Regina Maria (Soroca District)
103. Rublenița (Soroca District)
104. Rudi (Soroca District)
105. Schineni (Soroca District)
106. Șeptelici (Soroca District)
107. Stoicani (Soroca District)
108. Tătărăuca Veche (Soroca District)
109. Vădeni (Soroca District)
110. Vărăncău (Soroca District)
111. Vasilcău (Soroca District)
112. Zastînca (Soroca District)
113. Glodeni (Glodeni District)
114. Balatina (Glodeni District)
115. Danu (Glodeni District)
116. Fundurii Noi (Glodeni District)
117. Iabloana (Glodeni District) – 6 or 7 February 2018. Declaration signed by the mayor and by the majority of local councillors.
118. Limbenii Noi (Glodeni District)
119. Sturzovca (Glodeni District)
120. Viișoara (Glodeni District)
121. Municipality of Bălți
122. Vatra (Municipality of Chișinău)
123. Vadul lui Vodă (Municipality of Chișinău)
124. Florești (Florești District) – 19 February 2018. Declaration signed by the mayor and by the majority of local councillors.
125. Mărculești (Florești District)
126. Alexeevca (Florești District) – 12 February 2018. Declaration signed by the mayor and by the Local Council of Alexeevca, also formal decision signed by the Local Council of Alexeevca.
127. Băhrinești (Florești District)
128. Cașunca (Florești District)
129. Ghindești (Florești District) – 12 February 2018. Declaration signed by the majority of local councillors.
130. Cunicea (Florești District)
131. Frumușica (Florești District)
132. Gura Căinarului (Florești District) – 19 February 2018. Declaration signed by the majority of local councillors.
133. Gura Camencii (Florești District) – 12 February 2018. Declaration signed by the majority of local councillors.
134. Iliciovca (Florești District) – 12 February 2018. Formal decision signed by the majority of local councillors.
135. Nicolaevca (Florești District)
136. Prodănești (Florești District)
137. Rădulenii Vechi (Florești District) – 19 February 2018. Declaration signed by the majority of local councillors.
138. Ștefănești (Florești District)
139. Trifănești (Florești District)
140. Vărvăreuca (Florești District) – 19 February 2018. Declaration signed by the majority of local councillors.
141. Ciolacu Nou (Fălești District) – 6 or 7 February 2018. Declaration and formal decision signed by the majority of local councillors.
142. Egorovca (Fălești District) – 6 or 7 February 2018. Declaration and formal decision signed by the majority of local councillors.
143. Făleștii Noi (Fălești District)
144. Hiliuți (Fălești District)
145. Hîncești (Fălești District) – 19 February 2018. Declaration and formal decision signed by the majority of local councillors.
146. Logofteni (Fălești District) – 6 or 7 February 2018. Declaration and formal decision signed by the mayor and by the majority of local councillors.
147. Mărăndeni (Fălești District)
148. Natalievca (Fălești District)
149. Obreja Veche (Fălești District)
150. Pompa (Fălești District)
151. Pruteni (Fălești District)
152. Scumpia (Fălești District)
153. Taxobeni (Fălești District)
154. Sîngerei (Sîngerei District)
155. Bilicenii Noi (Sîngerei District) – 6 February 2018. Formal decision signed by the mayor and by the majority of local councillors.
156. Dobrogea Veche (Sîngerei District)
157. Grigorăuca (Sîngerei District) – 19 February 2018. Formal decision signed by the majority of local councillors.
158. Prepelița (Sîngerei District) – 6 or 7 February 2018. Formal decision signed by the mayor and by the majority of local councillors.
159. Țambula (Sîngerei District) – 6 or 7 February 2018. Formal decision signed by the mayor and by the majority of local councillors.
160. Tăura Veche (Sîngerei District) – 12 February 2018. Formal decision signed by the majority of local councillors.
161. Șoldănești (Șoldănești District)
162. Alcedar (Șoldănești District)
163. Chipeșca (Șoldănești District) – 6 or 7 February 2018. Declaration signed by the majority of local councillors.
164. Cobîlea (Șoldănești District) – 12 February 2018. Declaration signed by the majority of local councillors.
165. Dobrușa (Șoldănești District)
166. Fuzăuca (Șoldănești District)
167. Găuzeni (Șoldănești District)
168. Glinjeni (Șoldănești District) – 12 February 2018. Declaration signed by the majority of local councillors.
169. Olișcani (Șoldănești District)
170. Poiana (Șoldănești District)
171. Rogojeni (Șoldănești District)
172. Sămășcani (Șoldănești District)
173. Vadul-Rașcov (Șoldănești District) – 6 or 7 February 2018. Declaration signed by the majority of local councillors.
174. Anenii Noi (Anenii Noi District) – 6 or 7 February 2018. Declaration and formal decision signed by the majority of local councillors.
175. Bulboaca (Anenii Noi District)
176. Ciobanovca (Anenii Noi District) – 6 or 7 February 2018. Declaration and formal decision signed by the majority of local councillors.
177. Floreni (Anenii Noi District) – A declaration of unification with Romania was also emitted in the locality.
178. Gura Bîcului (Anenii Noi District)
179. Maximovca (Anenii Noi District)
180. Ochiul Roș (Anenii Noi District) – 6 or 7 February 2018. Declaration and formal decision signed by the mayor and by the majority of local councillors.
181. Speia (Anenii Noi District)
182. Zolotievca (Anenii Noi District) – 6 or 7 February 2018. Declaration and formal decision signed by the mayor and by the majority of local councillors.
183. Costești (Ialoveni District) – A declaration of unification with Romania was also emitted in the locality.
184. Bucovăț (Strășeni District) – 12 February 2018. Declaration signed by the majority of local councillors.
185. Căpriana (Strășeni District) – A declaration of unification with Romania was also emitted in the locality.
186. Cojușna (Strășeni District) – A declaration of unification with Romania was also emitted in the locality.
187. Romănești (Strășeni District)
188. Bălțata (Criuleni District)
189. Dolinnoe (Criuleni District)
190. Cocieri (Dubăsari District)
191. Corjova (Dubăsari District)
192. Coșnița (Dubăsari District)
193. Doroțcaia (Dubăsari District)
194. Molovata Nouă (Dubăsari District)
195. Pîrîta (Dubăsari District)
196. Ungheni (Ungheni District) – A declaration of unification with Romania was also emitted in the locality.
197. Agronomovca (Ungheni District) – 6 or 7 February 2018. Declaration and formal decision signed by the mayor and by the majority of local councillors.
198. Cioropcani (Ungheni District)
199. Măcărești (Ungheni District)
200. Pîrlița (Ungheni District)
201. Teșcureni (Ungheni District)
202. Zagarancea (Ungheni District)
203. Sadova (Călărași District) – 6 February 2018. Sadova was the first Moldovan locality where a declaration in favor of Moldovan statehood and against unification with Romania was adopted. 8 out of the 13 local councillors of the commune signed such a declaration. The act took place without a formal meeting of the Local Council of Sadova and while mayor Vladimir Susarenco was out of the commune. Sadova later also signed a declaration of union with Romania on 10 March 2018, this time with the presence of Susarenco.
204. Buda (Călărași District) – A declaration of unification with Romania was also emitted in the locality.
205. Căbăiești (Călărași District)
206. Hîrjauca (Călărași District) – 6 February 2018. Declaration signed by the mayor and by the majority of local councillors.
207. Horodiște (Călărași District) – A declaration of unification with Romania was also emitted in the locality.
208. Răciula (Călărași District) – A declaration of unification with Romania was also emitted in the locality.
209. Vărzăreștii Noi (Călărași District)
210. Bulăiești (Orhei District)
211. Ivancea (Orhei District)
212. Mîrzești (Orhei District)
213. Sămănanca (Orhei District)
214. Bursuc (Nisporeni District)
215. Marinici (Nisporeni District) – A declaration of unification with Romania was also emitted in the locality.
216. Onești (Hîncești District) – 6 or 7 February 2018. Declaration signed by the mayor and by the majority of local councillors.
217. Cinișeuți (Rezina District)
218. Păpăuți (Rezina District)
219. Albota de Sus (Taraclia District)
220. Budăi (Taraclia District)
221. Cairaclia (Taraclia District)
222. Cealîc (Taraclia District)
223. Corten (Taraclia District)
224. Novosiolovca (Taraclia District)
225. Salcia (Taraclia District)
226. Valea Perjei (Taraclia District)
227. Vinogradovca (Taraclia District)
228. Alexanderfeld (Cahul District)
229. Alexandru Ioan Cuza (Cahul District) – A declaration of unification with Romania was also emitted in the locality.
230. Andrușul de Jos (Cahul District)
231. Borceag (Cahul District)
232. Burlăceni (Cahul District)
233. Doina (Cahul District) – 6 February 2018. Declaration and formal decision signed by the mayor and by the majority of local councillors.
234. Huluboaia (Cahul District) – 6 February 2018. Declaration and formal decision signed by the mayor and by the majority of local councillors.
235. Iujnoe (Cahul District)
236. Lebedenco (Cahul District)
237. Lopățica (Cahul District) – 6 or 7 February 2018. Declaration and formal decision signed by the mayor and by all local councillors.
238. Lucești (Cahul District) – 6 or 7 February 2018. Declaration and formal decision signed by the majority of local councillors.
239. Moscovei (Cahul District) – 6 or 7 February 2018. Declaration and formal decision signed by the majority of local councillors.
240. Basarabeasca (Basarabeasca District)
241. Iserlia (Basarabeasca District)
242. Ecaterinovca (Cimișlia District)
243. Troițcoe (Cimișlia District)
244. Valea Perjei (Cimișlia District)
245. Cneazevca (Leova District) – 6 or 7 February 2018. Declaration and formal decision signed by the majority of local councillors.
246. Colibabovca (Leova District)
247. Iargara (Leova District)
248. Sărăteni (Leova District) – A declaration of unification with Romania was also emitted in the locality.
249. Sîrma (Leova District) – A declaration of unification with Romania was also emitted in the locality.
250. Tomai (Leova District)
251. Tomaiul Nou (Leova District)
252. Vozneseni (Leova District)
253. Căinari (Căușeni District)
254. Chircăieștii Noi (Căușeni District)
255. Copanca (Căușeni District) – 12 February 2018. Formal decision signed by the majority of local councillors.
256. Grădinița (Căușeni District)
257. Grigorievca (Căușeni District)
258. Pervomaisc (Căușeni District)
259. Tănătarii Noi (Căușeni District)
260. Ștefan Voda (Ștefan Voda District) – 19 February 2018. Declaration and formal decision signed by the mayor and by the majority of local councillors.
261. Alava (Ștefan Voda District)
262. Brezoaia (Ștefan Vodă District) – 6 or 7 February 2018. Declaration and formal decision signed by the mayor and by the majority of local councillors.
263. Căplani (Ștefan Voda District)
264. Cioburciu (Ștefan Voda District)
265. Olănești (Ștefan Voda District)
266. Răscăieți (Ștefan Voda District)
267. Semionovca (Ștefan Vodă District) – 6 or 7 February 2018. Declaration and formal decision signed by the mayor and by the majority of local councillors.
268. Talmaza (Ștefan Voda District)
269. Tudora (Ștefan Voda District)
270. Cantemir (Cantemir District)
271. Cîietu (Cantemir District)
272. Ciobalaccia (Cantemir District)
273. Cîșla (Cantemir District)
274. Enichioi (Cantemir District)
275. Sadîc (Cantemir District)
276. Stoianovca (Cantemir District) – 19 February 2018. Declaration signed by the majority of local councillors.
277. Comrat (Gagauzia)
278. Avdarma (Gagauzia)
279. Beșalma (Gagauzia)
280. Bugeac (Gagauzia)
281. Chioselia Rusă (Gagauzia)
282. Chirsova (Gagauzia)
283. Cioc-Maidan (Gagauzia) – 6 or 7 February 2018. Formal decision signed by the Local Council of Cioc-Maidan.
284. Congaz (Gagauzia) – 6 or 7 February 2018. Formal decision signed by the mayor and by the majority of local councillors.
285. Congazcicul de Sus (Gagauzia)
286. Cotovscoe (Gagauzia) – 19 February 2018. Declaration and formal decision signed by the mayor and by the Local Council of Cotovscoe.
287. Dezghingea (Gagauzia)
288. Ferapontievca (Gagauzia) – 6 or 7 February 2018. Declaration and formal decision signed by the majority of local councillors.
289. Svetlîi (Gagauzia) – 6 or 7 February 2018. Declaration and formal decision signed by the majority of local councillors.
290. Ceadîr-Lunga (Gagauzia)
291. Baurci (Gagauzia)
292. Cazaclia (Gagauzia)
293. Chiriet-Lunga (Gagauzia)
294. Copceac (Gagauzia)
295. Gaidar (Gagauzia)
296. Joltai (Gagauzia)
297. Tomai (Gagauzia)
298. Vulcănești (Gagauzia) – 12 February 2018. Declaration signed by the Local Council of Vulcănești.
299. Carbalia (Gagauzia)
300. Cișmichioi (Gagauzia)
301. Etulia (Gagauzia)
302. Cotul Morii (Hîncești District) – 6 February 2018. Cotul Morii only appeared in Ceban's 6 February list and was not included in the PSRM's later lists.

Additionally, one district of Moldova adopted a declaration against unification with Romania. The PSRM included it on its lists as a locality.

1. Ocnița District – Adopted by the District Council of Ocnița.

=== In Romania ===
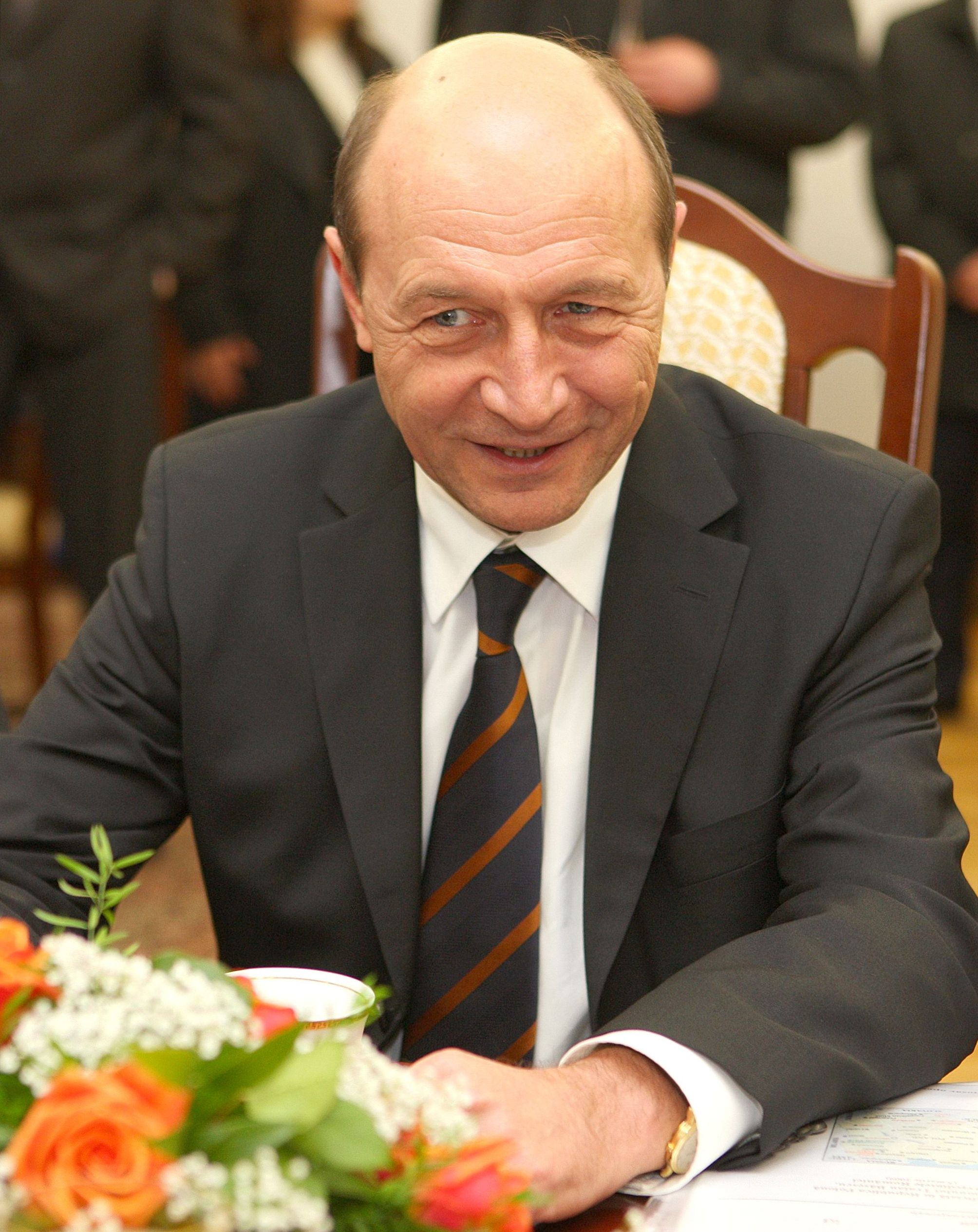
Traian Băsescu, former President of Romania, in 2009. As of 2018, Băsescu was one of the main figures campaigning for unification between Moldova and Romania.

The unification declarations in Moldova provoked similar responses in Romania, where counties, cities and communes, but also schools, parishes and members of the Romanian diaspora, among others, took similar measures. Some Romanian figures also commented on these events. For instance, Teodor Meleșcanu, then the Minister of Foreign Affairs of Romania, stated that, from his point of view, all these unification declarations were the expression of the wishes of those localities that issued them to have a closer relationship with Romania but that they had no legal value, that they were symbolic and that they did not affect Romania's relations with Moldova in any way. Traian Băsescu, former President of Romania and then leader of the PMP, wrote on Facebook that "the Union has begun!", published a list of all 34 Moldovan localities that had declared unification with Romania at the time and urged the President of Romania, the Prime Minister of Romania and the Parliament of Romania to act based on this. Băsescu later said on an interview that he supported a union project with Moldova that would not include Transnistria and with an enlarged Romania being part of the European Union and NATO.

At the end of a meeting with Romanian activists for unification with Moldova (including George Simion) and a delegation of Moldovan mayors and councillors, Ludovic Orban, then president of the PNL of Romania, said that the party supported unification, that "I am convinced that Romania is ready for this unification" and that as soon as there is "a willingness expressed in the Republic of Moldova" to unite with Romania, the latter will be in readiness for it. Simion, organizer of a multitude of initiatives for the unification of Moldova and Romania, said he was satisfied with the scale that the unification declaractions had reached and with the general enthusiasm of many Moldovan mayors, who "continue to show pride in being part of the Romanian nation". Once March 2018 started, Simion encouraged local councils, schools and other entities to sign declarations of unification with Romania, as March was the month in which Bessarabia united with Romania in 1918.

The then Moldovan ambassador to Romania, Mihai Gribincea, also commented on the unification declarations during an interview. Gribincea said that these declarations, while only symbolic, showed "a new current in Moldovan society" and that support for unification with Romania was gaining strength in Moldova. He also stated that these actions may indicate a feeling of tiredness from Moldovan citizens in the face of the "situation of uncertainty in which they find themselves" and a desire for better conditions and standards of living.

== Aftermath ==
AGIRo continued to incite Romanian schools to issue declarations of unification with Moldova and in support of the minority rights of the Romanian diaspora and of ethnicities related to the Romanians in 2019.
