= Onești (disambiguation) =

Oneşti is a city in Bacău County, Romania.

Oneşti may also refer to:

- Oneşti, Hînceşti, a commune in Hînceşti district, Moldova
- Oneşti, Străşeni, a commune in Străşeni district, Moldova
- Oneşti, a village in Plugari Commune, Iaşi County, Romania
- Oneşti, a village in Zăbriceni Commune, Edineţ district, Moldova
