= Tătărești, Strășeni =

Tătărești
- Village
- Location within Moldova
- Coordinates: 47.2052777778°N 28.5380555556°E
- Country: Moldova
- District: Strășeni District

Government
  - Mayor: Elena Platița (PL)

Population (2014 census)
  - Total: 1,432
- Time zone: UTC+2 (EET)
  - Summer (DST): UTC+3 (EEST)

Tătărești is a village in Strășeni District, Moldova.
