= Fuzăuca =

- Village
- Location within Moldova
- Coordinates: 47°44′N 28°45′E
- Country: Moldova
- District: Șoldănești District

Government
  - Mayor: Sava Tcaci (PSRM)

Population (2014 census)
  - Total: 719
- Time zone: UTC+2 (EET)
  - Summer (DST): UTC+3 (EEST)

Fuzăuca is a village in Șoldănești District, Moldova.

== Demographics ==
According to the 2014 Moldovan census, Fuzăuca had a population of 719 residents. All inhabitants lived in a rural setting, resulting in a population density of approximately 40.85 people per square kilometer across the village’s 17.60 km² area. Between 2004 and 2014, the population saw a slight annual decrease of 1.3%, indicating a gradual demographic decline.

The gender distribution was fairly balanced, with women representing a slight majority at 52% (374 individuals) compared to men at 48% (345 individuals). In terms of age structure, the working-age population (15–64 years) accounted for 67.9% (488 people), while children under 15 made up 19.7% (142 people). Seniors aged 65 and older represented 12.4% (89 people), suggesting a modest aging trend within the community.

Ethnically, Fuzăuca is notably diverse. Ukrainians comprised the majority at 51.1% (362 residents), followed closely by Moldovans at 46.9% (332 residents). A small minority of 2% (14 individuals) identified as Russians. This diversity is reflected in the village's linguistic makeup: 48.7% of the population reported Ukrainian as their native language, 33.9% Moldovan, 9.4% Romanian, and 8% Russian.

Despite its ethnic and linguistic variety, Fuzăuca is religiously homogeneous, with 100% of the population identified as Orthodox in the census.

Overall, Fuzăuca's demographic profile paints a picture of a small, multiethnic rural village with a slightly declining and aging population, strong Orthodox religious cohesion, and a significant Ukrainian cultural presence.

== Administration and local government ==
Fuzăuca is governed by a local council composed of nine members. The most recent local elections, in November 2023, resulted in the composition of all 9 councillors from the Party of Socialists of the Republic of Moldova. In the same elections, the candidate from the Party of Socialists of the Republic of Moldova, Sava Tcaci, was elected as mayor winning all 100% of the vote.
