= Bolohan =

Village in Moldova

- Commune and village
- Location in Moldova
- Coordinates: 47°26′N 28°52′E
- Country: Moldova
- District: Orhei District
- Elevation: 331 ft (101 m)

Population (2014 census)
  - Total: 1,380
- Time zone: UTC+2 (EET)
  - Summer (DST): UTC+3 (EEST)
- Postal code: MD-3513
- Area code: +373 235

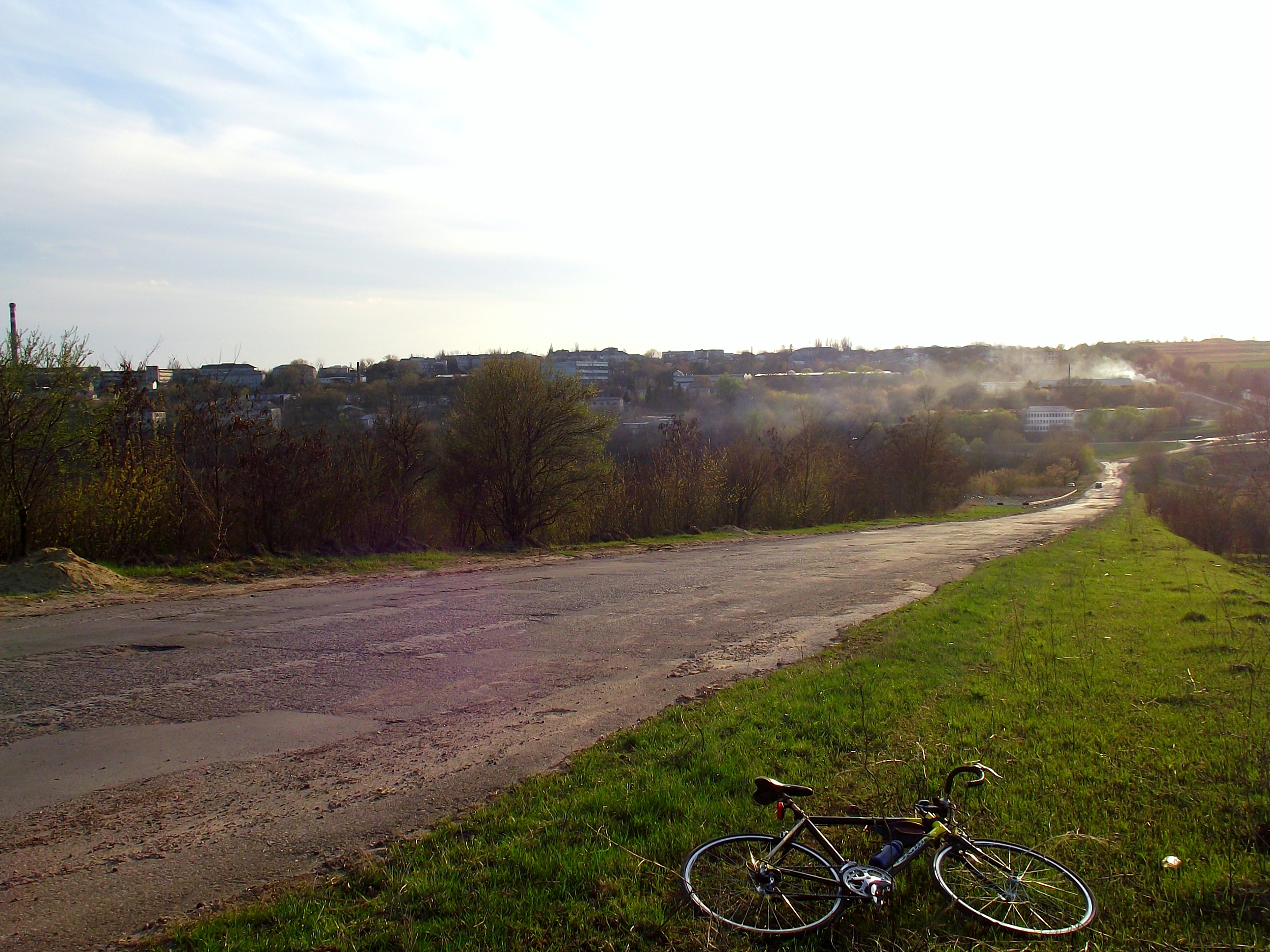
Bologan

Bolohan is a village in Orhei District, Moldova. According to the 2014 census, 1,380 people lived in the village.

== Notable people ==
- Igor Moroz, a protester in the post-election riots in Chișinău who died while in police custody
