= Hancăuți =

- Village
- Location within Edineț
- Coordinates: 48°2′52″N 27°11′22″E
- Country: Moldova
- District: Edineț District

Government
  - Mayor: Anatolie Bobuțac (PLDM)
- Elevation: 194 m (636 ft)

Population (2014 census)
  - Total: 990
- Time zone: UTC+2 (EET)
  - Summer (DST): UTC+3 (EEST)
- Postal code: MD-4632

Hancăuți is a village in Edineț District, Moldova.
