= Semionovca =

Semionovca Семёновка (Russian) Семенівка (Ukrainian)
- Village
- Location within Moldova
- Coordinates: 46°31′00″N 29°30′44″E
- Country: Moldova
- District: Ștefan Vodă District

Government
  - Mayor: Zinovia Zolotuhina (Independent)

Area
  - Total: 31.98 km^{2} (12.35 sq mi)
- Elevation: 99 m (325 ft)

Population (2014 census)
  - Total: 669
- Time zone: UTC+2 (EET)
  - Summer (DST): UTC+3 (EEST)
- Postal code: MD-4232

Semionovca is a village in Ștefan Vodă District, Moldova.
