= Valea Perjei, Cimișlia =

Valea Perjei
- Village
- Location within Moldova
- Coordinates: 46.6211111111°N 28.7225°E
- Country: Moldova
- District: Cimișlia District

Government
  - Mayor: Alexandru Plamadeala (Independent)

Population (2014 census)
  - Total: 670
- Time zone: UTC+2 (EET)
  - Summer (DST): UTC+3 (EEST)

Valea Perjei is a village in Cimișlia District, Moldova.
