= Cașunca =

- Village
- Location within Moldova
- Coordinates: 47°47′12″N 28°23′39″E
- Country: Moldova

Government
  - Mayor: Paulina Ciupac (PCRM)

Area
  - Total: 25 km^{2} (9.7 sq mi)
- Elevation: 125 m (410 ft)

Population (2014 census)
  - Total: 1,764
- Time zone: UTC+2 (EET)
  - Summer (DST): UTC+3 (EEST)
- Postal code: MD-5013

Cașunca is a village in Florești District, Moldova.
