= Șeptelici =

- Village
- Location within Moldova
- Country: Moldova

Government
  - Mayor: Victoria Andriuța (PLDM)

Population (2014 census)
  - Total: 962
- Time zone: UTC+2 (EET)
  - Summer (DST): UTC+3 (EEST)
- Postal code: MD-3042

Șeptelici is a village in Soroca District, Moldova.
