= Morozeni =

- Commune
- Location in Moldova
- Coordinates: 47°22′37″N 28°38′05″E
- Country: Moldova
- District: Orhei District

Population (2014)
  - Total: 1,739
- Time zone: UTC+2 (EET)
  - Summer (DST): UTC+3 (EEST)

Morozeni is a commune in Orhei District, Moldova. It is composed of two villages, Breanova and Morozeni.
