= Feștelița =

Feștelița Фештелица (Russian) Фештеліца (Ukrainian)
- Village
- Location within Moldova
- Coordinates: 46°32′40″N 29°33′56″E
- Country: Moldova
- District: Ștefan Vodă District

Government
  - Mayor: Nicolae Tudoreanu (PDM)

Area
  - Total: 30.31 km^{2} (11.70 sq mi)
- Elevation: 120 m (390 ft)

Population (2014 census)
  - Total: 2,946
- Time zone: UTC+2 (EET)
  - Summer (DST): UTC+3 (EEST)
- Postal code: MD-4220

Feștelița is a village in Ștefan Vodă District, Moldova.
