= Domulgeni =

- Village
- Location within Moldova
- Coordinates: 47.7913888889°N 28.4369444444°E
- Country: Moldova
- District: Florești District

Government
  - Mayor: Vasile Tîltu (PLDM)

Population (2014 census)
  - Total: 1,328
- Time zone: UTC+2 (EET)
  - Summer (DST): UTC+3 (EEST)

Domulgeni is a village in Florești District, Moldova.
