= Hristici =

- Commune and village
- Location in Moldova
- Coordinates: 48°07′N 28°11′E
- Country: Moldova
- District: Soroca District

Population (2014 census)
  - Total: 1,105
- Time zone: UTC+2 (EET)
  - Summer (DST): UTC+3 (EEST)

Hristici is a village in Soroca District, Moldova.

== Notable people ==
- Gheorghe Năstase
