= Sauca, Ocnița =

Sauca
- Village
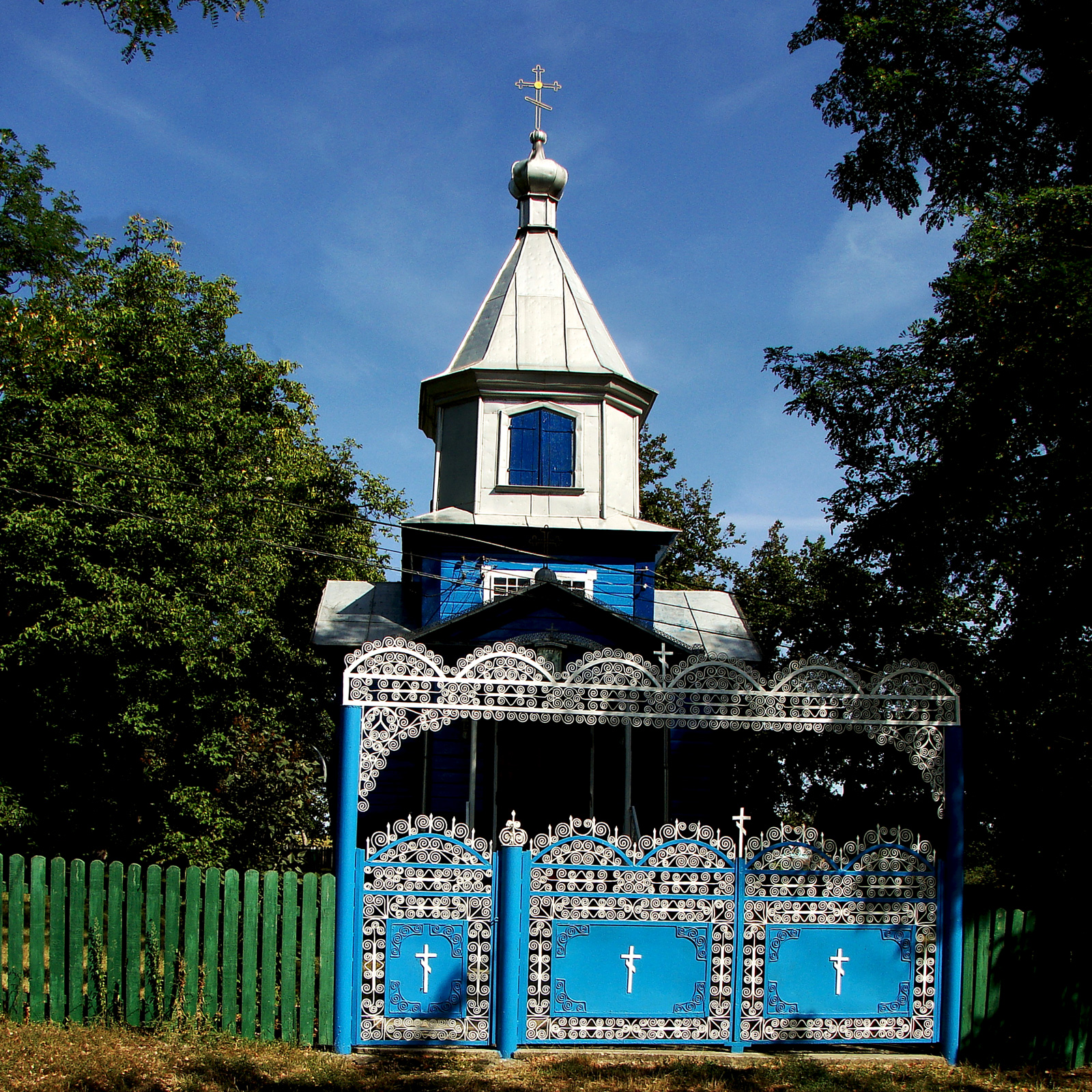

- Location within Moldova
- Coordinates: 48.3775°N 27.7255555556°E
- Country: Moldova
- District: Ocnița

Government
  - Mayor: Iraida Jitari (PDM)
- Elevation: 225 m (738 ft)

Population (2014 census)
  - Total: 1,626
- Time zone: UTC+2 (EET)
  - Summer (DST): UTC+3 (EEST)

Sauca is a village in Ocnița District, Moldova.
