= Măgurele, Ungheni =

Măgurele
- Village
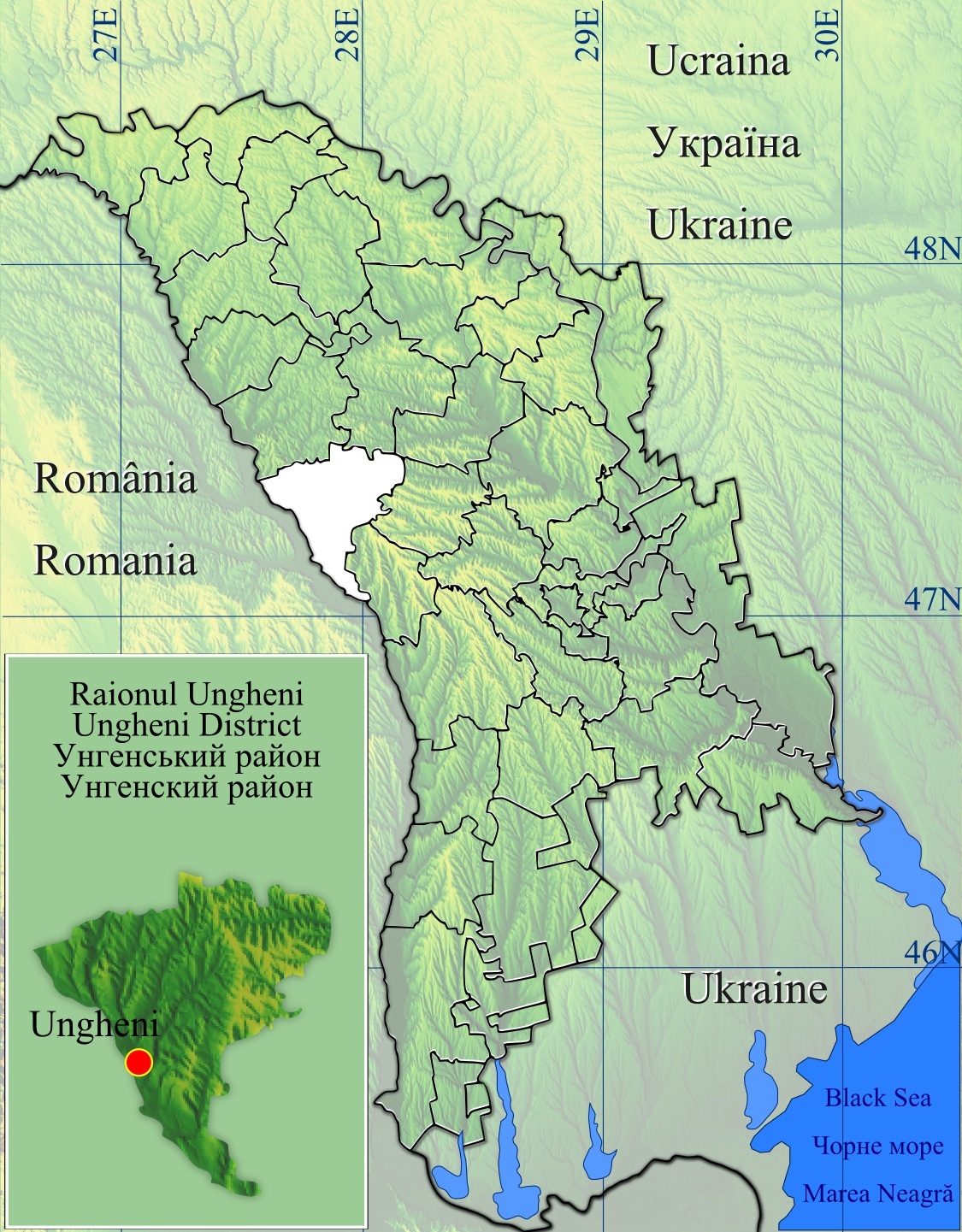
- Location within Ungheni
- Coordinates: 47°27′37″N 27°58′4″E
- Country: Moldova
- District: Ungheni District

Government
  - Mayor: Sergiu Bodrug (BEPPEM)

Population (2014 census)
  - Total: 2,247
- Time zone: UTC+2 (EET)
  - Summer (DST): UTC+3 (EEST)
- Postal code: MD-3633

Măgurele is a village in Ungheni District, Moldova.
