= Căplani =

Căplani Капланы (Russian) Кеплань (Ukrainian)
- Village
- Location within Moldova
- Coordinates: 46°23′16″N 29°52′17″E
- Country: Moldova

Government
  - Mayor: Valeriu Tabunșcic (PLDM)

Area
  - Total: 53.11 km^{2} (20.51 sq mi)
- Elevation: 77 m (253 ft)

Population (2014 census)
  - Total: 3,291
- Time zone: UTC+2 (EET)
  - Summer (DST): UTC+3 (EEST)
- Postal code: MD-4215

Căplani is a village in Ștefan Vodă District, Moldova.
