= Lopățica =

- Village
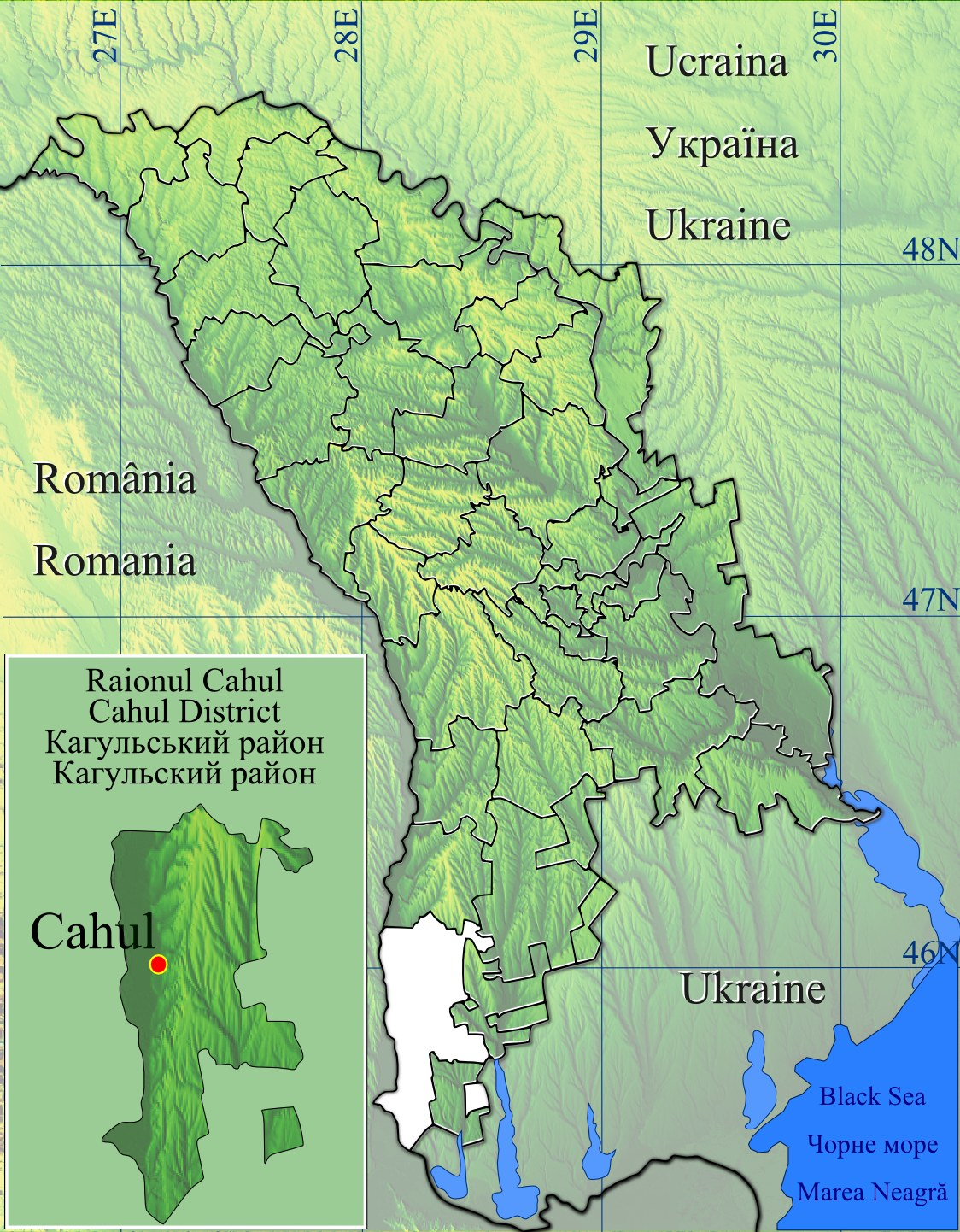
- Location within Cahul
- Coordinates: 45°55′53″N 28°24′42″E
- Country: Moldova
- District: Cahul District

Government
  - Mayor: Valeri Stoianov (PN)

Population (2014 census)
  - Total: 573
- Time zone: UTC+2 (EET)
  - Summer (DST): UTC+3 (EEST)
- Postal code: MD-3923

Lopățica is a village in Cahul District, Moldova.
