= Bîrnova =

- Village
- Location within Moldova
- Coordinates: 48°25′26″N 27°31′36″E
- Country: Moldova
- District: Ocnița

Government
  - Mayor: Valeriu Scutelnic (PCRM)

Population (2014 census)
  - Total: 2,310
- Time zone: UTC+2 (EET)
  - Summer (DST): UTC+3 (EEST)
- Website: www.primaria.md

Bîrnova is a village in Ocnița District, Moldova. It has a population of 2432 inhabitants.
