= Borceag =

- Village
- Location within Moldova
- Coordinates: 46°3′6″N 28°31′31″E
- Country: Moldova
- District: Cahul District

Population (2014 census)
  - Total: 1,293
- Postal code: MD-7415

Borceag is a village in Cahul District, Moldova.
