= Călimănești, Nisporeni =

Călimânești
- Village
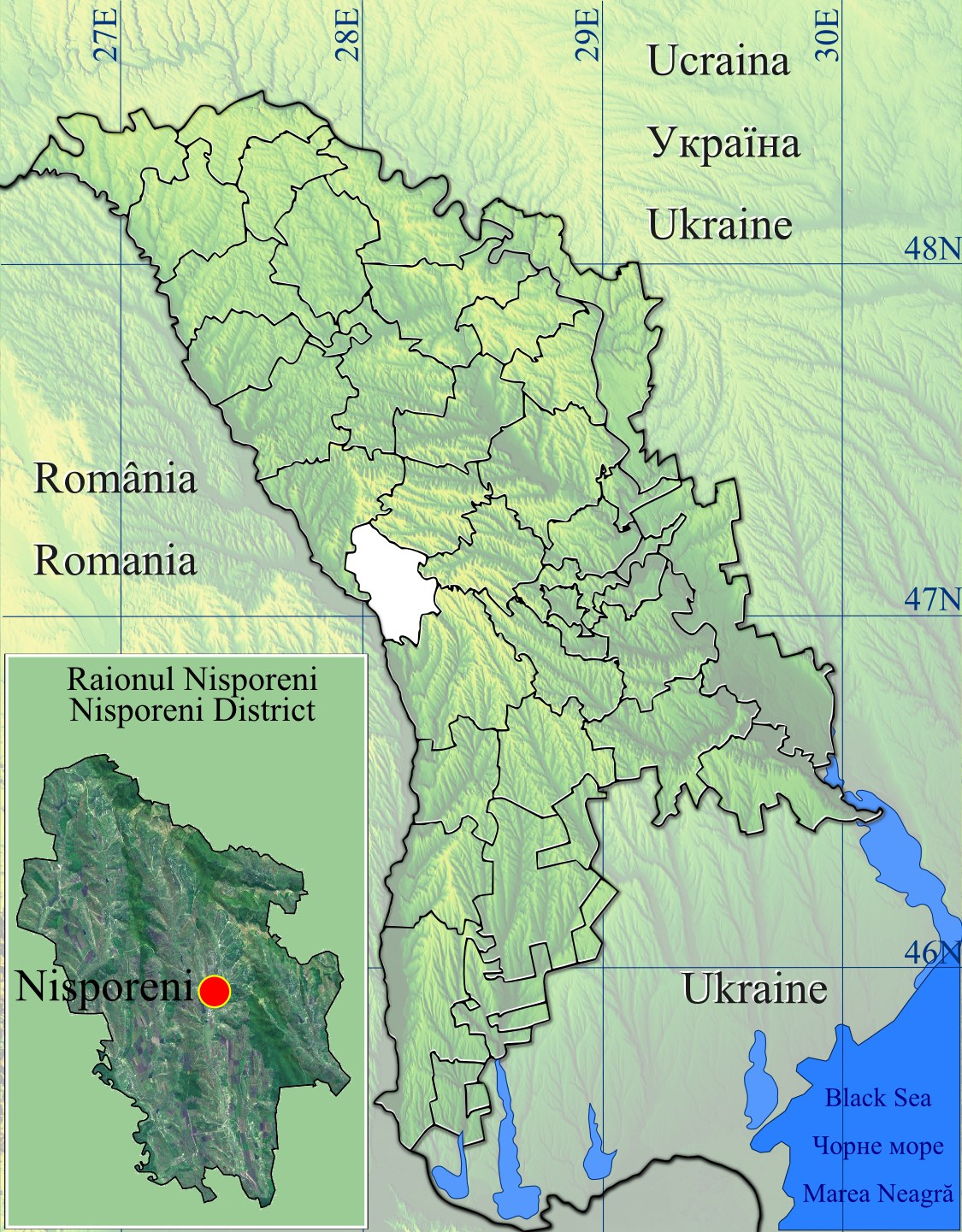
- Location within Nisporeni
- Coordinates: 46°56′35″N 28°11′16″E
- Country: Moldova

Government
  - Mayor: Simion Cornescu (PLDM)
- Elevation: 86 m (282 ft)

Population (2014 census)
  - Total: 819
- Time zone: UTC+2 (EET)
  - Summer (DST): UTC+3 (EEST)
- Postal code: MD-6419

Călimănești is a village in Nisporeni District, Moldova.
