= Andrușul de Jos =

- Village
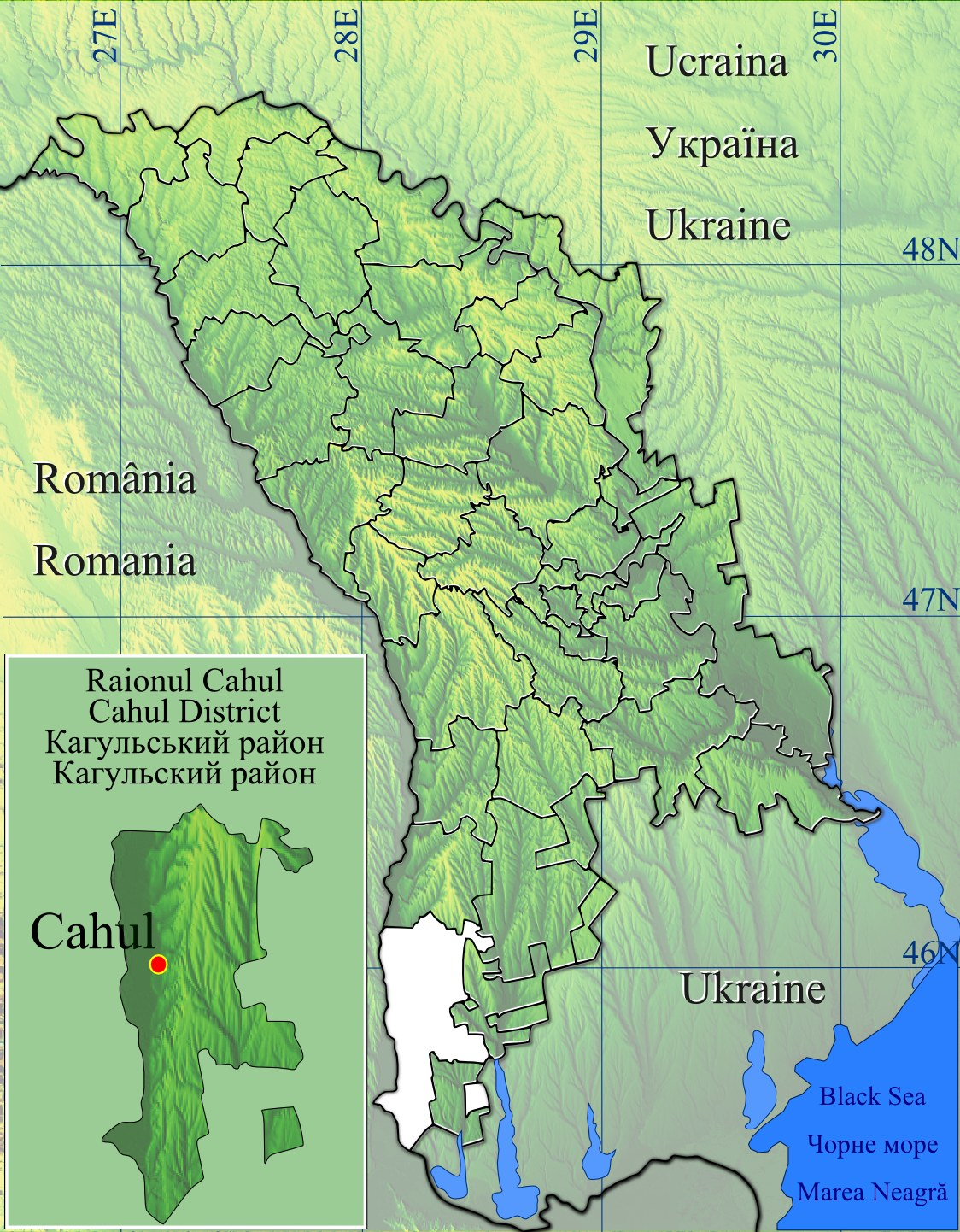
- Location of village within Moldova
- Coordinates: 45°59′9″N 28°13′16″E
- Country: Moldova
- District: Cahul District
- Elevation: 160 ft (50 m)

Population (2014 census)
  - Total: 2,278
- Time zone: UTC+2 (EET)
  - Summer (DST): UTC+3 (EEST)

Andrușul de Jos is a village in Cahul District, Moldova, about 60 km (37 mi) to the north of Galați.

== Demographics ==
According to the 2004 Moldovan Census, Andrușul de Jos has 2,125 inhabitants.
