= Țambula =

- Commune
- Interactive map of Țambula
- Country: Moldova
- District: Sîngerei District

Population (2014)
  - Total: 1,552
- Time zone: UTC+2 (EET)
  - Summer (DST): UTC+3 (EEST)
- Postal code: MD-6241

Țambula is a commune in Sîngerei District, Moldova. It is composed of three villages: Octeabriscoe, Pălăria and Țambula.
