= Romanovca =

- Village
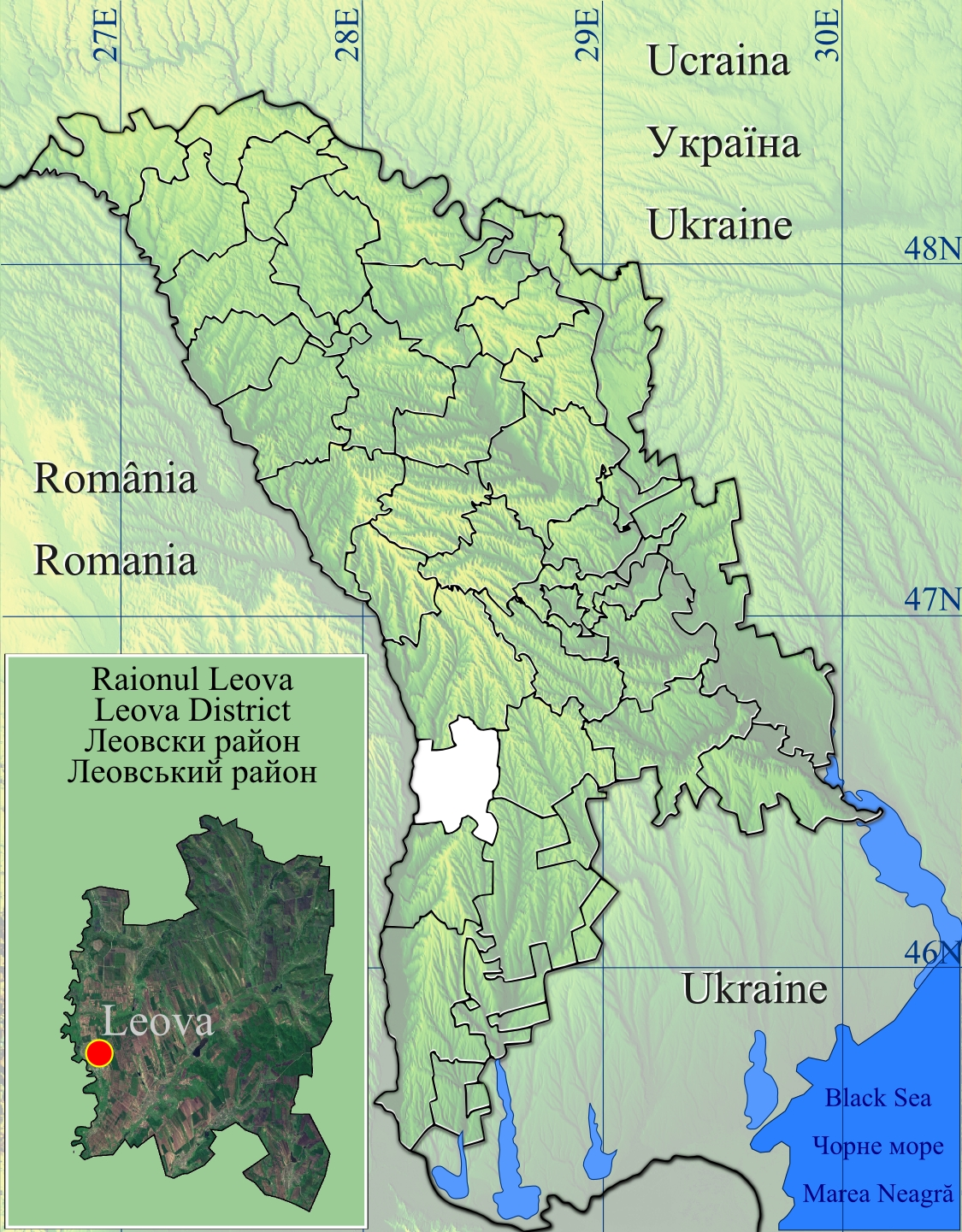
- Location within Moldova Leova
- Coordinates: 46°27′34″N 28°21′4″E
- Country: Moldova
- District: Leova District

Government
  - Primar: Indira Zaharia-Lavric (PL)

Area
  - Total: 800 km^{2} (310 sq mi)
- Elevation: 39 m (128 ft)

Population (2014 census)
  - Total: 99,986
- Time zone: UTC+2 (EET)
  - Summer (DST): UTC+3 (EEST)
- Postal code: MD-6319

Romanovca is a village in Leova District, Moldova.
