= Aluniș, Rîșcani =

Aluniș
- Village
- Location within Moldova
- Coordinates: 47.85°N 27.65°E
- Country: Moldova
- District: Rîșcani

Government
  - Mayor: Ion Vacariuc (PLDM)

Population (2014 census)
  - Total: 1,700
- Time zone: UTC+2 (EET)
  - Summer (DST): UTC+3 (EEST)

Aluniș is a village in Rîșcani District, Moldova.
