= Bulăiești =

- Village
- Location in Moldova
- Coordinates: 47°28′35″N 28°58′43″E
- Country: Moldova
- District: Orhei District

Population (2014 census)
  - Total: 1,318
- Time zone: UTC+2 (EET)
  - Summer (DST): UTC+3 (EEST)

Bulăiești is a commune and village in Orhei District, Moldova.
