= Cinișeuți =

- Village
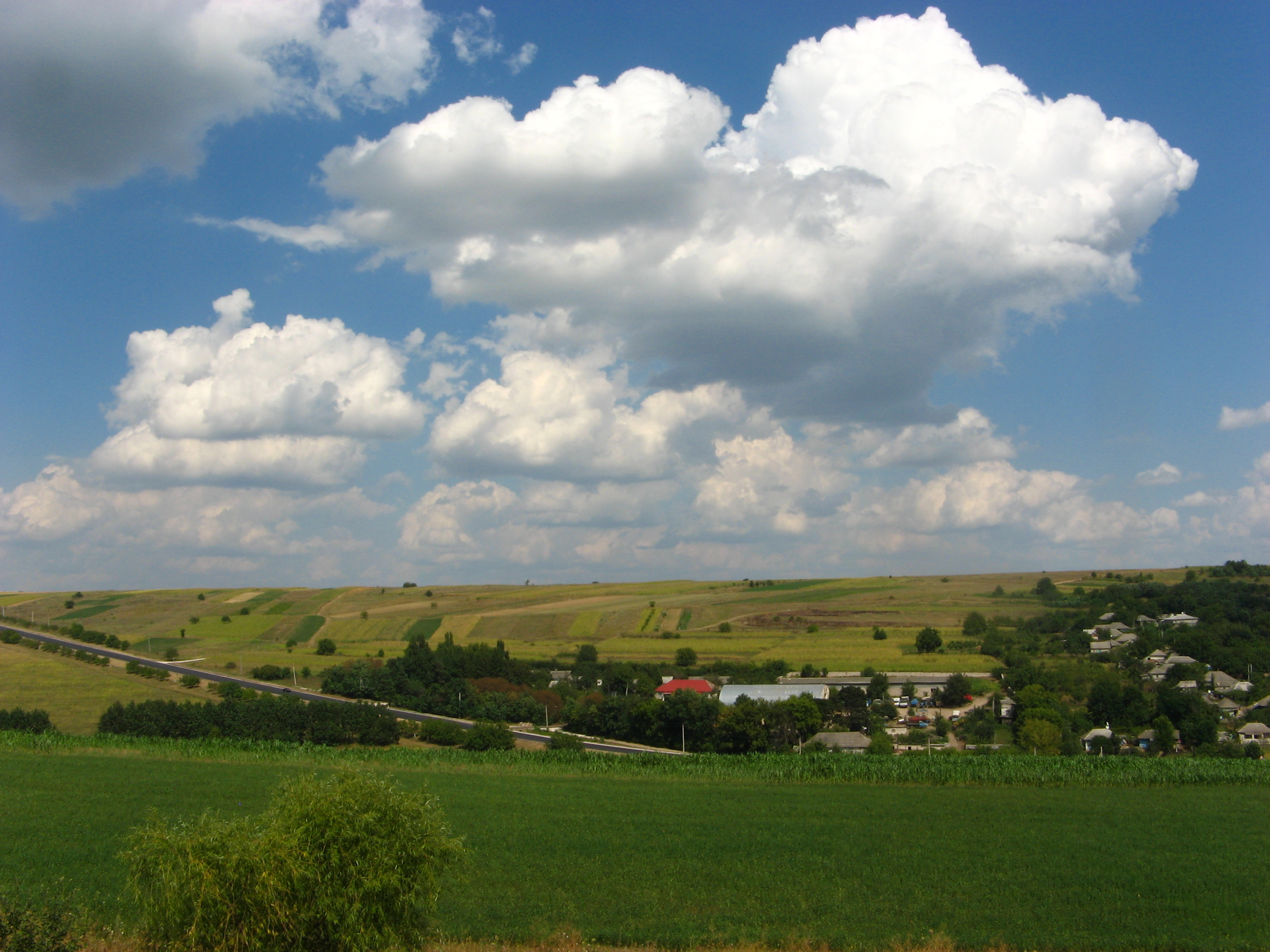

- Location within Moldova
- Country: Moldova
- District: Rezina District

Population (2014 census)
  - Total: 2,537
- Time zone: UTC+2 (EET)
  - Summer (DST): UTC+3 (EEST)

Cinișeuți is a village in Rezina District, Moldova.
