= Mărăndeni =

- Village
- Location within Moldova
- Coordinates: 47.6641666667°N 27.8308333333°E
- Country: Moldova
- District: Fălești District

Government
  - Mayor: Anatolie Goncearenco (PDM)

Population (2014 census)
  - Total: 2,247
- Time zone: UTC+2 (EET)
  - Summer (DST): UTC+3 (EEST)
- Website: http://marandeni.do.am/

Mărăndeni is a village in Fălești District, Moldova.
