= Podgoreni =

- Commune and village
- Location in Moldova
- Coordinates: 47°34′N 28°47′E
- Country: Moldova
- District: Orhei District

Population (2014 census)
  - Total: 1,057
- Time zone: UTC+2 (EET)
  - Summer (DST): UTC+3 (EEST)

Podgoreni is a village in Orhei District, Moldova.
