= Terebna =

- Village
- Location within Edineț
- Coordinates: 48°2′52″N 27°14′59″E
- Country: Moldova

Government
  - Mayor: Vitalii Vicol (PLDM)
- Elevation: 214 m (702 ft)

Population (2014 census)
  - Total: 1,314
- Time zone: UTC+2 (EET)
  - Summer (DST): UTC+3 (EEST)
- Postal code: MD-4642

Terebna is a village in Edineț District, Moldova.
