= Găuzeni =

- Village
- Location within Moldova
- Coordinates: 47°45′N 28°34′E
- Country: Moldova
- District: Șoldănești District

Government
  - Mayor: Gheorghe Ianco (PDM)

Population (2014 census)
  - Total: 1,264
- Time zone: UTC+2 (EET)
  - Summer (DST): UTC+3 (EEST)

Găuzeni is a village in Șoldănești District, Moldova.
