= Crihana =

- Commune and village
- Location in Moldova
- Coordinates: 47°31′17″N 28°43′14″E
- Country: Moldova
- District: Orhei District

Population (2014)
  - Total: 958
- Time zone: UTC+2 (EET)
  - Summer (DST): UTC+3 (EEST)

Crihana is a commune in Orhei District, Moldova. It is composed of three villages: Crihana, Cucuruzenii de Sus and Sirota.
