= Poiana, Șoldănești =

Poiana
- Village
- Location within Moldova
- Coordinates: 47°53′02″N 28°51′23″E
- Country: Moldova
- District: Șoldănești District

Government
  - Mayor: Nadejda Negruța (independent)
- Elevation: 231 m (758 ft)

Population (2014 census)
  - Total: 819
- Time zone: UTC+2 (EET)
  - Summer (DST): UTC+3 (EEST)
- Postal code: MD-7227

Poiana is a village in Șoldănești District, Moldova.
