= Egoreni =

- Village
- Location within Moldova
- Coordinates: 48.2016666667°N 28.3594444444°E
- Country: Moldova
- District: Soroca District

Government
  - Mayor: Victor Mutruc (PDM)

Population (2014 census)
  - Total: 890
- Time zone: UTC+2 (EET)
  - Summer (DST): UTC+3 (EEST)

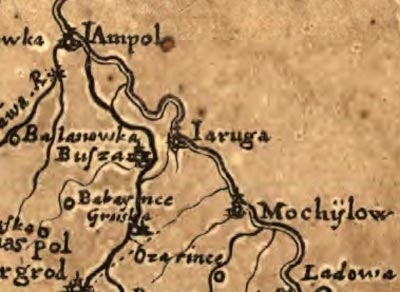
Area around Egorenu on Beauplan's map from 1648. (South is up).

Egoreni is a village in Soroca District, Moldova.
