= Nihoreni =

- Village
- Location within Moldova
- Coordinates: 47.9333333333°N 27.5666666667°E
- Country: Moldova
- District: Rîșcani

Government
  - Mayor: Constantin Macovei (PN)

Population (2014 census)
  - Total: 2,962
- Time zone: UTC+2 (EET)
  - Summer (DST): UTC+3 (EEST)

Nihoreni is a village in Rîșcani District, Moldova.
