= Lucești =

- Village
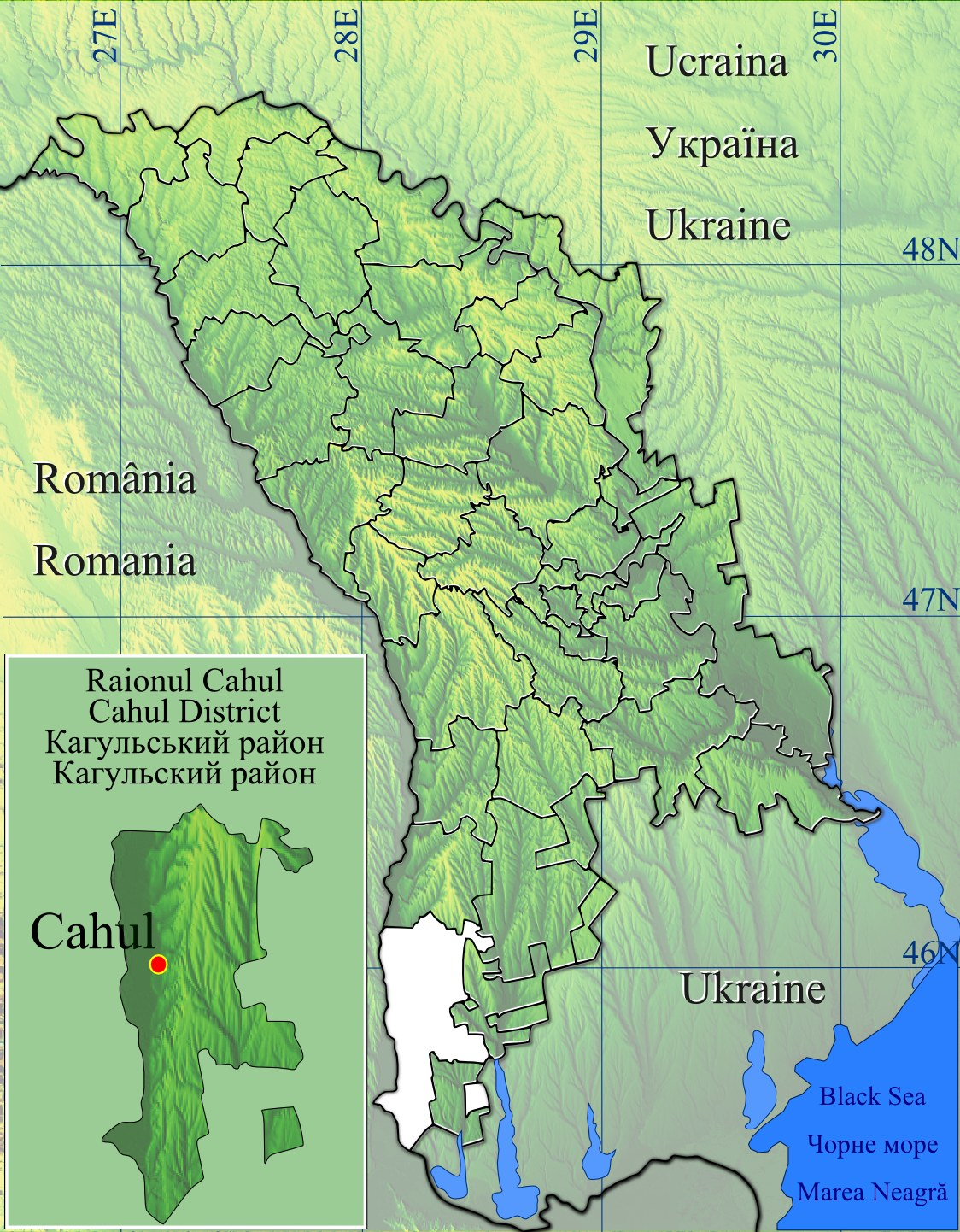
- Location within Cahul
- Coordinates: 45°59′21″N 28°19′46″E
- Country: Moldova

Government
  - Mayor: Constantin Cotruță (PDM)

Population (2014 census)
  - Total: 504
- Time zone: UTC+2 (EET)
  - Summer (DST): UTC+3 (EEST)
- Postal code: MD-3924

Lucești is a village in Cahul District, Moldova.
