= Parcova =

- Commune
- Location within Edineț
- Coordinates: 48°9′7″N 27°24′18″E
- Country: Moldova
- Elevation: 178 m (584 ft)

Population (2014)
  - Total: 2,188
- Time zone: UTC+2 (EET)
  - Summer (DST): UTC+3 (EEST)
- Postal code: MD-4636

Parcova is a commune in Edineț District, Moldova. It is composed of two villages, Fîntîna Albă and Parcova.
