= Tîrșiței =

- Commune
- Location within Moldova
- Coordinates: 47.6925°N 28.5777777778°E
- Country: Moldova
- District: Telenești District

Government
  - Mayor: Tulbure Ion

Population (2014)
  - Total: 1,593
- Time zone: UTC+2 (EET)
  - Summer (DST): UTC+3 (EEST)

Tîrșiței is a commune in Teleneşti District, Moldova. It is composed of two villages, Flutura and Tîrșiței.
