= Zastînca =

- Village
- Location within Moldova
- Coordinates: 48.1411111111°N 28.2830555555°E
- Country: Moldova
- District: Soroca District

Government
  - Mayor: Pavel Covalciuc (PDM)

Population (2014 census)
  - Total: 2,011
- Time zone: UTC+2 (EET)
  - Summer (DST): UTC+3 (EEST)

Zastînca is a village in Soroca District, Moldova.
