= Gîrbova =

- Commune
- Location within Moldova
- Coordinates: 48°23′N 27°37′E
- Country: Moldova
- District: Ocnița

Area
  - Total: 2.4 km^{2} (0.93 sq mi)
- Elevation: 247 m (810 ft)

Population (2014 census)
  - Total: 1,254
  - Density: 520/km^{2} (1,400/sq mi)
- Time zone: UTC+2 (EET)
  - Summer (DST): UTC+3 (EEST)
- Postal Code: 7121
- Area code: 271
- Vehicle registration: OC

Gîrbova is a village in Ocnița District, Moldova.
