= Peticeni =

- Village
- Location within Moldova
- Coordinates: 47.2361111111°N 28.2086111111°E
- Country: Moldova
- District: Călărași

Government
  - Mayor: Sergiu Șpac (PAS)

Population (2014 census)
  - Total: 1,108
- Time zone: UTC+2 (EET)
  - Summer (DST): UTC+3 (EEST)

Peticeni is a village in Călărași District, Moldova.
