= Băhrinești =

- Village
- Location within Moldova
- Coordinates: 47.8547222222°N 28.2425°E
- Country: Moldova
- District: Florești

Government
  - Mayor: Feodosia Bunescu (PLDM)

Population (2014 census)
  - Total: 1,958
- Time zone: UTC+2 (EET)
  - Summer (DST): UTC+3 (EEST)

Băhrinești is a village in Florești District, Moldova.
