= Onești, Hîncești =

Onești
- Commune
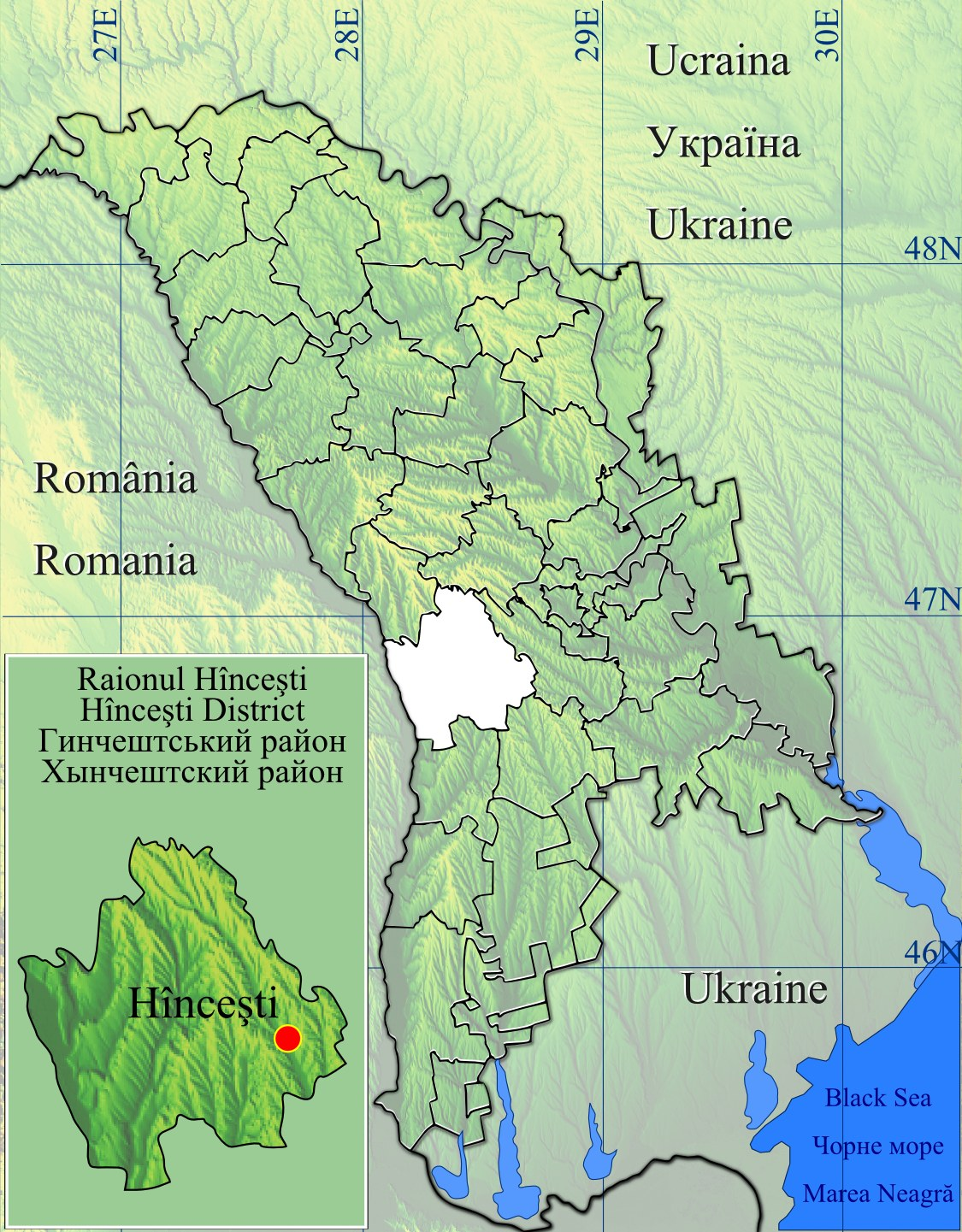
- Location within Hîncești
- Coordinates: 46°51′43″N 28°15′3″E
- Country: Moldova
- District: Hîncești District

Government
  - Mayor: Iurie Rotaru, PSRM 2015
- Elevation: 58 m (190 ft)

Population (2014)
  - Total: 1,429
- Time zone: UTC+2 (EET)
  - Summer (DST): UTC+3 (EEST)
- Postal code: MD-3441

Onești is a commune in Hînceşti District, Moldova. It is composed of two villages, Onești and Strîmbeni.
