= Communes of Moldova =

Moldova territorial subdivision of a raion or municipality

According to the Moldovan law on territorial administrative organisation, two or more villages can form together a commune.

Below is the list of communes of Moldova, grouped by the first-tier administrative unit to which they belong, and including the number and the list of villages of which they are comprised, plus the population values as of 2004 and 2014 Moldovan Censuses. In communes under Transnistrian control, censuses were not held.

Current communes

1
2
3
4
5
6
7
8
9
10
11
12
13
14
15
16
17
18
19
20
21
22
23
24
25
26
27
28
29
30
31
32
33
34
35
36
37
38
39
40
41
42
43
44
45
46
47
48
49
50
51
52
53
54
55
56
57
58
59
60
61
62
63
64
65
66
67
68
69
70
71
72
73
74
75
76
77
78
79
80
81
82
83
84
85
86
87
88
89
90
91
92
93
94
95
96
97
98
99
100
101
102
103
104
105
106
107
108
109
110
111
112
113
114
115
116
117
118
119
120
121
122
123
124
125
126
127
128
129
130
131
132
133
134
135
136
137
138
139
140
141
142
143
144
145
146
147
148
149
150
151
152
153
154
155
156
157
158
159
160
161
162
163
164
165
166
167
168
169
170
171
172
173
174
175
176
177
178
179
180
181
182
183
184
185
186
187
188
189
190
191
192
193
194
195
196
197
198
199
200
201
202
203
204
205
206
207
208
209
210
211
212
213
214
215
216
217
218
219
220
221
222
223
224
225
226
227
228
229
230
231
232
233
234
235
236
237
238
239
240
241
242
243
244
245
246
247
248
249
250
251
252
253
254
255
256
257
258
259
260
261
262
263
264
265
266
267
268
269
270
271
272
273
274
275
276
277
278
279
280
281
282
283
284
285
286
287
288
289
290
291
292
293
294
295
296
297
298
299
300
301
302
303
304
305
306
307
308
309
310
311
312
313
314
315
316
317
318
319
320
321
322
323
324
325
326
327
328
329
330
331
332
333
334
335
336
337
338
339
340
341
342
343
344
345
346
347
348
349
350
351
352
353
354
355
356
357
358
359
360
361
362
363
364
365
366
367
368
369
370
371
372
373
374
375
376
377
378
379
380
381
382
383
384
385
386
387
388
389
390
391
392
393
394
395
396
397
398
399
400
401
402
403
404
405
406
407
408
409
410
411

Commune	District / Municipality / Autonomous unit	Nr. of villages	Villages	Population in 2004	Population in 2014
Băcioi	Chișinău	4	Băcioi, Brăila, Frumușica, Străisteni	10,618	10,175
Trușeni	Chișinău	2	Trușeni, Dumbrava	7,952	10,380
Bubuieci	Chișinău	3	Bubuieci, Bîc, Humulești	6,748	8,047
Cruzești	Chișinău	2	Cruzești, Ceroborta	1,655	1,815
Tohatin	Chișinău	3	Tohatin, Buneți, Cheltuitori	2,487	2,596
Ciorescu	Chișinău	3	Ciorescu, Făurești, Goian	7,096	5,961
Grătiești	Chișinău	2	Grătiești, Hulboaca	6,242	6,183
Stăuceni	Chișinău	2	Stăuceni, Goianul Nou	6,833	8,694
Botnărești	Anenii Noi	2	Botnărești, Salcia	1,092	1,003
Calfa	Anenii Noi	2	Calfa, Calfa Nouă	1,797	1,531
Chetrosu	Anenii Noi	2	Chetrosu, Todirești	3,817	3,873
Chirca	Anenii Noi	2	Chirca, Botnăreștii Noi	1,810	1,826
Ciobanovca	Anenii Noi	4	Ciobanovca, Balmaz, Mirnoe, Troița Nouă	1,933	1,718
Cobusca Veche	Anenii Noi	2	Cobusca Veche, Florești	2,295	2,296
Geamăna	Anenii Noi	2	Geamăna, Batîc	3,433	3,062
Ochiul Roș	Anenii Noi	2	Ochiul Roș, Picus	477	346
Telița	Anenii Noi	2	Telița, Telița Nouă	1,206	1,099
Țînțăreni	Anenii Noi	2	Țînțăreni, Crețoaia	3,325	3,221
Zolotievca	Anenii Noi	3	Zolotievca, Larga, Nicolaevca	1,000	807
Iserlia	Basarabeasca	4	Iserlia, Bogdanovca, Carabiber, Ivanovca	1,205	1,062
Bălcăuți	Briceni	2	Bălcăuți, Bocicăuți	731	671
Berlinți	Briceni	2	Berlinți, Caracușenii Noi	2,105	1,913
Bogdănești	Briceni	3	Bogdănești, Bezeda, Grimești	1,293	1,169
Colicăuți	Briceni	2	Colicăuți, Trestieni	3,008	2,875
Halahora de Sus	Briceni	3	Halahora de Sus, Chirilovca, Halahora de Jos	1,589	1,588
Larga	Briceni	2	Larga, Pavlovca	5,080	4,318
Marcăuți	Briceni	2	Marcăuți, Marcăuții Noi	1,617	1,411
Medveja	Briceni	2	Medveja, Slobozia-Medveja	1,712	1,423
Mihăileni	Briceni	2	Mihăileni, Groznița	861	689
Bucuria	Cahul	2	Bucuria, Tudorești	897	599
Burlacu	Cahul	2	Burlacu, Spicoasa	2,087	1,795
Burlăceni	Cahul	2	Burlăceni, Greceni	2,383	1,688
Chioselia Mare	Cahul	2	Chioselia Mare, Frumușica	1,604	1,493
Cucoara	Cahul	2	Cucoara, Chircani	1,971	1,702
Doina	Cahul	3	Doina, Iasnaia Poleana, Rumeanțev	1,819	1,521
Găvănoasa	Cahul	3	Găvănoasa, Nicolaevca, Vladimirovca	2,386	2,111
Larga Nouă	Cahul	2	Larga Nouă, Larga Veche	1,536	1,477
Lebedenco	Cahul	3	Lebedenco, Hutulu, Ursoaia	2,488	2,171
Manta	Cahul	2	Manta, Pașcani	3,977	3,840
Moscovei	Cahul	2	Moscovei, Trifeștii Noi	3,467	2,767
Pelinei	Cahul	2	Pelinei, Sătuc	2,328	2,183
Zîrnești	Cahul	3	Zîrnești, Paicu, Tretești	2,467	2,203
Antonești	Cantemir	2	Antonești, Leca	1,526	1,469
Baimaclia	Cantemir	3	Baimaclia, Acui, Suhat	3,473	2,649
Cania	Cantemir	2	Cania, Iepureni	3,713	3,174
Chioselia	Cantemir	2	Chioselia, Țărăncuța	2,401	1,798
Ciobalaccia	Cantemir	3	Ciobalaccia, Flocoasa, Victorovca	3,014	3,017
Cîietu	Cantemir	2	Cîietu, Dimitrova	1,302	1,211
Cîșla	Cantemir	2	Cîșla, Șofranovca	690	642
Enichioi	Cantemir	4	Enichioi, Bobocica, Floricica, Țolica	1,917	1,776
Gotești	Cantemir	2	Gotești, Constantinești	4,478	4,088
Lingura	Cantemir	3	Lingura, Crăciun, Popovca	1,612	1,457
Pleșeni	Cantemir	3	Pleșeni, Hănăseni, Tătărășeni	3,115	2,903
Plopi	Cantemir	4	Plopi, Alexandrovca, Hîrtop, Taraclia	1,668	1,384
Sadîc	Cantemir	2	Sadîc, Taraclia	2,364	2,033
Toceni	Cantemir	2	Toceni, Vîlcele	1,294	1,104
Țiganca	Cantemir	3	Țiganca, Ghioltosu, Țiganca Nouă	2,757	2,596
Bahmut	Călărași	2	Bahmut, Bahmut (loc. st. c. f.)	1,967	1,670
Buda	Călărași	2	Buda, Ursari	1,084	987
Dereneu	Călărași	3	Dereneu, Bularda, Duma	1,372	1,301
Hîrjauca	Călărași	4	Hîrjauca, Leordoaia, Mîndra, Palanca	2,877	2,505
Onișcani	Călărași	3	Onișcani, Hîrbovăț, Sverida	2,210	1,799
Răciula	Călărași	2	Răciula, Parcani	2,604	2,269
Săseni	Călărași	2	Săseni, Bahu	2,315	2,249
Sipoteni	Călărași	2	Sipoteni, Podul Lung	7,383	6,845
Tuzara	Călărași	3	Tuzara, Novaci, Seliștea Nouă	3,015	2,456
Țibirica	Călărași	2	Țibirica, Schinoasa	—	2,169
Baccealia	Căușeni	4	Baccealia, Florica, Plop, Tricolici	1,781	2,087
Baimaclia	Căușeni	2	Baimaclia, Surchiceni	2,571	2,207
Chircăieștii Noi	Căușeni	2	Chircăieștii Noi, Baurci	1,640	1,556
Cîrnățenii Noi	Căușeni	2	Cîrnățenii Noi, Sălcuța Nouă	1,813	1,444
Fîrlădeni	Căușeni	2	Fîrlădeni, Fîrlădenii Noi	4,860	4,406
Grădinița	Căușeni	3	Grădinița, Leuntea, Valea Verde	1,325	1,053
Pervomaisc	Căușeni	2	Pervomaisc, Constantinovca	1,439	1,306
Tănătarii Noi	Căușeni	3	Tănătarii Noi, Ștefănești, Ursoaia Nouă	753	636
Ucrainca	Căușeni	2	Ucrainca, Zviozdocica	1,754	1,559
Zaim	Căușeni	3	Zaim, Marianca de Sus, Zaim (loc. st. c. f.)	4,657	4,281
Albina	Cimișlia	3	Albina, Fetița, Mereni	2,131	1,781
Codreni	Cimișlia	2	Codreni, Zloți (loc. st. c. f.)	722	639
Ecaterinovca	Cimișlia	2	Ecaterinovca, Coștangalia	1,906	1,512
Gradiște	Cimișlia	2	Gradiște, Iurievca	2,514	2,109
Hîrtop	Cimișlia	3	Hîrtop, Ialpug, Prisaca	2,439	1,974
Ialpujeni	Cimișlia	2	Ialpujeni, Marienfeld	1,855	1,401
Javgur	Cimișlia	3	Javgur, Artimonovca, Maximeni	2,179	1,359
Lipoveni	Cimișlia	3	Lipoveni, Munteni, Schinoșica	2,107	1,761
Porumbrei	Cimișlia	2	Porumbrei, Sagaidacul Nou	1,632	1,520
Bălăbănești	Criuleni	3	Bălăbănești, Mălăiești, Mălăieștii Noi	3,554	3,533
Bălțata	Criuleni	4	Bălțata, Bălțata de Sus, Sagaidac, Sagaidacul de Sus	1,781	1,750
Boșcana	Criuleni	2	Boșcana, Mărdăreuca	3,380	3,390
Dolinnoe	Criuleni	3	Dolinnoe, Valea Coloniței, Valea Satului	1,123	1,154
Drăsliceni	Criuleni	3	Drăsliceni, Logănești, Ratuș	3,029	3,221
Hîrtopul Mare	Criuleni	2	Hîrtopul Mare, Hîrtopul Mic	3,900	4,091
Hrușova	Criuleni	3	Hrușova, Chetroasa, Ciopleni	2,394	2,494
Miclești	Criuleni	2	Miclești, Stețcani	2,358	2,205
Pașcani	Criuleni	2	Pașcani, Porumbeni	2,331	2,527
Răculești	Criuleni	2	Răculești, Bălășești	1,841	1,631
Elizavetovca	Dondușeni	2	Elizavetovca, Boroseni	632	513
Frasin	Dondușeni	3	Frasin, Caraiman, Codrenii Noi	2,090	1,706
Moșana	Dondușeni	2	Moșana, Octeabriscoe	1,796	1,667
Sudarca	Dondușeni	2	Sudarca, Braicău	2,013	1,753
Teleșeuca	Dondușeni	2	Teleșeuca, Teleșeuca Nouă	828	636
Tîrnova	Dondușeni	3	Tîrnova, Briceva, Elenovca	4,606	3,539
Baroncea	Drochia	2	Baroncea, Baroncea Nouă	1,609	1,534
Cotova	Drochia	2	Cotova, Măcăreuca	3,569	2,954
Fîntînița	Drochia	2	Fîntînița, Ghizdita (loc. st. c. f.)	1,405	1,186
Hăsnășenii Noi	Drochia	2	Hăsnășenii Noi, Lazo	1,736	1,620
Palanca	Drochia	3	Palanca, Holoșnița Nouă, Șalvirii Noi	901	715
Pervomaiscoe	Drochia	2	Pervomaiscoe, Sergheuca	897	896
Petreni	Drochia	2	Petreni, Popeștii Noi	1,179	1,002
Șalvirii Vechi	Drochia	3	Șalvirii Vechi, Ceapaevca, Iliciovca	1,082	732
Șuri	Drochia	2	Șuri, Șurii Noi	4,614	4,098
Cocieri	Dubăsari	2	Cocieri, Vasilievca	4,336	3,885
Corjova	Dubăsari	2	Corjova, Mahala	3,231	
Coșnița	Dubăsari	2	Coșnița, Pohrebea	5,699	5,545
Molovata Nouă	Dubăsari	2	Molovata Nouă, Roghi	1,851	
Bleșteni	Edineț	2	Bleșteni, Volodeni	1,794	1,567
Brătușeni	Edineț	2	Brătușeni, Brătușenii Noi	5,432	4,772
Burlănești	Edineț	2	Burlănești, Buzdugeni	1,796	1,645
Cepeleuți	Edineț	3	Cepeleuți, Rîngaci, Vancicăuți	1,494	1,239
Constantinovca	Edineț	2	Constantinovca, Iachimeni	623	537
Cuconeștii Noi	Edineț	2	Cuconeștii Noi, Cuconeștii Vechi	2,081	1,869
Hincăuți	Edineț	3	Hincăuți, Clișcăuți, Poiana	1,669	1,492
Parcova	Edineț	2	Parcova, Fîntîna Albă	2,321	2,188
Rotunda	Edineț	2	Rotunda, Hlinaia Mică	1,530	1,120
Ruseni	Edineț	2	Ruseni, Slobodca	2,130	2,121
Zăbriceni	Edineț	2	Zăbriceni, Onești	2,426	2,147
Albinețul Vechi	Fălești	4	Albinețul Vechi, Albinețul Nou, Rediul de Jos, Rediul de Sus	2,773	2,423
Călugăr	Fălești	4	Călugăr, Frumușica, Socii Noi, Socii Vechi	3,040	2,625
Ciolacu Nou	Fălești	5	Ciolacu Nou, Ciolacu Vechi, Făgădău, Pocrovca, Șoltoaia	3,225	2,958
Egorovca	Fălești	3	Egorovca, Catranîc (loc. st. c. f.), Ciuluc	1,968	1,698
Făleștii Noi	Fălești	2	Făleștii Noi, Pietrosul Nou	2,373	2,067
Hiliuți	Fălești	2	Hiliuți, Răuțelul Nou	2,259	1,991
Horești	Fălești	3	Horești, Lucăceni, Unteni	1,456	1,056
Ișcălău	Fălești	3	Ișcălău, Burghelea, Doltu	2,825	2,441
Logofteni	Fălești	2	Logofteni, Moldoveanca	1,450	1,137
Natalievca	Fălești	6	Natalievca, Beleuți, Comarovca, Ivanovca, Popovca, Țapoc,	2,231	1,981
Obreja Veche	Fălești	2	Obreja Veche, Obreja Nouă	2,861	2,367
Pietrosu	Fălești	3	Pietrosu, Măgura, Măgura Nouă	976	811
Pînzăreni	Fălești	2	Pînzăreni, Pînzărenii Noi	1,393	1,298
Pompa	Fălești	3	Pompa, Pervomaisc, Suvorovca	1,263	1,035
Pruteni	Fălești	4	Pruteni, Cuzmenii Vechi, Drujineni, Valea Rusului	2,728	2,140
Risipeni	Fălești	2	Risipeni, Bocșa	2,115	1,913
Sărata Veche	Fălești	3	Sărata Veche, Hitrești, Sărata Nouă	4,603	4,329
Scumpia	Fălești	4	Scumpia, Hîrtop, Măgureanca, Nicolaevca	3,807	3,243
Taxobeni	Fălești	3	Taxobeni, Hrubna Nouă, Vrănești	1,687	1,483
Alexeevca	Florești	4	Alexeevca, Chirilovca, Dumitreni, Rădulenii Noi	1,511	1,169
Ciutulești	Florești	4	Ciutulești, Ion Vodă, Mărinești, Sîrbești	3,134	2,972
Cuhureștii de Jos	Florești	2	Cuhureștii de Jos, Țipordei	2,299	1,938
Cuhureștii de Sus	Florești	4	Cuhureștii de Sus, Nicolaevca, Unchitești, Unchitești (loc. st. c. f.)	2,441	2,173
Frumușica	Florești	2	Frumușica, Frumușica Nouă	1,560	1,556
Ghindești	Florești	4	Ghindești, Hîrtop, Țîra, Țîra (loc. st. c. f.)	2,603	2,172
Gura Camencii	Florești	3	Gura Camencii, Bobulești, Gvozdova	3,538	3,018
Gura Căinarului	Florești	2	Gura Căinarului, Zarojeni	1,975	1,734
Iliciovca	Florești	2	Iliciovca, Maiscoe	1,819	1,320
Izvoare	Florești	3	Izvoare, Bezeni, Scăieni	1,811	1,593
Japca	Florești	2	Japca, Bursuc	1,737	1,489
Nicolaevca	Florești	2	Nicolaevca, Valea Rădoaiei	1,081	923
Prajila	Florești	4	Prajila, Antonovca, Frunzești, Mihailovca	3,384	2,574
Prodănești	Florești	2	Prodănești, Căprești	1,936	1,802
Roșietici	Florești	3	Roșietici, Cenușa, Roșieticii Vechi	2,390	2,186
Sevirova	Florești	2	Sevirova, Ivanovca	1,270	1,193
Ștefănești	Florești	2	Ștefănești, Prodăneștii Vechi	2,482	2,335
Trifănești	Florești	2	Trifănești, Alexandrovca	1,441	1,181
Vărvăreuca	Florești	2	Vărvăreuca, Stîrceni	3,072	2,860
Văscăuți	Florești	3	Văscăuți, Făgădău, Octeabriscoe	1,338	990
Balatina	Glodeni	5	Balatina, Clococenii Vechi, Lipovăț, Tomeștii Noi, Tomeștii Vechi	5,637	4,803
Camenca	Glodeni	4	Camenca, Brînzeni, Butești, Molești	2,167	1,889
Cuhnești	Glodeni	5	Cuhnești, Bisericani, Cot, Movileni, Serghieni	3,074	2,635
Danu	Glodeni	3	Danu, Camencuța, Nicolaevca	3,516	2,979
Iabloana	Glodeni	2	Iabloana, Soroca	2,965	2,263
Viișoara	Glodeni	2	Viișoara, Moara Domnească	2,010	1,765
Bobeica	Hîncești	3	Bobeica, Dahnovici, Drăgușeni	3,118	2,565
Bozieni	Hîncești	2	Bozieni, Dubovca	2,336	2,406
Cărpineni	Hîncești	2	Cărpineni, Horjești	10,910	8,358
Cotul Morii	Hîncești	2	Cotul Morii, Sărăteni	2,299	1,622
Crasnoarmeiscoe	Hîncești	2	Crasnoarmeiscoe, Tălăiești	4,525	4,003
Drăgușenii Noi	Hîncești	2	Drăgușenii Noi, Horodca	2,259	1,865
Ivanovca	Hîncești	3	Ivanovca, Costești, Frasin	1,056	999
Lăpușna	Hîncești	3	Lăpușna, Anini, Rusca	6,262	5,022
Leușeni	Hîncești	2	Leușeni, Feteasca	2,323	2,046
Mereșeni	Hîncești	2	Mereșeni, Sărata-Mereșeni	2,785	2,454
Mingir	Hîncești	2	Mingir, Semionovca	5,039	4,872
Mirești	Hîncești	2	Mirești, Chetroșeni	1,274	1,240
Onești	Hîncești	2	Onești, Strîmbeni	1,541	1,429
Pașcani	Hîncești	2	Pașcani, Pereni	2,795	2,400
Pogănești	Hîncești	2	Pogănești, Marchet	1,617	1,336
Sărata-Galbenă	Hîncești	5	Sărata-Galbenă, Brătianovca, Cărpineanca, Coroliovca, Valea Florii	5,695	4,822
Secăreni	Hîncești	3	Secăreni, Cornești, Secărenii Noi	1,558	1,656
Gangura	Ialoveni	4	Gangura, Alexandrovca, Homuteanovca, Misovca	2,392	2,173
Mileștii Mici	Ialoveni	2	Mileștii Mici, Piatra Albă	4,397	4,969
Răzeni	Ialoveni	2	Răzeni, Mileștii Noi	7,451	7,031
Ruseștii Noi	Ialoveni	2	Ruseștii Noi, Ruseștii Vechi	5,379	5,449
Țipala	Ialoveni	3	Țipala, Bălțați, Budăi	4,295	4,280
Zîmbreni	Ialoveni	2	Zîmbreni, Găureni	2,705	2,588
Băiuș	Leova	3	Băiuș, Cociulia Nouă, Hîrtop	1,315	1,059
Beștemac	Leova	2	Beștemac, Pitești	1,109	832
Cazangic	Leova	3	Cazangic, Frumușica, Seliște	1,461	1,660
Cneazevca	Leova	2	Cneazevca, Cîzlar	1,131	841
Hănăsenii Noi	Leova	2	Hănăsenii Noi, Nicolaevca	1,127	983
Sărata Nouă	Leova	2	Sărata Nouă, Bulgărica	—	1,592
Sărăteni	Leova	2	Sărăteni, Victoria	921	987
Sărățica Nouă	Leova	2	Sărățica Nouă, Cîmpul Drept	1,170	935
Tigheci	Leova	2	Tigheci, Cuporani	2,527	2,300
Tomaiul Nou	Leova	2	Tomaiul Nou, Sărățica Veche	769	753
Vozneseni	Leova	3	Vozneseni, Troian, Troița	1,396	1,192
Bălănești	Nisporeni	2	Bălănești, Găureni	2,932	2,170
Boldurești	Nisporeni	3	Boldurești, Băcșeni, Chilișoaia	4,235	3,123
Brătuleni	Nisporeni	2	Brătuleni, Cîrnești	2,120	1,793
Ciorești	Nisporeni	2	Ciorești, Vulcănești	4,587	3,430
Ciutești	Nisporeni	2	Ciutești, Valea Nîrnovei	1,850	1,530
Iurceni	Nisporeni	2	Iurceni, Mîrzoaia	2,018	1,764
Marinici	Nisporeni	2	Marinici, Heleșteni	2,599	2,215
Seliște	Nisporeni	2	Seliște, Păruceni	3,388	2,837
Șișcani	Nisporeni	3	Șișcani, Drojdieni, Odaia	2,901	2,217
Valea-Trestieni	Nisporeni	5	Valea-Trestieni, Isăicani, Luminița, Odobești, Selișteni	2,142	1,839
Vărzărești	Nisporeni	2	Vărzărești, Șendreni	6,344	5,187
Bîrlădeni	Ocnița	3	Bîrlădeni, Paladea, Rujnița	2,591	2,569
Calarașovca	Ocnița	2	Calarașovca, Berezovca	2,292	2,098
Corestăuți	Ocnița	2	Corestăuți, Stălinești	1,137	990
Dîngeni	Ocnița	2	Dîngeni, Grinăuți	1,752	1,567
Grinăuți-Moldova	Ocnița	3	Grinăuți-Moldova, Grinăuți-Raia, Rediul Mare	2,380	2,062
Lencăuți	Ocnița	2	Lencăuți, Verejeni	1,870	1,681
Lipnic	Ocnița	2	Lipnic, Paustova	3,602	3,271
Mihălășeni	Ocnița	2	Mihălășeni, Grinăuți	1,539	1,433
Ocnița	Ocnița	2	Ocnița, Maiovca	3,282	3,133
Vălcineț	Ocnița	2	Vălcineț, Codreni	2,873	2,162
Berezlogi	Orhei	2	Berezlogi, Hîjdieni	2,224	1,800
Biești	Orhei	3	Biești, Cihoreni, Slobozia-Hodorogea	3,037	2,287
Chiperceni	Orhei	3	Chiperceni, Andreevca, Voroteț	3,573	2,786
Ciocîlteni	Orhei	3	Ciocîlteni, Clișova Nouă, Fedoreuca	3,262	2,621
Crihana	Orhei	3	Crihana, Cucuruzenii de Sus, Sirota	1,361	958
Cucuruzeni	Orhei	2	Cucuruzeni, Ocnița-Răzeși	2,127	1,749
Donici	Orhei	3	Donici, Camencea, Pocșești	1,890	1,765
Ghetlova	Orhei	3	Ghetlova, Hulboaca, Noroceni	2,770	2,522
Ivancea	Orhei	3	Ivancea, Brănești, Furceni	5,904	5,032
Jora de Mijloc	Orhei	4	Jora de Mijloc, Jora de Jos, Jora de Sus, Lopatna	4,052	3,543
Mălăiești	Orhei	2	Mălăiești, Tîrzieni	1,460	1,273
Mîrzești	Orhei	2	Mîrzești, Mîrzaci	1,435	1,184
Morozeni	Orhei	2	Morozeni, Breanova	2,091	1,739
Pelivan	Orhei	2	Pelivan, Cișmea	3,714	3,257
Piatra	Orhei	2	Piatra, Jeloboc	2,513	2,542
Pohrebeni	Orhei	3	Pohrebeni, Izvoare, Șercani	3,004	2,641
Puțintei	Orhei	3	Puțintei, Dișcova, Vîprova	2,758	2,173
Seliște	Orhei	3	Seliște, Lucășeuca, Mana	4,462	4,049
Step-Soci	Orhei	2	Step-Soci, Budăi	2,403	2,095
Trebujeni	Orhei	3	Trebujeni, Butuceni, Morovaia	1,912	1,624
Vatici	Orhei	3	Vatici, Curchi, Tabăra	2,311	1,977
Zorile	Orhei	3	Zorile, Inculeț, Ocnița-Țărani	1,027	899
Ghiduleni	Rezina	3	Ghiduleni, Roșcanii de Jos, Roșcanii de Sus	1,226	1,041
Horodiște	Rezina	2	Horodiște, Slobozia-Horodiște	1,333	1,545
Lalova	Rezina	3	Lalova, Nistreni, Țipova	1,349	1,482
Mincenii de Jos	Rezina	2	Mincenii de Jos, Mincenii de Sus	763	641
Pereni	Rezina	2	Pereni, Roșcani	612	576
Pripiceni-Răzeși	Rezina	2	Pripiceni-Răzeși, Pripiceni-Curchi	1,189	1,069
Saharna Nouă	Rezina	3	Saharna Nouă, Buciușca, Saharna	1,624	1,325
Sîrcova	Rezina	2	Sîrcova, Piscărești	2,321	1,967
Solonceni	Rezina	2	Solonceni, Tarasova	1,739	1,658
Țareuca	Rezina	2	Țareuca, Țahnăuți	3,112	2,627
Alexăndrești	Rîșcani	4	Alexăndrești, Cucuieții Noi, Cucuieții Vechi, Ivănești	1,132	762
Braniște	Rîșcani	4	Braniște, Avrămeni, Reteni, Reteni-Vasileuți	1,474	1,275
Duruitoarea Nouă	Rîșcani	2	Duruitoarea Nouă, Dumeni	1,128	848
Gălășeni	Rîșcani	2	Gălășeni, Mălăiești	1,818	1,533
Grinăuți	Rîșcani	2	Grinăuți, Ciobanovca	1,204	1,070
Malinovscoe	Rîșcani	2	Malinovscoe, Lupăria	1,483	1,068
Pociumbeni	Rîșcani	2	Pociumbeni, Druța	1,370	1,158
Răcăria	Rîșcani	2	Răcăria, Ușurei	1,883	1,603
Recea	Rîșcani	3	Recea, Slobozia-Recea, Sverdiac	3,313	2,855
Șumna	Rîșcani	3	Șumna, Bulhac, Cepăria	622	485
Vasileuți	Rîșcani	5	Vasileuți, Ciubara, Mihăilenii Noi, Moșeni, Știubeieni	3,235	2,871
Alexăndreni	Sîngerei	5	Alexăndreni, Grigorești, Heciul Vechi, Țiplești, Țipletești	6,155	5,594
Bălășești	Sîngerei	2	Bălășești, Sloveanca	2,445	2,318
Bilicenii Noi	Sîngerei	3	Bilicenii Noi, Lipovanca, Mîndreștii Noi	2,016	1,809
Bilicenii Vechi	Sîngerei	2	Bilicenii Vechi, Coada Iazului	3,510	3,252
Bursuceni	Sîngerei	2	Bursuceni, Slobozia-Măgura	1,540	1,243
Chișcăreni	Sîngerei	3	Chișcăreni, Nicolaevca, Slobozia-Chișcăreni	5,720	4,890
Ciuciuieni	Sîngerei	2	Ciuciuieni, Brejeni	1,174	1,176
Copăceni	Sîngerei	6	Copăceni, Antonovca, Evghenievca, Gavrilovca, Petrovca, Vladimireuca	3,315	2,613
Coșcodeni	Sîngerei	3	Coșcodeni, Bobletici, Flămînzeni	2,931	2,573
Cotiujenii Mici	Sîngerei	3	Cotiujenii Mici, Alexeuca, Gura-Oituz	1,890	1,671
Cubolta	Sîngerei	2	Cubolta, Mărășești	2,168	1,814
Dobrogea Veche	Sîngerei	3	Dobrogea Veche, Cotovca, Dobrogea Nouă	1,770	1,685
Drăgănești	Sîngerei	3	Drăgănești, Chirileni, Sacarovca	3,047	2,940
Dumbrăvița	Sîngerei	3	Dumbrăvița, Bocancea-Schit, Valea lui Vlad	2,371	2,253
Grigorăuca	Sîngerei	3	Grigorăuca, Cozești, Petropavlovca	2,463	2,374
Heciul Nou	Sîngerei	2	Heciul Nou, Trifănești	2,760	2,531
Iezărenii Vechi	Sîngerei	2	Iezărenii Vechi, Iezărenii Noi	1,950	1,773
Izvoare	Sîngerei	2	Izvoare, Valea Norocului	975	853
Pepeni	Sîngerei	4	Pepeni, Pepenii Noi, Răzălăi, Romanovca	6,020	5,594
Prepelița	Sîngerei	4	Prepelița, Clișcăuți, Mihailovca, Șestaci	3,927	3,372
Tăura Veche	Sîngerei	2	Tăura Veche, Tăura Nouă	788	581
Sîngereii Noi	Sîngerei	2	Sîngereii Noi, Mărinești	4,842	5,122
Țambula	Sîngerei	3	Țambula, Octeabriscoe, Pălăria	1,481	1,552
Bădiceni	Soroca	2	Bădiceni, Grigorăuca	3,391	2,941
Bulboci	Soroca	2	Bulboci, Bulbocii Noi	2,284	1,970
Căinarii Vechi	Soroca	2	Căinarii Vechi, Floriceni	3,262	2,672
Cosăuți	Soroca	2	Cosăuți, Iorjnița	3,468	3,254
Cremenciug	Soroca	4	Cremenciug, Livezi, Sobari, Valea	998	890
Dărcăuți	Soroca	3	Dărcăuți, Dărcăuții Noi, Mălcăuți	1,534	1,276
Holoșnița	Soroca	2	Holoșnița, Cureșnița	1,624	1,208
Iarova	Soroca	3	Iarova, Balinți, Balinții Noi	1,094	770
Nimereuca	Soroca	2	Nimereuca, Cerlina	3,740	3,054
Ocolina	Soroca	2	Ocolina, Țepilova	1,900	1,669
Parcani	Soroca	2	Parcani, Voloave	1,927	1,729
Pîrlița	Soroca	3	Pîrlița, Vanțina, Vanțina Mică	837	722
Regina Maria	Soroca	2	Regina Maria, Lugovoe	718	674
Rublenița	Soroca	2	Rublenița, Rublenița Nouă	3,960	3,275
Schineni	Soroca	2	Schineni, Schinenii Noi	1,550	1,432
Stoicani	Soroca	2	Stoicani, Soloneț	1,550	1,202
Șolcani	Soroca	2	Șolcani, Cureșnița Nouă	1,594	1,408
Tătărăuca Veche	Soroca	6	Tătărăuca Veche, Decebal, Niorcani, Slobozia Nouă, Tătărăuca Nouă, Tolocănești	2,203	1,770
Vasilcău	Soroca	3	Vasilcău, Inundeni, Ruslanovca	3,041	2,366
Vădeni	Soroca	2	Vădeni, Dumbrăveni	2,695	1,922
Vărăncău	Soroca	3	Vărăncău, Slobozia-Cremene, Slobozia-Vărăncău	3,950	3,120
Volovița	Soroca	2	Volovița, Alexandru cel Bun	1,891	1,851
Codreanca	Strășeni	2	Codreanca, Lupa-Recea	2,565	2,236
Gălești	Strășeni	2	Gălești, Găleștii Noi	2,975	2,675
Ghelăuza	Strășeni	2	Ghelăuza, Saca	1,308	1,244
Greblești	Strășeni	2	Greblești, Mărtinești	755	672
Lozova	Strășeni	2	Lozova, Stejăreni	6,581	6,196
Micăuți	Strășeni	2	Micăuți, Gornoe	2,946	2,857
Micleușeni	Strășeni	2	Micleușeni, Huzun	2,334	2,343
Pănășești	Strășeni	2	Pănășești, Ciobanca	3,223	3,000
Rădeni	Strășeni	3	Rădeni, Drăgușeni, Zamcioji	3,071	3,203
Alcedar	Șoldănești	3	Alcedar, Curătura, Odaia	1,548	1,234
Climăuții de Jos	Șoldănești	2	Climăuții de Jos, Cot	1,467	1,239
Cotiujenii Mari	Șoldănești	3	Cotiujenii Mari, Cobîlea (loc. st. c. f.), Cușelăuca	3,657	3,141
Dobrușa	Șoldănești	3	Dobrușa, Recești, Zahorna	1,541	1,329
Rogojeni	Șoldănești	2	Rogojeni, Rogojeni (loc. st. c. f.)	743	712
Salcia	Șoldănești	2	Salcia, Lelina	1,053	973
Vadul-Rașcov	Șoldănești	2	Vadul-Rașcov, Socola	2,004	1,807
Alava	Ștefan Vodă	2	Alava, Lazo	495	420
Purcari	Ștefan Vodă	2	Purcari, Viișoara	2,891	2,368
Răscăieți	Ștefan Vodă	2	Răscăieți, Răscăieții Noi	3,599	3,114
Albota de Jos	Taraclia	3	Albota de Jos, Hagichioi, Hîrtop	1,555	1,425
Albota de Sus	Taraclia	3	Albota de Sus, Roșița, Sofievca	2,307	1,944
Budăi	Taraclia	2	Budăi, Dermengi	1,069	834
Cealîc	Taraclia	3	Cealîc, Cortenul Nou, Samurza	1,003	857
Salcia	Taraclia	2	Salcia, Orehovca	441	293
Vinogradovca	Taraclia	4	Vinogradovca, Chirilovca, Ciumai, Mirnoe	2,152	1,548
Bănești	Telenești	2	Bănești, Băneștii Noi	3,119	3,109
Brînzenii Noi	Telenești	2	Brînzenii Noi, Brînzenii Vechi	2,849	2,650
Căzănești	Telenești	3	Căzănești, Vadul-Leca, Vadul-Leca Nou	3,262	2,604
Chițcanii Vechi	Telenești	2	Chițcanii Vechi, Chițcanii Noi	2,528	2,222
Ghiliceni	Telenești	3	Ghiliceni, Cucioaia, Cucioaia Nouă	2,624	2,334
Mîndrești	Telenești	2	Mîndrești, Codru	4,833	4,217
Negureni	Telenești	3	Negureni, Chersac, Dobrușa	2,910	2,588
Pistruieni	Telenești	3	Pistruieni, Hîrtop, Pistruienii Noi	1,172	994
Ratuș	Telenești	5	Ratuș, Mîndra, Sărătenii Noi, Zăicani, Zăicanii Noi	1,936	1,743
Sărătenii Vechi	Telenești	2	Sărătenii Vechi, Zahareuca	2,868	2,531
Suhuluceni	Telenești	2	Suhuluceni, Ghermănești	1,895	1,643
Tîrșiței	Telenești	2	Tîrșiței, Flutura	1,954	1,593
Zgărdești	Telenești	3	Zgărdești, Bondareuca, Ciofu	968	726
Agronomovca	Ungheni	3	Agronomovca, Negurenii Noi, Zăzulenii Noi	1,234	1,000
Alexeevca	Ungheni	3	Alexeevca, Lidovca, Săghieni	1,215	1,093
Boghenii Noi	Ungheni	5	Boghenii Noi, Boghenii Vechi, Izvoreni, Mircești, Poiana	1,921	1,447
Buciumeni	Ungheni	3	Buciumeni, Buciumeni (loc. st. c. f.), Florești	1,426	1,266
Cioropcani	Ungheni	3	Cioropcani, Bulhac, Stolniceni	2,677	2,467
Condrătești	Ungheni	2	Condrătești, Curtoaia	1,410	1,098
Florițoaia Veche	Ungheni	3	Florițoaia Veche, Florițoaia Nouă, Grozasca	2,096	2,051
Hîrcești	Ungheni	5	Hîrcești, Drujba, Leordoaia, Mînzătești, Veverița	2,103	1,798
Măcărești	Ungheni	2	Măcărești, Frăsinești	4,660	4,192
Mănoilești	Ungheni	4	Mănoilești, Novaia Nicolaevca, Rezina, Vulpești	3,461	3,143
Morenii Noi	Ungheni	2	Morenii Noi, Șicovăț	1,273	1,274
Negurenii Vechi	Ungheni	4	Negurenii Vechi, Coșeni, Țîghira, Zăzulenii Vechi	2,237	1,845
Petrești	Ungheni	3	Petrești, Medeleni, Petrești (loc. st. c. f.)	4,390	4,003
Pîrlița	Ungheni	2	Pîrlița, Hristoforovca	5,044	5,564
Sculeni	Ungheni	4	Sculeni, Blindești, Floreni, Gherman	5,470	4,750
Sinești	Ungheni	2	Sinești, Pojarna	1,379	1,099
Todirești	Ungheni	2	Todirești, Grăseni	4,263	4,125
Valea Mare	Ungheni	4	Valea Mare, Buzduganii de Jos, Buzduganii de Sus, Morenii Vechi	3,304	3,032
Zagarancea	Ungheni	3	Zagarancea, Elizavetovca, Semeni	3,523	3,299
Congazcicul de Sus	Găgăuzia	3	Congazcicul de Sus, Congazcicul de Jos, Dudulești	1,970	1,480
Etulia	Găgăuzia	3	Etulia, Etulia (loc. st. c. f.), Etulia Nouă	3,649	3,061
Svetlîi	Găgăuzia	2	Svetlîi, Alexeevca	2,271	1,622
Andreevca	Transnistria	3	Andreevca, Pîcalova, Șmalena		
Bîcioc	Transnistria	2	Bîcioc, Novovladimirovca		
Butor	Transnistria	2	Butor, India		
Caterinovca	Transnistria	2	Caterinovca, Sadchi		
Carmanova	Transnistria	4	Carmanova, Cotovca, Fedoseevca, Mocearovca		
Cobasna	Transnistria	3	Cobasna, Suhaia Rîbnița, Cobasna (loc. st. c. f.)		
Colosova	Transnistria	3	Colosova, Crasnaia Besarabia, Pobeda		
Comisarovca Nouă	Transnistria	4	Comisarovca Nouă, Bosca, Coșnița Nouă, Pohrebea Nouă		
Crasnencoe	Transnistria	3	Crasnencoe, Dimitrova, Ivanovca		
Crasnîi Octeabri	Transnistria	2	Crasnîi Octeabri, Alexandrovca		
Crasnîi Vinogradari	Transnistria	5	Crasnîi Vinogradari, Afanasievca, Alexandrovca Nouă, Calinovca, Lunga Nouă		
Cuzmin	Transnistria	2	Cuzmin, Voitovca		
Delacău	Transnistria	2	Delacău, Crasnaia Gorca		
Doibani I	Transnistria	3	Doibani I, Doibani II, Coicova		
Dubău	Transnistria	2	Dubău, Goianul Nou		
Frunză	Transnistria	7	Frunză, Andriașevca Nouă, Andriașevca Veche, Novocotovsc, Prioziornoe, Uiutnoe, Novosavițcaia st.		
Goian	Transnistria	2	Goian, Iagorlîc		
Hîrjău	Transnistria	3	Hîrjău, Mihailovca Nouă, Sărăței		
Hîrtop	Transnistria	4	Hîrtop, Bruslachi, Marian, Mocreachi		
Hrușca	Transnistria	2	Hrușca, Frunzăuca		
Lenin	Transnistria	4	Lenin, Pervomaisc, Pobeda, Stanislavca		
Mălăiești	Transnistria	2	Mălăiești, Cernița		
Mocra	Transnistria	4	Mocra, Basarabca, Șevcenco, Zaporojeț		
Ofatinți	Transnistria	2	Ofatinți, Novaia Jizni		
Podoima	Transnistria	2	Podoima, Podoimița		
Popencu	Transnistria	4	Popencu, Chirov, Vladimirovca, Zăzuleni		
Rașcov	Transnistria	2	Rașcov, Iantarnoe		
Rotari	Transnistria	3	Rotari, Bodeni, Socolovca		
Sovietscoe	Transnistria	2	Sovietscoe, Vasilievca		
Șipca	Transnistria	2	Șipca, Vesioloe		
Teiu	Transnistria	2	Teiu, Tocmagiu		
Ulmu	Transnistria	3	Ulmu, Ulmul Mic, Lîsaia Gora		
Vadul Turcului	Transnistria	2	Vadul Turcului, Molochișul Mic		
Valea Adîncă	Transnistria	2	Valea Adîncă, Constantinovca		
Vărăncău	Transnistria	3	Vărăncău, Buschi, Gherșunovca		
Vladimirovca	Transnistria	3	Vladimirovca, Constantinovca, Nicolscoe		

Former communes

Commune	District / Municipality / Autonomous unit	Nr. of villages	Villages	Population in 2004	Population in 2014	Notes
Budești	Chișinău	2	Budești, Văduleni	5,036	—	Discontinued in 2013. Văduleni village was merged into the town of Vadul lui Vodă
Chetriș	Fălești	2	Chetriș, Chetrișul Nou	1,697	1,482	Discontinued in 2025. Villages Chetriș and Chetrișul Nou were merger into the commune of Călinești, Fălești
Coșcalia	Căușeni	3	Coșcalia, Florica, Plop	2,799	—	Discontinued in 2011. Villages Florica and Plop were merged into the commune of Baccealia

== Notes ==
- The notation (loc. st. c. f.) denotes a locality-railway station (Romanian: localitate-stație de cale ferată), as is officially designed by the authorities.

== See also ==
- Administrative divisions of Moldova

== Bibliography ==
- "Populația pe naționalități și localități, în profil teritorial" (XLS) (in Romanian). Biroul Național de Statistică al Republicii Moldova. 2004.
- Results of Population and Housing Census in the Republic of Moldova in 2014: "Characteristics - Population (population by communes, religion, citizenship)" (XLS). National Bureau of Statistics of the Republic of Moldova. 2017.
