= Rogojeni =

Rogojeni may refer to several villages in Romania:

- Rogojeni, a village in Suceveni Commune, Galați County
- Rogojeni, a village in the town of Târgu Cărbuneşti, Gorj County

and to:

- Rogojeni, a commune in Şoldăneşti district, Moldova
