= Heciul =

Heciul may refer to one of two places in Sîngerei District, Moldova:

- Heciul Nou, a commune
- Heciul Vechi, a village in Alexăndreni Commune
