= Todirești =

Todireşti may refer to several places:

- Todirești, Iași, a commune in Iaşi County, Romania
- Todirești, Suceava, a commune in Suceava County, Romania
- Todirești, Vaslui, a commune in Vaslui County, Romania
- Todireşti, Ungheni, a commune in Ungheni district, Moldova
- Todireşti, a village in Chetrosu, Anenii Noi Commune, Anenii Noi district, Moldova
