= Crasnoarmeiscoe =

- Commune
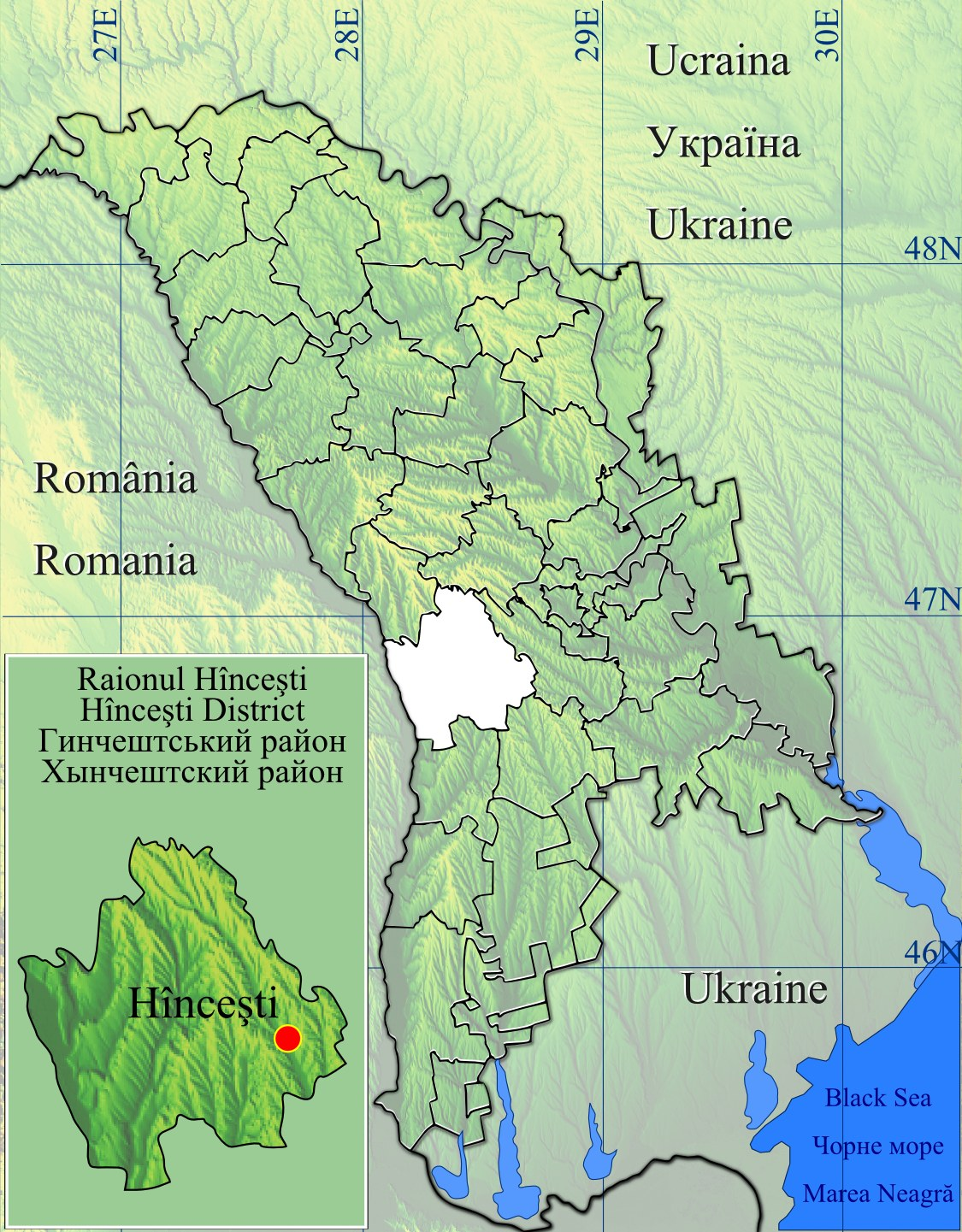
- Location within Hîncești
- Coordinates: 46°49′34″N 28°16′48″E
- Country: Moldova

Population (2014)
  - Total: 4,003
- Time zone: UTC+2 (EET)
  - Summer (DST): UTC+3 (EEST)
- Postal code: MD-3423

Crasnoarmeiscoe is a commune in Hînceşti District, Moldova. It is composed of two villages, Crasnoarmeiscoe and Tălăiești.
