= Chioselia =

- Commune
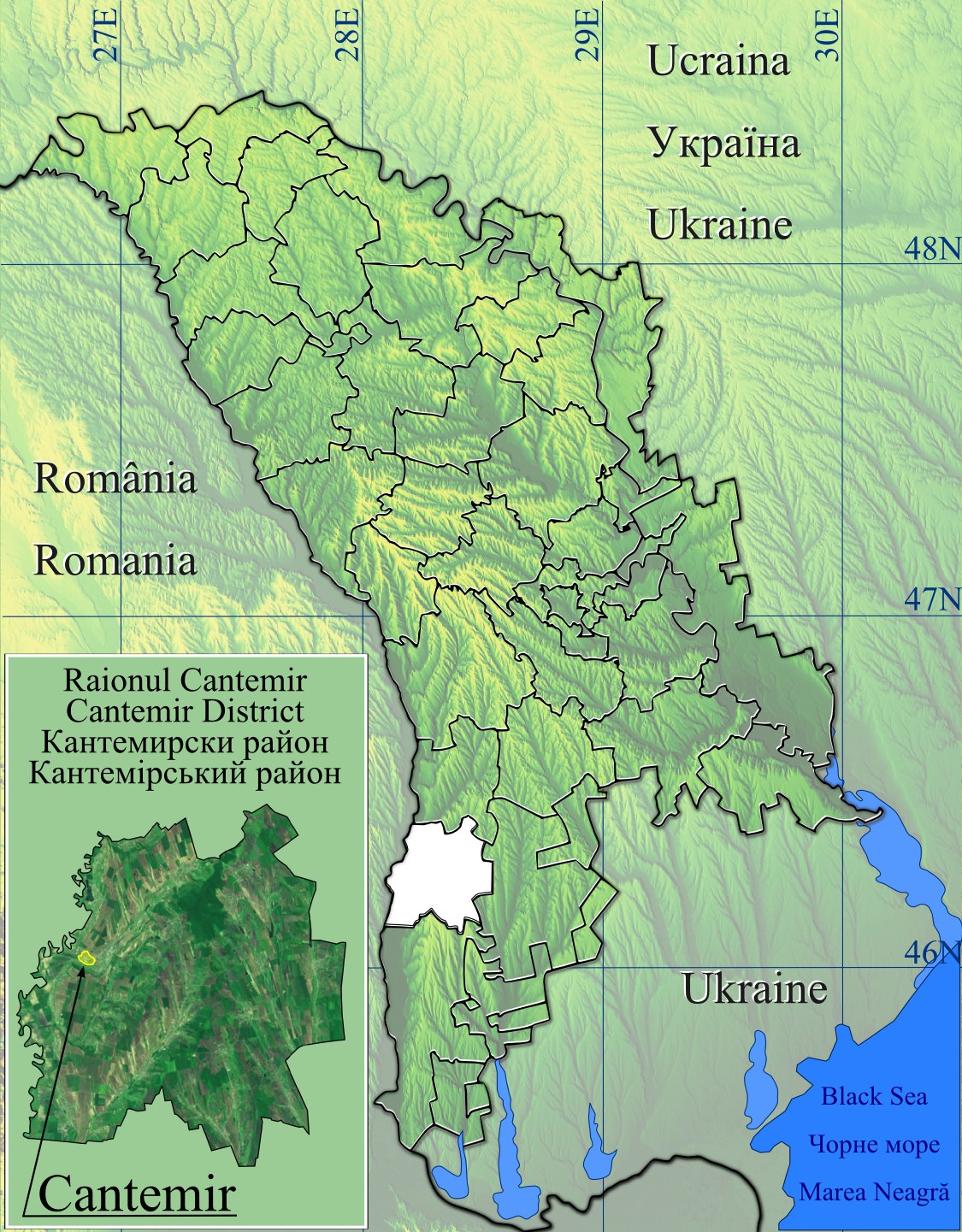
- Location within Cantemir
- Coordinates: 46°8′23″N 28°24′21″E
- Country: Moldova
- District: Chioselia

Government
  - Mayor: Brînzoi Gheorghe, Partidul Liberal, 2007
- Elevation: 137 m (449 ft)

Population (2014)
  - Total: 1,493
- Time zone: UTC+2 (EET)
  - Summer (DST): UTC+3 (EEST)
- Postal code: MD-7316

Chioselia is a commune in Cantemir District, Moldova. It is composed of two villages, Chioselia and Țărăncuța.
