= Ocolina =

- Commune
- Location within Moldova
- Coordinates: 48.1255555556°N 28.2630555556°E
- Country: Moldova
- District: Soroca District

Population (2014)
  - Total: 1,669
- Time zone: UTC+2 (EET)
  - Summer (DST): UTC+3 (EEST)

Ocolina is a commune in Soroca District, Moldova. It is composed of two villages, Ocolina and Țepilova.
