= Andreevca =

Andreevca Андреевка (Russian) Андріївка (Ukrainian)
- Commune
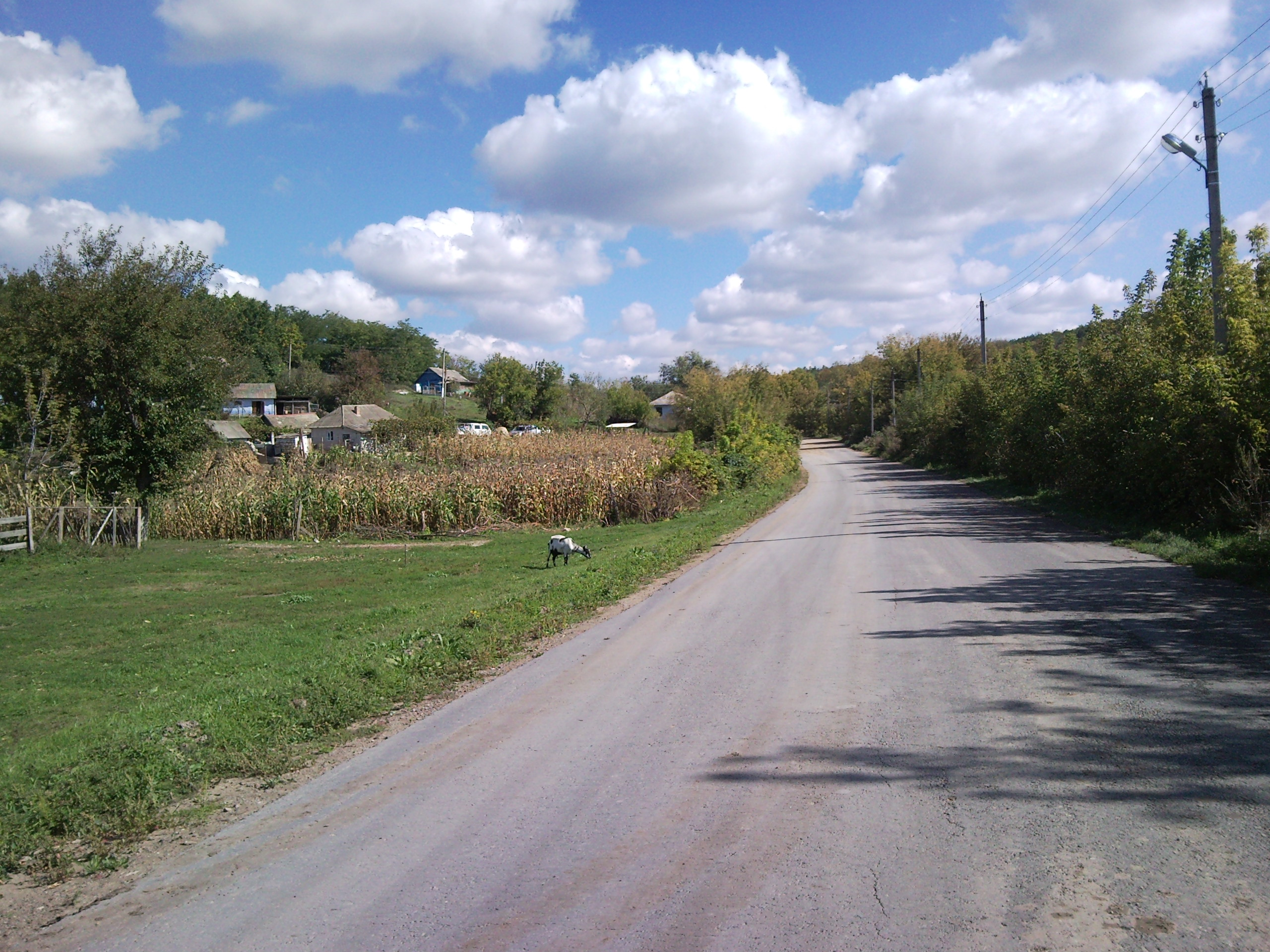

- Location within Moldova
- Coordinates: 47°45′41″N 29°9′38″E
- Country (de jure): Moldova
- Country (de facto): Transnistria (Note: Transnistria's political status is disputed. It considers itself to be an independent state, but this is not recognised by any UN member state. The Moldovan government and the international community consider Transnistria a part of Moldova's territory.)
- Elevation: 88 m (289 ft)
- Time zone: UTC+2 (EET)
  - Summer (DST): UTC+3 (EEST)

Andreevca (Moldovan Cyrillic and Russian: Андреевка, romanized: Andreyevka; Ukrainian: Андріївка, romanized: Andriyivka) is a commune in Transnistria, Moldova. It is composed of three villages: Andreevca, Pîcalova (Пикалово, Пыкалово) and Șmalena (Шмалена). It has since 1990 been administered as a part of the breakaway Pridnestrovian Moldavian Republic (PMR). According to the 2004 census, the population of the village was 633 inhabitants, of which 38 (6%) were Moldovans (Romanians), 553 (87.36%) Ukrainians and 25 (3.94%) Russians.
