= Climăuții de Jos =

- Commune
- Location within Moldova
- Coordinates: 47°57′N 28°48′E
- Country: Moldova
- District: Șoldănești District

Government
  - Mayor: Melnic Serghei (liberal)

Population (2014)
  - Total: 1,239
- Time zone: UTC+2 (EET)
  - Summer (DST): UTC+3 (EEST)

Climăuții de Jos is a commune in Șoldănești District, Moldova. It is composed of two villages, Climăuții de Jos and Cot.
