= Florițoaia Veche =

- Commune
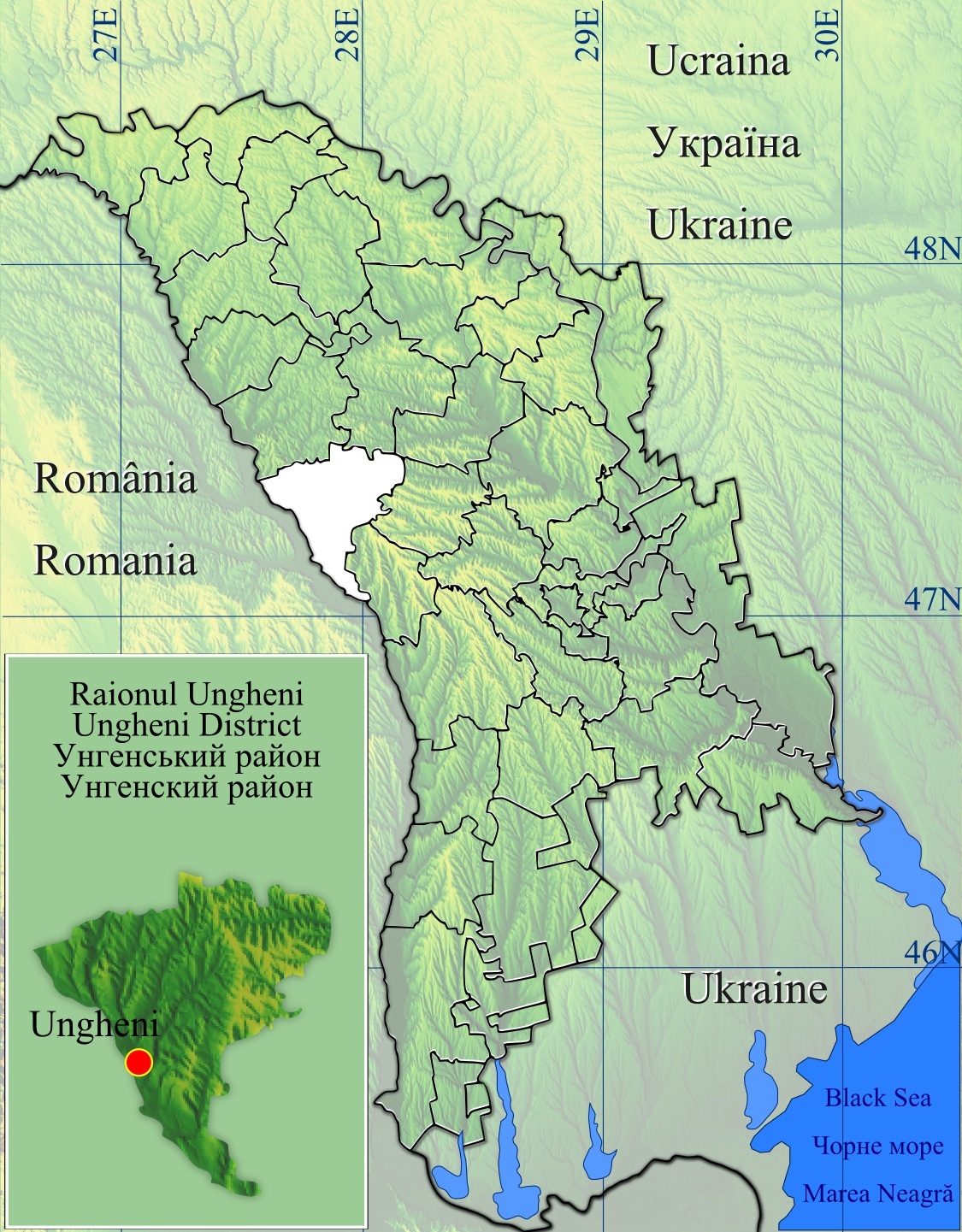
- Location within Ungheni
- Coordinates: 47°12′7″N 27°54′48″E
- Country: Moldova
- District: Ungheni District

Government
  - Mayor: Baban Margareta, 2007

Population (2014)
  - Total: 2,051
- Time zone: UTC+2 (EET)
  - Summer (DST): UTC+3 (EEST)
- Postal code: MD-3626

Florițoaia Veche is a commune in Ungheni District, Moldova. It is composed of three villages: Florițoaia Nouă, Florițoaia Veche and Grozasca.

West of Florițoaia Veche, there is a 245 metres tall guyed mast for FM-/TV-broadcasting.
