= Ialpujeni =

- Commune
- Location within Moldova
- Coordinates: 46.7044444444°N 28.6419444444°E
- Country: Moldova
- District: Cimișlia District

Government
  - Mayor: Burduh Vitalie. (2)

Population (2014)
  - Total: 1,401
- Time zone: UTC+2 (EET)
  - Summer (DST): UTC+3 (EEST)

Ialpujeni is a commune in Cimișlia District, Moldova. It is composed of two villages, Ialpujeni and Marienfeld, the latter called Pervomaisc during the Soviet period.
