= Beștemac =

- Commune
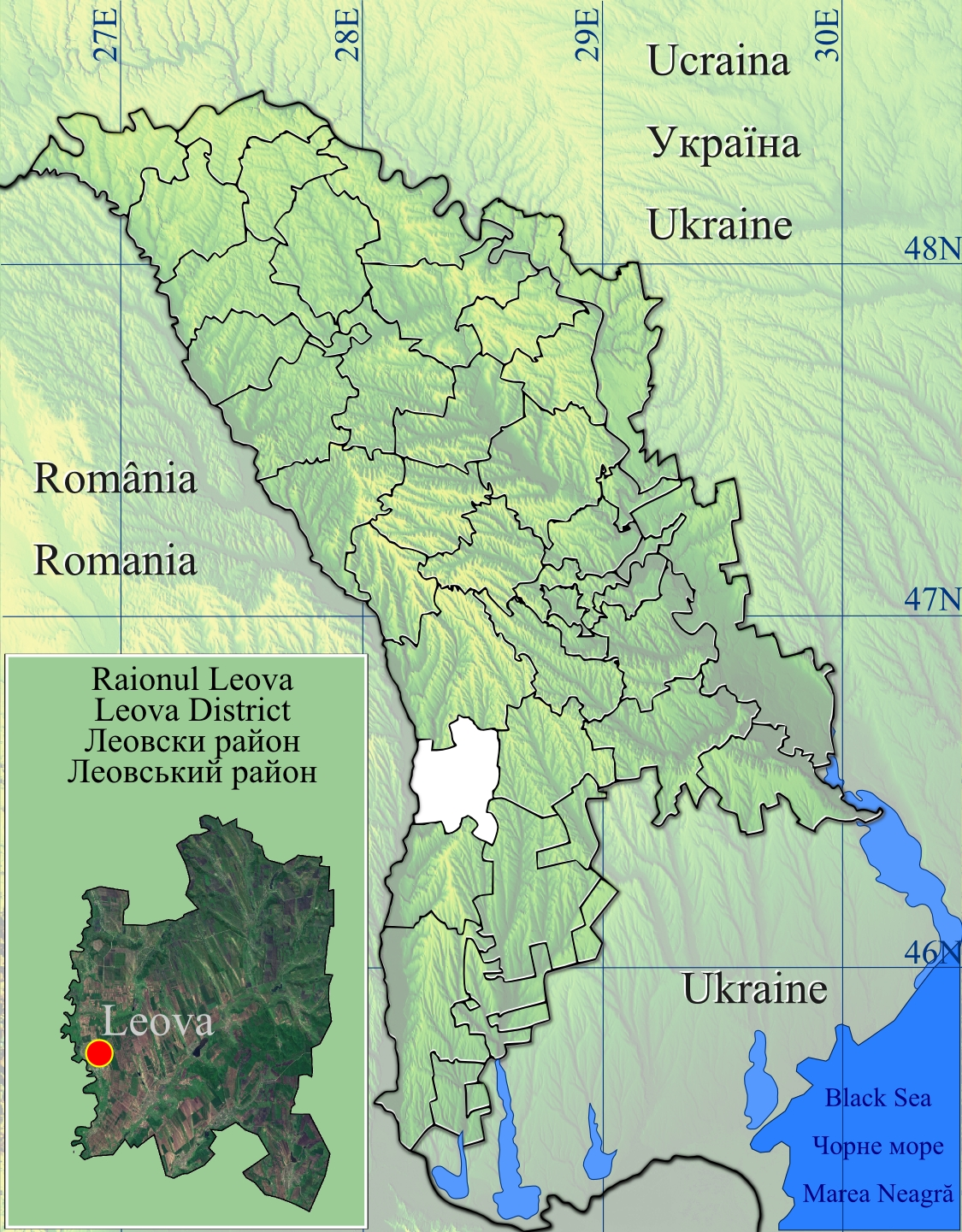
- Location within Moldova Leova
- Coordinates: 46°31′41″N 28°31′47″E
- Country: Moldova
- Elevation: 78 m (256 ft)

Population (2014)
  - Total: 832
- Time zone: UTC+2 (EET)
  - Summer (DST): UTC+3 (EEST)
- Postal code: 6312

Beștemac is a commune in Leova District, Moldova. It is composed of two villages, Beștemac and Pitești.
