= Drăgușenii Noi =

- Commune
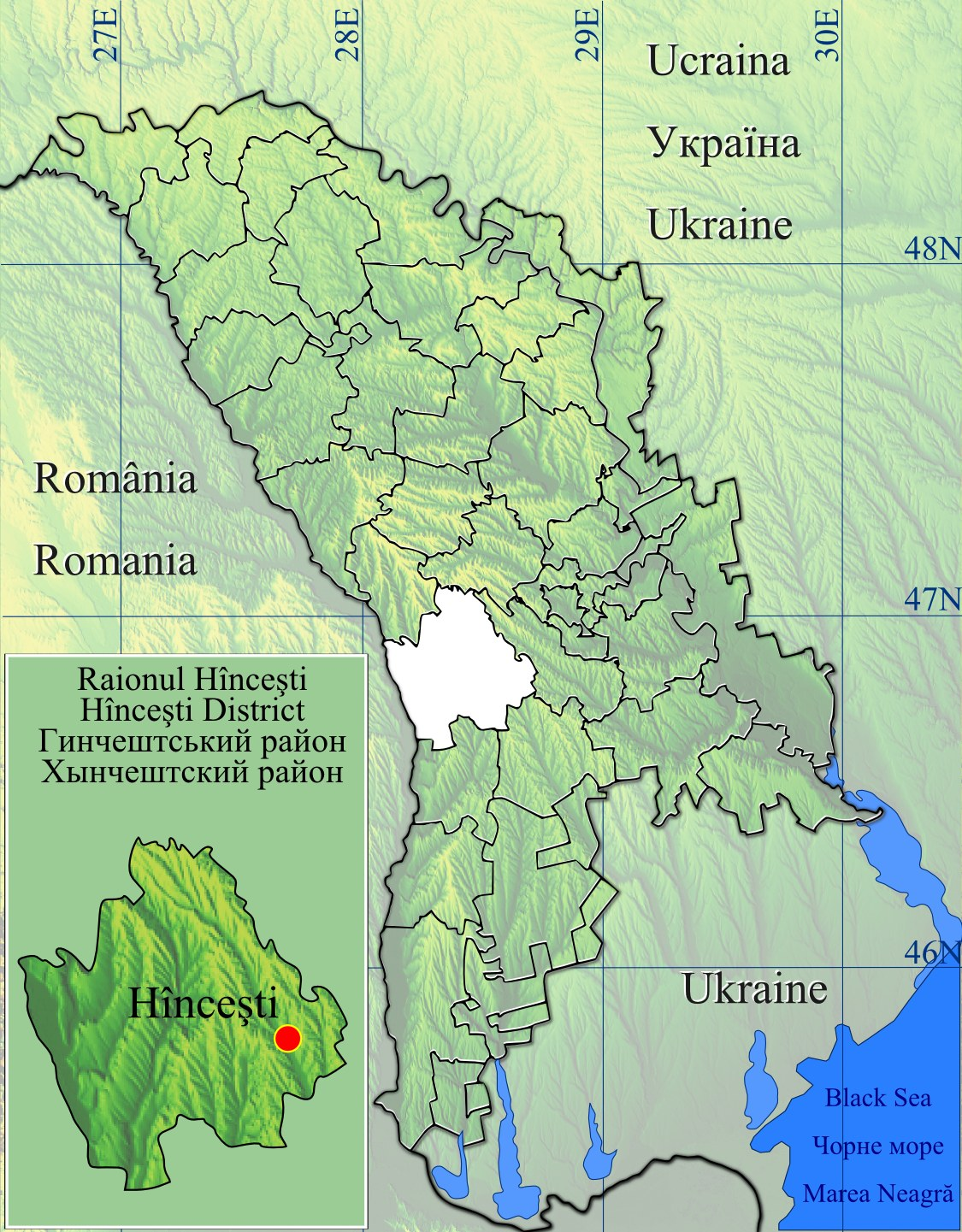
- Location within Hîncești
- Coordinates: 47°2′49″N 28°25′24″E
- Country: Moldova
- District: Hîncești District

Government
  - Mayor: Gonța Nicolae, 2007

Population (2014)
  - Total: 1,865
- Time zone: UTC+2 (EET)
  - Summer (DST): UTC+3 (EEST)
- Postal code: MD-6426

Drăgușenii Noi is a commune in Hînceşti District, Moldova. It is composed of two villages, Drăgușenii Noi and Horodca.
