= Pietrosu, Fălești =

Pietrosu
- Commune
- Location within Moldova
- Coordinates: 47.5008333333°N 27.9205555556°E
- Country: Moldova
- District: Fălești District

Government
  - Mayor: Gradinari Ghenadie (PSRM)
- Elevation: 182 m (597 ft)

Population (2014)
  - Total: 811
- Time zone: UTC+2 (EET)
  - Summer (DST): UTC+3 (EEST)

Pietrosu is a commune in Făleşti District, Moldova. It is composed of three villages: Măgura, Măgura Nouă and Pietrosu.
