= Șolcani =

- Commune
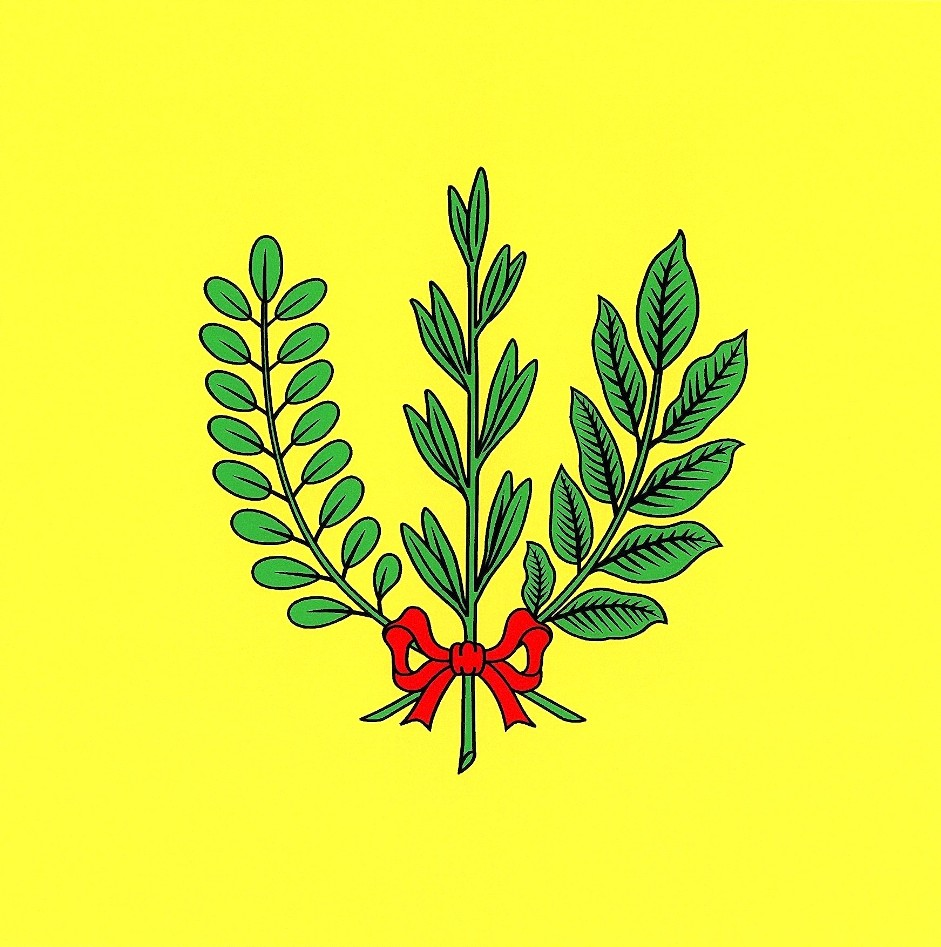
- Flag of Șolcani

- Location within Moldova
- Coordinates: 48.1733333333°N 28.1105555556°E
- Country: Moldova
- District: Soroca District

Population (2014)
  - Total: 1,408
- Time zone: UTC+2 (EET)
  - Summer (DST): UTC+3 (EEST)

Șolcani is a commune in Soroca District, Moldova. It is composed of two villages, Cureșnița Nouă and Șolcani.
