= Rotunda, Edineț =

Rotunda
- Commune
- Location within Edineț
- Coordinates: 48°14′32″N 27°18′33″E
- Country: Moldova
- District: Edineț District
- Elevation: 233 m (764 ft)

Population (2014)
  - Total: 1,120
- Time zone: UTC+2 (EET)
  - Summer (DST): UTC+3 (EEST)
- Postal code: MD-4638

Rotunda is a commune in Edineţ district, Moldova. It is composed of two villages, Hlinaia Mică and Rotunda.
