= Sărățica Nouă =

- Commune
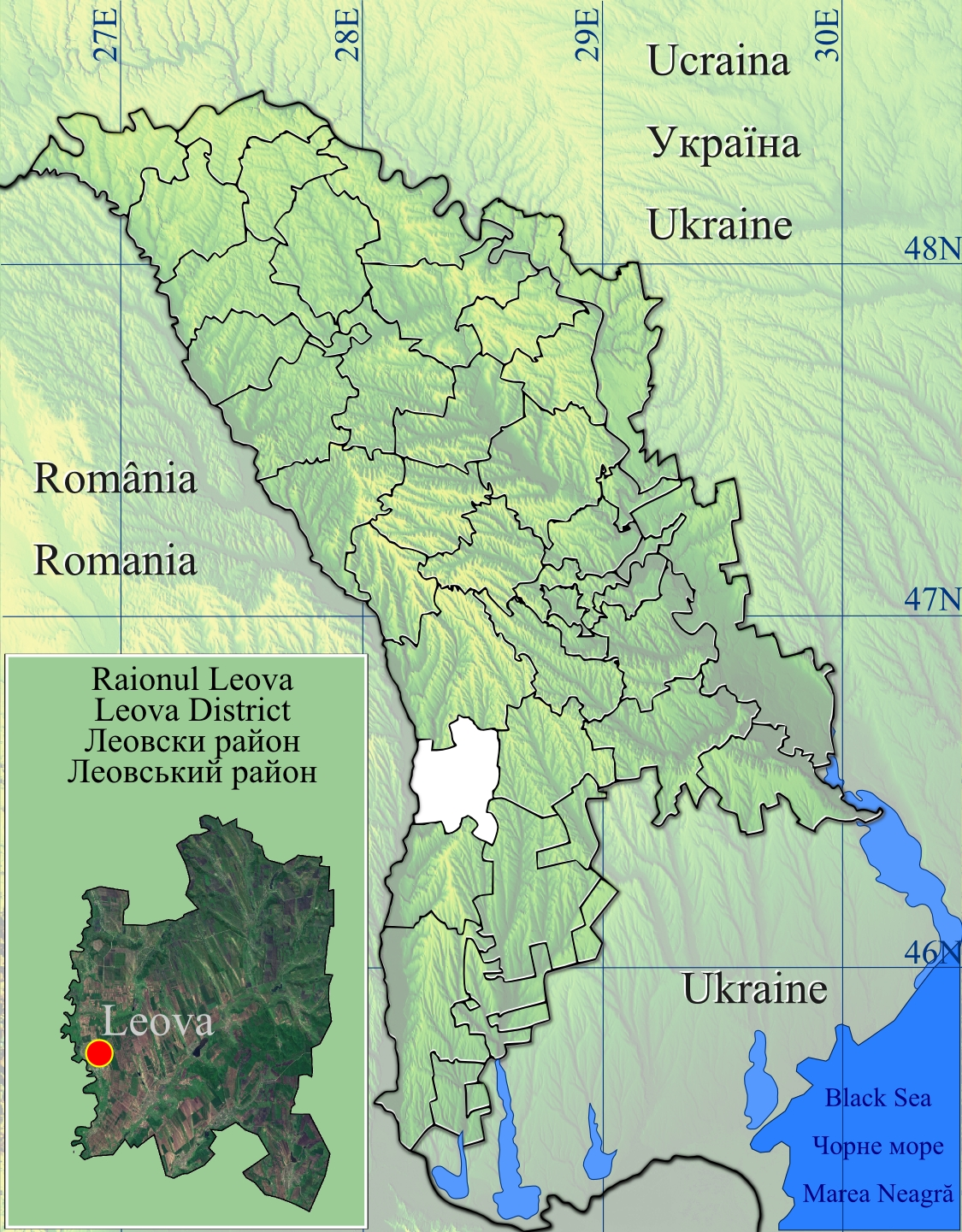
- Location within Moldova Leova
- Coordinates: 46°34′18″N 28°32′49″E
- Country: Moldova
- District: Leova District

Government
  - Mayor: Raevschi Mihail, PL 2007
- Elevation: 84 m (276 ft)

Population (2014)
  - Total: 935
- Time zone: UTC+2 (EET)
  - Summer (DST): UTC+3 (EEST)
- Postal code: MD-6327

Sărățica Nouă is a commune in Leova District, Moldova. It is composed of two villages, Cîmpul Drept and Sărățica Nouă.
