= Gălești, Strășeni =

Gălești
- Commune
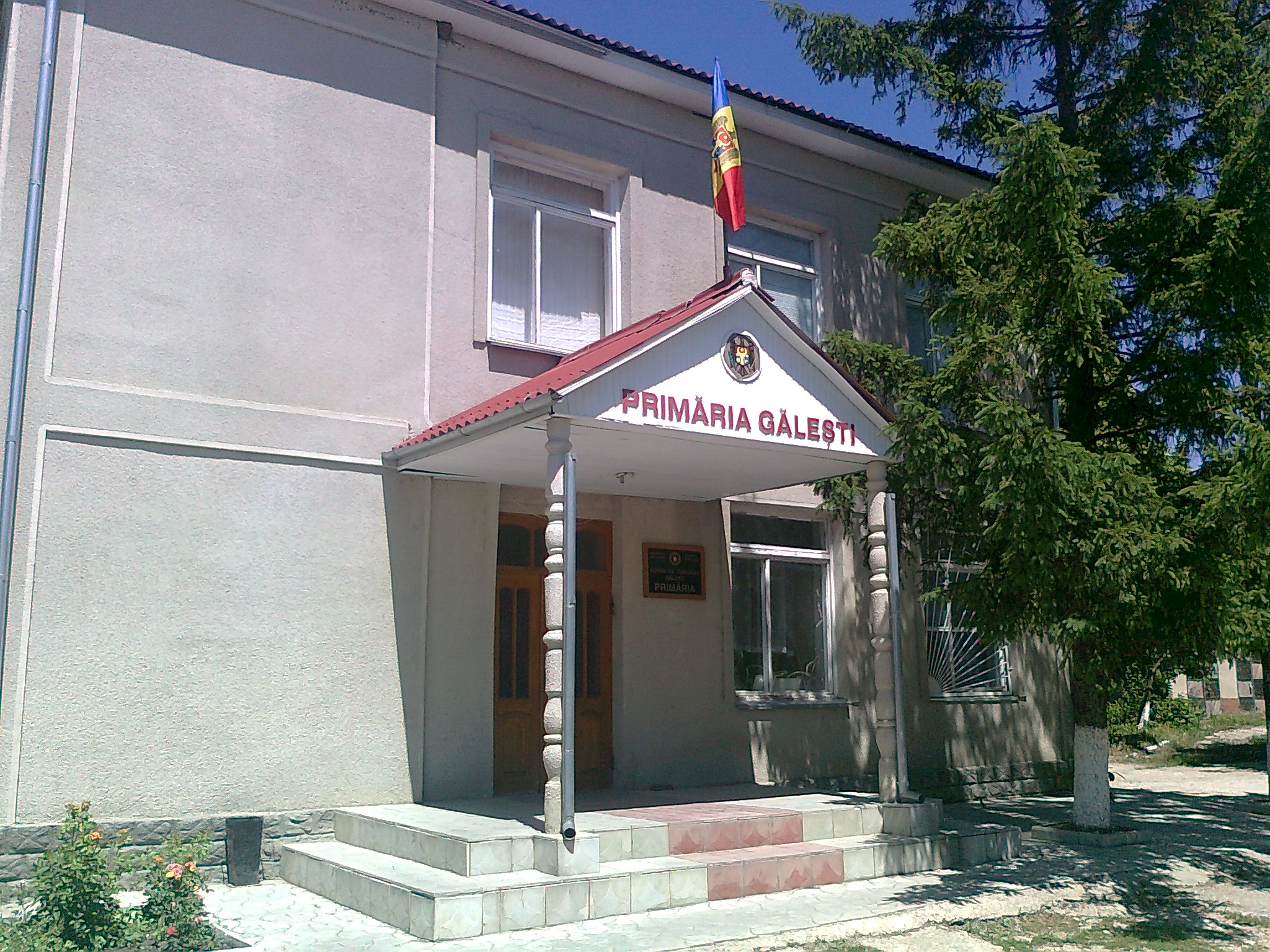

- Location within Moldova
- Country: Moldova
- District: Strășeni District

Population (2014)
  - Total: 2,675
- Time zone: UTC+2 (EET)
  - Summer (DST): UTC+3 (EEST)
- Postal code: MD-3717

Gălești is a commune in Strășeni District, Moldova. It is composed of two villages, Gălești and Găleștii Noi.
