= Pripiceni-Răzeși =

- Commune
- Location within Moldova
- Coordinates: 47.6852777778°N 28.7627777778°E
- Country: Moldova
- District: Rezina District

Population (2014)
  - Total: 1,069
- Time zone: UTC+2 (EET)
  - Summer (DST): UTC+3 (EEST)

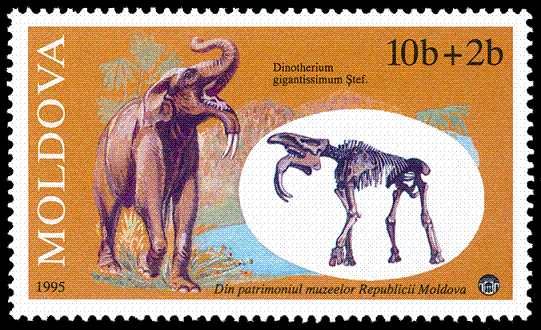
Dinotherium gigantissimum Ștef. The skeleton was found in 1966 near Pripiceni village. The first description of this animal was made by the scientist Grigoriu Ștefănescu (1836-1911).

Pripiceni-Răzeși is a commune in Rezina District, Moldova. It is composed of two villages, Pripiceni-Curchi and Pripiceni-Răzeși.
