= Schineni, Soroca =

SCHINENI
- Commune
- Location within Moldova
- Coordinates: 48.0944444444°N 28.0958333333°E
- Country: Moldova
- District: Soroca District

Population (2014)
  - Total: 1,432
- Time zone: UTC+2 (EET)
  - Summer (DST): UTC+3 (EEST)

Schineni is a commune in Soroca District, Moldova. It is composed of two villages, Schineni and Schinenii Noi.
