= Căinarii Vechi =

- Commune
- Location within Moldova
- Coordinates: 48.0080555556°N 28.125°E
- Country: Moldova

Population (2014)
  - Total: 2,672
- Time zone: UTC+2 (EET)
  - Summer (DST): UTC+3 (EEST)

Căinarii Vechi is a commune in Soroca District, Moldova. It is composed of two villages, Căinarii Vechi and Floriceni.
