= Iezărenii Vechi =

- Commune
- Location within Moldova
- Coordinates: 47°33′52″N 28°5′16″E
- Country: Moldova
- District: Sîngerei District

Government
  - Mayor: Renata Gabor (PLD)

Area
  - Total: 3,262 km^{2} (1,259 sq mi)

Population (2014)
  - Total: 1,773
- Time zone: UTC+2 (EET)
  - Summer (DST): UTC+3 (EEST)
- Postal code: 6227

Iezărenii Vechi is a commune in Sîngerei District, Moldova. It is composed of two villages, Iezărenii Noi and Iezărenii Vechi.
