= Suhuluceni =

- Commune
- Location within Moldova
- Coordinates: 47.4630555556°N 28.5233333333°E
- Country: Moldova
- District: Telenești
- Elevation: 77 m (253 ft)

Population (2014)
  - Total: 1,643
- Time zone: UTC+2 (EET)
  - Summer (DST): UTC+3 (EEST)
- Postal code: MD-5832

Suhuluceni is a commune in Teleneşti District, Moldova. It is composed of two villages, Ghermănești and Suhuluceni.
