= Volovița =

- Commune
- Location within Moldova
- Coordinates: 48.1030555556°N 28.3227777778°E
- Country: Moldova
- District: Soroca District

Population (2014)
  - Total: 1,851
- Time zone: UTC+2 (EET)
  - Summer (DST): UTC+3 (EEST)

Volovița is a commune in Soroca District, Moldova. It is composed of two villages, Alexandru cel Bun and Volovița.
