= Cneazevca =

- Commune
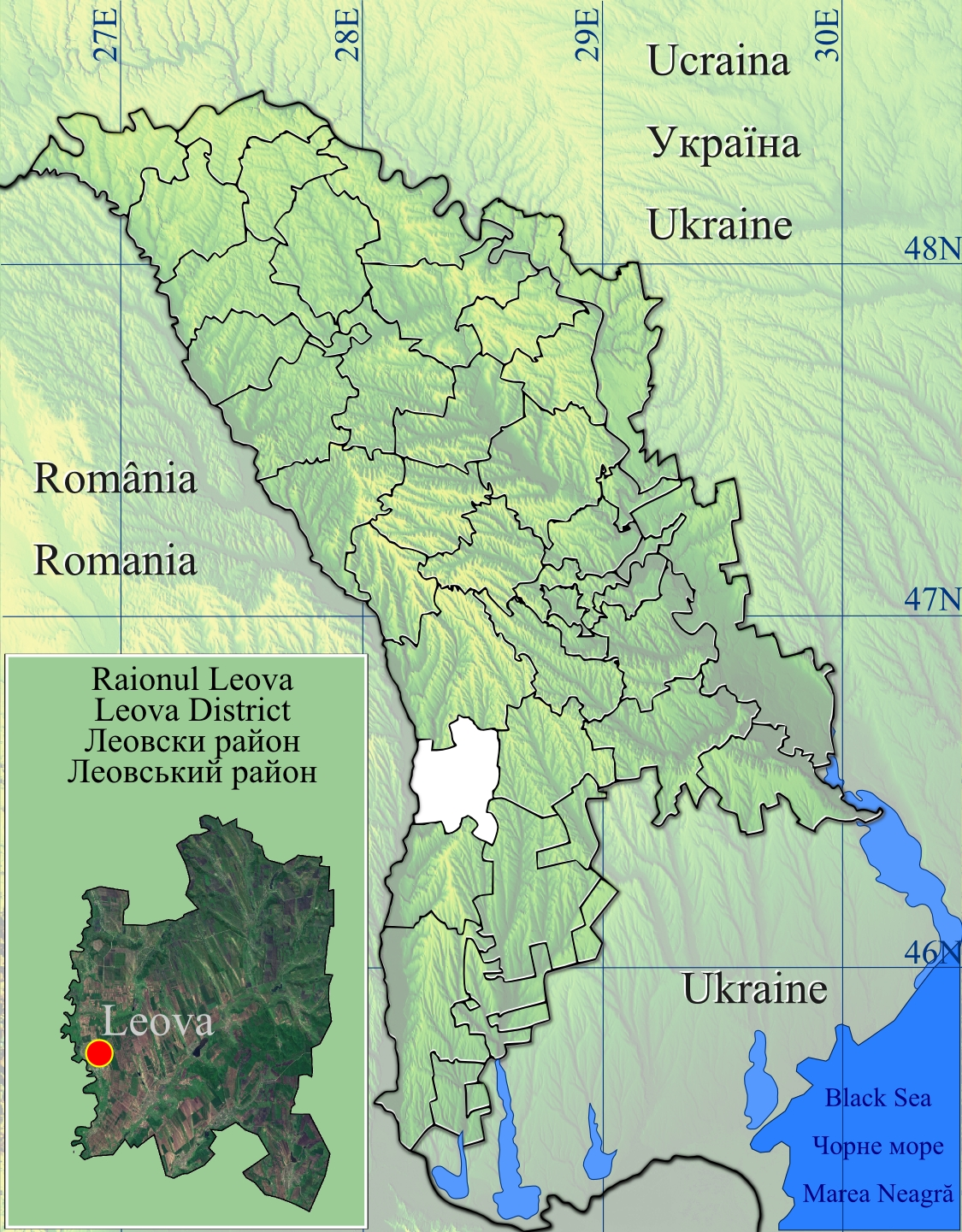
- Location within Moldova Leova
- Coordinates: 46°37′53″N 28°29′32″E
- Country: Moldova
- Elevation: 86 m (282 ft)

Population (2014)
  - Total: 841
- Time zone: UTC+2 (EET)
  - Summer (DST): UTC+3 (EEST)
- Postal code: MD-6315

Cneazevca is a commune in Leova District, Moldova. It is composed of two villages, Cîzlar and Cneazevca.
