= Cîietu =

- Commune
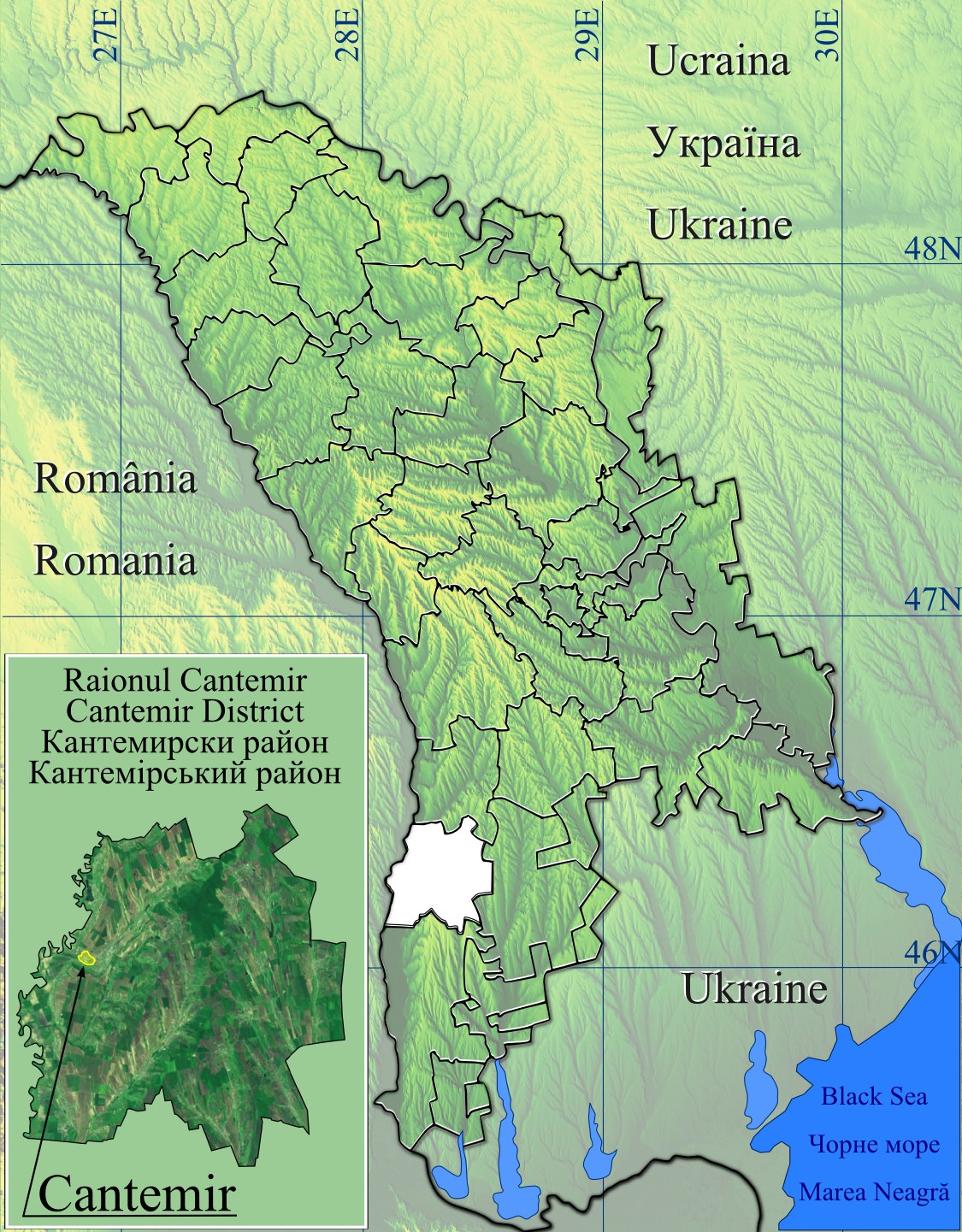
- Location within Cantemir
- Coordinates: 46°8′15″N 28°28′57″E
- Country: Moldova
- District: Cîietu

Government
  - Mayor: Raisa Drâmb, PPCD 2008

Area
  - Total: 2 km^{2} (0.77 sq mi)
- Elevation: 64 m (210 ft)

Population (2014)
  - Total: 1,211
- Time zone: UTC+2 (EET)
  - Summer (DST): UTC+3 (EEST)
- Postal code: MD-7317

Cîietu is a commune in Cantemir District, Moldova. It is composed of two villages, Cîietu and Dimitrova.
