= Dărcăuți =

- Commune
- Location within Moldova
- Coordinates: 48.2277777778°N 27.9808333333°E
- Country: Moldova
- District: Soroca District

Population (2014)
  - Total: 1,276
- Time zone: UTC+2 (EET)
  - Summer (DST): UTC+3 (EEST)

Dărcăuți is a commune in Soroca District, Moldova. It is composed of three villages: Dărcăuți, Dărcăuții Noi (depopulated as of 2014) and Mălcăuți.
