= Morenii Noi =

- Commune
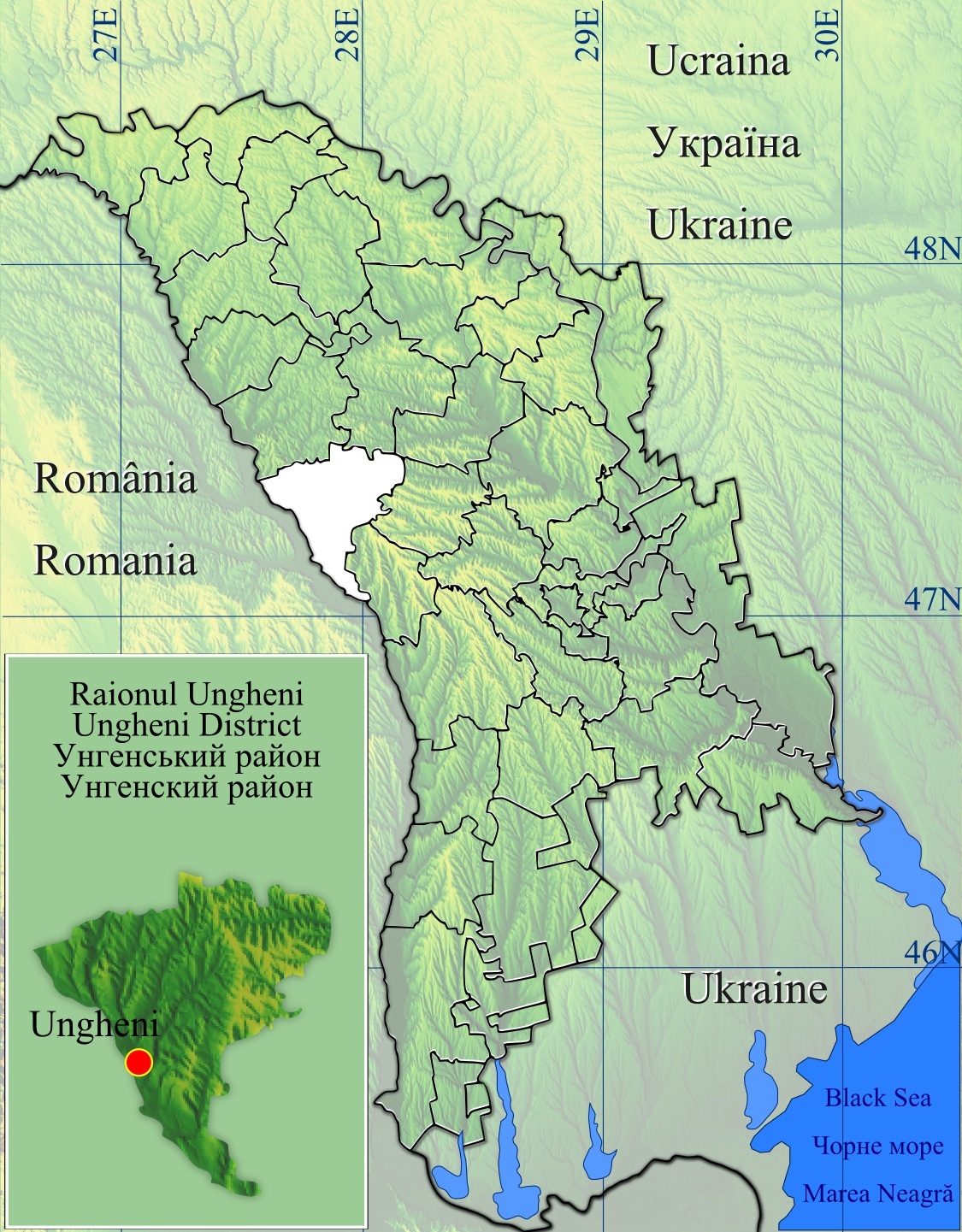
- Location within Ungheni
- Coordinates: 47°8′0″N 27°54′40″E
- Country: Moldova
- District: Comuna Morenii Noi

Government
  - Mayor: Mardari Ion, 2007

Population (2014)
  - Total: 1,274
- Time zone: UTC+2 (EET)
  - Summer (DST): UTC+3 (EEST)
- Postal code: MD-3637

Morenii Noi is a commune in Ungheni District, Moldova. It is composed of two villages, Morenii Noi and Șicovăț.
