= Mincenii de Jos =

- Commune
- Location within Moldova
- Coordinates: 47.6355555556°N 28.8813888889°E
- Country: Moldova
- District: Rezina District
- Elevation: 190 m (620 ft)

Population (2014)
  - Total: 641
- Time zone: UTC+2 (EET)
  - Summer (DST): UTC+3 (EEST)

Mîncenii de Jos is a commune in Rezina District, Moldova. It is composed of two villages, Mîncenii de Jos and Mîncenii de Sus.
