= Mirești =

- Commune
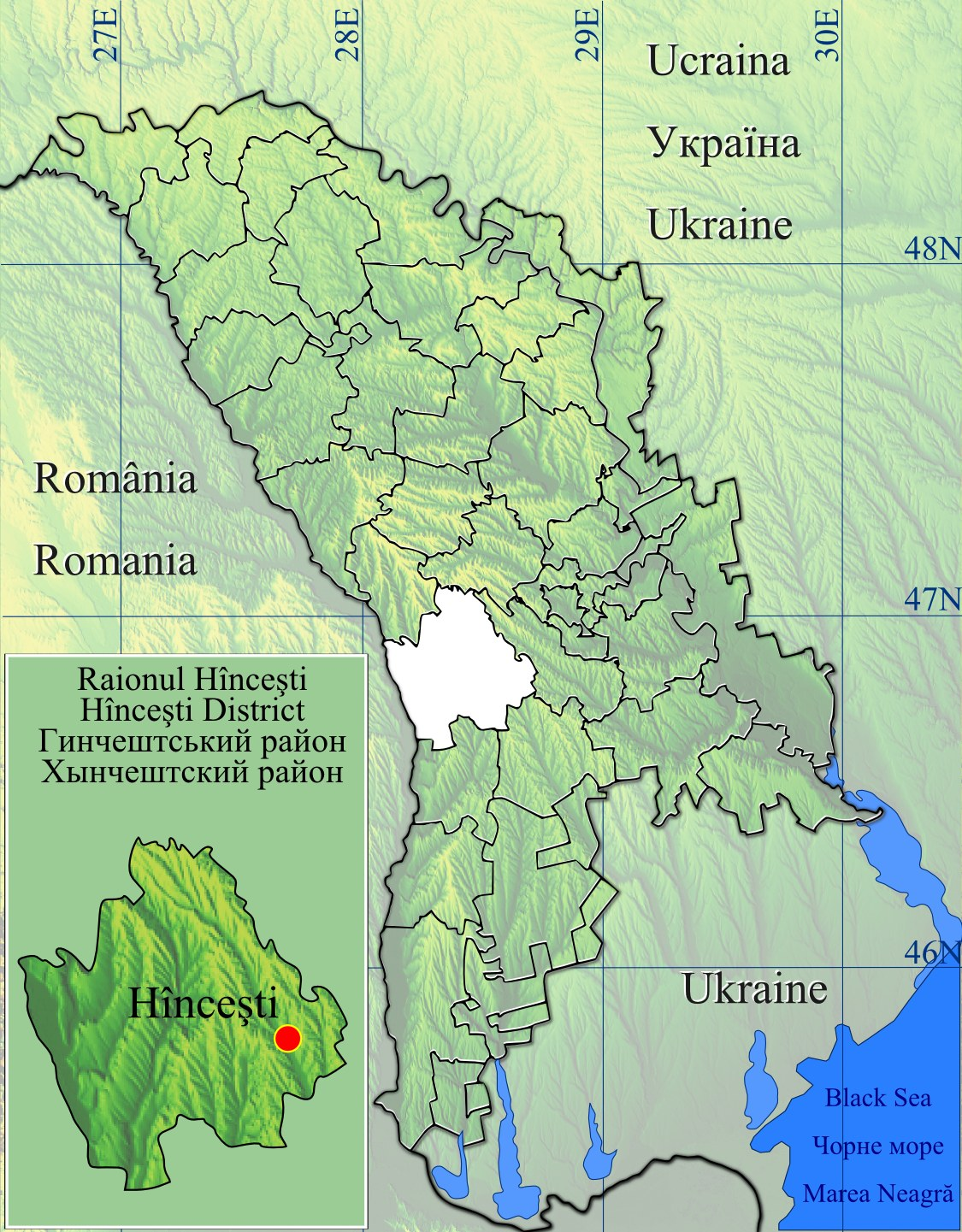
- Location within Hîncești
- Coordinates: 46°58′13″N 28°15′18″E
- Country: Moldova
- District: Hîncești District

Population (2014)
  - Total: 1,240
- Time zone: UTC+2 (EET)
  - Summer (DST): UTC+3 (EEST)
- Postal code: MD-3437

Mirești is a commune in Hînceşti District, Moldova. It is composed of two villages, Chetroșeni and Mirești.
