= Țibirica =

- Commune
- Location within Moldova
- Coordinates: 47.3730555556°N 28.3716666667°E
- Country: Moldova
- District: Călărași District

Government
  - Mayor: Iacob Prascurov (PLDM)

Population (2014 census)
  - Total: 2,169
- Time zone: UTC+2 (EET)
  - Summer (DST): UTC+3 (EEST)

Țibirica is a commune in Călărași District, Moldova. It is composed of two villages, Schinoasa and Țibirica.
