= Egorovca =

- Commune
- Location within Moldova
- Coordinates: 47.6161111111°N 27.7625°E
- Country: Moldova
- District: Fălești District
- Elevation: 134 m (440 ft)

Population (2014)
  - Total: 1,698
- Time zone: UTC+2 (EET)
  - Summer (DST): UTC+3 (EEST)
- Postal code: MD-5921

Egorovka is a commune in the Republic of Moldova. It was formed between 1918 and 1919. The village was populated mainly by residents of the village of Novye Hrubny. In the fall of 1919, 50-56 houses were built. By 1941, there were already 200-210 houses in the village. Egorovka today is in the Fălești District and consists of three villages: Chuluk, Yegorovka and Catranîc station. The village of Yegorovka hosts a community ensemble called "Molodushka" (created in 1974).
