= Sinești, Ungheni =

Sinești
- Commune
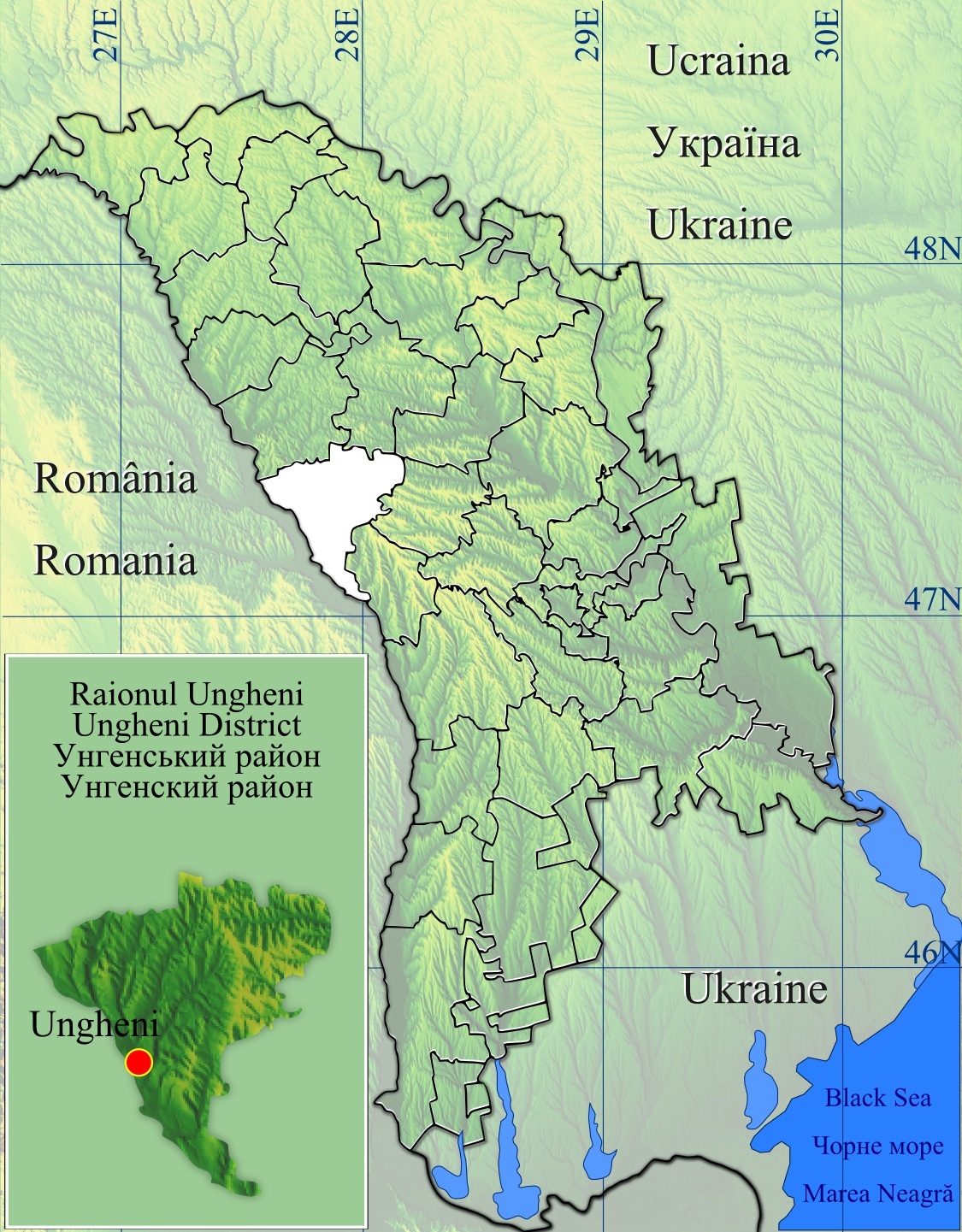
- Location within Ungheni
- Coordinates: 47°23′46″N 28°3′5″E
- Country: Moldova
- District: Ungheni District

Government
  - Mayor: Iurie Țăruș

Population (2014)
  - Total: 1,099
- Time zone: UTC+2 (EET)
  - Summer (DST): UTC+3 (EEST)
- Postal code: MD-3646

Sinești is a commune in Ungheni District, Moldova. It is composed of two villages, Pojarna and Sinești.
