= Prajila =

- Commune
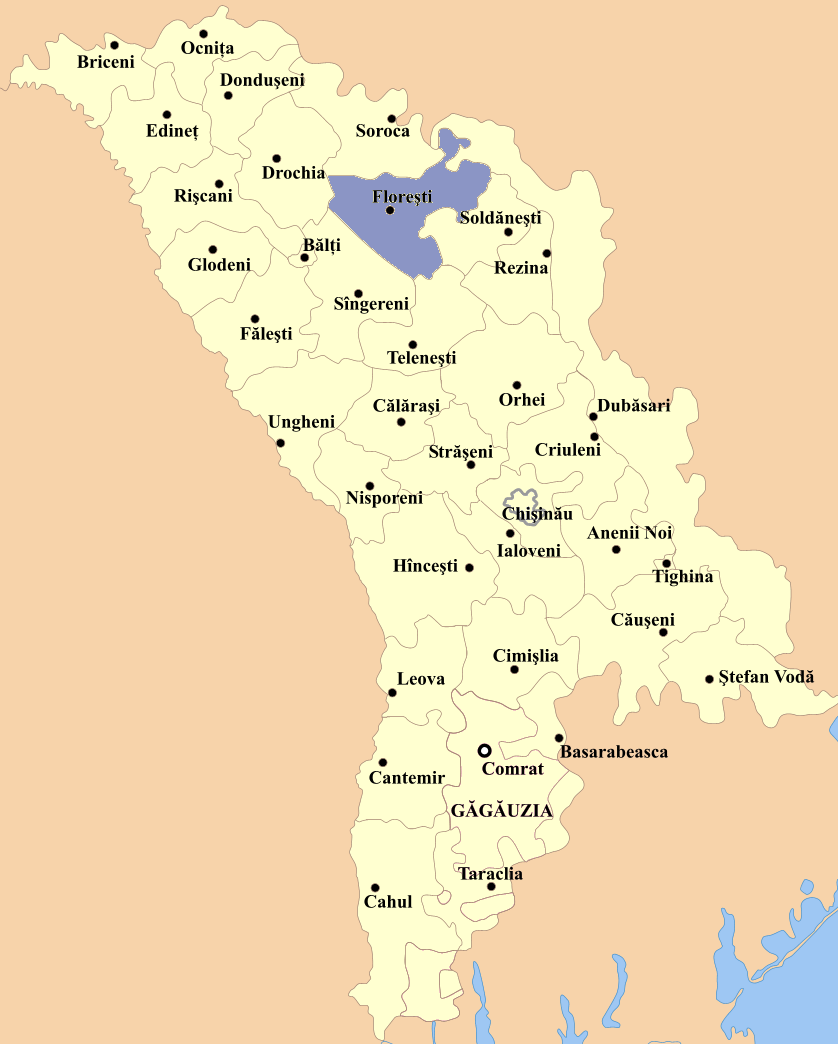

- Location within Moldova
- Coordinates: 47.8402777778°N 28.21°E
- Country: Moldova
- District: Florești District

Government
  - Mayor: Cobâlaș Petru (Partidul Nostru)

Population (2014)
  - Total: 2,574
- Time zone: UTC+2 (EET)
  - Summer (DST): UTC+3 (EEST)

Prajila is a commune in Floreşti District, Moldova. It is composed of four villages: Antonovca, Frunzești, Mihailovca and Prajila.
