= Ciuciuieni =

- Commune
- Location within Moldova
- Coordinates: 47.5558333333°N 28.1316666667°E
- Country: Moldova
- District: Sîngerei District

Government
  - Mayor: Butnariuc Ion (inginer-electric) Partid =PPR

Population (2014)
  - Total: 1,176
- Time zone: UTC+2 (EET)
  - Summer (DST): UTC+3 (EEST)
- Website: gmzciuciuieni@.ru

Ciuciuieni is a commune in Sîngerei District, Moldova. It is composed of two villages, Brejeni and Ciuciuieni.
