= Greblești =

- Commune
- Location within Moldova
- Coordinates: 47.2433333333°N 28.6119444444°E
- Country: Moldova
- District: Strășeni District

Population (2014)
  - Total: 672
- Time zone: UTC+2 (EET)
  - Summer (DST): UTC+3 (EEST)

Greblești is a commune in Strășeni District, Moldova. It is composed of two villages, Greblești and Mărtinești.
