= Cotiujenii Mici =

- Commune
- Location within Moldova
- Coordinates: 47.7025°N 28.3080555556°E
- Country: Moldova
- District: Sîngerei

Population (2014)
  - Total: 1,671
- Time zone: UTC+2 (EET)
  - Summer (DST): UTC+3 (EEST)

Cotiujenii Mici is a commune in Sîngerei District, Moldova. It is composed of three villages: Alexeuca, Cotiujenii Mici and Gura-Oituz.
