= Bulboci =

- Commune
- Location within Moldova
- Coordinates: 48.0397222222°N 28.0838888889°E
- Country: Moldova
- District: Soroca

Population (2014)
  - Total: 1,970
- Time zone: UTC+2 (EET)
  - Summer (DST): UTC+3 (EEST)

Bulboci is a commune in Soroca District, Moldova. It is composed of two villages, Bulboci and Bulbocii Noi.
