= Bilicenii Vechi =

- Commune
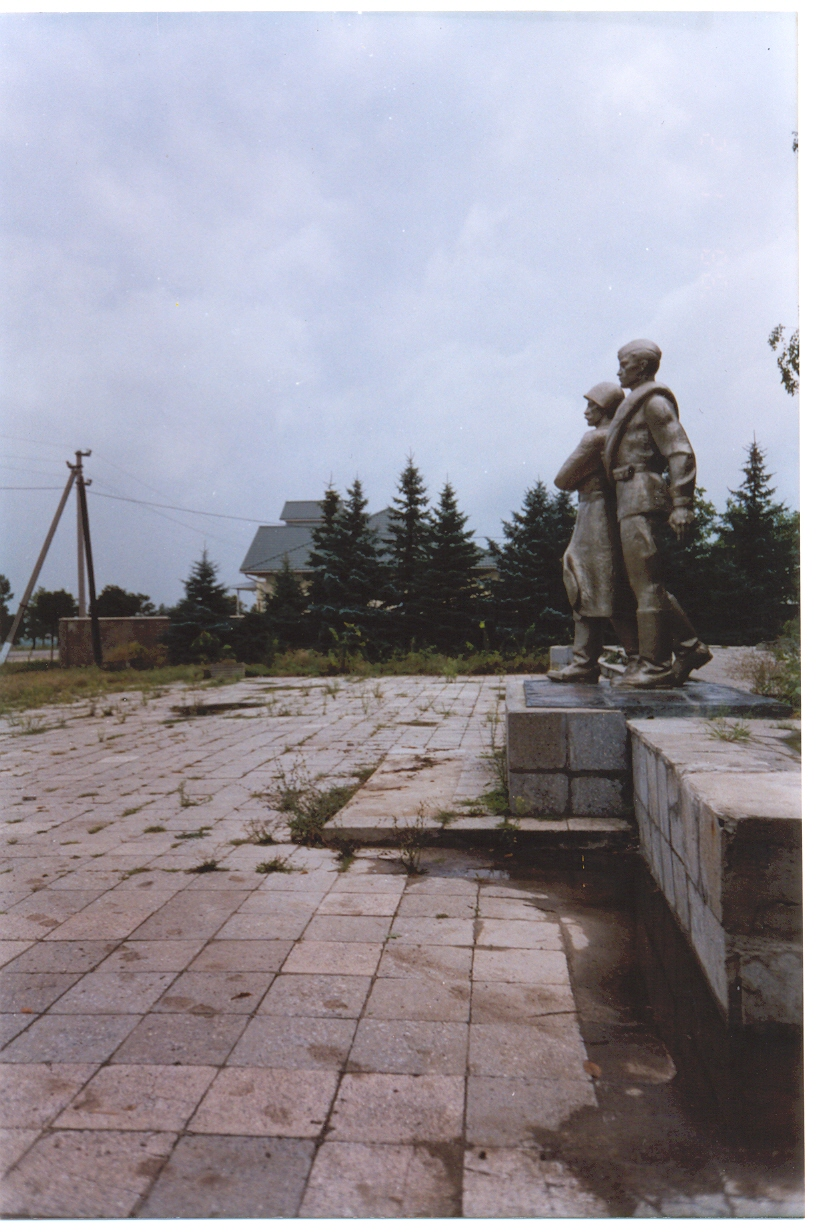

- Location within Moldova
- Coordinates: 47.655°N 28.0458333333°E
- Country: Moldova
- District: Sîngerei District

Government
  - Mayor: Alexei Cozma (1999-prezent)

Population (2014)
  - Total: 3,252
- Time zone: UTC+2 (EET)
  - Summer (DST): UTC+3 (EEST)

Bilicenii Vechi is a commune in Sîngerei District, Moldova. It is composed of two villages, Bilicenii Vechi and Coada Iazului.
