= Lencăuți =

- Commune
- Location within Moldova
- Coordinates: 48.4352777778°N 27.6505555556°E
- Country: Moldova
- District: Ocnița District

Population (2014)
  - Total: 1,681
- Time zone: UTC+2 (EET)
  - Summer (DST): UTC+3 (EEST)

Lencăuți is a commune in Ocnița District, Moldova. It is composed of two villages, Lencăuți and Verejeni.
