= Dobrogea Veche =

- Commune
- Location within Moldova
- Coordinates: 47.8336111111°N 27.9366666667°E
- Country: Moldova
- District: Sîngerei District

Population (2014)
  - Total: 1,685
- Time zone: UTC+2 (EET)
  - Summer (DST): UTC+3 (EEST)

Dobrogea Veche is a commune in Sîngerei District, Moldova. It is composed of three villages: Cotovca, Dobrogea Nouă and Dobrogea Veche.
