= Bălășești, Sîngerei =

Bălășești
- Commune
- Location within Moldova
- Coordinates: 47.66°N 28.3547222222°E
- Country: Moldova
- District: Sîngerei

Government
  - Mayor: Chetrari Gheorghe
- Elevation: 136 m (446 ft)

Population (2014)
  - Total: 2,318
- Time zone: UTC+2 (EET)
  - Summer (DST): UTC+3 (EEST)

Bălășești is a commune in Sîngerei District, Moldova. It is composed of two villages, Bălășești and Sloveanca.
