= Logofteni =

- Commune
- Location within Moldova
- Coordinates: 47.6258333333°N 27.5697222222°E
- Country: Moldova
- District: Fălești District

Population (2014)
  - Total: 1,137
- Time zone: UTC+2 (EET)
  - Summer (DST): UTC+3 (EEST)

Logofteni is a commune in Fălești District, Moldova. It is composed of two villages, Logofteni and Moldoveanca.
