= Marinici, Nisporeni =

Marinici
- Commune
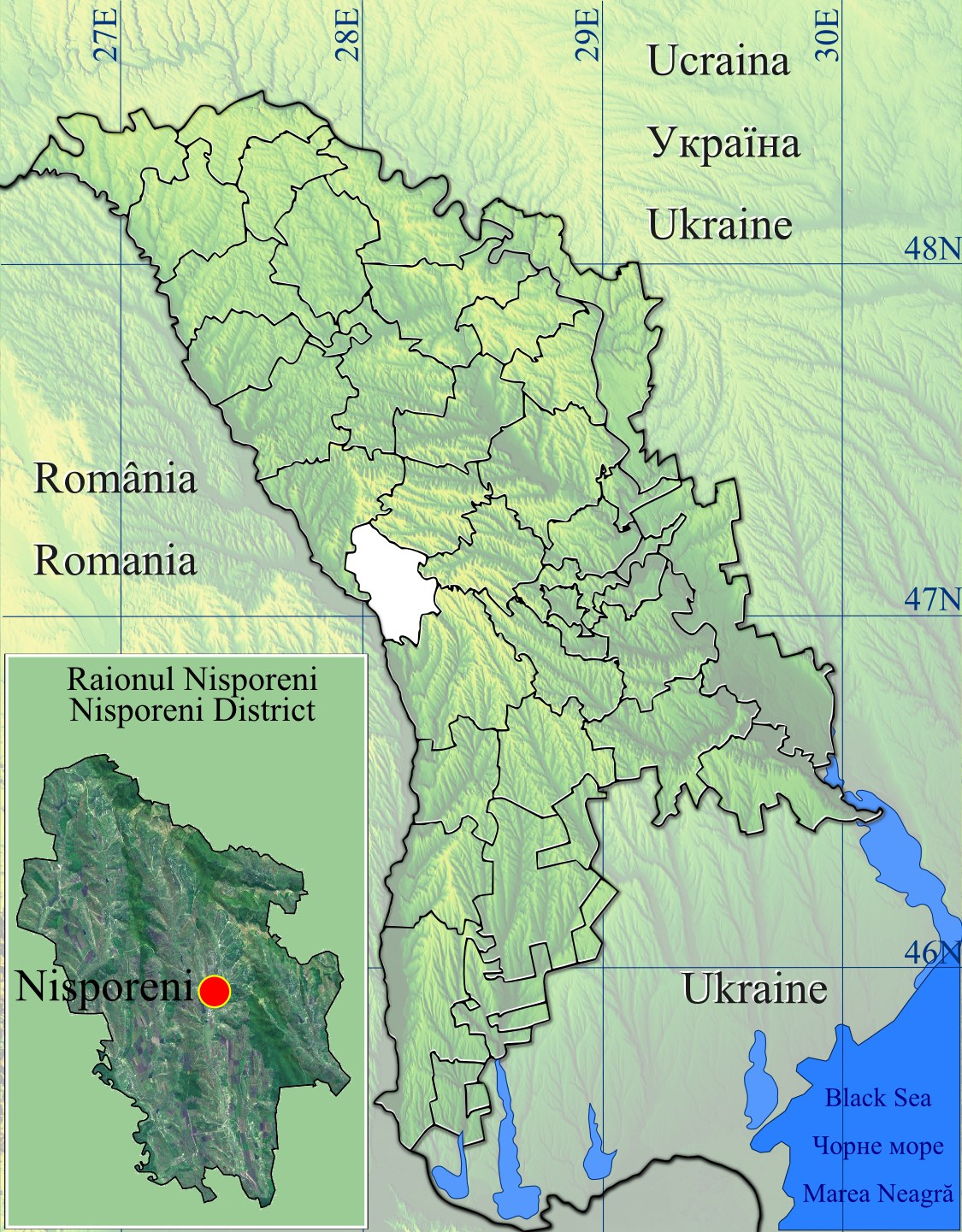
- Location within Nisporeni
- Coordinates: 46°58′5″N 28°9′52″E
- Country: Moldova
- Elevation: 98 m (322 ft)

Population (2014)
  - Total: 4,192
- Time zone: UTC+2 (EET)
  - Summer (DST): UTC+3 (EEST)
- Postal code: MD-6430

Marinici is a commune in Nisporeni District, Moldova. It is composed of two villages, Heleșteni and Marinici.
