= Pompa =

- Commune
- Location within Moldova
- Coordinates: 47.6538888889°N 27.9425°E
- Country: Moldova
- District: Fălești District

Population (2014)
  - Total: 1,035
- Time zone: UTC+2 (EET)
  - Summer (DST): UTC+3 (EEST)

Pompa is a commune in Făleşti District, Moldova. It is composed of three villages: Pervomaisc, Pompa and Suvorovca.
