= Șișcani, Nisporeni =

Șișcani
- Commune
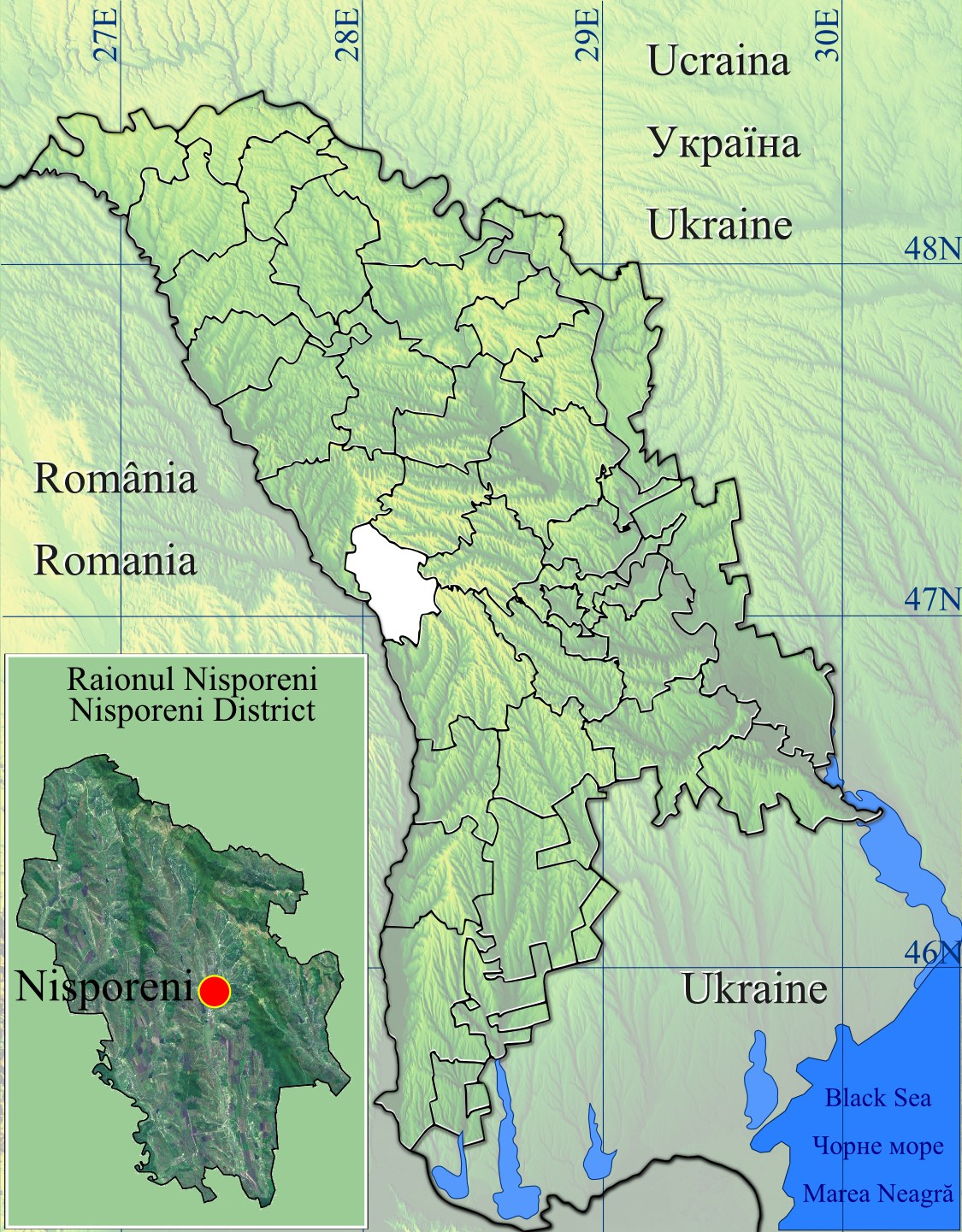
- Location within Nisporeni
- Coordinates: 46°58′14″N 28°12′55″E
- Country: Moldova
- District: Nisporeni District
- Elevation: 97 m (318 ft)

Population (2014)
  - Total: 2,217
- Time zone: UTC+2 (EET)
  - Summer (DST): UTC+3 (EEST)
- Postal code: MD-6437

Șișcani is a commune in Nisporeni District, Moldova. It is composed of three villages: Drojdieni, Odaia and Șișcani.
