= Gălășeni, Rîșcani =

Gălășeni
- Commune
- Location within Moldova
- Coordinates: 47.8666666667°N 27.35°E
- Country: Moldova
- District: Rîșcani District

Government
  - Mayor: Catalina Cucu (PLDM)

Population (2014)
  - Total: 1,533
- Time zone: UTC+2 (EET)
  - Summer (DST): UTC+3 (EEST)

Gălășeni is a commune in Rîșcani District, Moldova. It is composed of two villages, Gălășeni and Mălăiești.
