= Rublenița =

- Commune
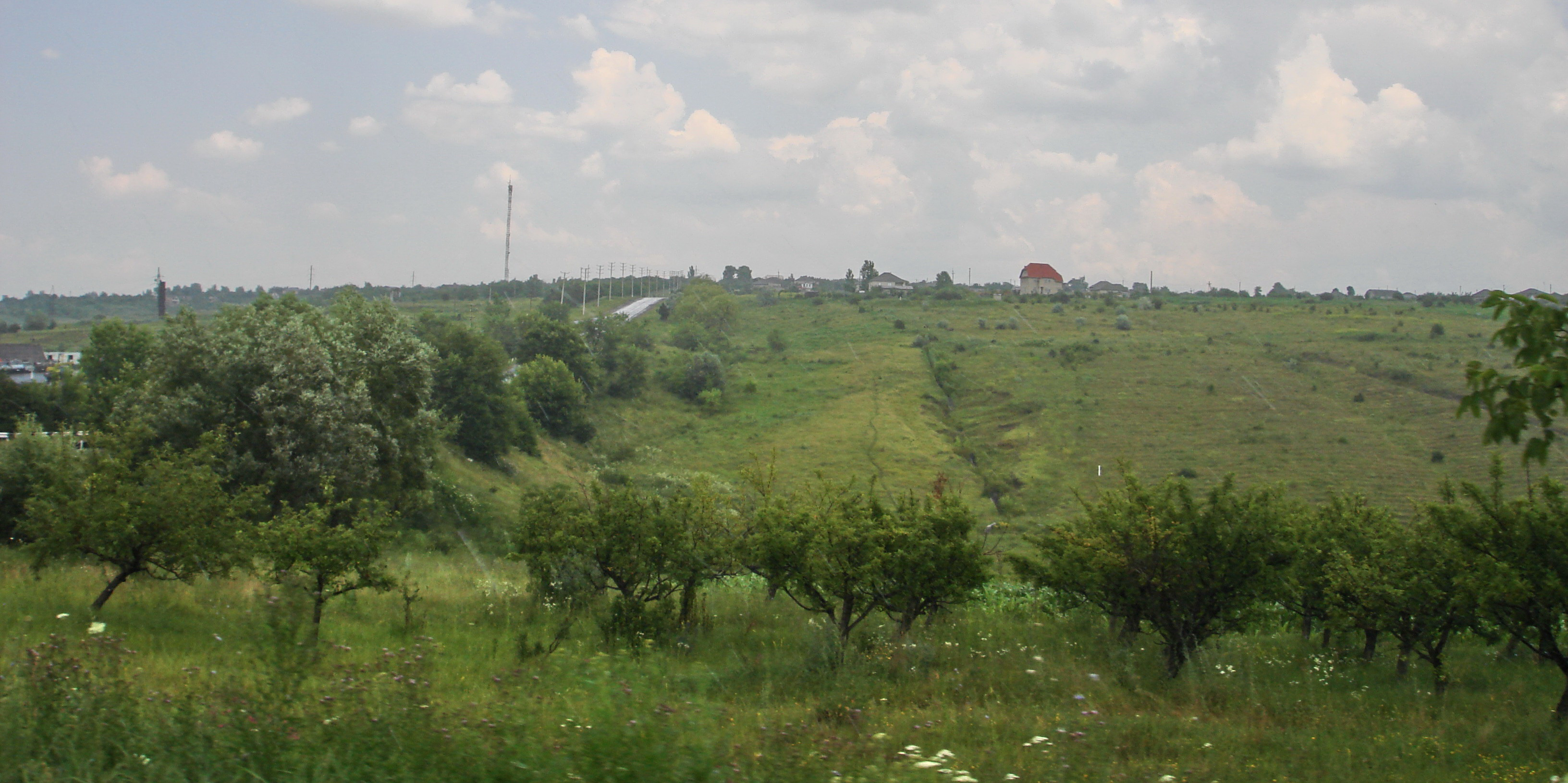

- Location within Moldova
- Coordinates: 48.1683333333°N 28.2144444444°E
- Country: Moldova
- District: Soroca District

Population (2014)
  - Total: 3,275
- Time zone: UTC+2 (EET)
  - Summer (DST): UTC+3 (EEST)

Rublenița is a commune in Soroca District, Moldova. It is composed of two villages, Rublenița and Rublenița Nouă.
