= Duruitoarea Nouă =

- Commune
- Location within Moldova
- Coordinates: 47.9°N 27.25°E
- Country: Moldova
- District: Rîșcani District

Government
  - Mayor: Lidia Dîncenoc

Population (2014)
  - Total: 848
- Time zone: UTC+2 (EET)
  - Summer (DST): UTC+3 (EEST)

Duruitoarea Nouă is a commune in Rîșcani District, Moldova. It is composed of two villages, Dumeni and Duruitoarea Nouă.

== Gallery ==
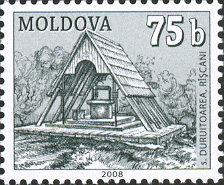
