= Brătuleni =

- Commune
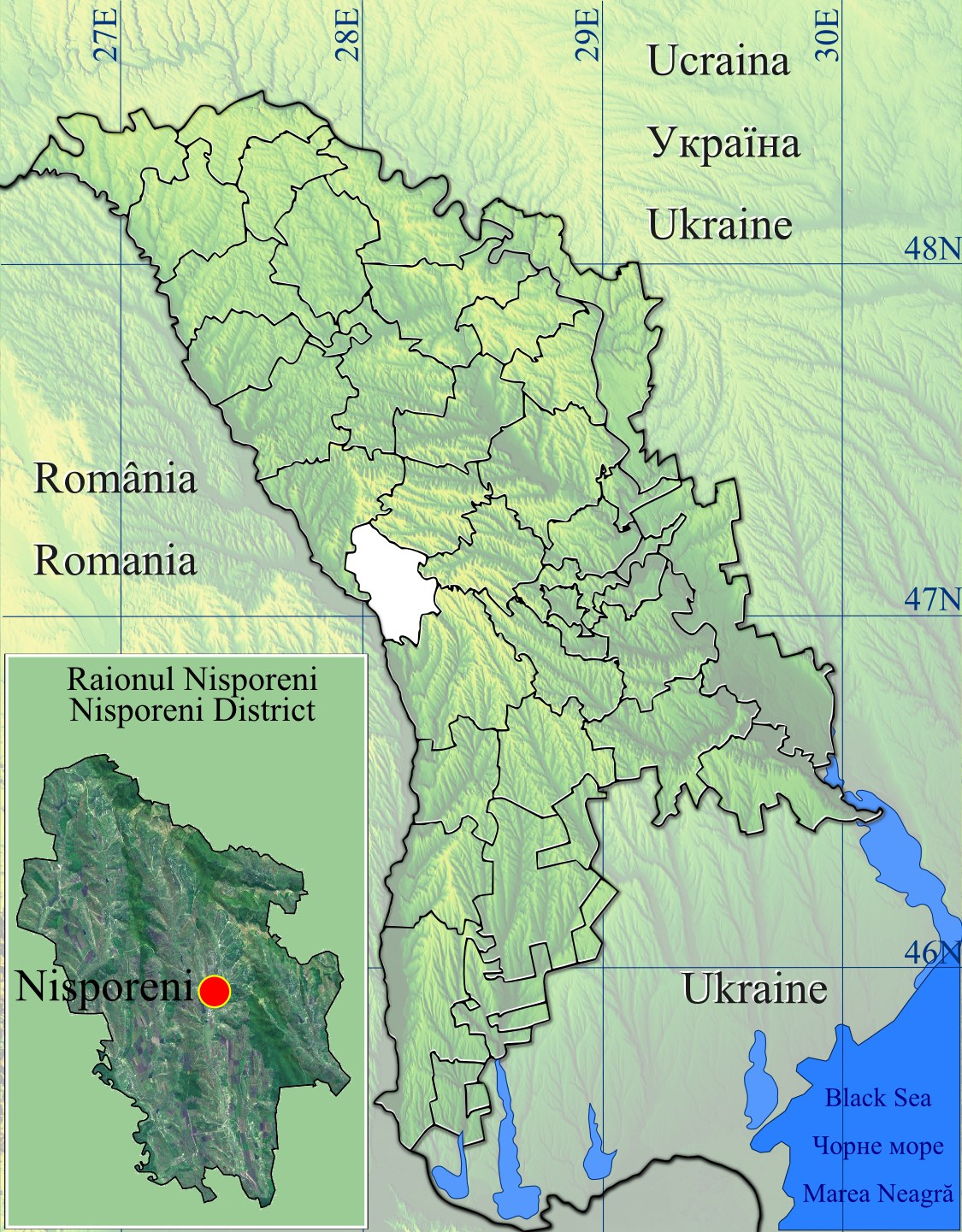
- Location within Nisporeni
- Coordinates: 47°8′3″N 27°58′22″E
- Country: Moldova

Government
  - Mayor: Dubac Ștefan
- Elevation: 69 m (226 ft)

Population (2014)
  - Total: 1,793
- Time zone: UTC+2 (EET)
  - Summer (DST): UTC+3 (EEST)
- Postal code: MD-6417

Brătuleni is a commune in Nisporeni District, Moldova. It is composed of two villages, Brătuleni and Cîrnești.
