= Ghiliceni =

- Commune
- Location in Moldova
- Coordinates: 47°29′N 28°12′E
- Country: Moldova
- District: Telenești District

Population (2014)
  - Total: 2,334
- Time zone: UTC+2 (EET)
  - Summer (DST): UTC+3 (EEST)

Ghiliceni is a commune in Telenești District, Moldova. It is composed of three villages: Cucioaia, Cucioaia Nouă and Ghiliceni.

== Notable people ==
- Dumitru Dron
