= Heciul Nou =

- Commune
- Location within Moldova
- Coordinates: 47.7741°N 28.0605°E
- Country: Moldova

Government
  - Mayor: Valerian Bou
- Elevation: 103 m (338 ft)

Population (2014)
  - Total: 2,531
- Time zone: UTC+2 (EET)
  - Summer (DST): UTC+3 (EEST)
- Postal code: MD-6226

Heciul Nou is a commune in Sîngerei District, Moldova. It is composed of two villages, Heciul Nou and Trifănești.
