= Rogojeni, Șoldănești =

Rogojeni
- Commune
- Location within Moldova
- Coordinates: 47°50′N 28°25′E
- Country: Moldova
- District: Șoldănești District

Population (2014)
  - Total: 712
- Time zone: UTC+2 (EET)
  - Summer (DST): UTC+3 (EEST)

Rogojeni is a commune in Șoldănești District, Moldova. It is composed of two villages, Rogojeni and Rogojeni station.
