= Todirești, Ungheni =

Todirești
- Commune
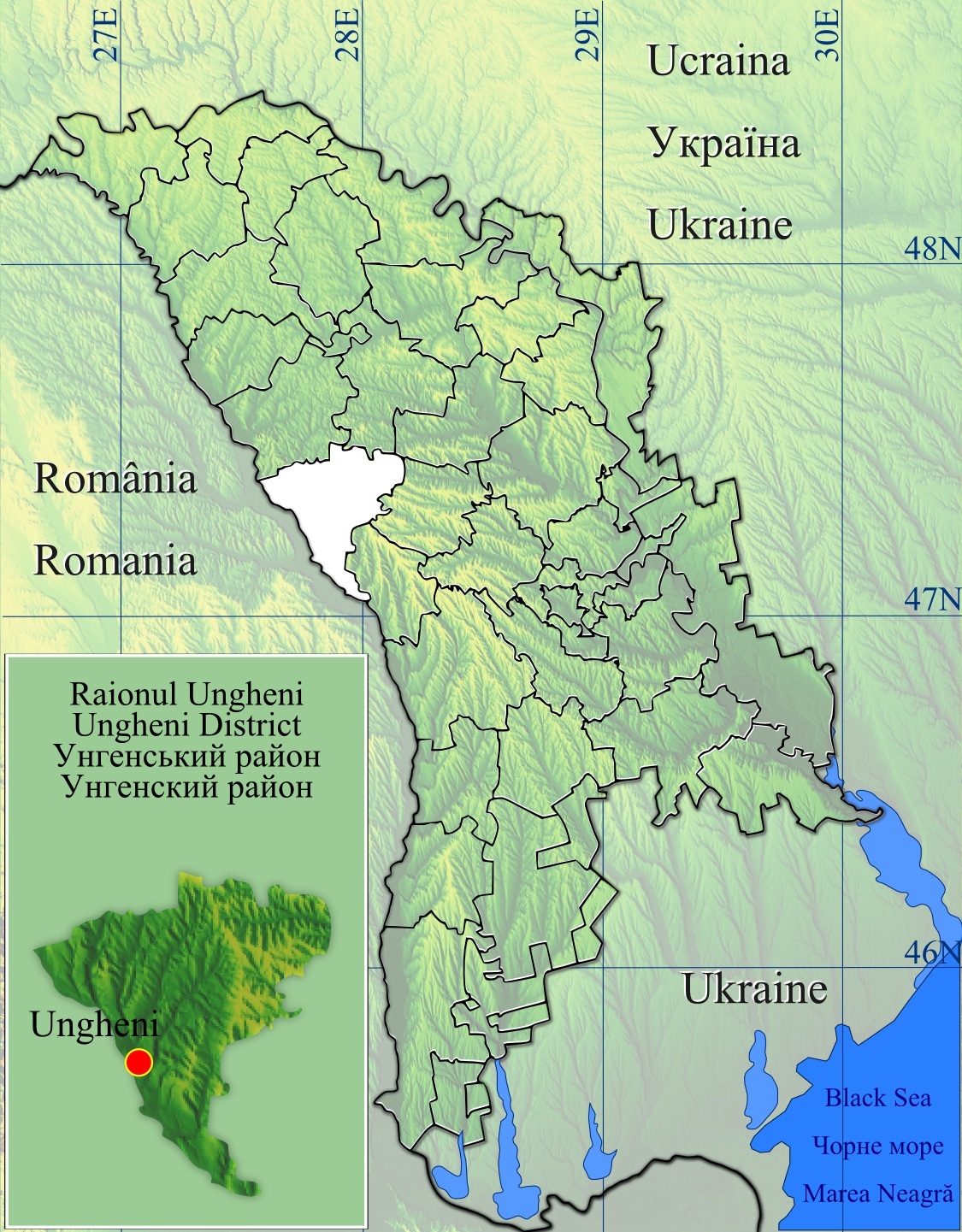
- Location within Ungheni
- Coordinates: 47°18′52″N 27°49′13″E
- Country: Moldova
- District: Ungheni District

Government
  - Mayor: Balatag Victor, 2007

Population (2014)
  - Total: 4,125
- Time zone: UTC+2 (EET)
  - Summer (DST): UTC+3 (EEST)
- Postal code: MD-3649

Todirești is a commune in Ungheni District, Moldova. It is composed of two villages, Grăseni and Todirești.
