= Bucuria =

- Commune
- Location within Moldova
- Coordinates: 45°57′56″N 28°20′53″E
- Country: Moldova
- District: Cahul District

Government
  - Mayor: Denis Hajdău (PN)

Bucuria is a village in Cahul District, Moldova.
