= Vishnevka =

Vishnevka or Vishnyovka (Russian: Вишневка, Вишнёвка) is the name of several rural localities in Russia and Kazakhstan, named after cherry tree (Вишня).

== Kazakhstan ==
- Вишнёвка (Қостанай облысы)
- Вишнёвка (Қызылжар ауданы)
- Вишнёвка (Тайынша ауданы)
- Вишневка (ежелгі тұрақ), paleolithic archeological site
- Вишневка, pre-1998 name of Arshaly
- Вишнёвка, pre-2006 name of kk:Қаракөл (Астрахан ауданы)

== Russia ==
=== Altai Krai ===
As of 2012, one rural locality in Altai Krai bears this name:

- Vishnevka, Altai Krai, a selo in Vishnevsky Selsoviet of Rubtsovsky District; 51°22′N 81°33′E

=== Amur Oblast ===
As of 2012, one rural locality in Amur Oblast bears this name:

- Vishnevka, Amur Oblast, a selo in Annovsky Rural Settlement of Ivanovsky District

=== Republic of Bashkortostan ===
As of 2012, two rural localities in the Republic of Bashkortostan bear this name:

- Vishnevka, Bizhbulyaksky District, Republic of Bashkortostan, a village in Kosh-Yelginsky Selsoviet of Bizhbulyaksky District
- Vishnevka, Chishminsky District, Republic of Bashkortostan, a village in Ibragimovsky Selsoviet of Chishminsky District

=== Bryansk Oblast ===
As of 2012, one rural locality in Bryansk Oblast bears this name:

- Vishnevka, Bryansk Oblast, a village under the administrative jurisdiction of Karachev Urban Administrative Okrug in Karachevsky District; 53°7′N 35°2′E
- Vishnevka, alternative name of Vishnevy, a settlement in Kirillovsky Rural Administrative Okrug of Klimovsky District in Bryansk Oblast; 52°8′N 32°5′E

=== Chelyabinsk Oblast ===
As of 2012, one rural locality in Chelyabinsk Oblast bears this name:

- Vishnevka, Chelyabinsk Oblast, a settlement in Nizhneustselemovsky Selsoviet of Uysky District

=== Republic of Crimea ===
As of 2012, one rural locality in Republic of Crimea bears this name:

- Vishnevka, Republic of Crimea, a selo in Krasnoperekopsky District

=== Kaliningrad Oblast ===
As of 2012, two rural localities in Kaliningrad Oblast bear this name:

- Vishnevka, Guryevsky District, Kaliningrad Oblast, a settlement in Dobrinsky Rural Okrug of Guryevsky District
- Vishnevka, Slavsky District, Kaliningrad Oblast, a settlement in Yasnovsky Rural Okrug of Slavsky District

=== Kemerovo Oblast ===
As of 2012, one rural locality in Kemerovo Oblast bears this name:

- Vishnevka, Kemerovo Oblast, a selo in Vishnevskaya Rural Territory of Belovsky District; 54°24′N 86°24′E

=== Kirov Oblast ===
As of 2012, one rural locality in Kirov Oblast bears this name:

- Vishnevka, Kirov Oblast, a village in Sludsky Rural Okrug of Nemsky District; 57°32′N 50°35′E

=== Kurgan Oblast ===
As of 2012, two rural localities in Kurgan Oblast bear this name:

- Vishnevka, Kargapolsky District, Kurgan Oblast, a village in Zauralsky Selsoviet of Kargapolsky District; 55°52′N 64°2′E
- Vishnevka, Petukhovsky District, Kurgan Oblast, a village in Novoberezovsky Selsoviet of Petukhovsky District; 55°8′N 67°41′E

=== Kursk Oblast ===
As of 2012, two rural localities in Kursk Oblast bear this name:

- Vishnevka, Korenevsky District, Kursk Oblast, a village in Komarovsky Selsoviet of Korenevsky District
- Vishnevka, Shchigrovsky District, Kursk Oblast, a settlement in Vishnevsky Selsoviet of Shchigrovsky District

=== Leningrad Oblast ===
As of 2012, two rural localities in Leningrad Oblast bear this name:

- Vishnevka, Krasnoselskoye Settlement Municipal Formation, Vyborgsky District, Leningrad Oblast, a settlement in Krasnoselskoye Settlement Municipal Formation of Vyborgsky District; 60°31′N 29°34′E
- Vishnevka, Polyanskoye Settlement Municipal Formation, Vyborgsky District, Leningrad Oblast, a settlement in Polyanskoye Settlement Municipal Formation of Vyborgsky District; 60°15′N 29°12′E

=== Novgorod Oblast ===
As of 2012, one rural locality in Novgorod Oblast bears this name:

- Vishnevka, Novgorod Oblast, a village in Ivanteyevskoye Settlement of Valdaysky District

=== Novosibirsk Oblast ===
As of 2012, one rural locality in Novosibirsk Oblast bears this name:

- Vishnevka, Novosibirsk Oblast, a village in Kupinsky District; 53°59′N 76°51′E

=== Omsk Oblast ===
As of 2012, two rural localities in Omsk Oblast bear this name:

- Vishnevka, Nizhneomsky District, Omsk Oblast, a village in Nizhneomsky Rural Okrug of Nizhneomsky District; 55°27′N 74°58′E
- Vishnevka, Sherbakulsky District, Omsk Oblast, a village in Izyumovsky Rural Okrug of Sherbakulsky District; 54°46′N 72°31′E

=== Orenburg Oblast ===
As of 2012, two rural localities in Orenburg Oblast bear this name:

- Vishnevka, Buguruslansky District, Orenburg Oblast, a settlement in Sovetsky Selsoviet of Buguruslansky District
- Vishnevka, Sharlyksky District, Orenburg Oblast, a settlement in Preobrazhensky Selsoviet of Sharlyksky District

=== Primorsky Krai ===
As of 2012, one rural locality in Primorsky Krai bears this name:

- Vishnevka, Primorsky Krai, a selo in Spassky District

=== Rostov Oblast ===
As of 2012, five rural localities in Rostov Oblast bear this name:

- Vishnevka, Fomino-Svechnikovskoye Rural Settlement, Kasharsky District, Rostov Oblast, a khutor in Fomino-Svechnikovskoye Rural Settlement of Kasharsky District; 48°55′N 41°9′E
- Vishnevka, Pervomayskoye Rural Settlement, Kasharsky District, Rostov Oblast, a khutor in Pervomayskoye Rural Settlement of Kasharsky District; 48°54′N 41°19′E
- Vishnevka, Morozovsky District, Rostov Oblast, a khutor in Volno-Donskoye Rural Settlement of Morozovsky District; 48°13′N 41°44′E
- Vishnevka, Rodionovo-Nesvetaysky District, Rostov Oblast, a khutor in Boldyrevskoye Rural Settlement of Rodionovo-Nesvetaysky District; 47°41′N 39°35′E
- Vishnevka, Zernogradsky District, Rostov Oblast, a khutor in Rossoshinskoye Rural Settlement of Zernogradsky District; 46°37′N 40°22′E

=== Ryazan Oblast ===
As of 2012, one rural locality in Ryazan Oblast bears this name:

- Vishnevka, Ryazan Oblast, a village in Novoselkovsky Rural Okrug of Ryazansky District

=== Samara Oblast ===
As of 2012, one rural locality in Samara Oblast bears this name:

- Vishnevka, Samara Oblast, a settlement in Koshkinsky District

=== Smolensk Oblast ===
As of 2012, two rural localities in Smolensk Oblast bear this name:

- Vishnevka, Demidovsky District, Smolensk Oblast, a village in Kartsevskoye Rural Settlement of Demidovsky District
- Vishnevka, Dukhovshchinsky District, Smolensk Oblast, a village under the administrative jurisdiction of Ozyornenskoye Urban Settlement in Dukhovshchinsky District

=== Tambov Oblast ===
As of 2012, three rural localities in Tambov Oblast bear this name:

- Vishnevka, Rzhaksinsky District, Tambov Oblast, a village in Pustovalovsky Selsoviet of Rzhaksinsky District
- Vishnevka, Sosnovsky District, Tambov Oblast, a settlement in Zelenovsky Selsoviet of Sosnovsky District
- Vishnevka, Tambovsky District, Tambov Oblast, a settlement in Bolshelipovitsky Selsoviet of Tambovsky District

=== Volgograd Oblast ===
As of 2012, one rural locality in Volgograd Oblast bears this name:

- Vishnevka, Volgograd Oblast, a settlement in Stepnovsky Selsoviet of Pallasovsky District

=== Voronezh Oblast ===
As of 2012, one rural locality in Voronezh Oblast bears this name:

- Vishnevka, Voronezh Oblast, a settlement in Spasskoye Rural Settlement of Verkhnekhavsky District

== See also ==
- Vishnyowka, Belarus
- Vyshnivka, Ukraine
- Vișniovca, Moldova
