= Grigore Vieru =

Moldovan poet (1935–2009)

Grigore Vieru OR
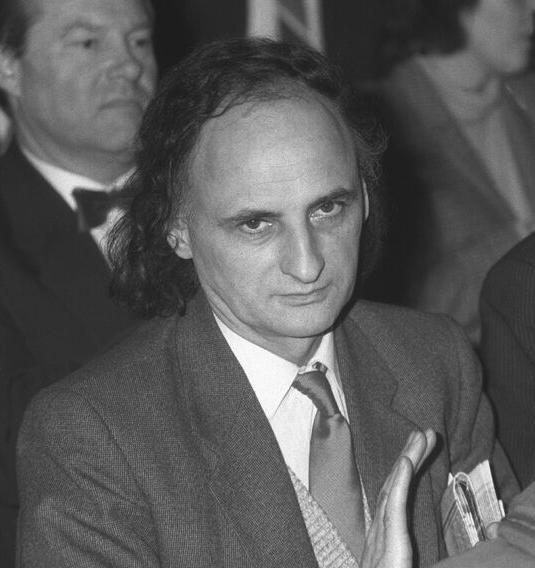
- Vieru in 1990

Personal details
- Born: 14 February 1935 Pererîta, Kingdom of Romania (now Moldova)
- Died: 18 January 2009 (aged 73) Chișinău, Moldova
- Resting place: Chișinău
- Party: Popular Front of Moldova
- Children: Teodor and Călin Vieru
- Profession: Writer

Grigore Vieru (Romanian pronunciation: [ɡriˈɡore viˈeru]; 14 February 1935 – 18 January 2009) was a Moldovan poet, writer and unionist advocate, known for his poems and books for children. His poetry is characterized by vivid natural scenery, patriotism, as well as a venerated image of the sacred mother. Vieru wrote in the Romanian language. In 1993 he was elected a correspondent member of the Romanian Academy.

== Early life ==
He was born in Pererîta village, Hotin County, at the time, part of Romania (today part of Briceni district, Moldova). His parents, Pavel and Eudochia Vieru (née Didic) were farmers.

In 1950, he graduated from the 7-grade school of his native village, after which he attended the middle school in Lipcani, which he graduated in 1953.

== Personal life ==
Vieru had been married to Raisa Vieru since 1959; they had two sons, Teodor and Călin Vieru.

== Creative work ==
His first publishing debut was in 1957, a booklet of poems for children, «Alarma» («Alarm»), appreciated by literary critics.The following year, Vieru graduated from the Ion Creangă Pedagogical State University in Chișinău with a degree in history and philology. He was employed as an editor in the magazine called «Scînteia Leninistă» («The Leninist Spark») designed for children, currently it is called «Noi» («We»), and the newspaper «Tînărul leninist» («The Young Leninist»), currently «Florile Dalbe» («Glowing Flowers»).

In 1959, he became editor at the «Nistru» («Dniester») magazine, currently «Basarabia», a publication of the Writers' Union of Moldova.

From 1960 to 1963, he served as editor in chief of the «Cartea Moldovenească» («Moldavian book») publishing house.

In 1967, Vieru's book «Poetry for Readers of All Ages» (published in 1965) was awarded the Moldavian Prize for Youth Literature. The following year, his book «Your Name» became part of the contemporary literature curriculum in Moldavian universities

He wrote another children's story/picture book «Bread and Dew» which features Doru, a 4 or 5-year-old boy who lives in Chișinău with his parents.

Many moldavian composers were inspired by the poetry of Grigore Vieru (songbook «Poftim de intrați», «Cine crede» etc.), the poet himself is the author of a lot of melodies («Să crești mare» etc.) and since 1964 he began to collaborate with composer Yulia Tsibulskaya («Soare, soare», «Clopoțeii», «Stea-stea, logostea», «Ramule-neamule», «Cîntînd cu iubire» etc.).

He was a frequent guest of the «Poetry House»in Cociulia village, Cantemir District. The famous book for preschoolers «Albinuța» was also written here.

1968 was turning point for the poet's destiny; this year became remarkable by the volume of lyrical «Numele Tău» («Your name»), with an introductory written by Ion Druță. The book was appreciated by literary critics as the most original poetic appearance. In the year of it publishing, it became a subject of the study at the university within the courses designated for the contemporary national literature. Three poems in the volume are entitled: Tudor Arghezi, Lucian Blaga, Brâncuși, and another two are dedicated to Nicolae Labiș and Marin Sorescu. For the first time, in the post war period, such dedications has appeared in the Bessarabian lyrics.

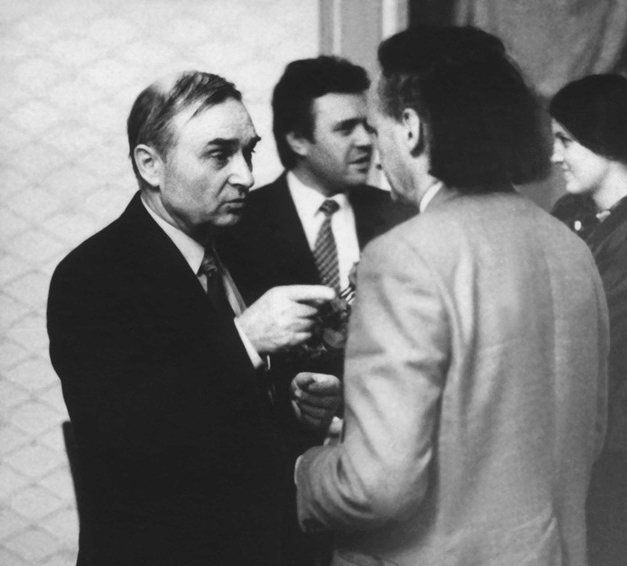
Ion Druță talking to Grigore Vieru at the Moldovan embassy in Bucharest, in the 1990s

== Political activity ==
In his youth, Grigore Vieru was a member of Komsomol Organisation. In 1971, he joined the Communist Party.

In 1973, Grigore Vieru passed the Prut within a delegation of Soviet writers. He participated in the meeting with the editors of the «20th Century» magazine: Dan Haulică, Ștefan Augustin Doinaș, Ioanichie Olteanu, Geo Șerban, Tatiana Nicolescu. At his request, he has visited monasteries of Putna, Voroneț, Sucevița, Dragomirna, Văratec. He returned to Chișinău with a bag of books. Later the poet makes the following confession:

If somebody dreamed of getting to outer space, for my whole life I have dreamed of crossing the Prut River

In 1974 and 1977, invited by the president of the Romanian Writers' Union, Vieru visited Bucharest, Constanța, Iași, and cities in Transylvania.

In 1978, the «Junimea» publishing house printed «The Friday Star», Vieru's first work published in Romania.

In 1989 he was elected member of Moldova's Parliament and campaigned for the unification of Moldova and Romania. The following year he was elected Honorary Member of the Romanian Academy. In 1992, the Romanian Academy recommended Vieru for the Nobel Peace Prize.

In 1995, he became a member of the Board of the Romanian Radio Broadcasting Company, and in 1996 he won several Romanian literary awards.

In 2000, Vieru was awarded the «Eminescu» Medal by the Romanian government.

=== Involvement in the Bessarabia National Liberation Movement ===
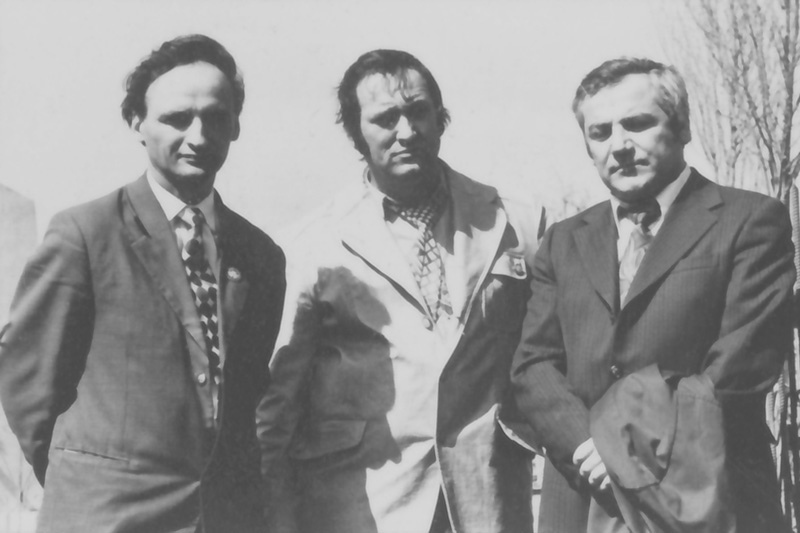
Grigore Vieru, Ion Vatamanu and Serafim Saka in '70.

At the end of the 80s, Grigore Vieru is in the first line of the National Liberation Movement in Bessarabia, his texts (including the songs laid on his lyrics) playing a big role in awakening of the national consciousness of Romanians in Bessarabia. Vieru is one of the founders of the People's Front of Moldova and is among the organizers and leaders of the Great National Assembly of 27 August 1989. He actively participates in the debates of the 13th session of the Supreme Soviet of the SSR, in which the Romanian language is voted as the official language and the transition to Latin spelling.

== Death ==
On 16 January 2009, Vieru suffered a serious traffic accident and was admitted to the Emergency Hospital in Chișinău. Grigore Vieru was in critical condition with polytrauma, closed cranio-cerebral trauma, cerebral contusion, and closed chest trauma, contusion of the heart and lungs and contusion of the abdominal organs, with minimal chances of survival. The road accident took place on the night of 15 to 16 January, at 1:30 am on the R-3 route Chișinău – Hâncești – Cimișlia – Basarabeasca. At the driver's seat was Gheorghe Munteanu, emeritus artist of the Republic of Moldova and deputy director of the "Joc" folk dance troop of Chișinău, who being in an easier state. At the time, he was out with friends celebrating the birthday of Mihai Eminescu, a 19th-century Romanian poet. Vieru died on 18 January 2009, in the Emergency Hospital in Chișinău two days after the accident, following a cardiac failure from which he could not be resuscitated.

Grigore Vieru was buried on 20 January 2009, in Chișinău, at the Central Cemetery on Armeana street. The funeral was attended by tens of thousands of people, the divisions of Grigore Vieru, as professor Dan Dungaciu called them in his article. Chișinău had not known such funerals since the burial of the spouses Doina and Ion Aldea Teodorovici. The day of 20 January 2009, was declared a day of mourning in the Republic of Moldova, at 10:00 the whole republic having a moment of silence. Vieru's funeral was also broadcast live by Teleradio Moldova.

== Legacy ==
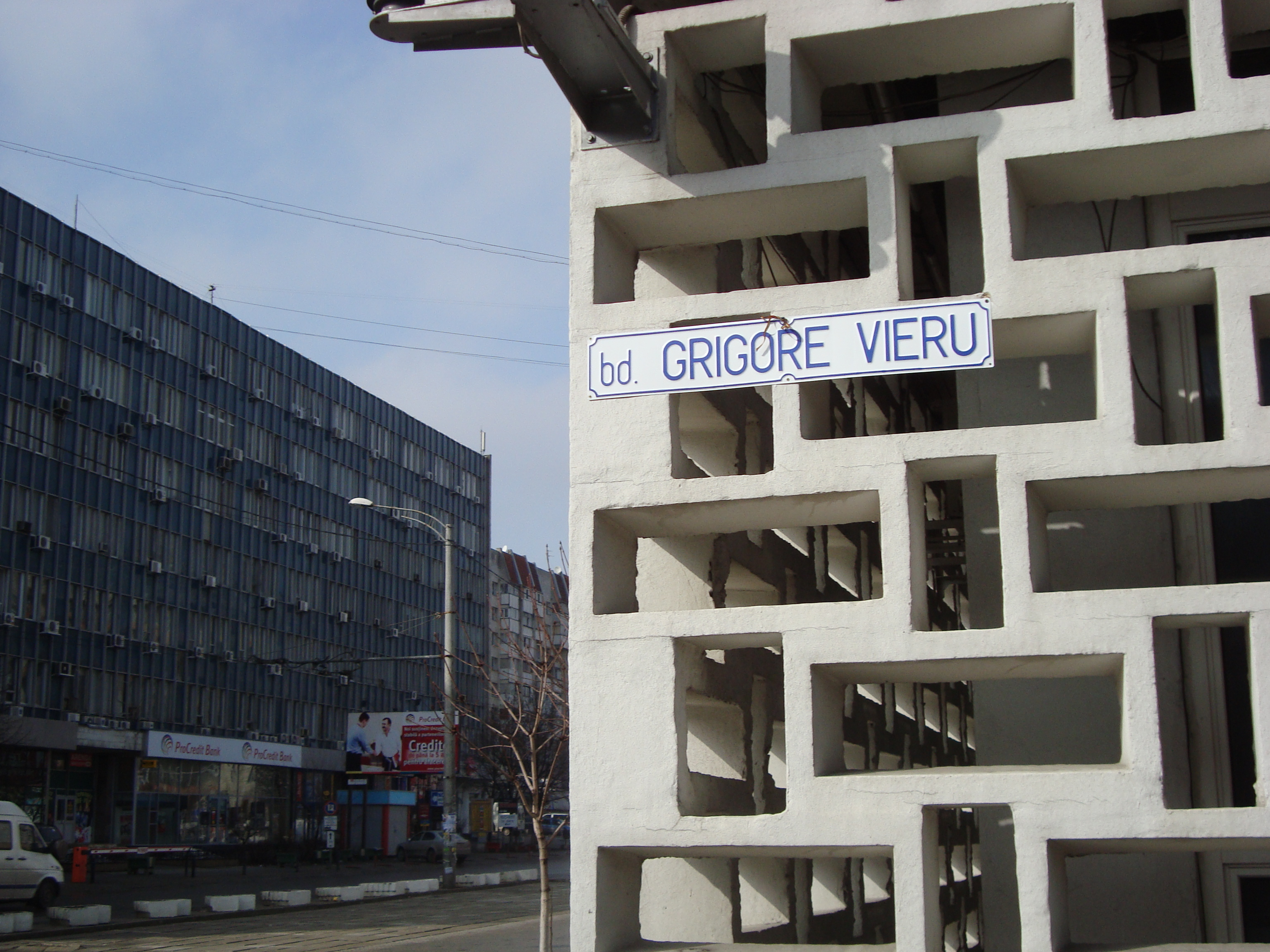
The plaque on Grigore Vieru Boulevard in Chișinău

Several schools in the Republic of Moldova, a boulevard in Chișinău and a street in Iași are called in honour of Grigore Vieru. On 11 February 2010, three days before his birthday, the poet's bust was installed in the Alley of Classics. A street in Buzău is called in honour of Grigore Vieru: Grigore Vieru Street.

== Awards ==
In 1996 he won several Romanian literary awards, and in the same year on 23 August, he won Order of the Republic (Moldova).

The Romanian president Traian Băsescu has posthumously awarded Grigore Vieru with the Order of the Star of Romania, Grand Cross.

== Moments in Vieru's life ==
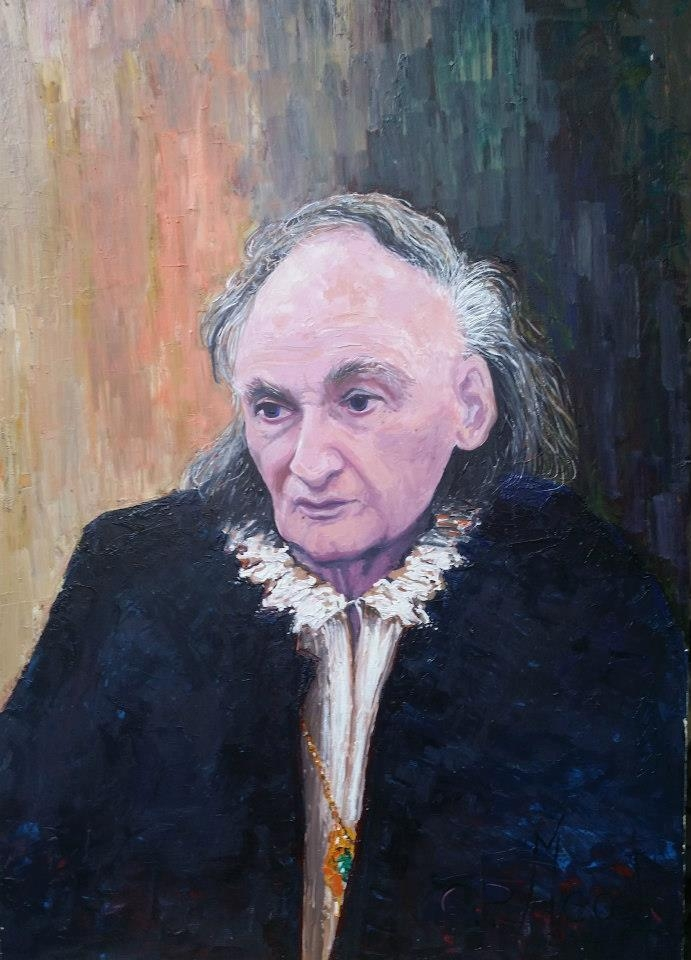
Grigore Vieru, picture by Paul Mecet

In the volume of lyrics designed for children "Trei iezi" (Three baby goats) published in 1970, there was also the poem called "Curcubeul" (The Rainbow), in which Vieru, used the metaphor of the rainbow with three colours, praised the flag of all Romanians. In short period of time after the book publishing, the Soviet censorship withdrew the book from the bookstores, and the author was accused of diversion. Also in 1970, has appeared The Abecedarul book developed by Vieru in collaboration with the writer Spiridon Vangheli. Even nowadays, this textbook, which was edited many times over time, still teaches the first class little Bessarabians. In 1989, Vieru and Vangheli also made the Latin alphabet version of The Abecedarul.

Vieru wrote, among many others, the lyrics for the soundtrack of the cartoon film Maria, Mirabela, and the Vieru's poem "Dragă Otee" (Dear Otee) has been sung by Iurie Sadovnic. Later, the song was taken over by Zdob și Zdub.

In 1988, in the newspaper Literatura şi Arta (Literature and Art) in Chișinău, the first Latin-written text from post-war Bessarabia has appeared. The author was Grigore Vieru.

In June 1989, Vieru has got the approval of the Soviet authorities to publish the weekly Literatura si Arta in Latin writing, the editors of the newspaper mentioned that in all Soviet Moldova there were no typewriter of Latin letters, except the one from the Academy of Sciences of the MSSR and of professor Iulius Popa from Bălți. Under these conditions, Grigore Vieru and the editor-in-chief of Literatura și Arta, Nicolae Dabija, went to Bucharest to get the typewriter for the newspaper. The Romanian authorities were delaying the answer, and the antiquarian shop from which they could buy such a device was closed these days because of some technical issues. However, Vieru and Dabija were helped by the priest Vasile Țepordei, who brought to the station a bag containing the 31 metallic signs of the Latin alphabet, cut by him from his own typewriter. In Chișinău, the Latin signs are welded to a typewriter instead of the Cyrillic ones, so Literatura și Arta magazine became the first newspaper of Bessarabia to start systematically coming out in Latin spelling.

In 1994, the neo-communists of the Democratic Agrarian Party, who came to power in Moldova, gave up to the state hymn Deșteaptă-te, române! (Awaken thee, Romanian!) and proposed to the poet Grigore Vieru and the composer Eugen Doga to compose the lyrics and music for a new hymn. They both refused. Grigore Vieru wrote in the Literatura și Arta magazine the following:

"Historical justice will blame the poets and composers who will dare to raise their hands on the National Hymn "Deșteaptă-te, române!" stooping instead of his historical need and brilliance."

== Works ==
- 1957 – "Alarma" (Alarm) (lyrics for children);
- 1958 – "Muzicuțe" (Musical notes) (lyrics for children);
- 1961 – "Făt-Frumos curcubeul și Bună ziua, fulgilor!" (Făt-Frumos the rainbow and Good morning, the flakes!) by the "Cartea Moldovenească" publishing house;
- 1963 – "Mulțumim pentru pace" (Thanks for peace) (lyrics) and "Făgurași" (lyrics, stories and songs);
- 1964 – The magazine "Nistru" published the poem "Legământ" (The Covenan), dedicated to poet Mihai Eminescu;
- 1965 – "Versuri pentru cititorii de toate vârstele" (The lyrics for readers of all ages), with an introductory word written by Ion Druță and for this lyrics the poet was awarded The Comsomol Republican Prize in the field of children's and youth literature (1967);
- 1967 – "Poezii de seama voastră" (Poems of your age) ("Lumina" publishing house);
- 1968 – "Bărbații Moldovei" (Moldova's Men), designed to the "nationalist" Nicolae Testimițeanu ("Nistru" magazine). The whole circulation was stopped, and the dedication taken away;
- 1969 – "Duminica cuvintelor" (The Words of Sunday) by "Lumina" publishing house with illustrations by Igor Vieru, a book much loved by pre-schoolers, which is present in every kindergarten;
- 1970 – "Abecedarul" ("Lumina" publishing house) – in collaboration with Spiridon Vangheli and painter Igor Vieru;
- 1972 – "Trei iezi" (Three baby goats);
- 1974 – "Aproape" (Nearby) (lyrics, with color illustrations by Isai Cârmu);
- 1975 – "Mama" (The Mother) ("Lumina" publishing house – book for the little ones, illustrated by Igor Vieru);
- 1976 – "Un verde ne vede!"(A green one sees us!) ("Lumina" publishing house – for this volume of lyrics the poem is awarded the State Prize of the Republic of Moldova (1978);
- 1989 – "Metafore Albastre" – Сини метафори (The Blue metaphors) – ("Narodna cultura" publishing house, Sofia – in the collection Globus poetic, translation into Bulgarian by Ognean Stamboliev;
- 2010 – "Mi-e dor de piatră" – Жал ми е за камъка (I miss the stone) – publishing house Avangardprint, Bulgaria – translation into Bulgarian and preface by Ognean Stamboliev – 100 poems.

It is present in:

- Streiflicht – Eine Auswahl zeitgenössischer rumänischer Lyrik (81 rumänische Autoren), – "Lumina piezișă" (Pie light) the bilingual anthology consisted of 81 Romanian writers, translated by Christian W. Schenk, Dionysos Verlag 1994, ISBN 3980387119
- Blauen Metaphern – translation into German and preface by Christian W. Schenk, 1995, Dionysos.

== Music on lyrics by Vieru ==
- Maria Mirabela
- Dragă Otee
- Pentru Ea
- Răsai
- Eminescu
- La mănăstirea Căpriana (Clopotul Învierii)
- Lăsați-ne în legea noastră
- Două lacrimi gemene (Chișinău și București)
- O serenadă
- Melancolie
- Ultima oră
- Reaprindeți candela
- Mi-e dor de tine, mamă
- Codrul e frumos cu floare

== Gallery ==
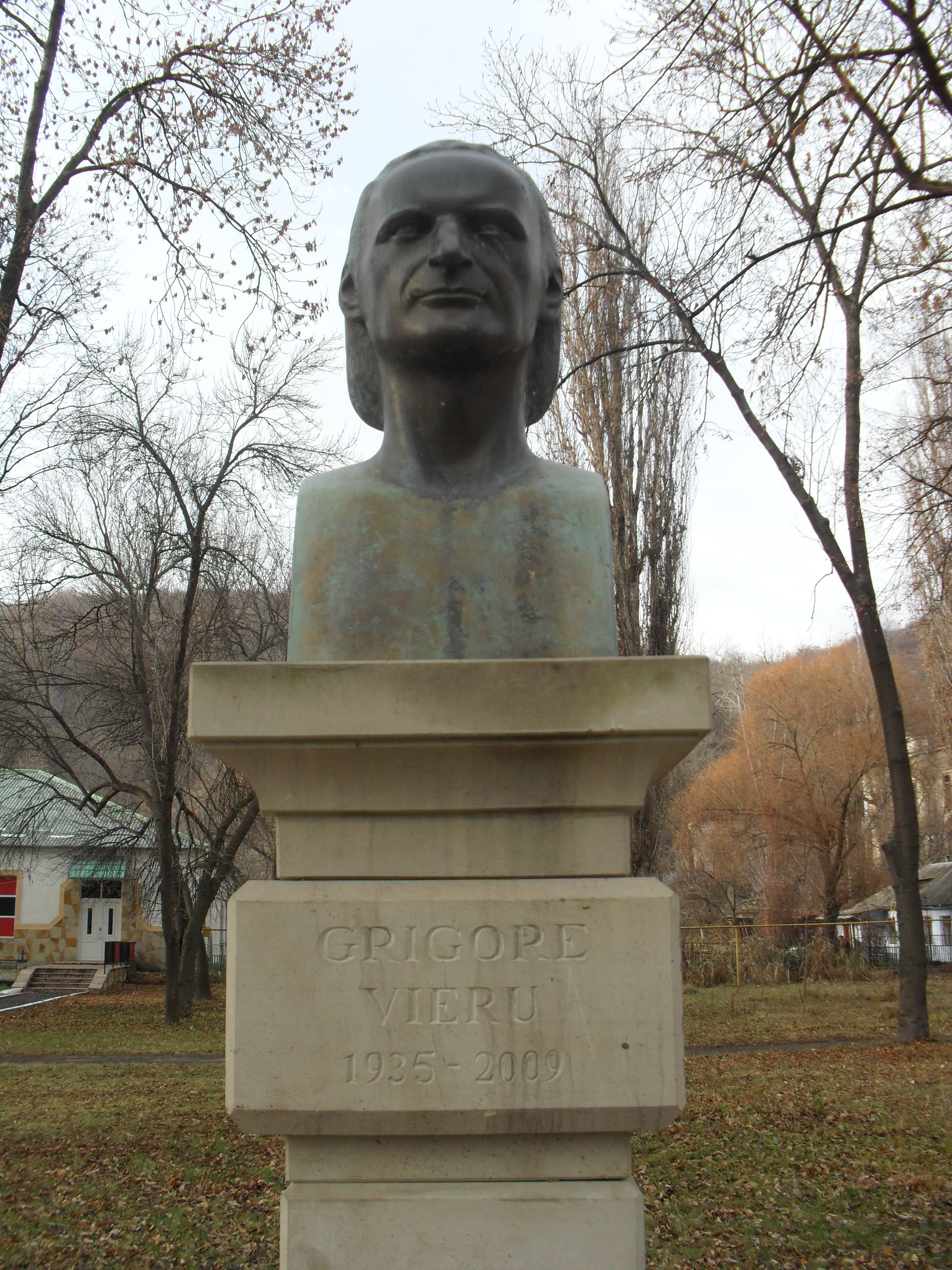
Grigore Vieru in Soroca

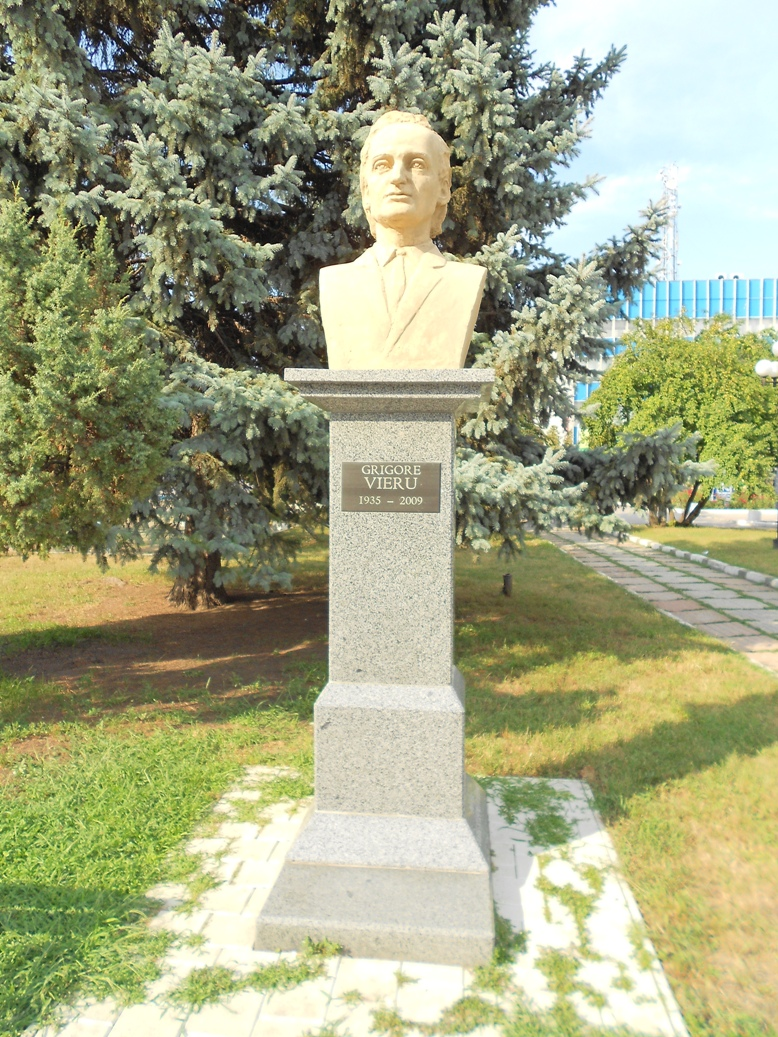
Alley of Classics, Bălți

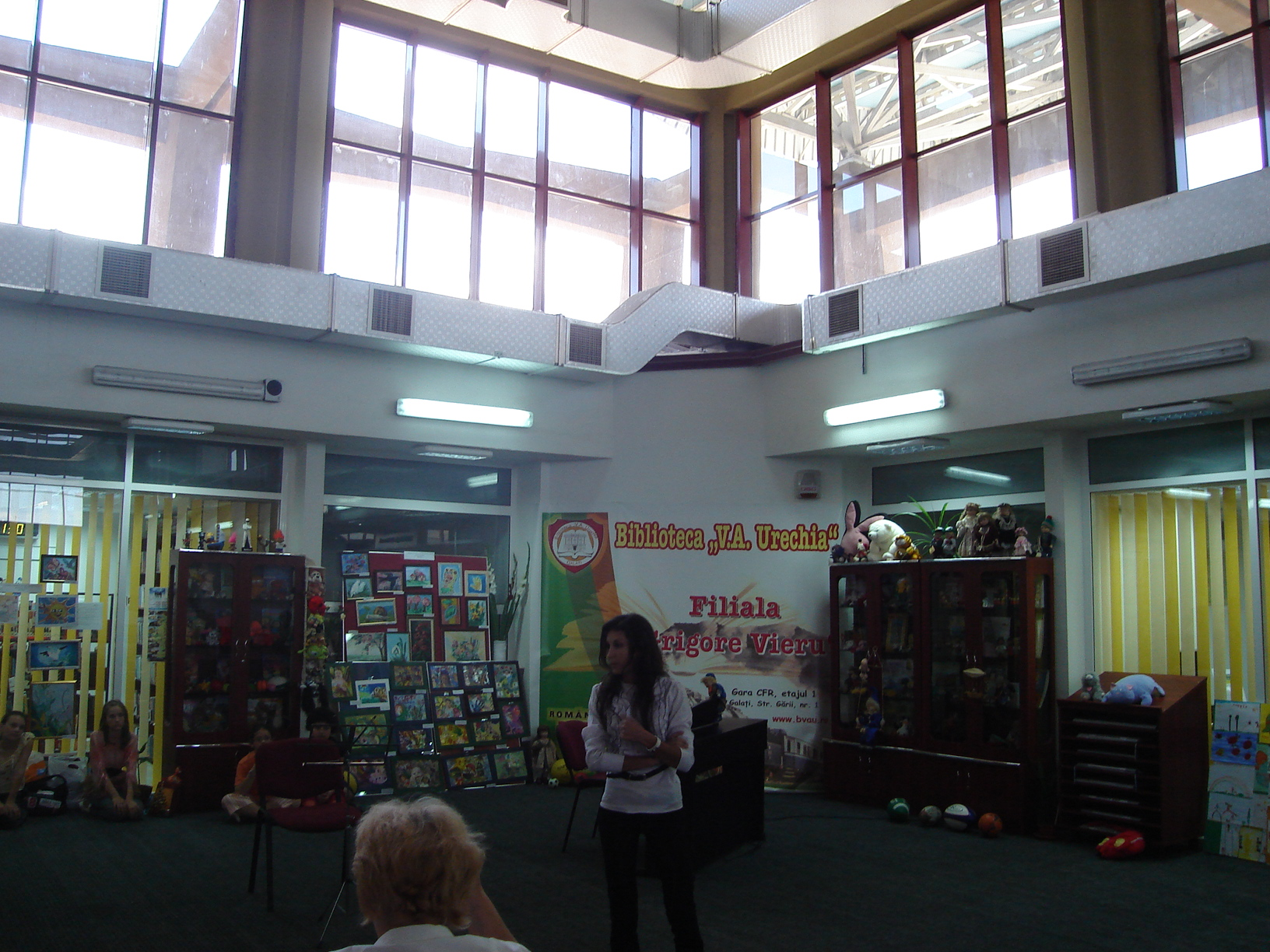
Eurostation of Galați Grigore Vieru library

== See also ==
- Unification of Moldova and Romania
