= Vishnyowka =

Vishnyowka (Belarusian: Вішнёўка, romanized: Višnioŭka; Russian: Вишнёвка, romanized: Vishnyovka; also spelled Vishnevka) may refer to the following places in Belarus, named after cherry tree (Вiшня):

== Minsk Oblast ==
- Vishnyowka, Papyernya Selsoviet, agrotown in Minsk Oblast
- be:Вішнёўка (Бараўскі сельсавет), Minsk Oblast
- be:Вішнёўка (Станькаўскі сельсавет), Minsk Oblast
- be:Вішнёўка (Гаранскі сельсавет), Minsk Oblast
- be:Вішнёўка (Крупіцкі сельсавет), Minsk Oblast
- be:Вішнёўка (Пухавіцкі раён), Minsk Oblast
- be:Вішнёўка (Салігорскі раён), Minsk Oblast
- be:Вішнёўка (Слуцкі раён), Minsk Oblast
- be:Вішнёўка (Уздзенскі раён), Minsk Oblast

== Other ==
- be:Вішнёўка (Івацэвіцкі раён), Brest Oblast
- be:Вішнёўка (Гомельскі раён), Gomel Oblast
- be:Вішнёўка (Рэчыцкі раён), Gomel Oblast
- be:Вішнёўка (вёска, Смаргонскі раён), Grodno Oblast
- be:Вішнёўка (Бабруйскі раён), Mogilev Oblast
- be:Вішнёўка (Клічаўскі раён), Mogilev Oblast
- be:Вішнёўка (Гарадоцкі раён), Vitebsk Oblast

== See also ==
- Vishnevka, Russia
- Vyshnivka, Ukraine
- Vișniovca, Moldova
