= Vyshnivka =

Vyshnivka (Ukrainian: Вишнівка) is a Ukrainian word deriving from the name of cherry tree (Вишня). It is used to denote a cherry liquor (horilka). It may also refer to the following geographical locations in Ukraine,

- Vyshnivka, Crimea
- Vyshnivka, Vinnytsia Raion
- uk:Вишнівка (Ковельський район)
- Вишнівка (Звягельський район)
- Вишнівка (Василівський район)
- uk:Вишнівка (Коломийський район)
- Вишнівка (Кропивницький район)
- Вишнівка (Куп'янський район)
- Вишнівка (Прилуцький район)

== See also ==
- Vishnyowka, Belarus
- Vishnevka, Russia
- Vișniovca, Moldova
