= Stoianovca =

Stoianovca Стояновка
- Village
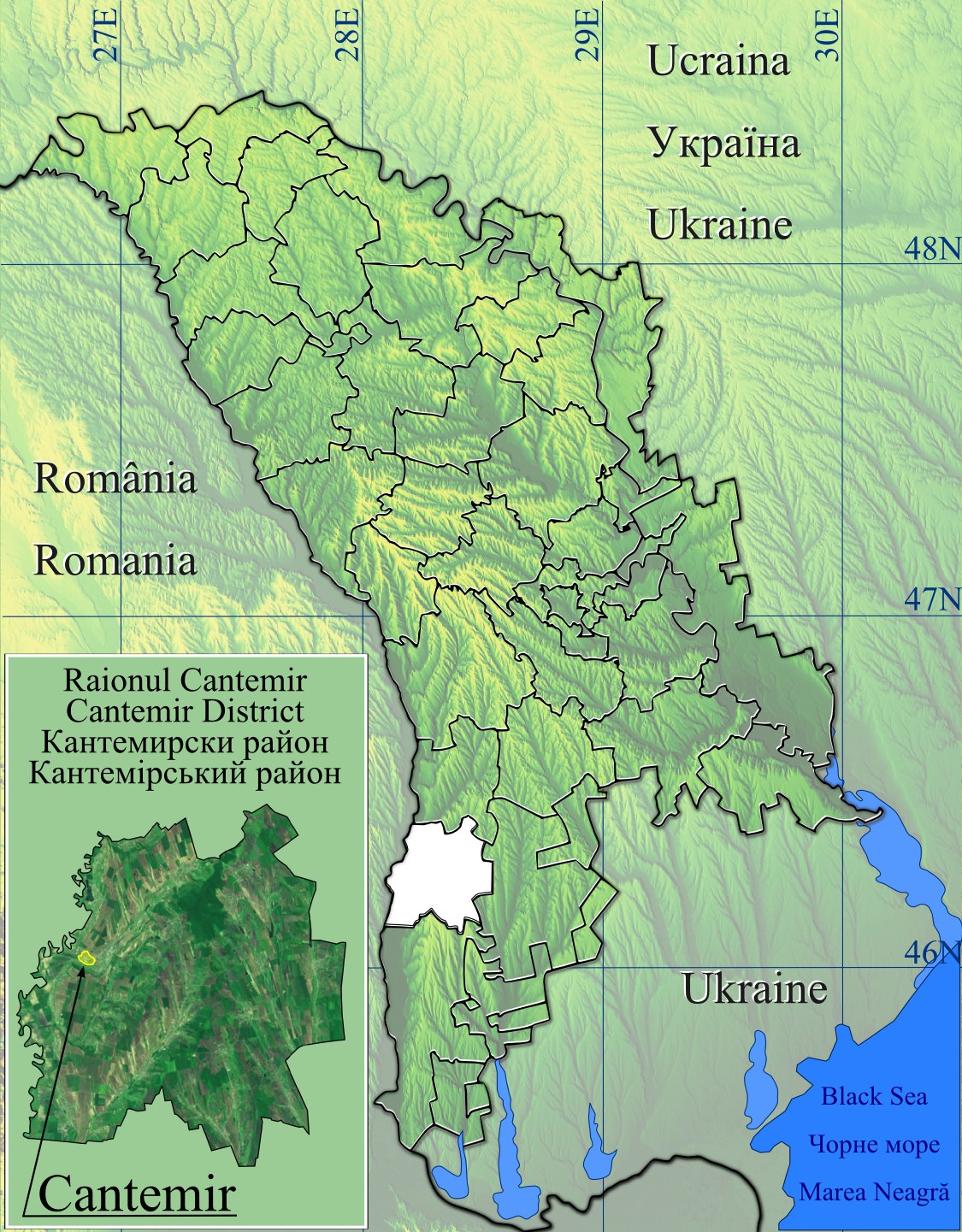
- Location in Moldova
- Coordinates: 46°16′N 28°10′E
- Country: Moldova
- District: Cantemir District

Population (2014 census)
  - Total: 1,191
- Time zone: UTC+2 (EET)
  - Summer (DST): UTC+3 (EEST)

Stoianovca (Russian, Bulgarian: Стояновка) is a village in Cantemir District, Moldova. The majority of the population is composed of Bessarabian Bulgarians.

It is a border crossing between Moldova and Romania.

== History ==
The village was founded in 1902 by Bessarabian Bulgarians who moved from the villages of Corten, Ceadîr-Lunga and Valea Perjei.

Initially, the village was part of the Leova District. Later (from 1951 to 1970) it belonged to the Cahul District of the Moldavian SSR. Then it became a part of Cantemir District.
