= Alley of Classics, Bălți =

The Alley of Classics
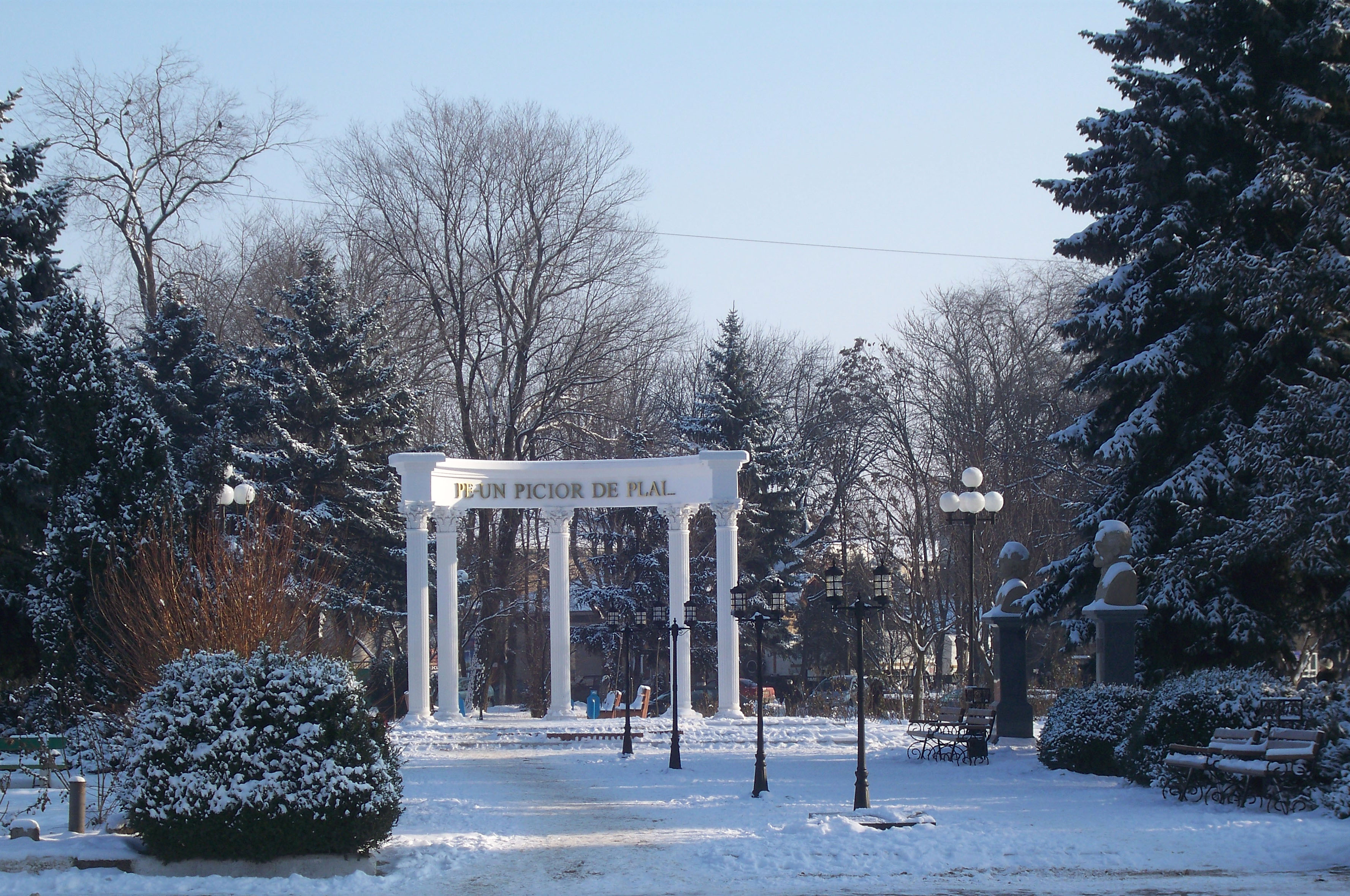
- Interactive map of The Alley of Classics
- Location: Bălți
- Coordinates: 47°46′N 27°55′E
- Designer: Gheorghe Gheorghiu
- Type: Sculptural complex
- Height: 2.5 metres (8.2 ft)
- Beginning date: 2010
- Opening date: 17 July 2010
- Dedicated to: Romanian cultural elite

The Alley of Classics (Romanian: Aleea Clasicilor) is a sculptural complex located in Bălți, Moldova.

== Busts ==
The Alley of Classics contains 3 busts:

No	Bust	Unveiled	Sculptor	Image
1	Ion Creangă	2010	Gheorghe Gheorghiu	
2	Mihai Eminescu	2010	Gheorghe Gheorghiu	
3	Grigore Vieru	2010	Gheorghe Gheorghiu	

== See also ==
- Alley of Classics, Chişinău
