= Lărguța =

- Village
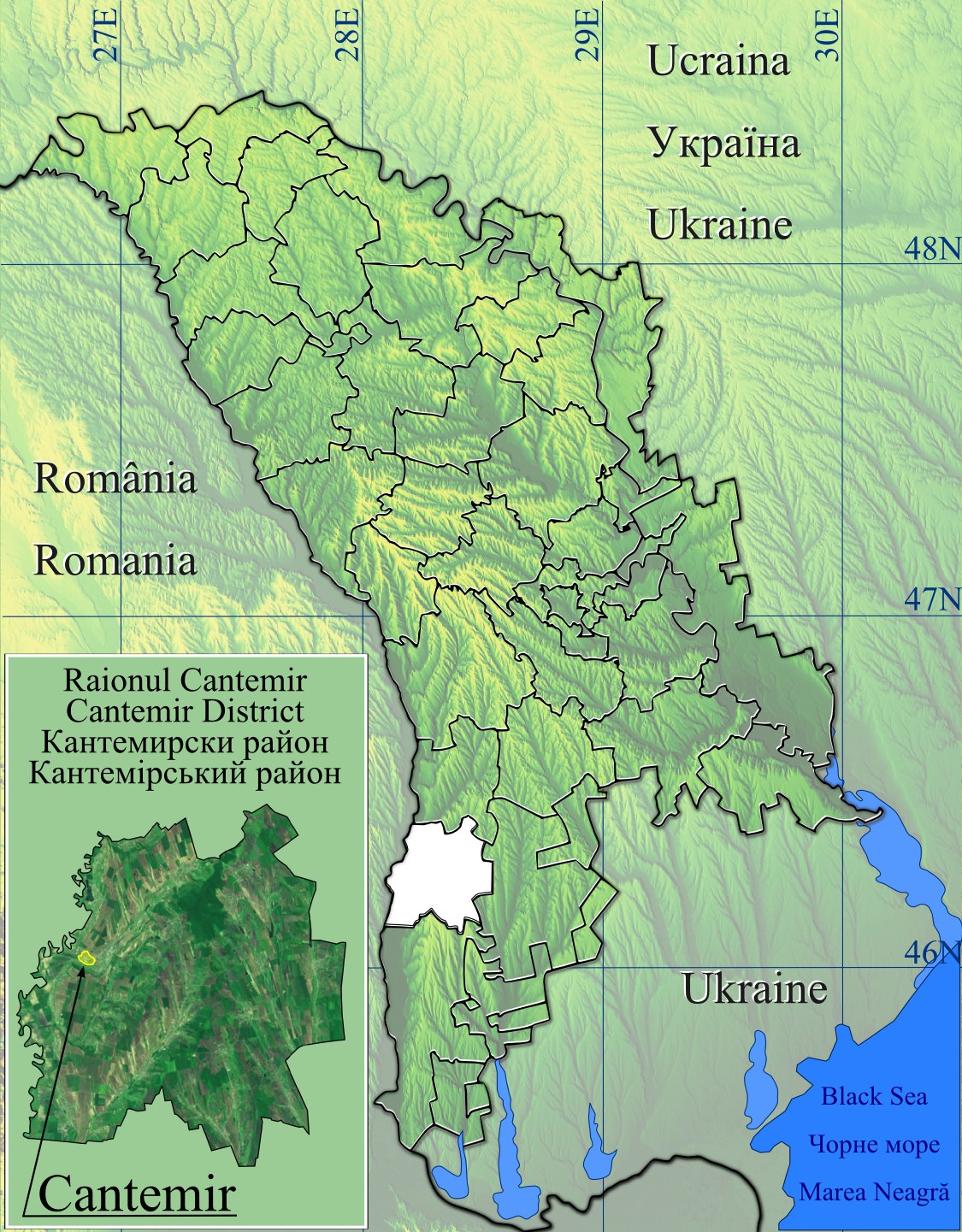
- Location within Cantemir
- Coordinates: 46°18′9″N 28°19′10″E
- Country: Moldova
- District: Cantemir District

Government
  - Mayor: Viorel Dogaru

Area
  - Total: 33.6 km^{2} (13.0 sq mi)
- Elevation: 161 m (528 ft)

Population (2014 census)
  - Total: 2,592
- Time zone: UTC+2 (EET)
  - Summer (DST): UTC+3 (EEST)
- Postal code: MD-7328

Lărguța is a village in Cantemir District, Moldova.
