= Capaclia =

Capaclia Capaclia-Răzeși
- Village
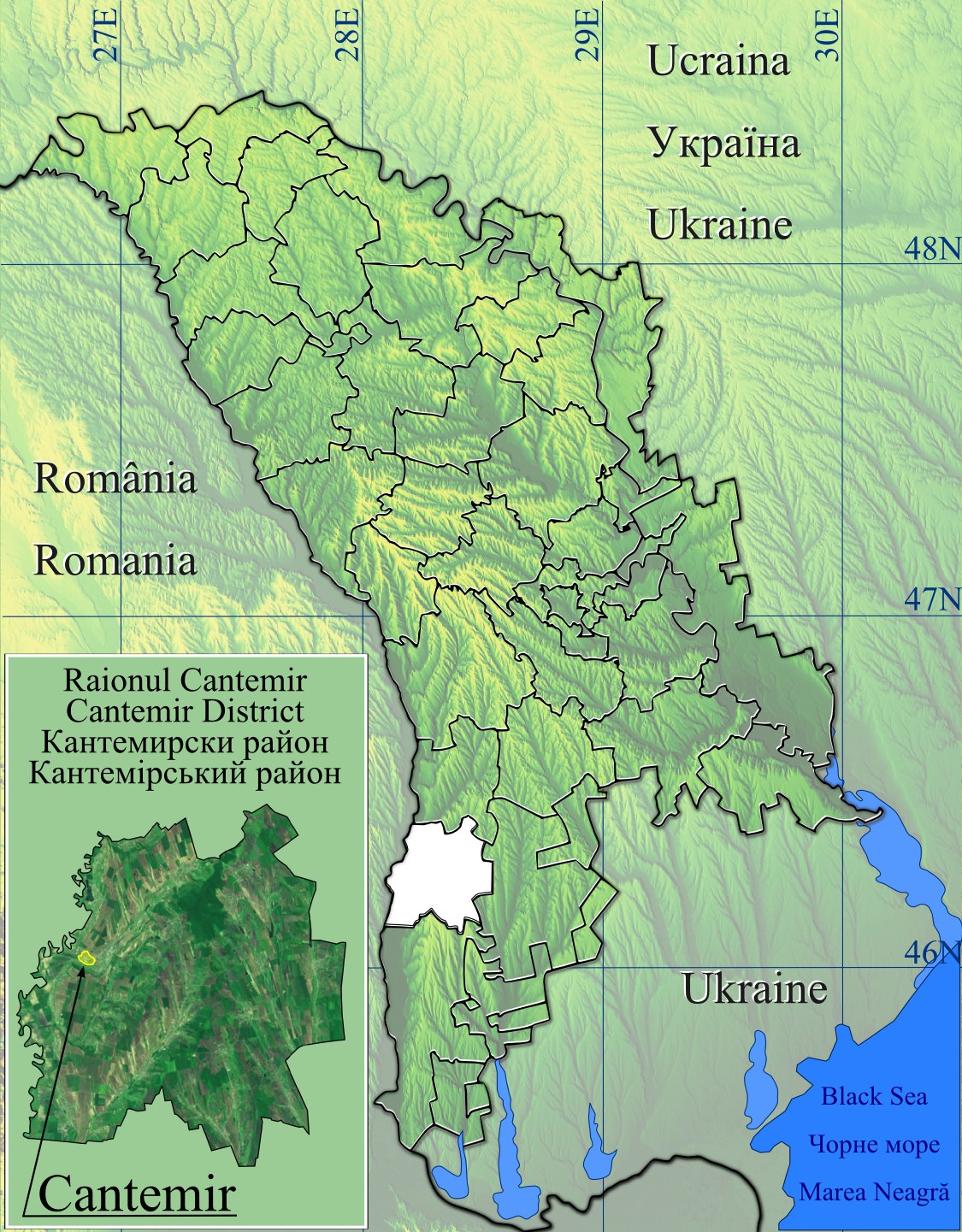
- Location within Cantemir
- Coordinates: 46°19′43″N 28°24′00″E
- Country: Moldova

Government
  - Mayor: Alexei Busuioc (Independent)
- Elevation: 157 m (515 ft)

Population (2014 census)
  - Total: 1,576
- Time zone: UTC+2 (EET)
  - Summer (DST): UTC+3 (EEST)
- Postal code: MD-7315
- Website: www.capaclia.md

Capaclia is a village in Cantemir District, Moldova.
