= Cîrpești =

- Village
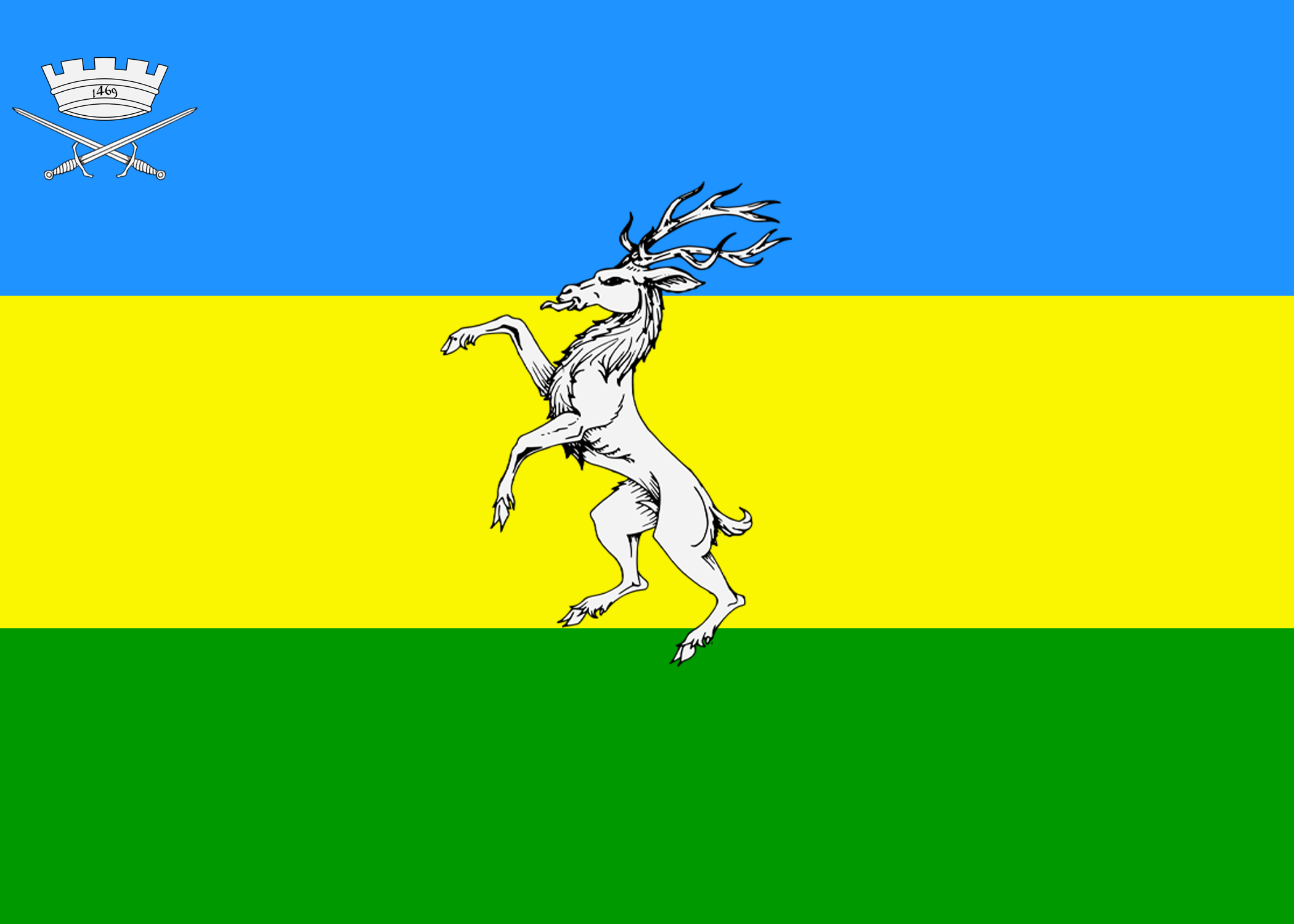
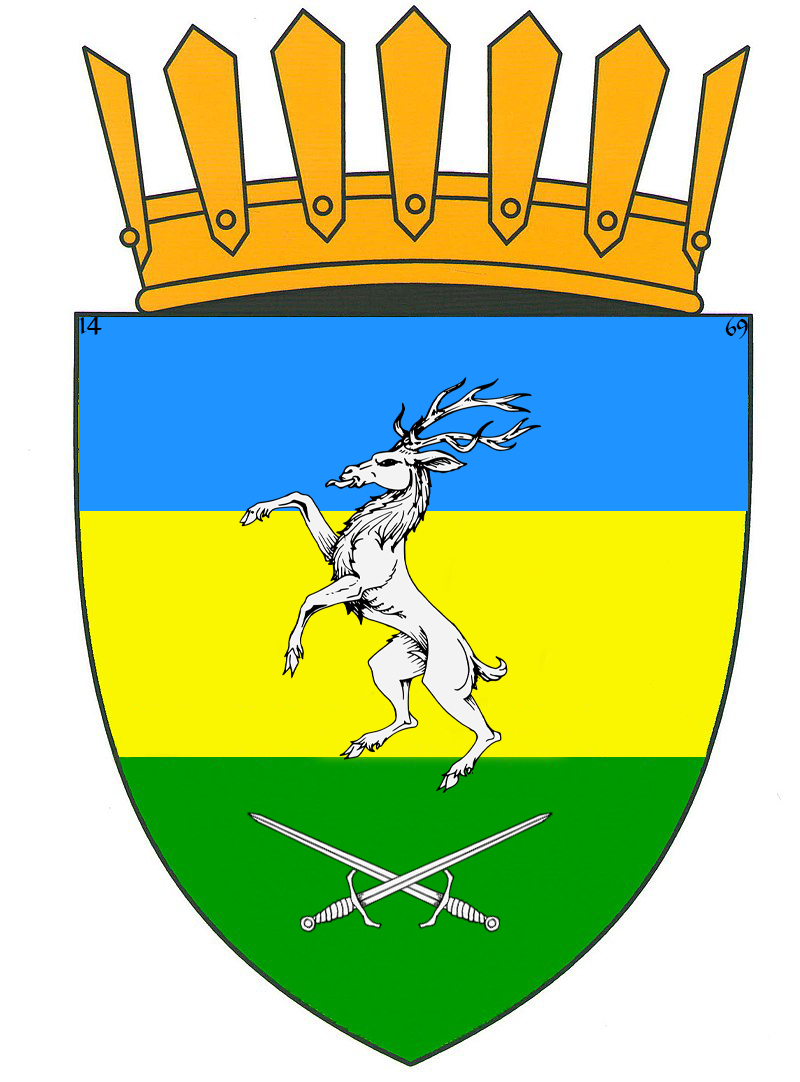
- Flag Coat of arms
- Motto: Radicata in Infinitum
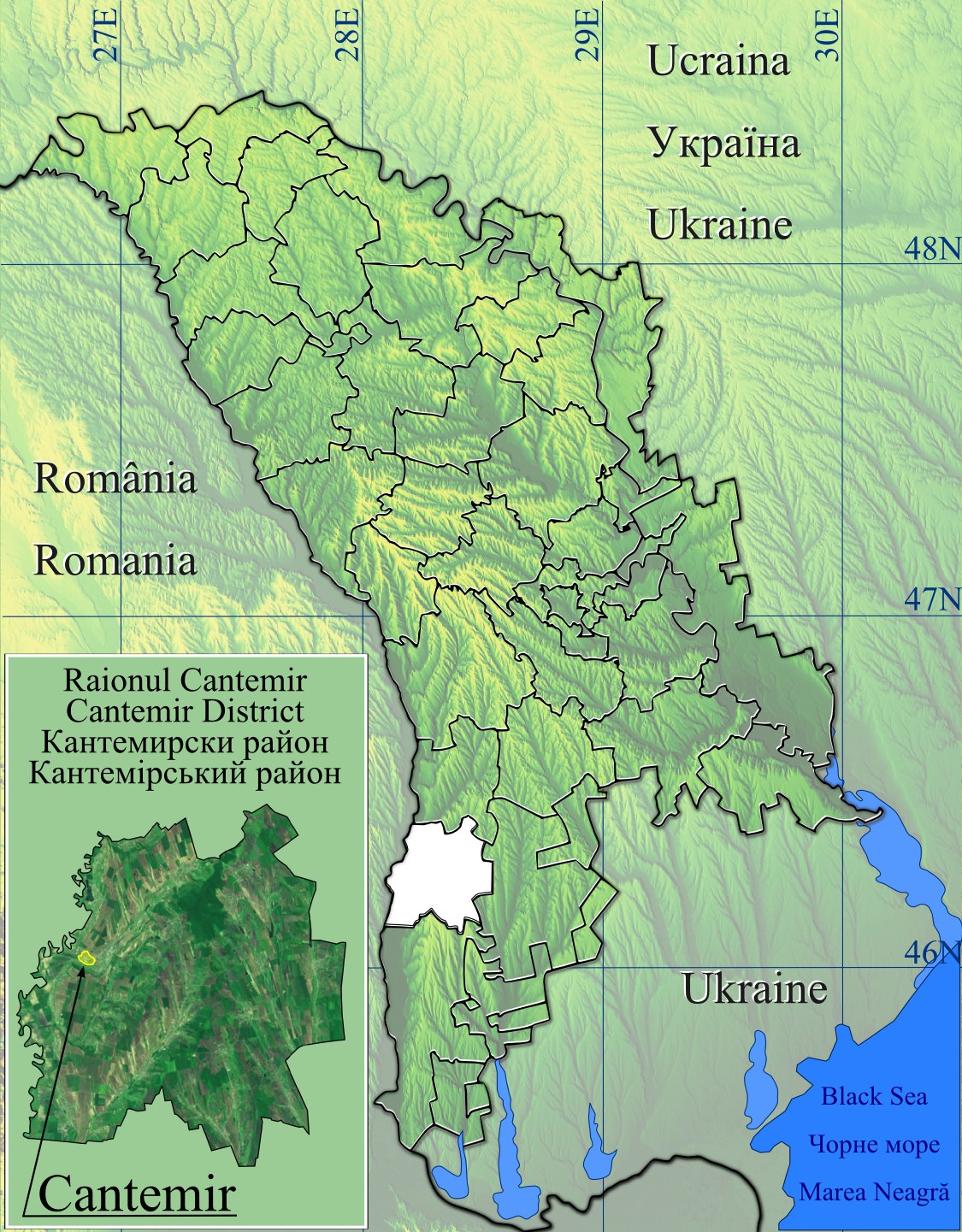
- Location within Cantemir
- Coordinates: 46°15′25″N 28°20′22″E
- Country: Moldova
- Established: 1469

Government
  - Mayor: Ion Bîzu (PDM)
- Elevation: 169 m (554 ft)

Population (2014 census)
  - Total: 2,170
- Time zone: UTC+2 (EET)
  - Summer (DST): UTC+3 (EEST)
- Postal code: MD-7319

Cîrpești is a village in Cantemir District, Moldova.
