= Cantemir, Moldova =

Cantemir
- Town
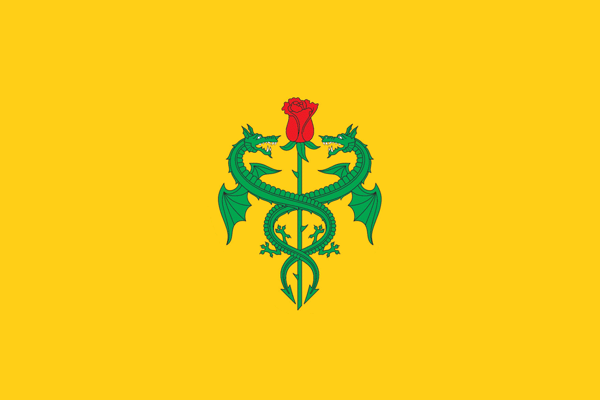
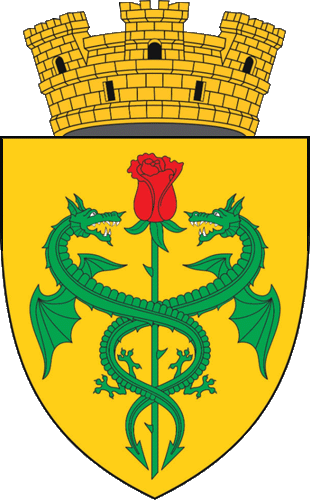
- Flag Coat of arms

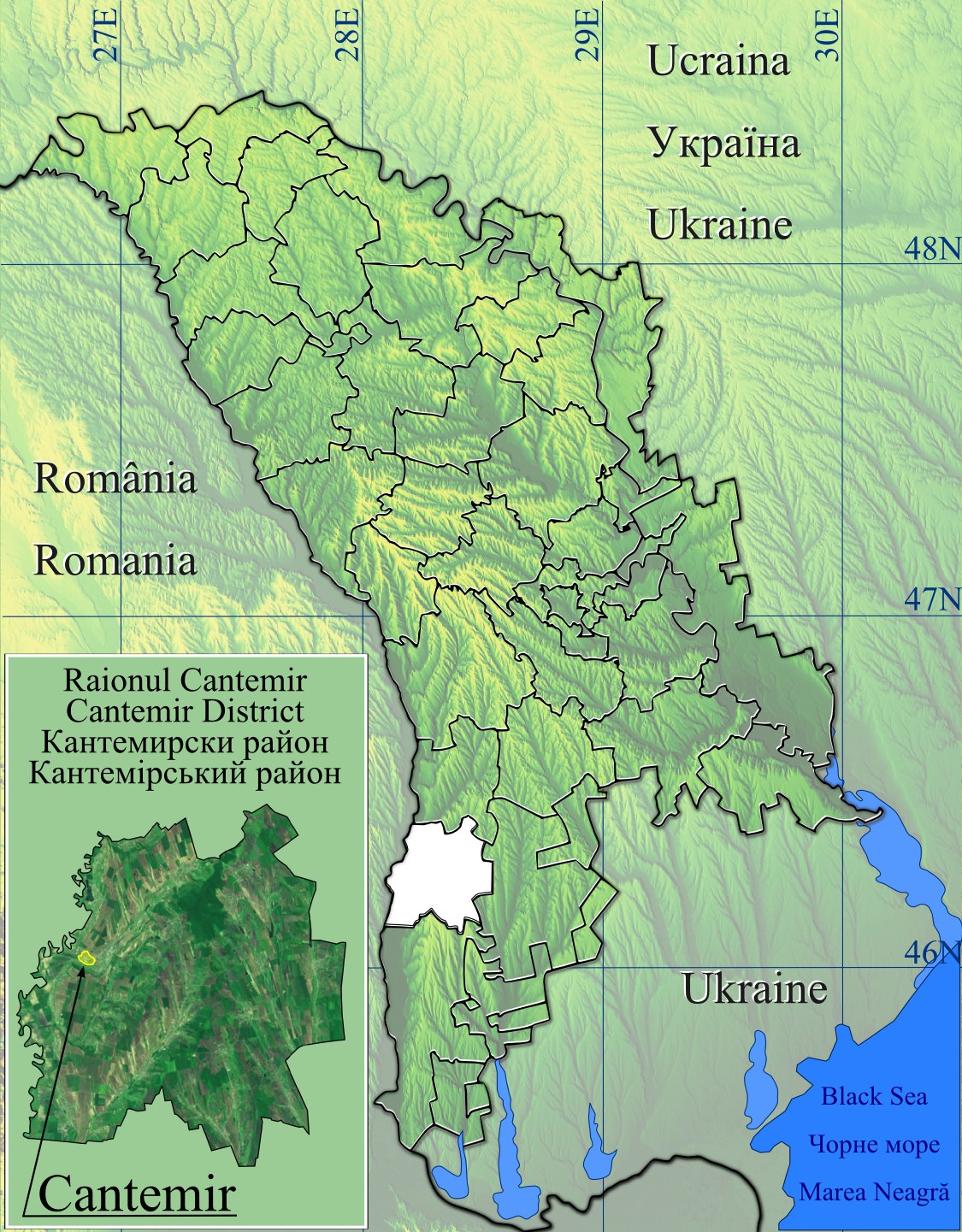
- Location within Moldova
- Coordinates: 46°16′N 28°13′E
- Country: Moldova
- County: Cantemir District

Area
  - Total: 2.390 km^{2} (0.923 sq mi)

Population (2014)
  - Total: 3,429
- Time zone: UTC+2 (EET)
  - Summer (DST): UTC+3 (EEST)
- Area code: +373 273
- Climate: Cfb

Cantemir (Romanian pronunciation: [kanteˈmir]) is a city in Moldova. It is located in the south-western part of the country, in the old Bessarabia region. It is the largest city and administrative center of Cantemir District. Spread across an area of 2.39 km^{2} (0.92 sq mi), the town had a population of 3,429 inhabitants in 2014.

== Geography ==
Cantemir is located in Cantemir District of Moldova. It is located in the southeastern Europe and in the north-western part of Moldova. Spread across an area of 31.4 km^{2} (12.1 sq mi), it is one of 29 sub-divisions (city of Cantemir and 28 communes) in the district. It is part of the Bessarabia region.

== Demographics ==
Historical population

Year	Pop.	±%
1979	2,276	—
1989	5,320	+133.7%

Year	Pop.	±%
2004	3,872	−27.2%
2014	3,429	−11.4%

According to the 2014 census, the population of Cantemir was 3,429 inhabitants, a decrease compared to the previous census in 2004, when 3,872 inhabitants were registered. Of these, 1,631 were men and 1,798 were women. The population is further projected to reduce over the next few decades. The city had a Human Development Index of 0.699 in 2015. About 596 inhabitants were under the age of fourteen, and 189 inhabitants were above the age of 65 years. The entire population lived in urban areas. The town had an expatriate population of 240 individuals, of whom 33 belonged to the European Union and 207 belonged to the Commonwealth of Independent States. Moldovans formed the major ethnic group (72.9%), with Russians (5.7%), Romanians (5.4%) and Ukrainians (3.7%) forming a significant minority. The town had a significant Jewish population before the Second World War. Moldovan language was the most spoken language, spoken to by 2,021 (47.7%) inhabitants, with Russian and Romanian spoken by significant minorities.

Ethnic composition of Cantemir (2014)
1. Moldovans* (72.9%)
2. Romanians (5.72%)
3. Bulgarians (9.46%)
4. Russians (5.37%)
5. Ukrainians (3.48%)
6. Others (3.04%)
:Linguistic composition of Cantemir (2014)
1. Moldovan* (59.2%)
2. Romanian (20.5%)
3. Russian (14.0%)
4. Bulgarian (4.19%)
5. Ukrainian (1.23%)
6. Other (0.91%)

Footnotes:

* There is an ongoing controversy regarding the ethnic identification of Moldovans and Romanians.

* Moldovan language is one of the two local names for the Romanian language in Moldova. In 2013, the Constitutional Court of Moldova interpreted that Article 13 of the constitution is superseded by the Declaration of Independence, thus giving official status to the name Romanian.
