= Călin Vieru =

Moldovan politician (born 1965)

Member of the Moldovan Parliament
- In office 22 April 2009 – 28 December 2010
- Parliamentary group: Liberal Democratic Party

Personal details
- Born: 29 June 1965 (age 61) Chișinău, Moldavian SSR, Soviet Union
- Party: Liberal Democratic Party; Alliance for European Integration (2009–present)
- Spouse: Ina
- Relations: Grigore Vieru (father)
- Children: 2

Călin Vieru (born 29 June 1965) is a Moldovan politician.

== Biography ==
Călin Vieru was born to Raisa and Grigore Vieru. He has been a member of the Parliament of Moldova since May 2009.
