= Cantemir District =

Coordinates: 46°15′N 28°20′E

Cantemir
- District (Raion)
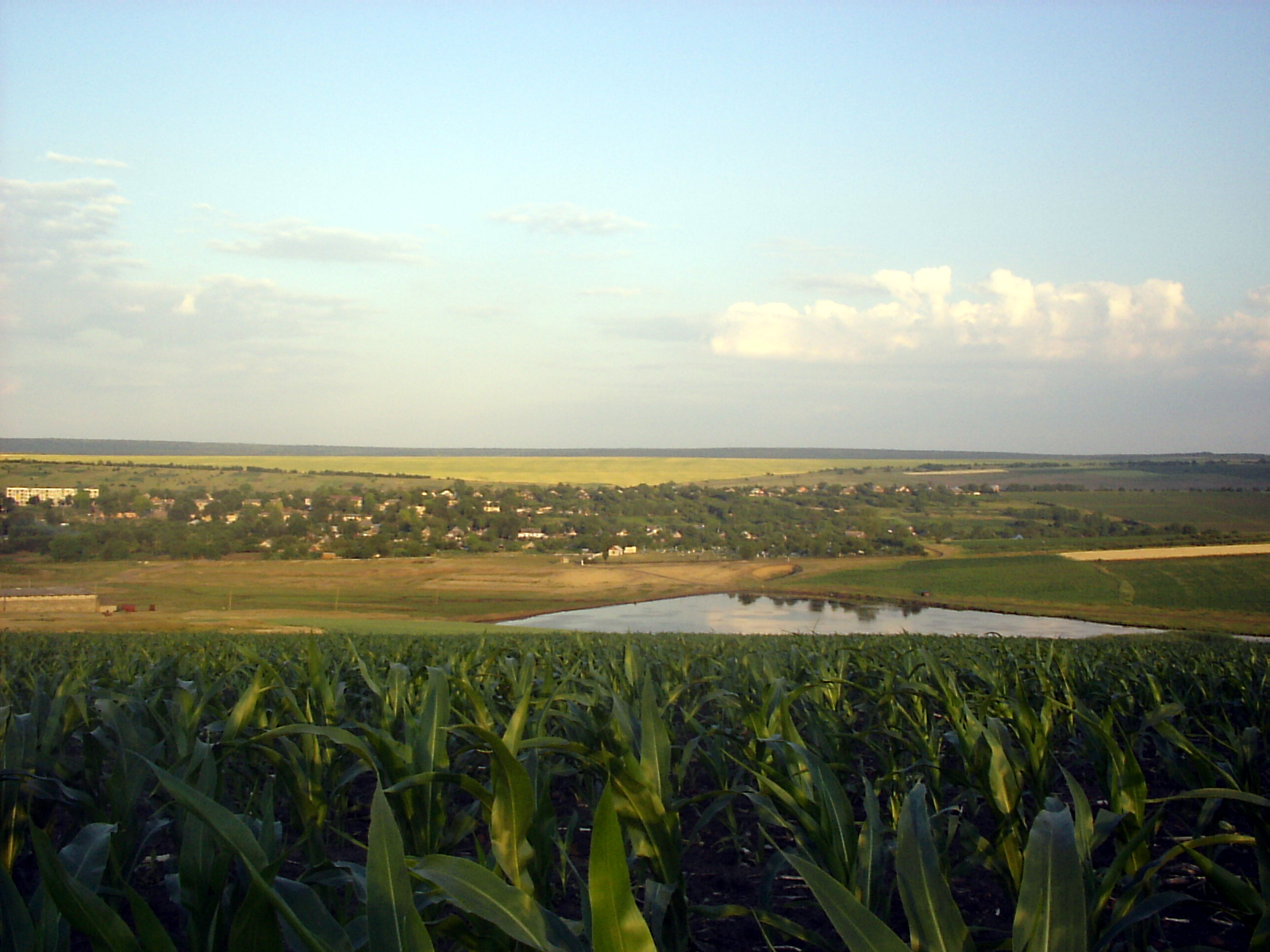
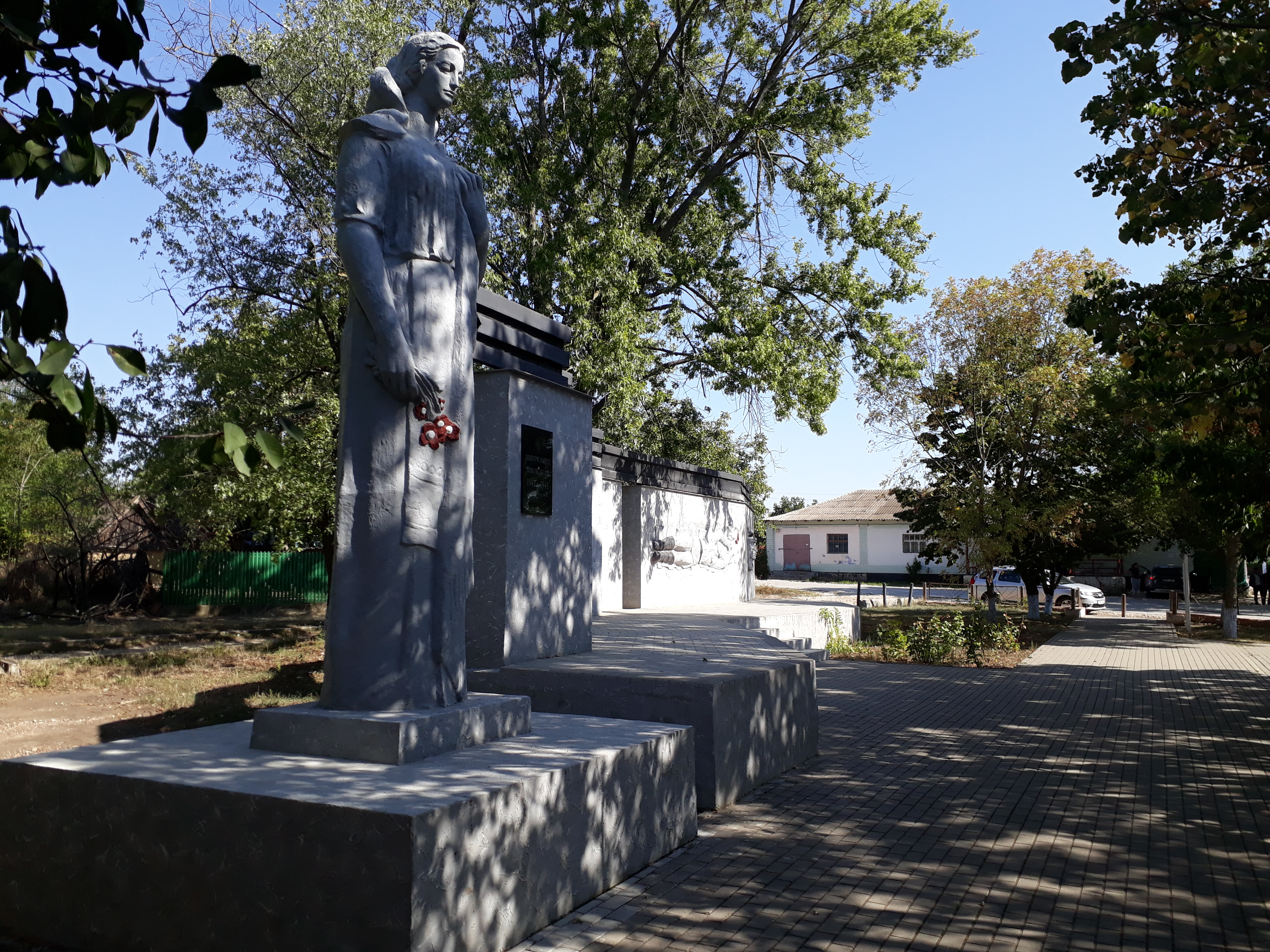
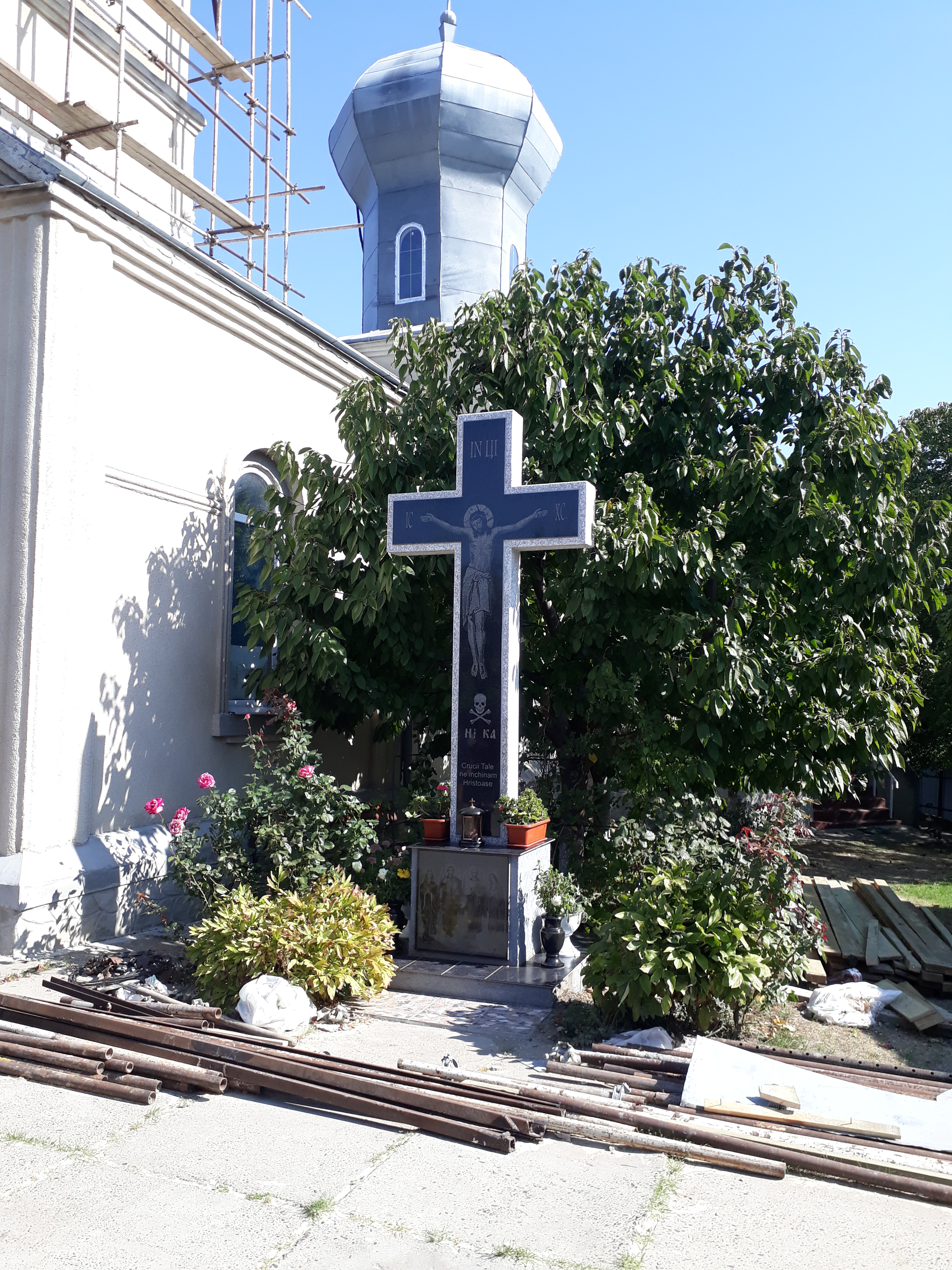
- From the top, View of Vișniovca, Capaclia War Memorial, Saint Michael church

- Flag

- Country: Republic of Moldova
- Administrative center (Oraş-reşedinţă): Cantemir
- Established: 2002

Government
  - Raion President: Pavel Culicovschi (PAS, 2023)

Area
  - Total: 868.7 km^{2} (335.4 sq mi)
- Elevation: 301 m (988 ft)

Population (2024)
  - Total: 33,181
  - Density: 38.20/km^{2} (98.93/sq mi)
- Time zone: UTC+2 (EET)
  - Summer (DST): UTC+3 (EEST)
- Area code: +373 73
- Car plates: CT

Cantemir (Romanian pronunciation: [kanteˈmir]) is a district (Romanian: raion) in the south of Moldova, with the administrative center at Cantemir. As of the 2024 Census, its population was 33,181.

== History ==
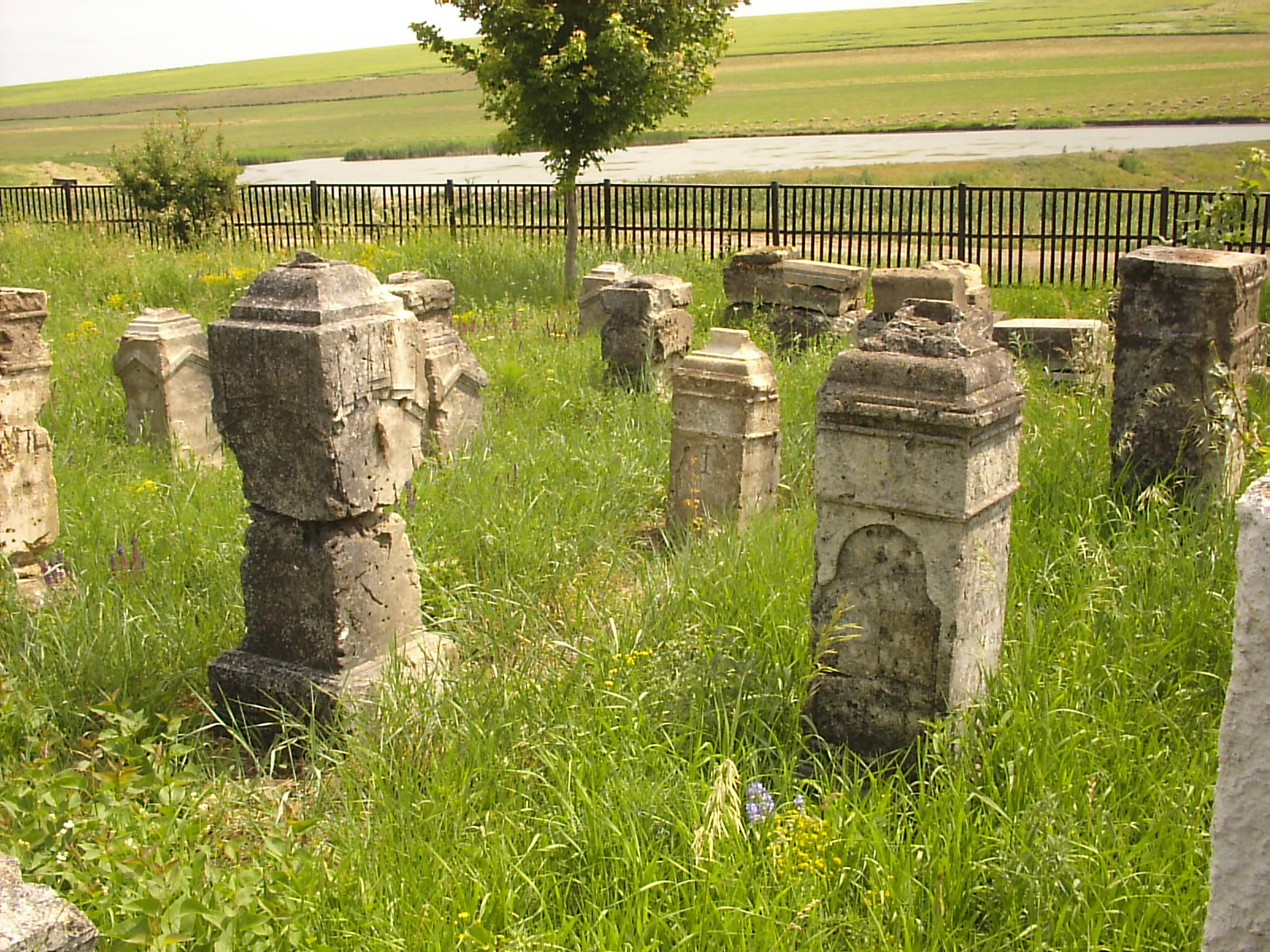
German cemetery in Visneuca

Localities with the earliest documentary attestation of the district are: Haragîș, Stoianeuca, Lărguța, Cîrpești localities approved for the first time in the period 1443–1489. In the 16th and 17th centuries, most of all to develop trade, agriculture and there is a significant population increase. In 1812, after the Russo-Turkish War (1806–12), is the occupation of Basarabia, Russian Empire during this period (1812–1856, 1878–1917), there is an intense russification of the native population. In 1856–78, after the Crimean War district is part of the Romania. In 1918 after the collapse of the Russian Empire, Bessarabia united with Romania in this period (1918–40, 1941–44), the district is part of the Ismail County. In 1940 after Molotov–Ribbentrop Pact, Basarabia is occupied by the USSR. In 1991 as a result of the proclamation of Independence of Moldova, part and residence of the Cahul County (1991–2003), and in 2003 became administrative unit of Moldova.

== Geography ==
Cantemir district is located in the south part of the Republic of Moldova. Neighborhood has the following districts: Leova District in north, east Gagauzia, Cahul District in southern and border state in west to Romania, on the river Prut. The relief is generally hilly plain with the maximum altitude is 301 m hill Tigheci (Tigheci Plateau) in the western part of district. Minimum altitude 10–15 m (Lower Prut Plain ). Erosion processes with a medium intensity.

=== Climate ===
Temperate continental climate with an annual average district temperature 11 °C (52 °F). July average temperature 23 °C (73 °F), in January −3 °C (27 °F). Annual precipitation 450–550 mm. Average wind speed 3–6 m \ s.

=== Fauna ===
Typical European steppe fauna, with the presence of such mammals such as foxes, hedgehogs, deer, wild boar, polecat, wild cat, ermine and others. Of birds: partridges, crows, eagles, starling, swallow and more.

=== Flora ===
Forests occupy 11.3% of the district are complemented by tree species such as oak, ash, hornbeam, linden, maple, walnut and others. From plants: wormwood, knotweed, fescue, nettle and many others.

=== Rivers ===
The main river in the district is Prut, crosses district in the west. Its tributaries are usually short. Most lakes are artificial origin.

== Administrative subdivisions ==
- Localities: 51
  - Administrative center: Cantemir
    - Cities: Cantemir
      - Villages: 24
        - Communes: 26

== Demographics ==
As of the 2024 Census, the district population was 33,181 of which 8% were urban and 92% were rural.

=== Ethnic groups ===
Ethnic group	% of total
Moldovans *	85.8
Romanians *	7.2
Bulgarians	4.4
Ukrainians	1.1
Russians	0.7
Gagauz	0.6
Romani	0.1
Other	0.1
Undeclared	0.0

Footnote: * There is an ongoing controversy regarding the ethnic identification of Moldovans and Romanians.

=== Religion ===
- Christians - 99.3%
  - Orthodox Christians - 96.5%
  - Protestant - 2.8%
  - Catholics -0.0%
- Other - 0.1%
- No Religion - 0.4%
- Not declared - 0.2%

== Economy ==
The district is in total 18,186 registered businesses. The share of agricultural land is 49,602 ha (57.0%) of them occupy 40 902 ha (47.0%) of arable land, plantations of orchards - 2272 ha (2.6%), vineyards - 5660 ha (6.5%), pastures - 11,500 ha (13.2% ). Main crops: cereals (wheat, oats), sunflower, canola, soybeans, vegetables.

== Education ==
At activates Cantemir district, 41 educational institutions. Total number of students, including 8967 children in schools, 130 students in vocational school in the Cantemir city.

== Politics ==
Cantemir district granted priority mainly right-wing parties. In Moldova represented by the AEI. PCRM is a continuous fall in percentage the last three elections.

During the last three elections AEI had an increase of 47.5%

Parliament elections results
Year	AEI	PCRM
2010	55.59% 14,573	34.80% 9,003
July 2009	55.83% 14,293	40.81% 10,445
April 2009	39.25% 9,879	47.11% 11,858

=== Elections ===
Summary of 28 November 2010 Parliament of Moldova election results in Cantemir District
Parties and coalitions	Votes	%	+/−
Liberal Democratic Party of Moldova	9,124	34.80	+9.87
Party of Communists of the Republic of Moldova	9,003	34.34	−6.47
Democratic Party of Moldova	3,143	11,99	+1.92
Liberal Party	2,037	7.77	−3.27
European Action Movement	1,507	5.75	+5.75
Party Alliance Our Moldova	269	1.03	-8.76
Other Party	1,139	4.32	+0.96
Total (turnout 57.98%)	26,379	100.00	

== Culture ==
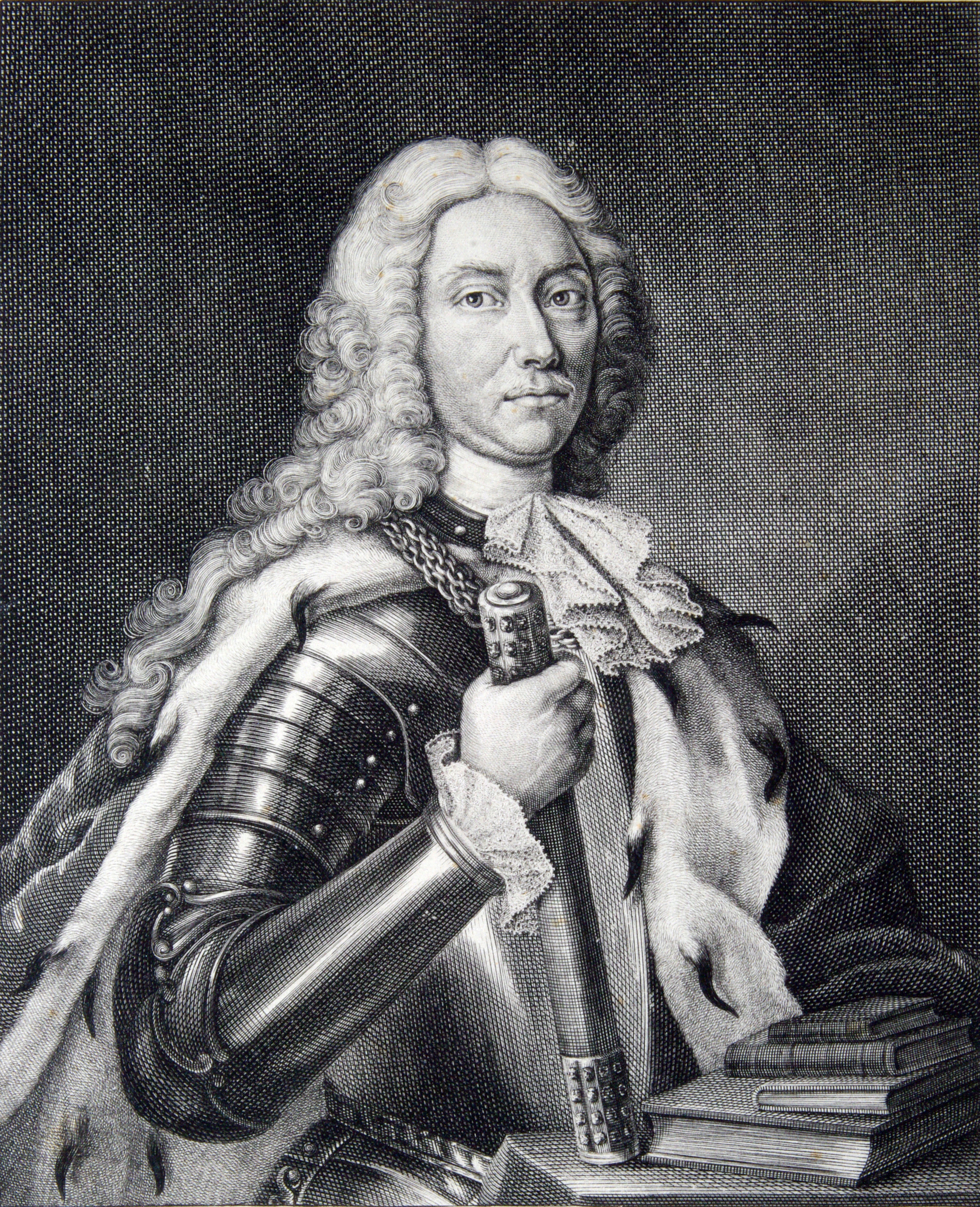
Since 1967 the district name is Cantemir, as a tribute to writer, scientist, and Prince of Moldavia Dimitrie Cantemir

In district works: 3 museums, 76 artistic including 24 bands holding the title of the band modern, 46 libraries, 43 houses and community centers.

== Health ==
The district works: a hospital with general fund of 220 beds. A center of family doctors in the composition of which are 25 offices of the family doctor, 4 health centers. In health care population of Cantemir district operates 64 doctor's, 263 average staff, nurses, 254 auxiliary health staff.
