= Vishnevka, Volgograd Oblast =

Vishnevka Вишневка
- Settlement
- Location within Volgograd Oblast Location within Russia
- Coordinates: 49°25′N 46°46′E
- Country: Russia
- Region: Volgograd Oblast
- District: Pallasovsky District
- Time zone: UTC+4:00

Vishnevka (Russian: Вишневка) is a rural locality (a settlement) and the administrative center of Stepnovskoye Rural Settlement, Pallasovsky District, Volgograd Oblast, Russia. The population was 1,280 as of 2010. There are 15 streets.

== Geography ==
Vishnevka is located on the Caspian Depression, 77 km south of Pallasovka (the district's administrative centre) by road. Zhanibek is the nearest rural locality.
