= Cociulia =

- Village
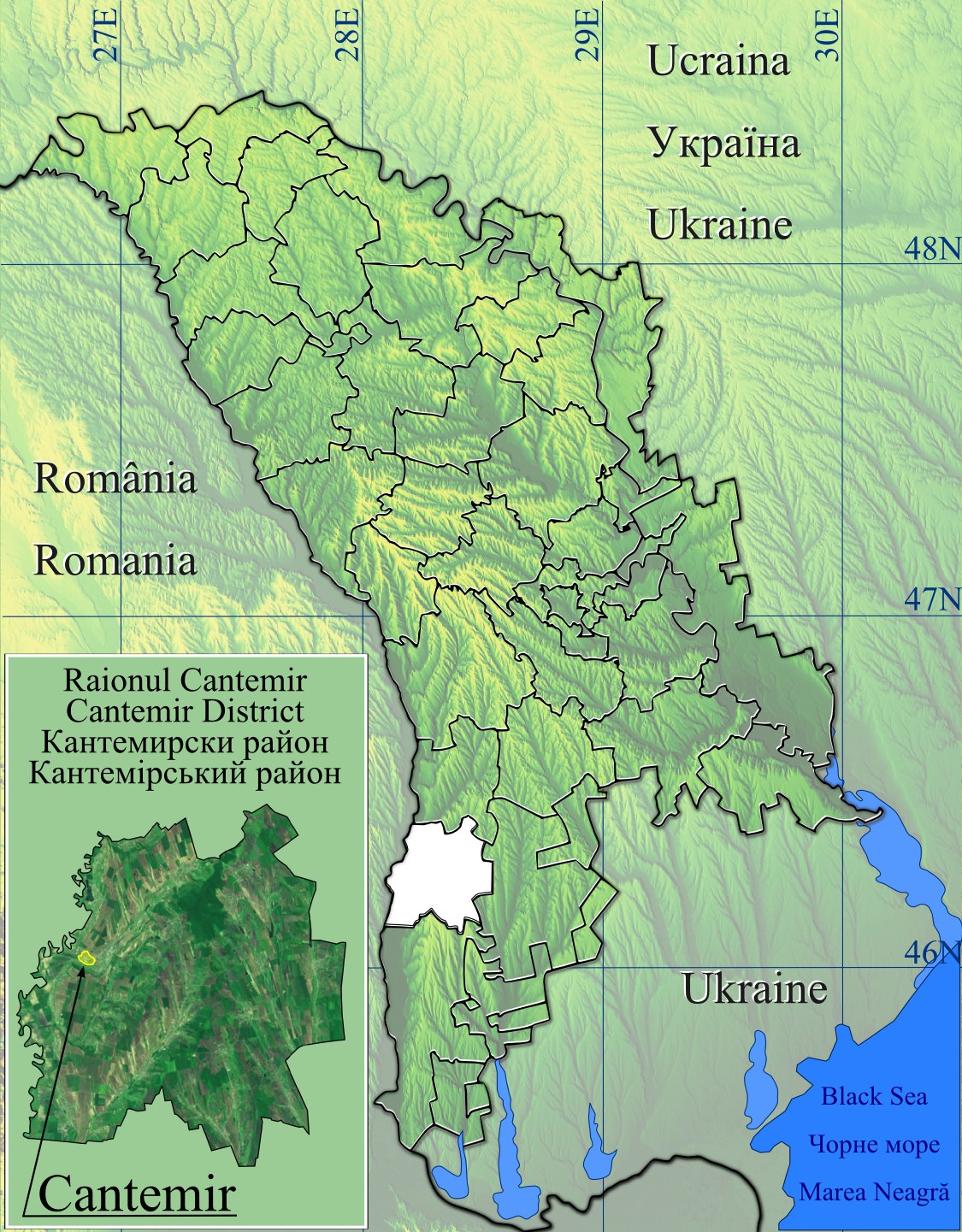
- Location within Cantemir
- Coordinates: 46°21′28″N 28°24′53″E
- Country: Moldova

Government
  - Mayor: Vladimir Putregai (PLDM)

Area
  - Total: 4.85 km^{2} (1.87 sq mi)
- Elevation: 198 m (650 ft)

Population (2014 census)
  - Total: 2,831
- Time zone: UTC+2 (EET)
  - Summer (DST): UTC+3 (EEST)
- Postal code: MD-7321

Cociulia is a village in Cantemir District, Moldova.
