= Vishnevka, Bizhbulyaksky District, Republic of Bashkortostan =

Vishnyovka Вишнёвка
- Village
- Location within Bashkortostan Location within Russia
- Coordinates: 53°55′N 54°19′E
- Country: Russia
- Region: Bashkortostan
- District: Bizhbulyaksky District
- Time zone: UTC+5:00

Vishnyovka (Russian: Вишнёвка) is a rural locality (a village) in Kosh-Yelginsky Selsoviet, Bizhbulyaksky District, Bashkortostan, Russia. The population was 18 as of 2010. There is 1 street.

== Geography ==
Vishnevka is located 51 km north of Bizhbulyak (the district's administrative centre) by road. Sosnovka is the nearest rural locality.
