= Vishnevka, Altai Krai =

Vishnevka Вишнёвка
- Selo
- Location within Altai Krai Location within Russia
- Coordinates: 51°21′N 81°32′E
- Country: Russia
- Region: Altai Krai
- District: Rubtsovsky District
- Time zone: UTC+7:00

Vishnevka (Russian: Вишнёвка) is a rural locality (a selo) and the administrative center of Vishnyovsky Selsoviet, Rubtsovsky District, Altai Krai, Russia. The population was 365 as of 2013. There are 5 streets.

== Geography ==
Vishnevka is located 40 km southeast of Rubtsovsk (the district's administrative centre) by road. Romanovka and Novonikolayevka are the nearest rural localities.
