= Vishnevka, Voronezh Oblast =

Vishnevka Вишнёвка
- Settlement
- Location within Voronezh Oblast Location within Russia
- Coordinates: 51°50′N 39°50′E
- Country: Russia
- Region: Voronezh Oblast
- District: Verkhnekhavsky District
- Time zone: UTC+3:00

Vishnevka (Russian: Вишнёвка) is a rural locality (a settlement) and the administrative center of Spasskoye Rural Settlement, Verkhnekhavsky District, Voronezh Oblast, Russia. The population was 808 as of 2010. There are 6 streets.

== Geography ==
Vishnevka is located 8 km west of Verkhnyaya Khava (the district's administrative centre) by road. NIIOKH is the nearest rural locality.
