= Yulia Tsibulskaya =

Moldovan-Russian composer (born 1933)

Yulia Tsibulskaya (Romanian: Iulia Țibulschi, Russian: Юлия Георгиевна Цибульская, Polish: Julia Cybulska, born 15 June 1933) is a Moldovan-Russian composer.

== Biography ==
Yulia Tsibulskaya was born in Leova, Romania. She graduated from the Chișinău musical school (1954), the faculty of the theory and composition of the N. A. Rimsky-Korsakov Leningrad Conservatory (1960). She studied folklore themes in the works of Karol Szymanowski and Frédéric Chopin.

The teachers of the conservatory who determined Yulia Tsibulskaya’s further creative way were V. N. Salmanov (orchestration, composition), Alla Petrovna Maslakovets (Maria Yudina’s disciple, piano), Theodosius Antonovich Rubtsov (folklore), Alexander Naumovich Dolzhanskiy (polyphony).

From 1960 till 1974, Yulia Tsibulskaya was a teacher at the Chișinău conservatory (the G. Musicescu College of Arts), from 1974 till 1977 — a scientific collaborator at the department of ethnography and art studies, attached to the Academy of Sciences of the Moldavian SSR. From 1977 till 1988, she was a musical editor in the “Literatura artistică” publishing house.

At present she resides in Nuremberg, Germany.

== Decorations and titles ==
- A member of the USSR Union of Composers (1977).
- The N. K. Krupskaya prize from the Ministry of Education of the Moldavian SSR — for an important contribution in the musical education of the young people.
- Honored artist of Moldavia (1992).
- A prize from UNESCO for the best chorus composition for a mixed chorus (“Lullaby”) (1995).

== Music ==
- The forest is beautiful with a flower (Iu.Ţibulschi – Gr.Vieru) on YouTube
- Christ is not to blame (Iu. Ţibulschi – Gr. Vieru) on YouTube
- Songs by Iulia Tibulschi, performed by the author.
- Presentation of the Iulia Tibulschi vinyl disc on YouTube
