= Vishnevka, Amur Oblast =

Vishnevka Вишнёвка
- Selo
- Location within Amur Oblast Location within Russia
- Coordinates: 50°23′N 128°13′E
- Country: Russia
- Region: Amur Oblast
- District: Ivanovsky District
- Time zone: UTC+9:00

Vishnevka (Russian: Вишнёвка) is a rural locality (a selo) in Annovsky Selsoviet of Ivanovsky District, Amur Oblast, Russia. The population was 9 as of 2018. There is 1 street.

== Geography ==
Vishnevka is located near the left bank of the Ivanovka River, 19 km east of Ivanovka (the district's administrative centre) by road. Bolsheozyorka is the nearest rural locality.
