= Vishnevka, Chishminsky District, Republic of Bashkortostan =

Vishnevka Вишнёвка
- Village
- Location within Bashkortostan Location within Russia
- Coordinates: 54°24′N 55°41′E
- Country: Russia
- Region: Bashkortostan
- District: Chishminsky District
- Time zone: UTC+5:00

Vishnevka (Russian: Вишнёвка) is a rural locality (a village) in Ibragimovsky Selsoviet, Chishminsky District, Bashkortostan, Russia. The population was 73 as of 2010. There is 1 dirt road.

== Geography ==
Vishnevka is located 40 km southeast of Chishmy (the district's administrative centre) by road. Repyevka is the nearest rural locality.
