= Vișniovca =

- Village
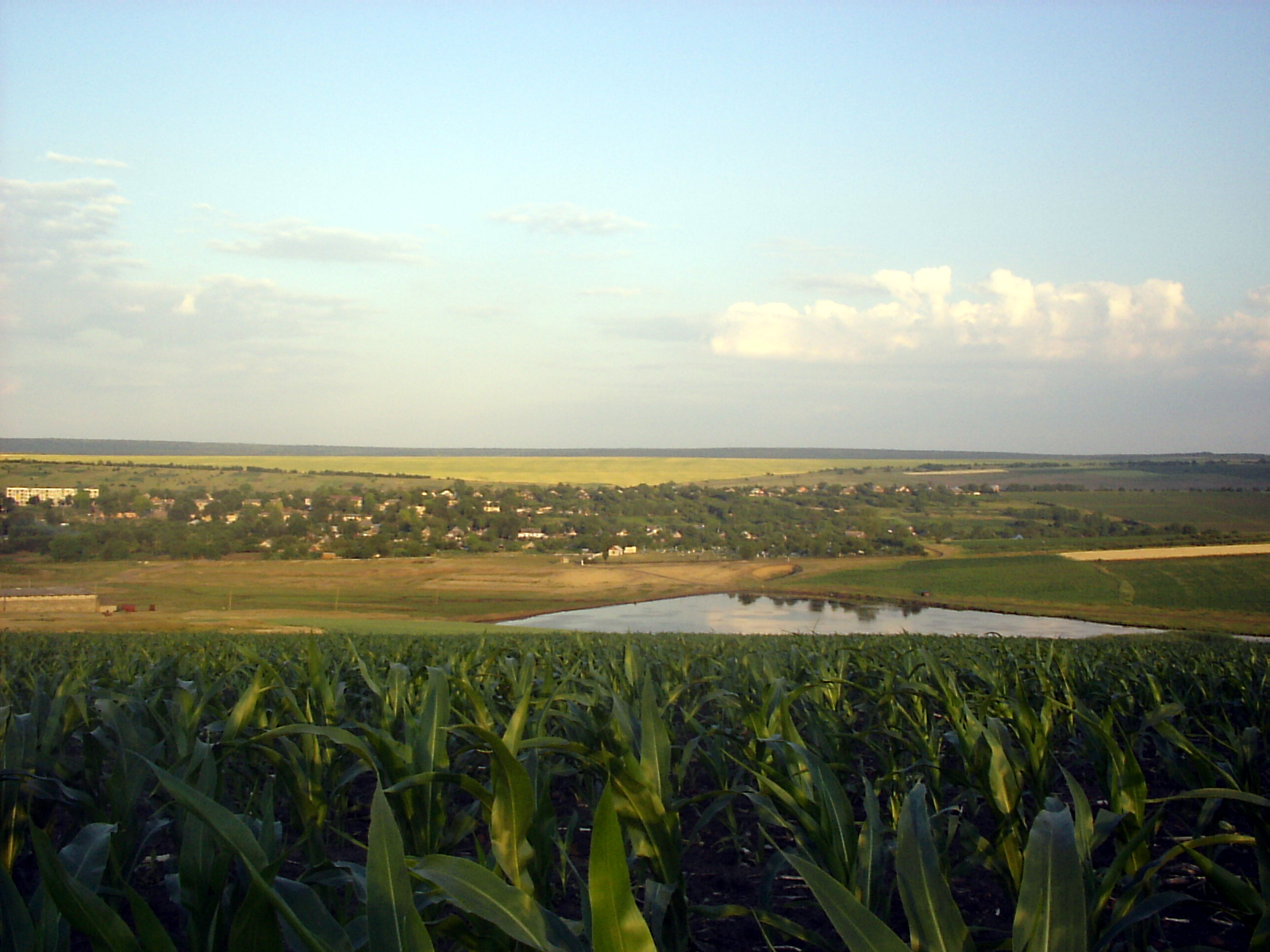

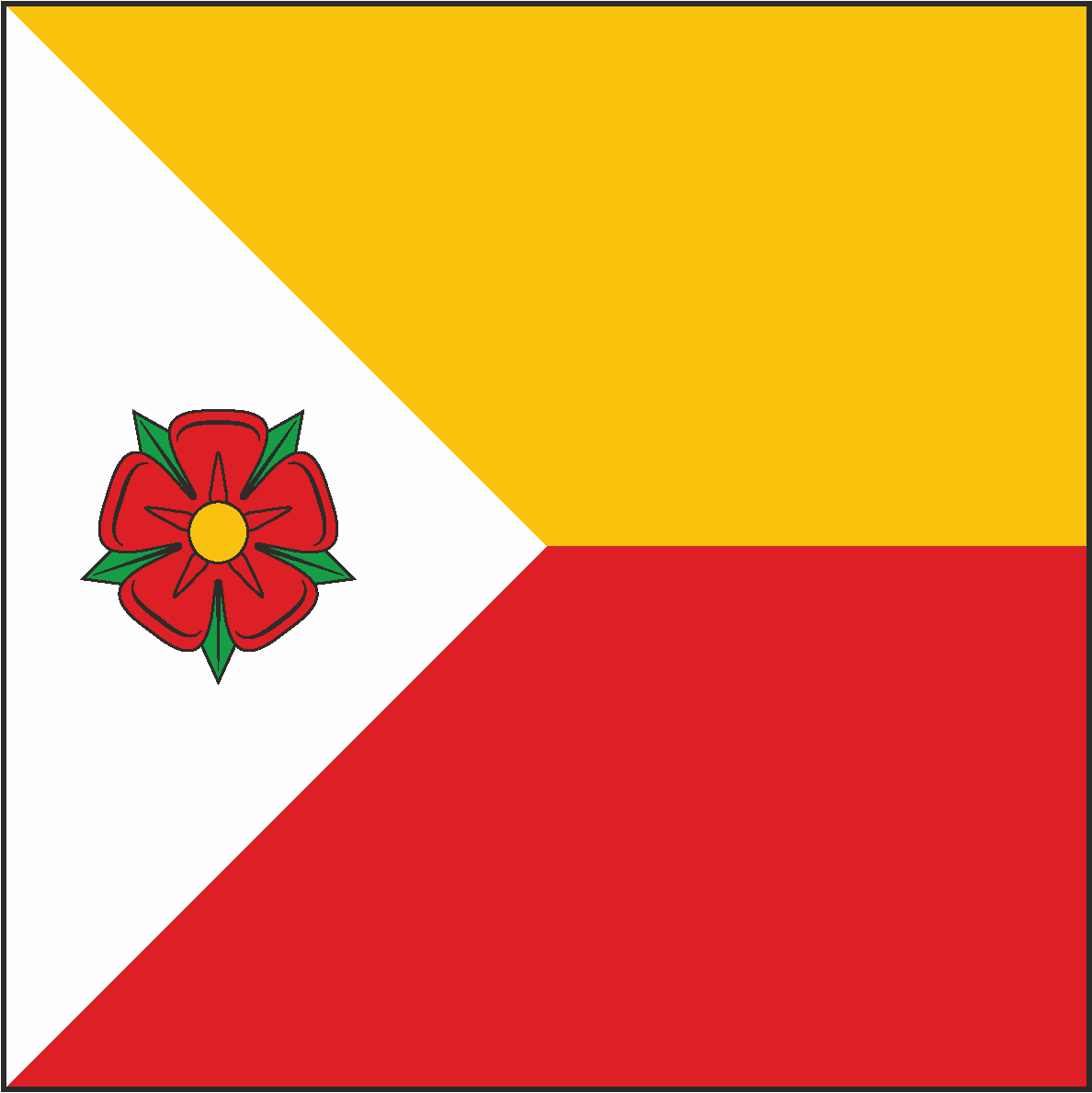
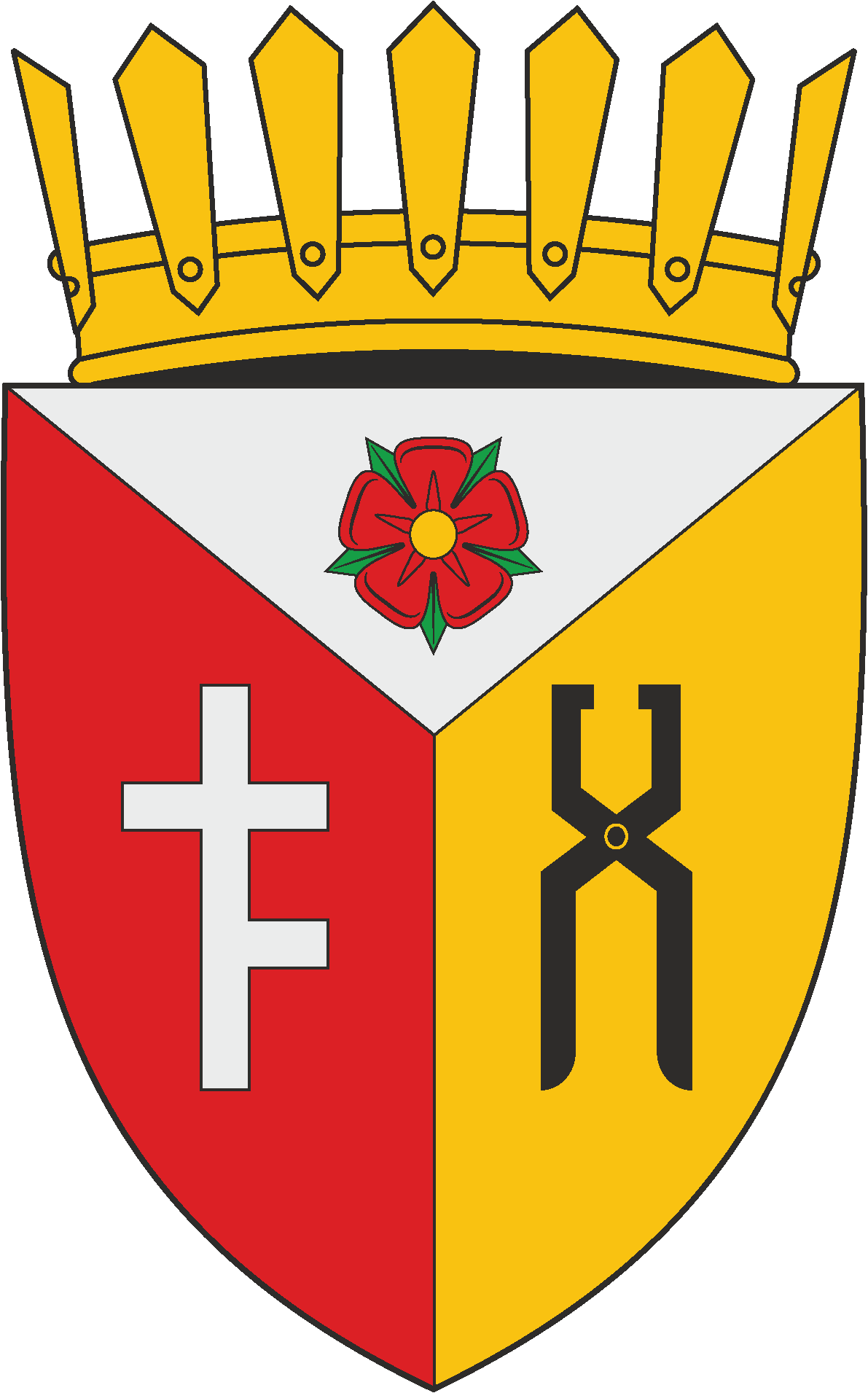
- Flag Seal

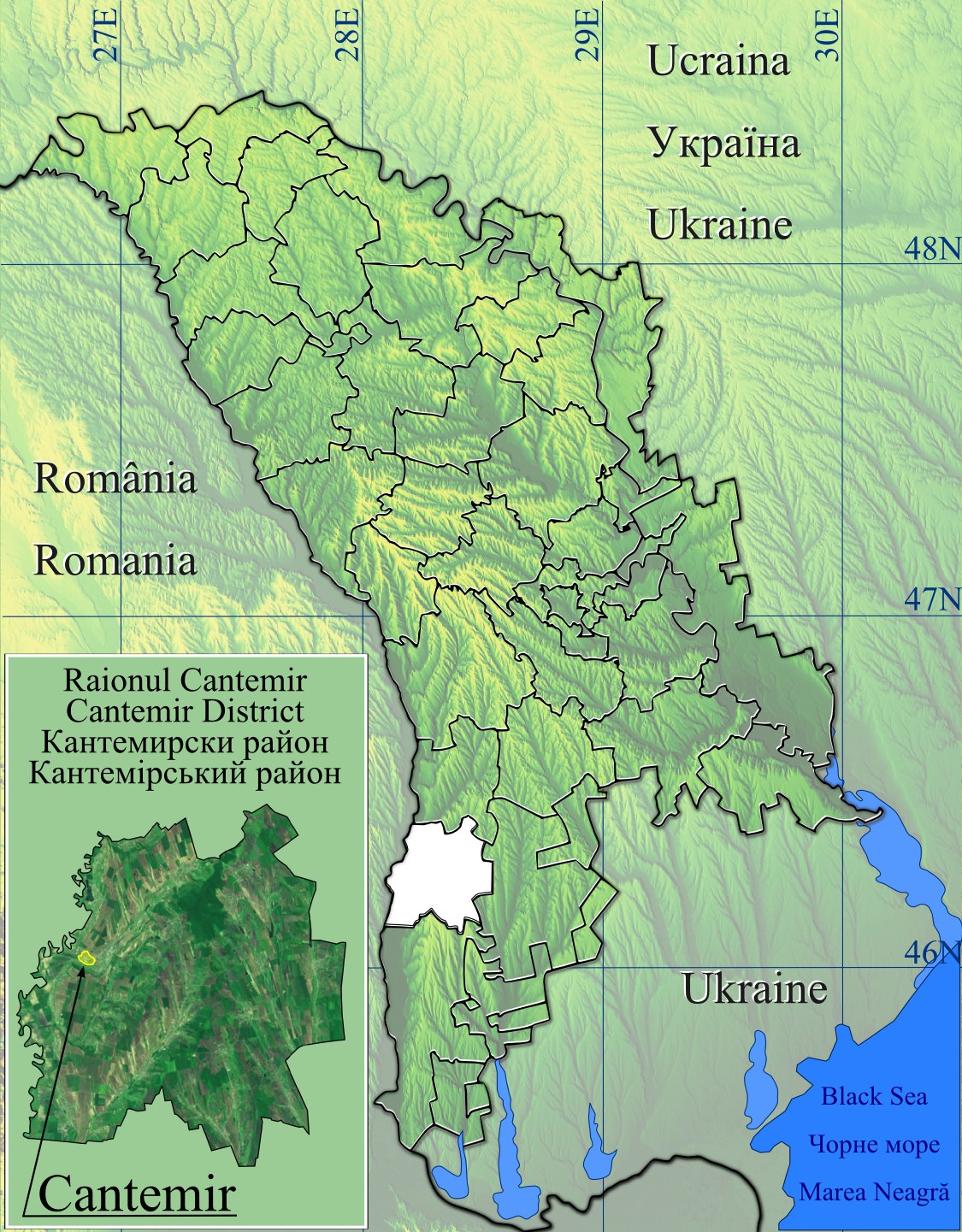
- Location in Moldova
- Coordinates: 46°20′N 28°27′E
- Country: Moldova
- District: Cantemir District
- Elevation: 335 ft (102 m)

Population (2014 census)
  - Total: 1,324
- Time zone: UTC+2 (EET)
  - Summer (DST): UTC+3 (EEST)
- Postal code: MD-7342
- Area code: +373 273 42

Vișniovca is a village in Cantemir District, Moldova.

== Gallery ==
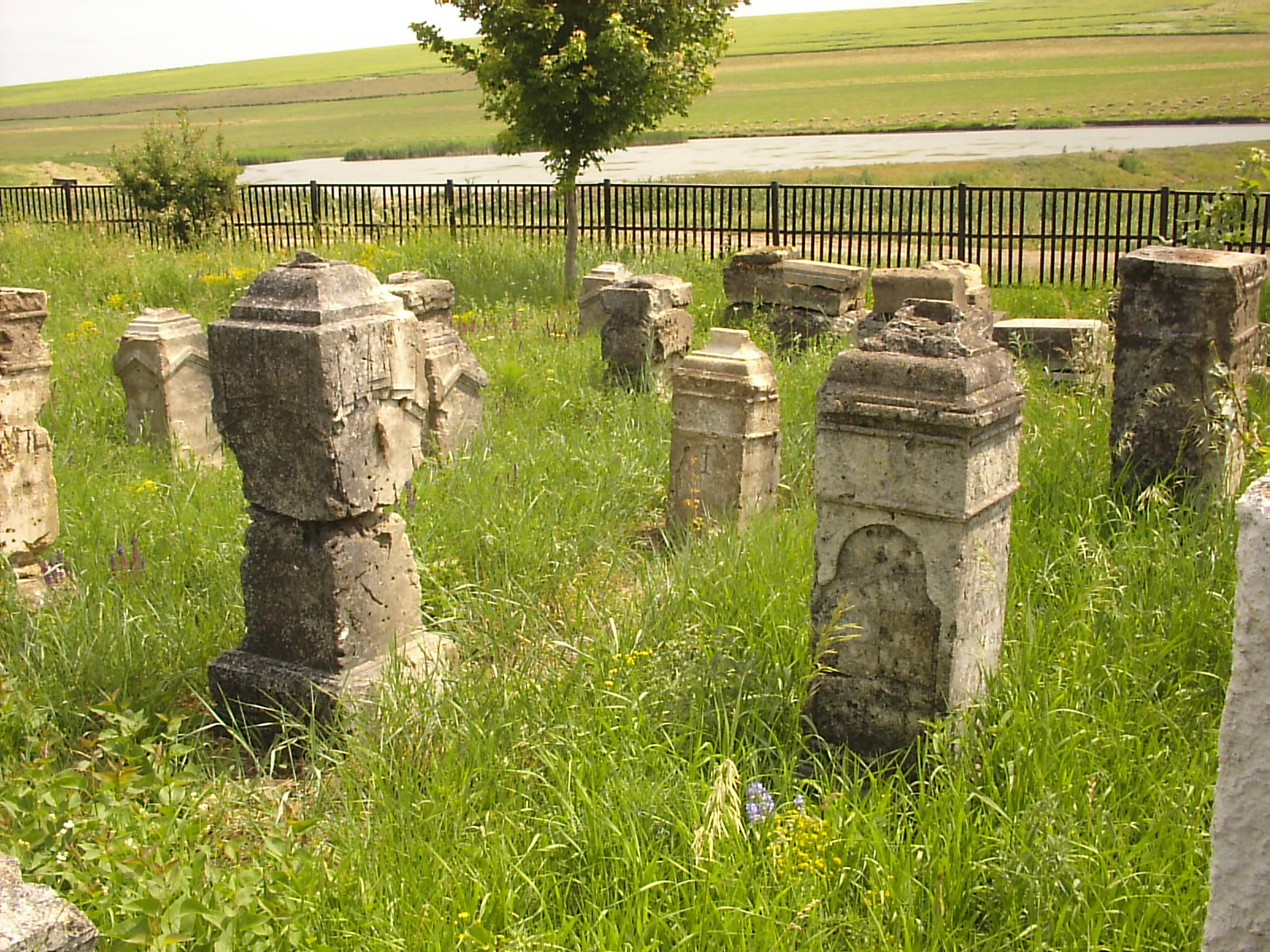

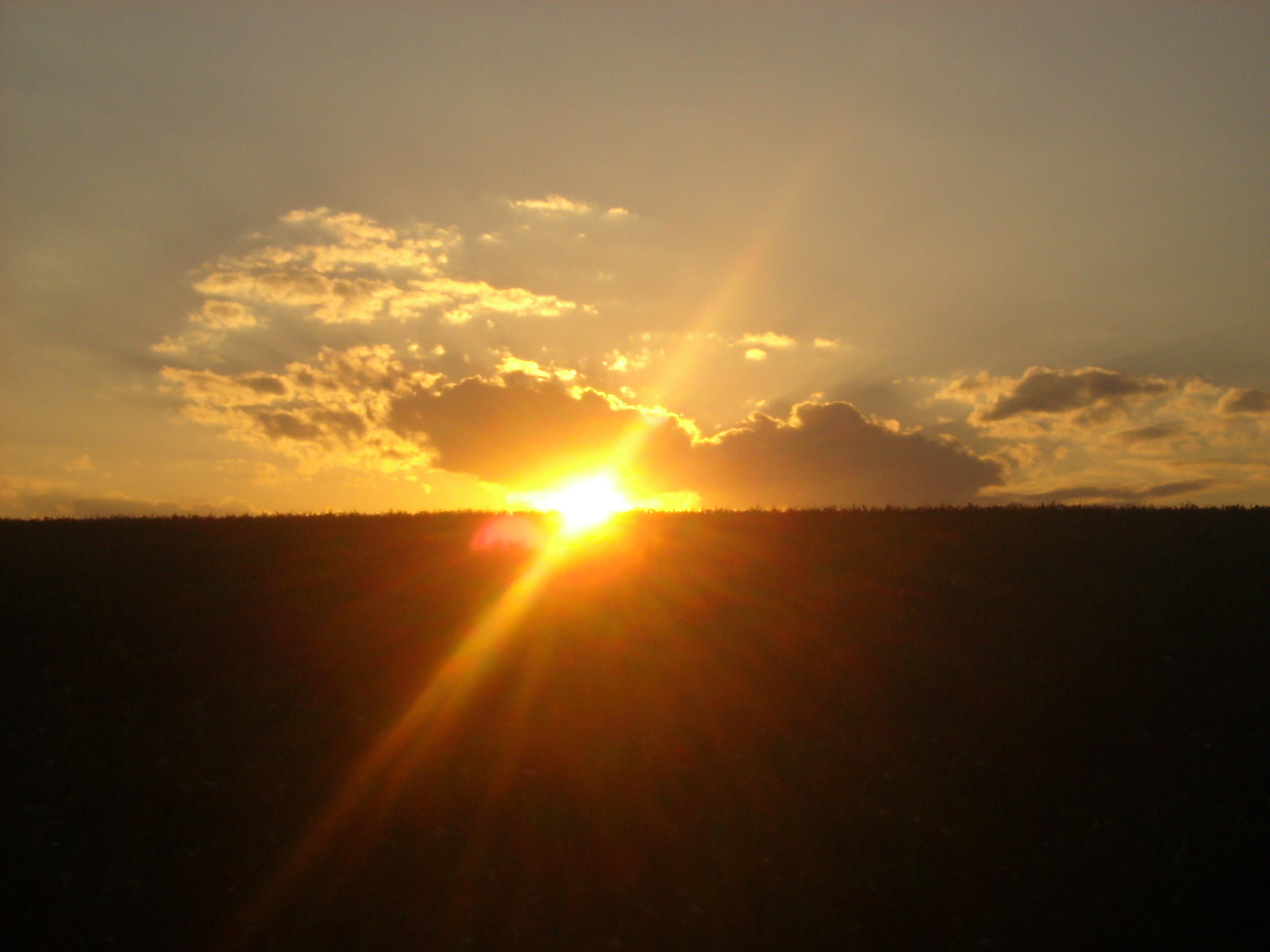

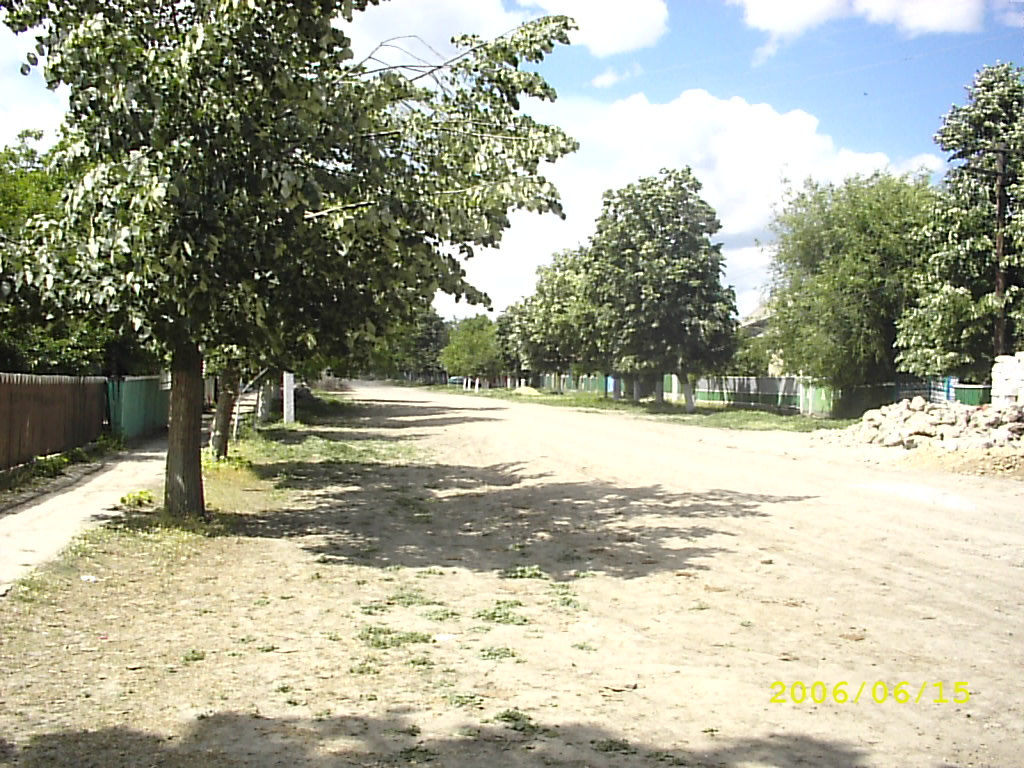

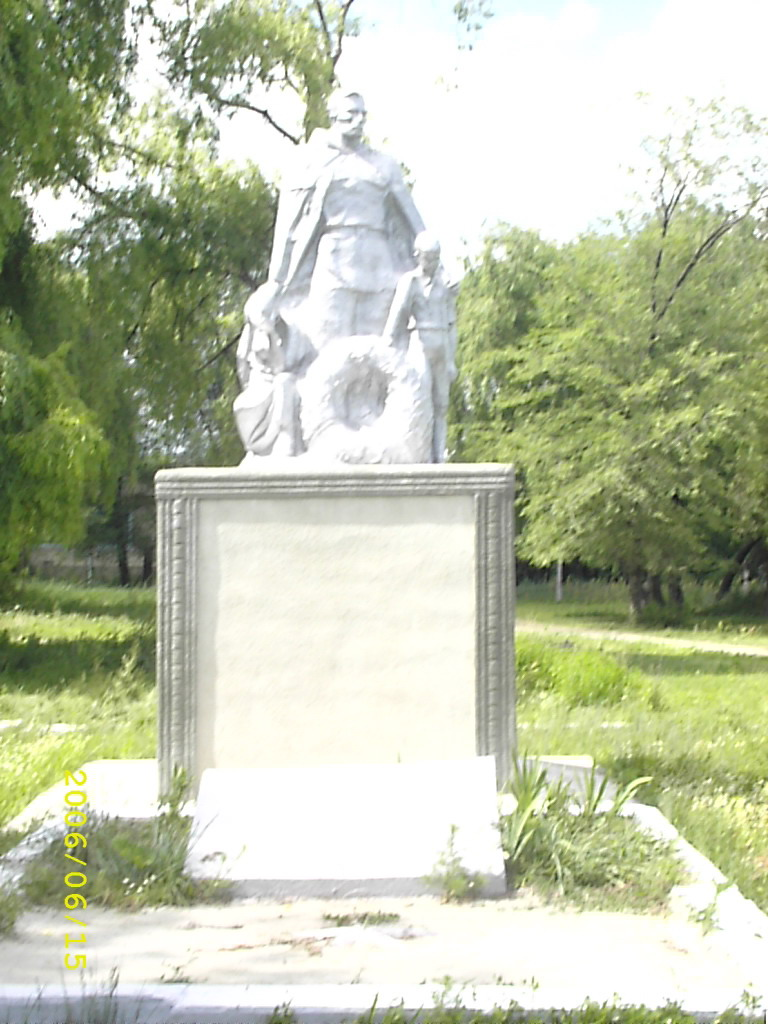
