= Hârtop =

Hârtop or Hîrtop may refer to:

== Places ==
Several places in Romania:

- Hârtop, Suceava, a commune in Suceava County
- Hârtop, a village in Bârgăuani Commune, Neamț County

and in Moldova:

- Hîrtop, Cimișlia, a commune in Cimișlia District
- Hîrtop, Transnistria, a commune in Transnistria
- Hîrtop, a village in Plopi Commune, Cantemir District
- Hîrtop, a village in Scumpia Commune, Fălești District
- Hîrtop, a village in Ghindești Commune, Florești District
- Hîrtop, a village in Băiuș Commune, Leova District
- Hîrtop, a village in Albota de Jos Commune, Taraclia District
- Hîrtop, a village in Pistruieni Commune, Telenești District

== People ==
- Job Hartop, English adventurer
