= Alexandrovka =

Alexandrovka or Aleksandrovka may refer to:

== Modern inhabited localities ==
- Alexandrovka, Russia, several places
- Aleksandrovka, Donbas, a former settlement in Ukraine, Russian Empire
- Aleksandrovka, Kyrgyzstan, a village in Chuy Region, Kyrgyzstan

== Renamed inhabited localities ==
- Bovadzor or Aleksandrovka, a town in Lori Province, Armenia
- Chkalovka or Aleksandrovka, a town in Gegharkunik Province, Armenia
- Donetsk, Ukraine, formerly known as Aleksandrovka
- Gharibjanyan or Aleksandrovka, a town in Shirak Province, Armenia
- Gödəkli or Aleksandrovka, a village in Khachmaz Rayon, Azerbaijan
- Jibek Joly formerly Aleksandrova, a village in Akmola Region, Kazakhstan
- Şəhriyar or Aleksandrovka, a village in Sabirabad Rayon, Azerbaijan
- Saymasay or Aleksandrovka, a village in Almaty Region, Kazakhstan

== See also ==
- Alexandrovca (disambiguation), a list of localities in Moldova
- Oleksandrivka (disambiguation)
