= Căzănești (disambiguation) =

Căzănești may refer to several places in Romania:

- Căzănești, a town in Ialomița County
- Căzănești, Mehedinți, a commune in Mehedinți County
- Căzănești, a village in Vața de Jos Commune, Hunedoara County
- Căzănești, a village in Verguleasa Commune, Olt County
- Căzănești, a village in Ghioroiu Commune, Vâlcea County
- Căzănești, a village in Milcoiu Commune, Vâlcea County
- Căzănești, a village in Râmnicu Vâlcea city, Vâlcea County
- Căzănești, a village in Negrești town, Vaslui County

and in Moldova:

- Căzănești, Telenești, a commune in Telenești District
