= Novodonetske =

Urban locality in Donetsk Oblast, Ukraine

Novodonetske Новодонецьке
- Rural settlement
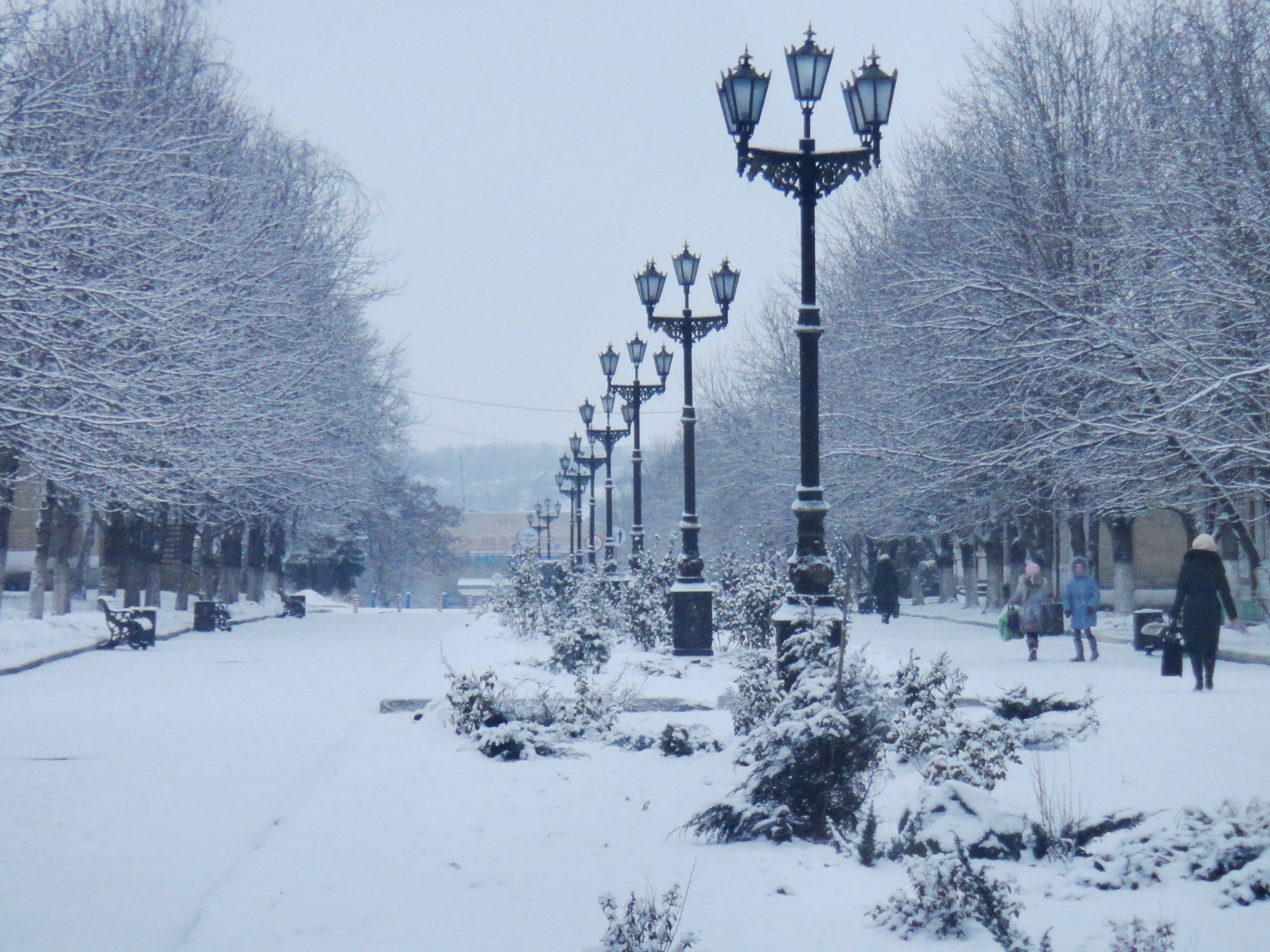
- Interactive map of Novodonetske
- Location of Novodonetske within Donetsk Oblast#Location of Novodonetske within Ukraine Novodonetske (Ukraine)
- Coordinates: 48°38′05″N 36°58′56″E
- Country: Ukraine
- Oblast: Donetsk Oblast
- Raion: Kramatorsk Raion
- Hromada: Novodonetske settlement hromada
- Elevation: 132 m (433 ft)

Population (2022)
  - Total: 5,597
- Time zone: UTC+2 (EET)
  - Summer (DST): UTC+3 (EEST)
- Postal code: 85010—85011
- Area code: +380 6277

Novodonetske (Ukrainian: Новодонецьке) is a rural settlement in Kramatorsk Raion, Donetsk Oblast, eastern Ukraine. It hosts the administration of Novodonetske settlement hromada, one of the hromadas of Ukraine. Prior to 2020, it was located in Dobropillia Municipality. The population is 5,597 (2022 estimate).

== Geography ==
Novodonetske is located on the banks of the Vodiana river, a tributary of the Samara.

== History ==
By the mid-19th century, the area of the modern town of the village of Novodonetske was part of the Stepanovskaya Volost (Sumy Uyezd, Kharkov Governorate), where iron ore, coal, and ochre deposits had already been explored by the 1880s. According to the "Explanatory Note to the Construction of the Rudnichno-Lozovskaya Railway," construction of a private railway in the general direction of Grishino (Donetsk Oblast)—Dubovoe (Donetsk Oblast) siding No. 14 Malinovka (Dubovo) was planned for 1901–1902, where a double crossing of the Vodyanaya Gully was planned near the modern village of Novodonetske.

In 1954, construction began on the D-1 and D-2 hydraulic mines, which were later combined into the Pioneer hydraulic mine (near the village of Samoylovka in the Oleksandrivka Raion), as well as No. 1 Krasnoarmeyskaya (now Novodonetskaya), near the village of Kuritsyno).

Novodonetske was founded in 1956 in connection with the construction of a mine. Four years later, the settlement was given the status of urban-type settlement. It was established as a workers' settlement in connection with the construction of the Pioneer mine (mine, Donetsk Coal Pioneer in the Dobropillia Raion. The first to be built were barrack-type buildings (demolished by 1996), the "Shakhtyor" club, a boarding school, a bookstore, and a bridge at the southern exit of the village—for access to the mine.

In 1959, a 50-bed hospital opened in the dormitory building—three doctors served the population instead of the 13 required by the staff. Around this time, household workshops of opened in the village: a sewing shop, a shoe shop, a watch shop, and a hairdresser. In 1959, the Aleksandrovsky District Council reviewed and approved an amended plan for the combined settlement of mines D-1, D-2, D-3, the hydromine, and the settlement The mine builders' project included measures to clean up the Samara River (a tributary of the Dnieper) and move the market square away from the Legendarnaya station, as a hospital campus was planned there.

In the early 1960s, when the first streets in the village were built, residents encountered the problem of poor work by contractors: Construction Departments No. 4 and No. 8, and Santekhelektromontazh (section No. 4) destroyed the landscaping completed in previous years during construction of their subdivisions. Many access roads and intra-block roads were polluted and littered, as contractors had poorly completed the water supply, sewerage, and heating systems, failing to complete the work they had begun. In some places, electrical cables were damaged.

In 1961, the village council developed regulations to improve the sanitary situation in the village. Construction and installation work that destroyed roads and sidewalks or damaged forests was permitted only with the consent of the village council. Specific parking spaces were allocated for work and construction vehicles; however, parking on the streets, near dormitories, and residential buildings was prohibited. Vehicles were prohibited from driving on sidewalks, as well as tracked vehicles on paved roads.

The cafeteria building of Canteen No. 9 of the Dobropillya Regional Station near the bus stop, where alcohol was sold and where brawls had occurred, was converted into a ticket office for the Novodonetsk Motor Column. Work was carried out to preserve a pond near the village: a spillway cofferdam was periodically It was reinforced to protect the reservoir during spring floods. In 1964, the road through the village and the station was paved.

In the 1960s, the Novodonetsk boarding school hosted an expeditionary group called "Into the Depths of the Centuries," which studied local history and, in particular, collected a wealth of material on the history of hydraulic mine construction. In the early 1970s, the village was transferred from the Oleksandrivka Raion to the Dobropolsky—due to the mine's ownership.

In the 1990s, the Pioneer mine managed to undergo reconstruction. After the collapse of the USSR, it turned out that the equipment for hydraulic coal mining was manufactured abroad. All this occurred against the backdrop of systematic disruptions in government funding for coal mining and huge wage and energy debts. In May 1995, the Cabinet of Ministers of Ukraine approved a decision to privatize the ATP-11482. In 1999, the Pioneer mine switched to the traditional "dry" method of coal mining. The new bench was equipped with a 3MKD90 complex.

Until 18 July 2020, Novodonetske was located in Dobropillia Municipality, The municipality was abolished on that day as part of the administrative reform of Ukraine, which reduced the number of raions of Donetsk Oblast to eight, of which only five were controlled by the government. Until 26 January 2024, Novodonetske was designated urban-type settlement. On this day, a new law entered into force which abolished this status, and Novodonetske became a rural settlement.

== Economy ==
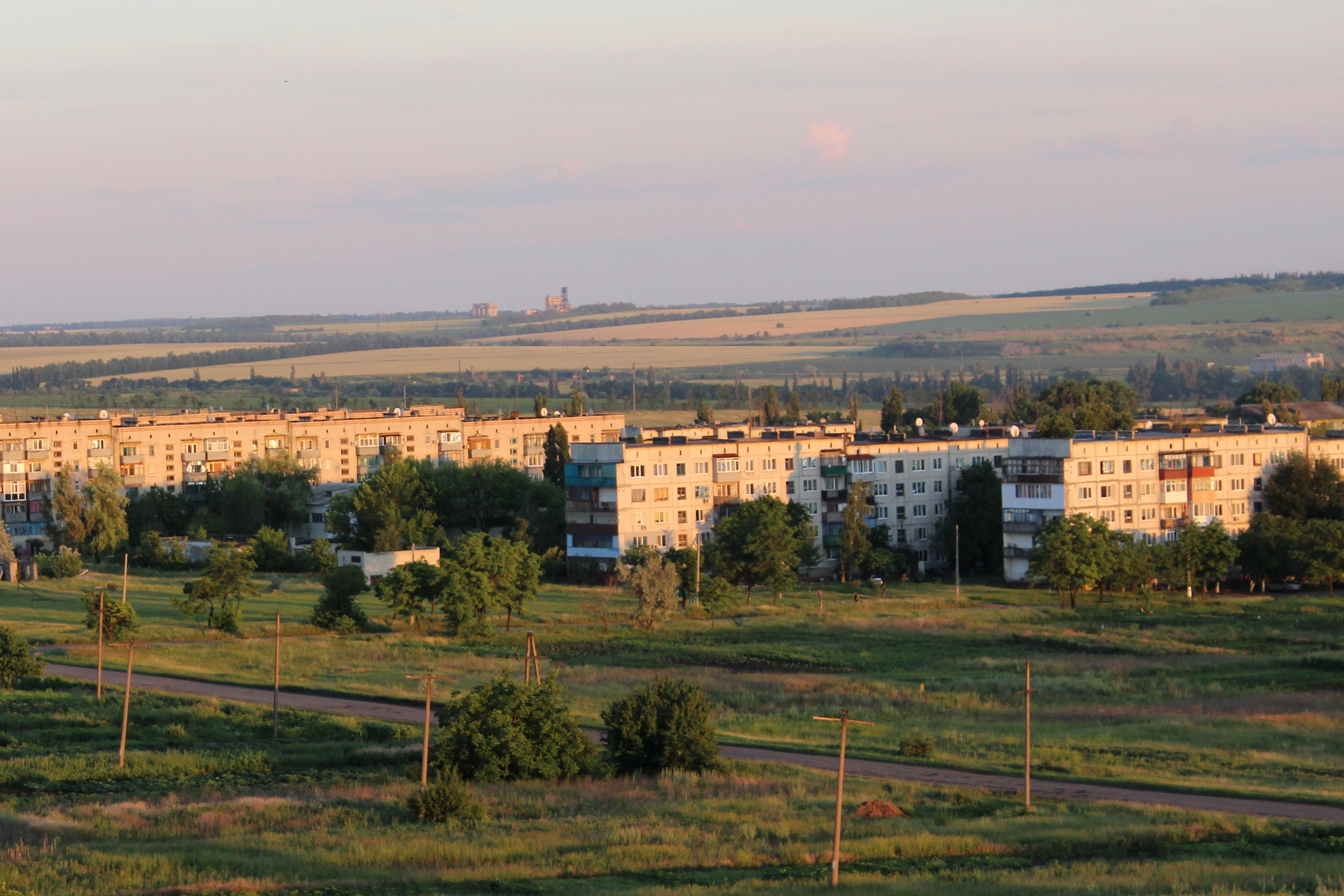
Prefabricated apartment buildings in Novodonetske.

At the Legendarnaya railway station (according to the Ministry of Defense of the Soviet Union project for the construction of the Dubovoye-Mertsalovo railway, the dividing point was called Stepanovka), there is the Legendarnaya elevator, handling facilities for long and bulk cargo, a technical inspection station, and an elevator designed to handle over 2,000 tons of grain per day (20–25 grain cars). The size of the hopper tanks is the largest in Ukraine and the third largest in Europe (150,000 tons).

Currently, the elevator operates at no more than a third of its design capacity, handling six grain cars and ten trucks per day. The bus station in Novodonetske is located near the southern exit from the village (Legendarnaya station is near the northern exit, from here it’s about 2 km walk through the village to the bus station), and it sends buses to Oleksandrivka, Lozova, Bilozerske, Dobropillia, Pokrovsk, Donetsk, Kramatorsk and Znamenovka.

== Demographics ==
Inhabitants

- 1989: 6,631
- 2013: 5,903
- 2019: 5775
- 2022: 5,597
- 2025: 4,250

Language

Native language as of the Ukrainian Census of 2001:

Language	Percentage
Ukrainian	54.84 %
Russian	44.80 %
Belarusian	0.11 %
Moldovan (Romanian)	0.06 %
Armenian, Romani and Romanian (self-declared)	0.02 %

== Notable people ==
- Ruslan Kisil (born 1991), Ukrainian footballer
