= Valery Gaina =

Russian-Romanian musician (born 1956)

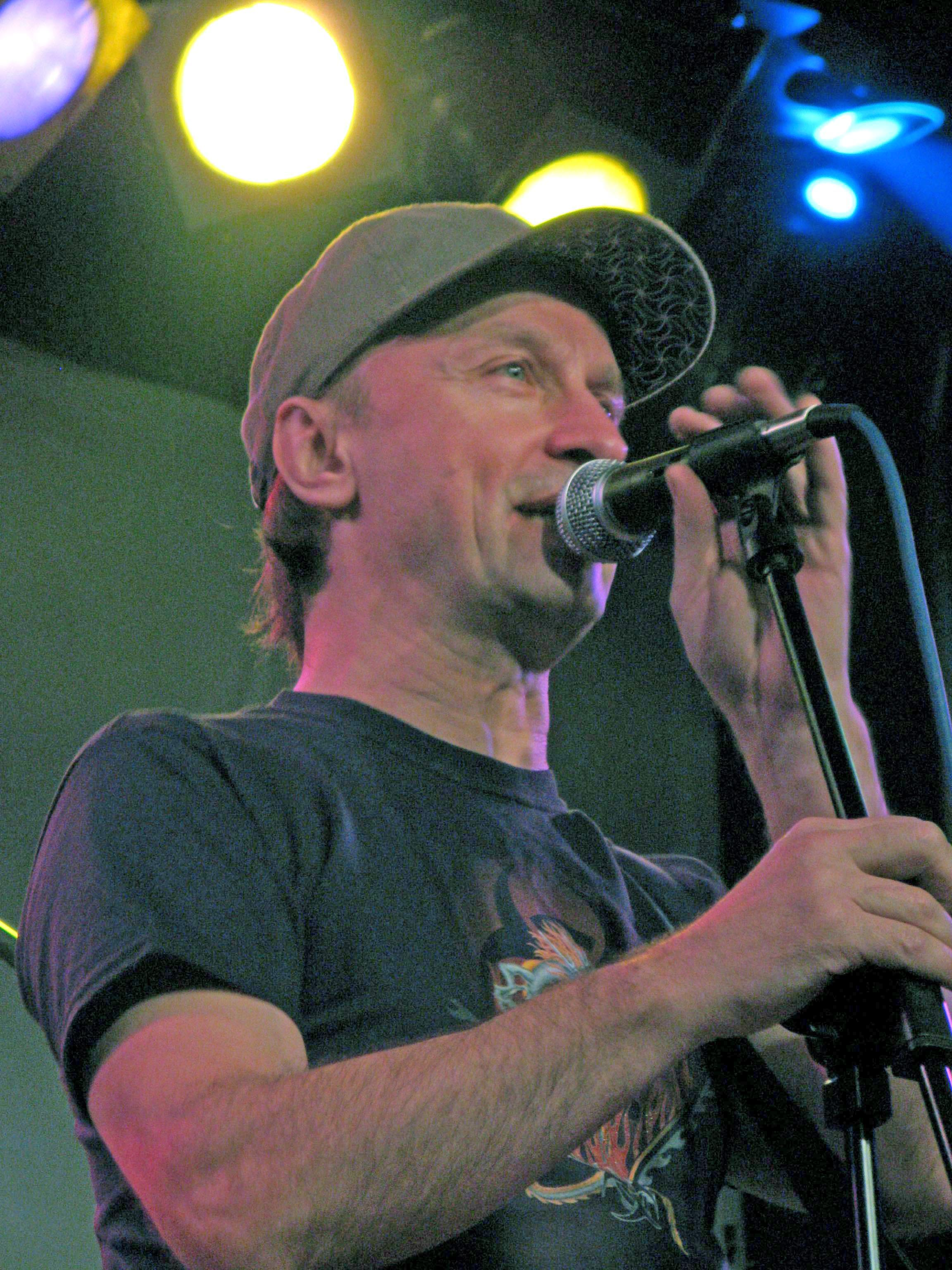
- Gaina in 2008

Background information
- Born: 25 June 1956 (age 69); Căzănești, Telenești District, Moldovan SSR, USSR
- Genres: Hard rock; heavy metal; speed metal; thrash metal
- Occupations: Singer; songwriter; musician; record producer
- Instruments: Guitar; vocals
- Labels: PolyGram; Warner; Melodiya; ZYX Music
- Member of: Cruise

Valery Borisovich Gaina (Russian: Валерий Борисович Гаи́на, [vɐˈɫɛrij bəˈrisəvit͡ɕ ɡɐˈinə], Romanian: Valeriu Găină,[vaˈleriu ɡəˈinə], also spelled Валериу Гэинэ in Moldovan Cyrillic, born 25 July 1956) is a Soviet-born American guitarist, songwriter, composer and singer of Moldovan (Romanian) origin. He is regarded as one of the best Soviet guitarists.

== Career ==
Valery Gaina was born on 25 July 1956 in Căzănești, Telenești District, Moldavian SSR, in the family of Boris Alexandru Gaina and Catherine Tudor-Gaina. He graduated from middle school in Telenesti, and then from the music school in Soroca. He sang in the bands Cordial (from Tiraspol), Magistrali (from Blagoveshchensk), Molodye golosa (from Tambov).

He gained recognition in 1981, when he presented performances of great audience in the biggest halls in Russia, within the hard-rock band Cruise, where he also asserted himself as a composer. In the years 1985–1989, some Union and Republican charts classified him as the best rock guitarist in the former U.S.S.R. He approached the genres of hard rock, thrash metal and heavy metal. In 1988 he moved to Munich, Germany, where he produced two records with the trio Cruise. In 1991, he emigrated to Los Angeles, where he continued to produce music.

After 15 years, he returned to Russia on tour in 2004. His last performance in Russia took place in 2016.

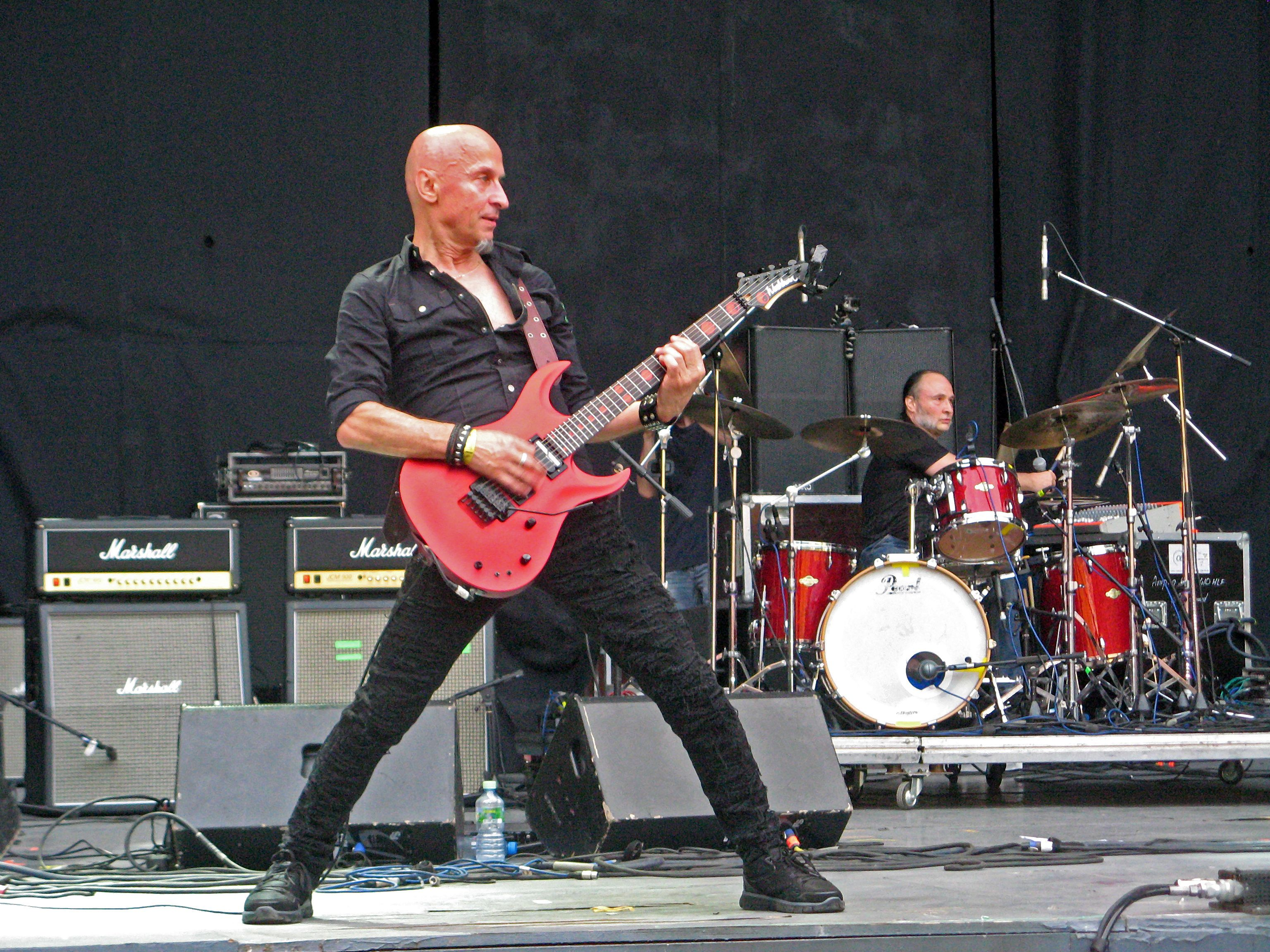
Gaina performing in Moscow in 2016

Gaina openly opposed the 2022 Russian invasion of Ukraine.
