= Oleksandrivka =

Oleksandrivka is one of the most popular names for populated places in Ukraine. There are over 100 localities in Ukraine named that way.

It may refer to the following places in Ukraine:

== Populated places ==
=== Urban settlements (towns) ===
- Oleksandrivka, Kramatorsk urban hromada, Kramatorsk Raion, Donetsk Oblast
- Oleksandrivka, Marinka Raion, Donetsk Oblast
- Oleksandrivka, Oleksandrivka Raion, Donetsk Oblast
- Oleksandrivka, Oleksandrivka settlement hromada, Kropyvnytskyi Raion, Kirovohrad Oblast
- Oleksandrivka, Oleksandrivka settlement hromada, Voznesensk Raion, Mykolaiv Oblast
- Oleksandrivka, Chornomorsk urban hromada, Odesa Raion, Odesa Oblast

=== Villages ===
There are 103 villages in Ukraine named Oleksandrivka.

- Oleksandrivka, Lyman urban hromada, Kramatorsk Raion, Donetsk Oblast, village in Donetsk Oblast
- Oleksandrivka, Kherson Raion, Kherson Oblast, village in Kherson Oblast
- Oleksandrivka, Khust Raion, village in Zakarpattia Oblast

=== Rural settlements (hamlets) ===
- Oleksandrivka, Zvenyhorodka Raion, a settlement in Cherkasy Oblast

== Transportation infrastructure ==
=== Border checkpoint ===
- Oleksandrivka (border checkpoint), Kharkiv Oblast
- Oleksandrivka (border checkpoint), Luhansk Oblast

=== Railway station ===
- Oleksandrivka railway station, in Oleksandrivka, Oleksandrivka settlement hromada, Voznesensk Raion, Mykolaiv Oblast

== See also ==
- Alexandrovka (disambiguation)
- Oleksandrivka Raion, various places
- Velyka Oleksandrivka, town in Kherson Oblast
