= Gedaklu =

Gedaklu may refer to:

- Gyodaklu (disambiguation), several towns in Armenia
- Mrgavan, Armenia
