= Vesela Hora, Donetsk Oblast =

Village in Donetsk Oblast, Ukraine

Vesela Hora Весела Гора
- Village
- Interactive map of Vesela Hora
- Location of Vesela Hora within Donetsk Oblast#Location of Vesela Hora within Ukraine Vesela Hora (Ukraine)
- Coordinates: 48°36′57″N 37°7′31″E
- Country: Ukraine
- Oblast (Province): Donetsk
- Raion (District): Kramatorsk Raion
- Hromada: Novodonetske settlement hromada
- Elevation: 163 m (535 ft)

Population (2001)
  - Total: 652
- Time zone: UTC+2 (EET)
  - Summer (DST): UTC+3 (EEST)
- Postal code: 84042
- Area code: +380 6269

Vesela Hora (Ukrainian: Весела Гора) is a village in the Kramatorsk Raion, Donetsk Oblast (province) of eastern Ukraine. It is part of Novodonetske settlement hromada, one of the hromadas of Ukraine.

Until 18 July 2020, Vesela Hora was located in Oleksandrivka Raion, The raion was abolished on that day as part of the administrative reform of Ukraine, which reduced the number of raions of Donetsk Oblast to eight, of which only five were controlled by the government.
