= Maxim Gorky (disambiguation) =

Maxim Gorky was a Russian writer.

Maxim Gorky, Maxim Gorkiy or Maksim Gorkiy may also refer to:

- Soviet cruiser Maxim Gorky, a Kirov-class cruiser
- SS Maxim Gorkiy, a cruise ship formerly operated by Phoenix Reisen
- Tupolev ANT-20 or Maxim Gorky, a propaganda aircraft
- Maksim Gorkiy, Armenia or Bovadzor, a town in the Lori Province of Armenia
- Maxim Gorky Fortresses, coastal batteries used by the Soviet Union in the Crimea during World War II
- Maksim Gorkiy station, a station on the Chilonzor Line of the Tashkent Metro.
