= Tigheci River =

Location
- Country: Moldova

Physical characteristics
- Mouth
  - location: Prut at Băiuş
  - coordinates: 46°15′6″N 28°8′49″E
- Length: 43 km (27 mi)

Basin features
- Progression: Prut→ Danube→ Black Sea

Tigheci River is a tributary of the Prut river in Moldova. It flows near the village of Băiuş, and pours near the village of Stoianovca. The meadow flora is represented by 100 plant species of 27 families and 74 genres.
