= Gyodaklu =

Gyodaklu or Gyodak’lu or Gedaklyu may refer to:

- Nerkin Gyodaklu, Armenia
- Verin Gyodaklu, Armenia
- Gödəkli, Azerbaijan
