= Gloria Gorceag =

Moldovan singer-songwriter

- Born: 21 November 1987 (age 38); Soroca, Moldavian SSR, Soviet Union
- Genres: Pop; folk
- Occupation(s): Musician, singer, songwriter, television presenter
- Instrument: Vocals
- Years active: 2008–present

Gloria Gorceag (born 21 November 1987) is a Moldovan singer, songwriter, and television presenter. She became famous in the Republic of Moldova in 2008 after she participated on the talent show Fabrica de staruri where she was a finalist.

== Early life ==
Gorceag was born on 21 November 1987 in Soroca, Moldova. From an early age, Gorceag loved music; her family members listened to lots of international music, and she grew to become influenced by MTV. In school, she sang both in choirs and as a soloist; she additionally participated in festivals and competitions.

Gorceag graduated from a Romanian-German high school. In 2007, she began her studies in town and country planning at Universitatea Tehnică din Republica Moldova faculty of town and country planning, but she quickly realized it wasn't a profession for her. Afterward, she transferred to Universitatea Perspectiva to learn interior design. She spent a year and a half there before dropping out. In 2009, she began her studies in journalism and communication sciences at Moldova State University.

== Career ==
In 2007—2008, Gorceag hosted a television show called Alege melodia. In 2008, she became a contestant on the talent show Fabrica de staruri and ended up a finalist.

In 2015–2017, Gorceag presented for the Eurovision Song Contest. Since 2018, she has been the host of her own talk show, Istoriile Gloriei. In 2019, she released a single, "Tudore," featuring Lia Taburcean, which received over 10 million views on YouTube.

== Discography ==
=== Singles ===
- "You Should Know"
- "Ce-Ai Face Tu" (featuring Irina Kit)
- "Soarele Și Luna (cântec de leagăn)"
- "Muzica"
- "Tudore" (featuring Lia Taburcean)
- "Când sunt cu tine (Paranormal)" (featuring Smally)
- "Iubire Defectă"
- "Fetiță Mândră"
- "Lada Fermecată"
- "Când Noaptea Vine"
- Hai Trompeta
- În Brațele Tale
