= Oleksandrivka Raion =

Oleksandrivka Raion may refer to a former raion of Ukraine:

- Oleksandrivka Raion, Donetsk Oblast, former raion in Donetsk Oblast
- Oleksandrivka Raion, Kirovohrad Oblast, former raion in Kirovohrad Oblast

== See also ==
- Oleksandrivka
- Velyka Oleksandrivka Raion, former raion in Kherson Oblast
