= Alexandrovca =

Alexandrovca may refer to several places in Moldova:

- Alexandrovca, a village in Plopi Commune, Cantemir district
- Alexandrovca, a village in Trifăneşti Commune, Floreşti district
- Alexandrovca, a village in Gangura Commune, Ialoveni district
- Alexandrovca, a village in Crasnîi Octeabri Commune, Transnistria
- Alexandrovca Nouă, a village in Crasnîi Vinogradari Commune, Transnistria
