= Telenești =

Town in Telenești District, Moldova

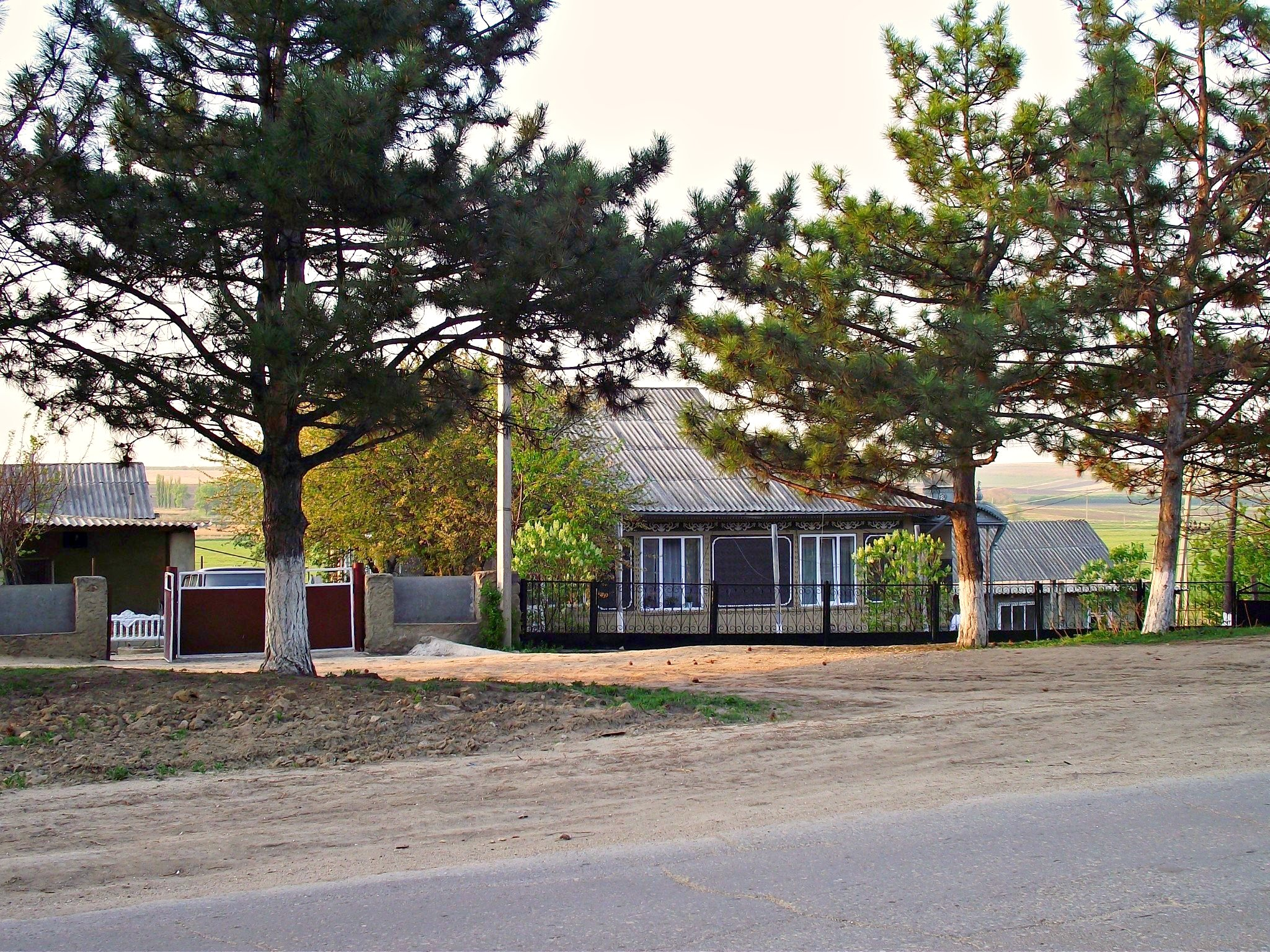

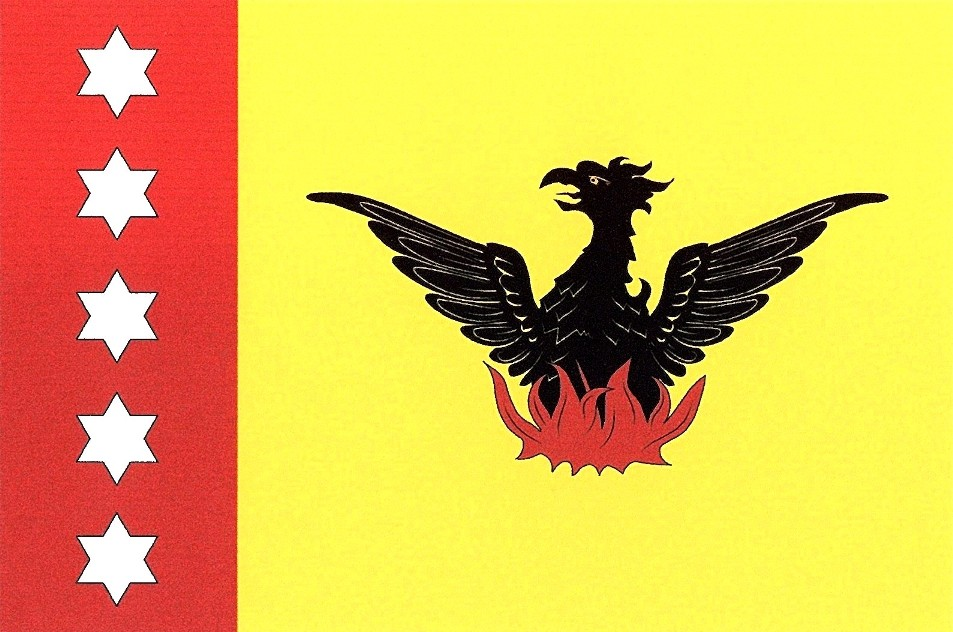
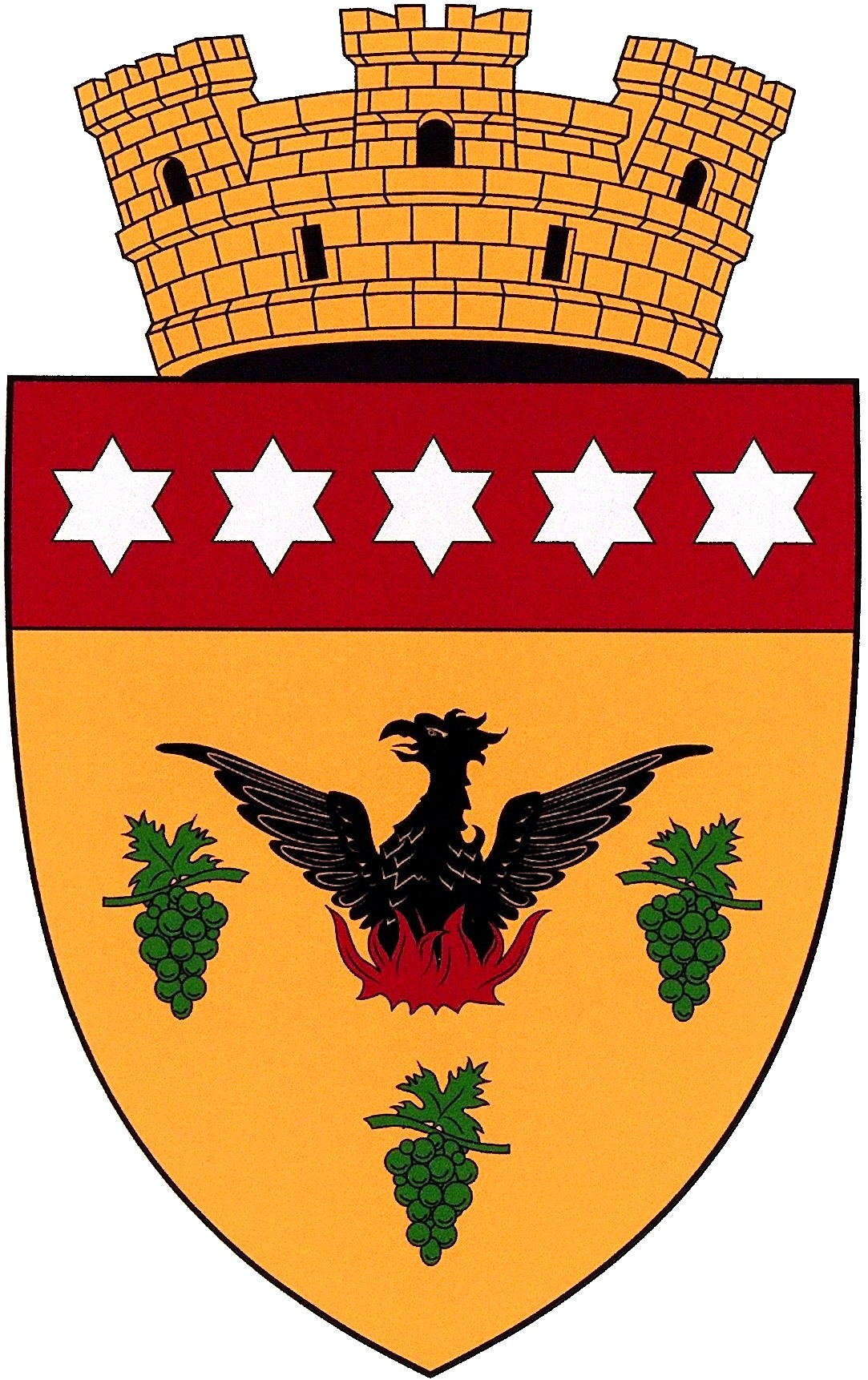
- Flag Seal

- Location within Moldova
- Coordinates: 47°30′10″N 28°22′0″E
- Country: Moldova
- Raion (district): Telenești

Area
  - Total: 536 km^{2} (207 sq mi)
- Elevation: 96 m (315 ft)

Population (2014)
  - Total: 7,227
  - Density: 13.5/km^{2} (34.9/sq mi)
- Time zone: UTC+2 (EET)
  - Summer (DST): UTC+3 (EEST)

Telenești (Romanian pronunciation: [teleˈneʃtʲ]) is a city in Moldova, located 91 kilometres to the north of the capital city, Chișinău. Telenești is the administrative center of the eponymous district. Three villages are administered by the city: Mihălașa, Mihălașa Nouă and Izvoraș. As of 2004, it had a population of 6,855, 89 percent of whom were Moldovan.

== Media ==
- Jurnal FM – 88.2 MHz

== Notable people ==
- Angel Agache, Moldovan politician.
- Nicoleta Dara, singer
- Nachum Gutman (1898–1980), Teleneşti-born Israeli painter, sculptor, and author

== Religion ==
Before World War II, the town had an important Jewish population. The Cathedral of St. Elijah from Telenești is one of the newest representative architectural monument. Țurcan Vasile is the priest of the St. Elijah Cathedral. The construction of Cathedral started in 2006.
