= Ordășei =

- Village
- Location within Moldova
- Coordinates: 47.6830555556°N 28.4958333333°E
- Country: Moldova
- District: Telenești District

Government
  - Mayor: Andrei Moldovanu (PL)

Population (2014 census)
  - Total: 783
- Time zone: UTC+2 (EET)
  - Summer (DST): UTC+3 (EEST)

Ordășei is a village in Telenești District, Moldova.
