= Cruise (band) =

Russian heavy metal band

Cruise Круиз
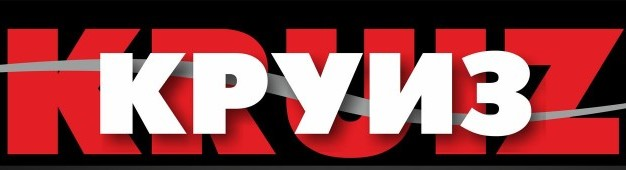

Background information
- Origin: Moscow
- Genres: Heavy metal Speed metal Hard rock
- Years active: 1980–1984, 1992–present, 1985–1990, 2016
- Labels: WEA Records
- Members: Gregory Bezougly; Vladimir Kapoustin; Oleg Kouzmitchyov; Nikolai Tschunosov and Valery Gaina; Fyodor Vasilyev; Sergey Efimov
- Past members: Alexander Monin (deceased); Serge Kirnitsky; Serge Sarychev; Seva Korolyuk; Alexander Kirnitsky; Matvey Anitchkin; Vsevolod Korolyuk; Gregory Bezougly; Oleg Kouzmitchyov; Vladimir Kapoustin; Nikolai Tscunusov; Vadim Malikov
- Website: kruizrock.ru

Cruise (Kruiz, Russian: Круиз) is a heavy metal band from the former Soviet Union. Started in 1980 as a government-controlled soft rock and pop act, the band enjoyed great success all across the USSR before the revocation of their license to perform/record in 1984 as part of the state's brief crackdown on the Western culture. In 1985, founding member and guitarist Valery Gaina reformed the band with a completely different line-up that featured him on lead vocals. This was followed by a major shift in the overall sound and image; from pop rock to heavy metal. In 1987, the band officially released their debut album "Kruiz-1" as a metal band, selling one million of legal copies. Outside Russia, they are best known for their video, In Flames, which was played many times in the mid-1980s, on the Canadian metal show, The Power Hour. Having released their debut English language album in 1988, Kruiz toured extensively in Russia, Europe, and North America before breaking up in 1990.

In 1992, all founding members, excluding Gaina, reformed a non-metal version of the band. Gaina, in turn, organized a one-off reunion of the band's metal line-up in 2016.

== History ==
Kruiz was formed in 1978, originally playing soft and hard rock songs with Russian lyrics. The original lineup consisted of Alexander Monin (vocals), Valery Gaina (guitars), Alexander Kirnitsky (1956–2008) (bass), Sergey Sarychev (keyboards), and Vsevolod Korolyuk (drums). In 1980, they released their first album called The Top, which was really a collection of demos. In 1981, they released their first official album, Крутится Волчoк (transcription: Krutitsya Volchok, translation: The Top Keeps Turning), featuring Alexander Kirnitsky on bass, and additional keyboards by Matvey Anitchkin. This was followed by another album Послушай Человек (Poslusshay Chelovek, translation: Listen, Man).

In 1983, the lineup changed to Monin (vocals), Gaina (guitars), Grigory Bezugly (guitars), Oleg Kuzmichov (bass), Vladimir Kapustin (keyboards), and Nikolai Tchunusov (drums). This lineup released the album Путешествие на Воздушном (Puteshestvye na Vozdushnom, translation: Balloon Journey). Shortly after the release of this album, the band, unfortunately, drew the ire of the Communist government and were ordered to disband. The band released one final album P.S. Продолжение Слeдует (P.S. Prodolzhenye Sleduet, translation: P.S. To be Continued) in 1983, before stopping all activities.

In 1985, Valery Gaina decided to reform the band and take a heavier approach to their music.

This lineup was short-lived and Valery Gaina soon recruited another lineup with himself on vocals and guitars, Fyodor Vasilyev (bass), and Sergey Efimov (drums). One song (Rock is Forever) was promptly banned by the authorities and hence, only appears on the demo.

The band went on a European Tour in 1989 and were featured on a German TV program, "Mosh Special", on 5 February 1989. Kruiz opened for bands such as Metallica and Slayer and were scheduled to release a third album, titled Culture Shock, but their contractual obligations prevented them from doing so. Sergey Efimov flew back to Russia. Gaina and Vasilyev attempted to finish the album using the services of Iain Finlay (then drummer for Running Wild), but could not complete the album. Shortly after this, the band broke up.

== Post breakup ==
Valery Gaina then formed the band Gain, with Vladimir Bajin (vocals), Alexander Shprot (bass), and Andrei Shatounovsky (session drummer). This band recorded an album in 1990 but it only came out in 1995, with two bonus tracks from the unreleased third Kruiz album Culture Shock. Valery Gaina then moved to Los Angeles, mainly because of the rise of the Russian Mafia. He formed a band called Karma and released an album (Fence) under the Frozen Hound label.

Drummer Sergey Efimov also moved to the United States and later played in bands called Wolves and Hippies of Chaos, where he also sang in the band. He also found work as a session musician.

== Reunion ==
In 1994, the original vocalist of Kruiz, Alexandre Monin, upon the success of V. Gaina, reformed the band, with the lineup consisting of himself, Gregory Bezougly (guitars), Vladimir Kapoustin (keyboards), Oleg Kouzmitchyov (bass), and Nikolai Tschunosov (drums). This lineup returned to their original style of soft and hard rock music and released three albums, Live at Robin Hood Festival in 1994, Всем встать (translation: Stand Up Everyone) in 1996 and Live Collection in 1998.

On 27 August 2010 Alexandre Monin died aged 56 of peritonitis.

Soon after Monin's death, the band announced a new lead singer in the name of Dmitry Avramenko from the band "Charisma".
