= Novodonetske settlement hromada =

Novodonetske settlement hromada Новодонецька міська громада
- Hromada
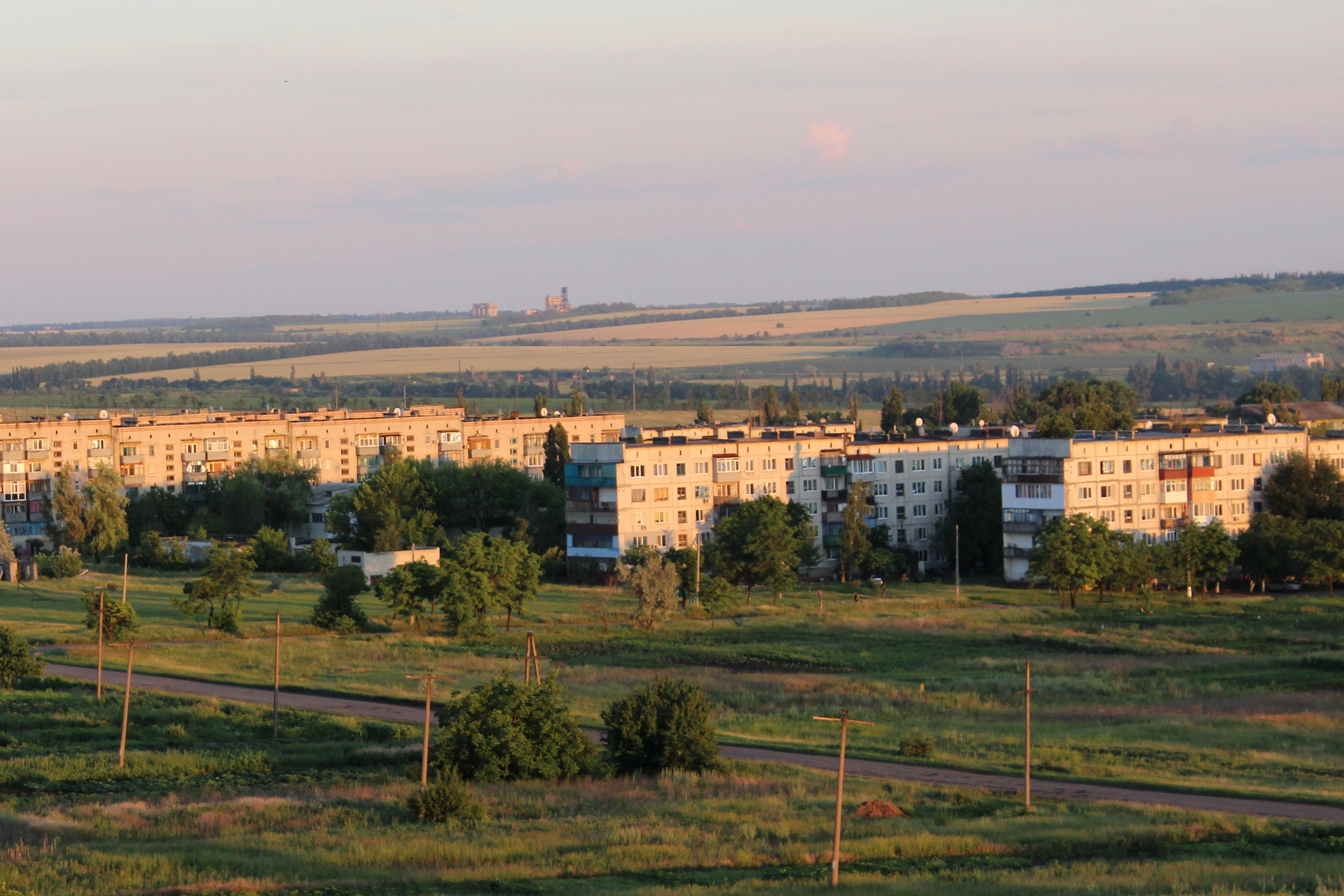
- Tower-height view of the hromada
- Interactive map of Novodonetske settlement hromada
- Country: Ukraine
- Oblast: Donetsk
- Raion: Kramatorsk

Area
  - Total: 280.0 km^{2} (108.1 sq mi)

Population (2020)
  - Total: 10,723
  - Density: 38.30/km^{2} (99.19/sq mi)
- Settlements: 20
- Rural settlements: 2
- Villages: 17
- Towns: 1

Novodonetske settlement hromada (Ukrainian: Новодонецька міська громада) is a hromada of Ukraine, located in Kramatorsk Raion, Donetsk Oblast. Its administrative center is the town of Novodonetske.

It has an area of 280.0 square kilometres (108.1 mi^{2}) and a population of 10,723, as of 2020.

The hromada contains 20 settlements: 1 town (Novodonetske), 17 villages:

- Vesela Hora
- Iverske
- Katerynivka
- Krynytsy
- Kuritsine
- Kuroidivka
- Novoiverske
- Novopavlivka
- Novopetrivka
- Novosamarske
- Novoserhiivka
- Samiilivka
- Spasko-Mykhailivka
- Stepanivka
- Fedorivka
- Shevchenko
- Shostakivka

And 2 rural-type settlements: Novoyavlenka and Samarske.

== See also ==
- List of hromadas of Ukraine
