= Bănești, Telenești =

Bănești
- Commune
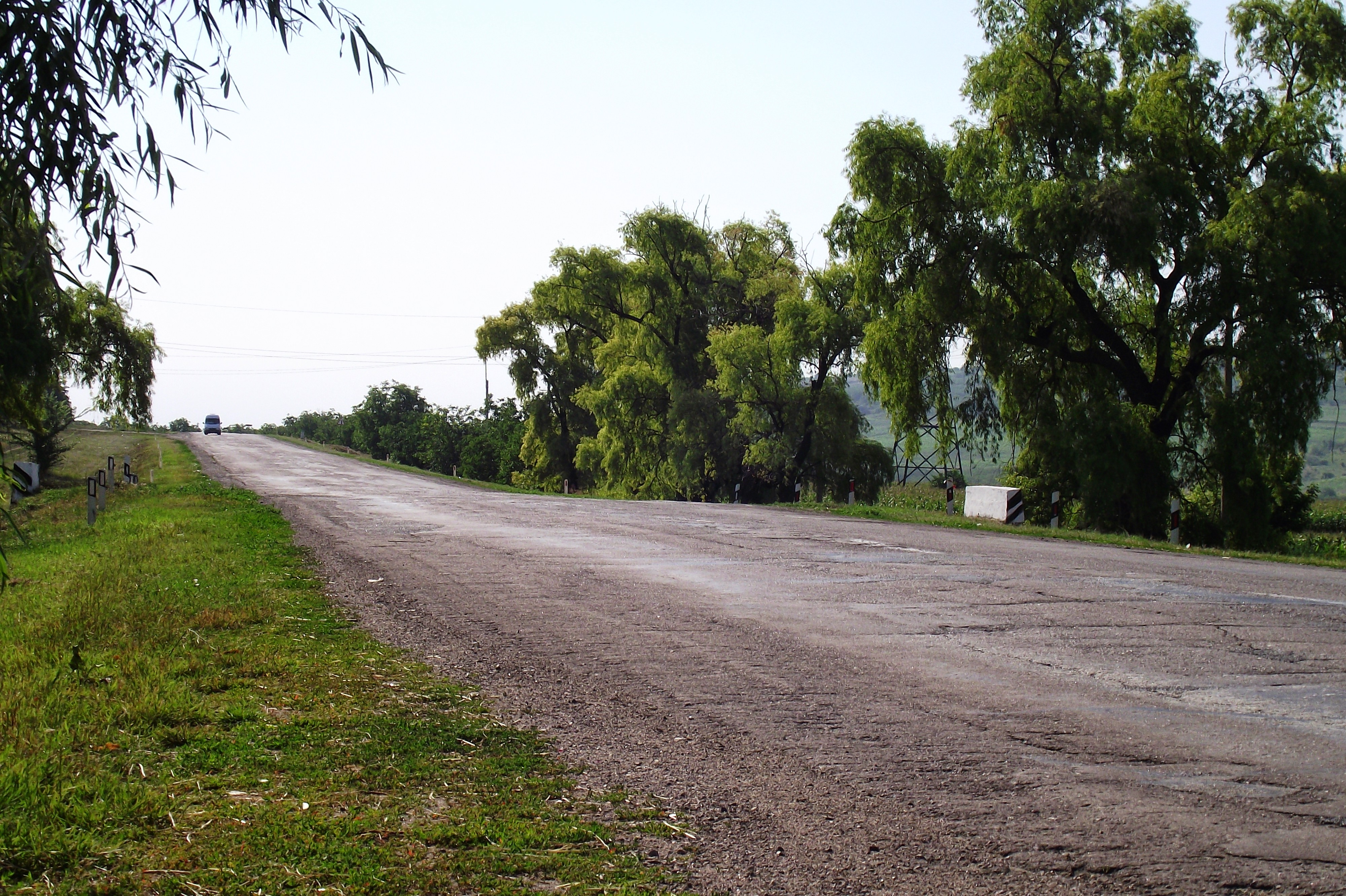
- Bănești, Moldova

- Location within Moldova
- Coordinates: 47.5688888889°N 28.3808333333°E
- Country: Moldova
- District: Telenești District

Government
  - Mayor: Popovici Vasile (since 1994) (candidat independent)

Population (2014)
  - Total: 3,109
- Time zone: UTC+2 (EET)
  - Summer (DST): UTC+3 (EEST)

Bănești is a commune in Telenești District, Moldova. It is composed of two villages, Bănești and Băneștii Noi, totalling 1250 households.
