= Verejeni =

- Commune and village
- Location in Moldova
- Coordinates: 47°32′N 28°28′E
- Country: Moldova
- District: Telenești District

Population (2014 census)
  - Total: 2,802
- Time zone: UTC+2 (EET)
  - Summer (DST): UTC+3 (EEST)

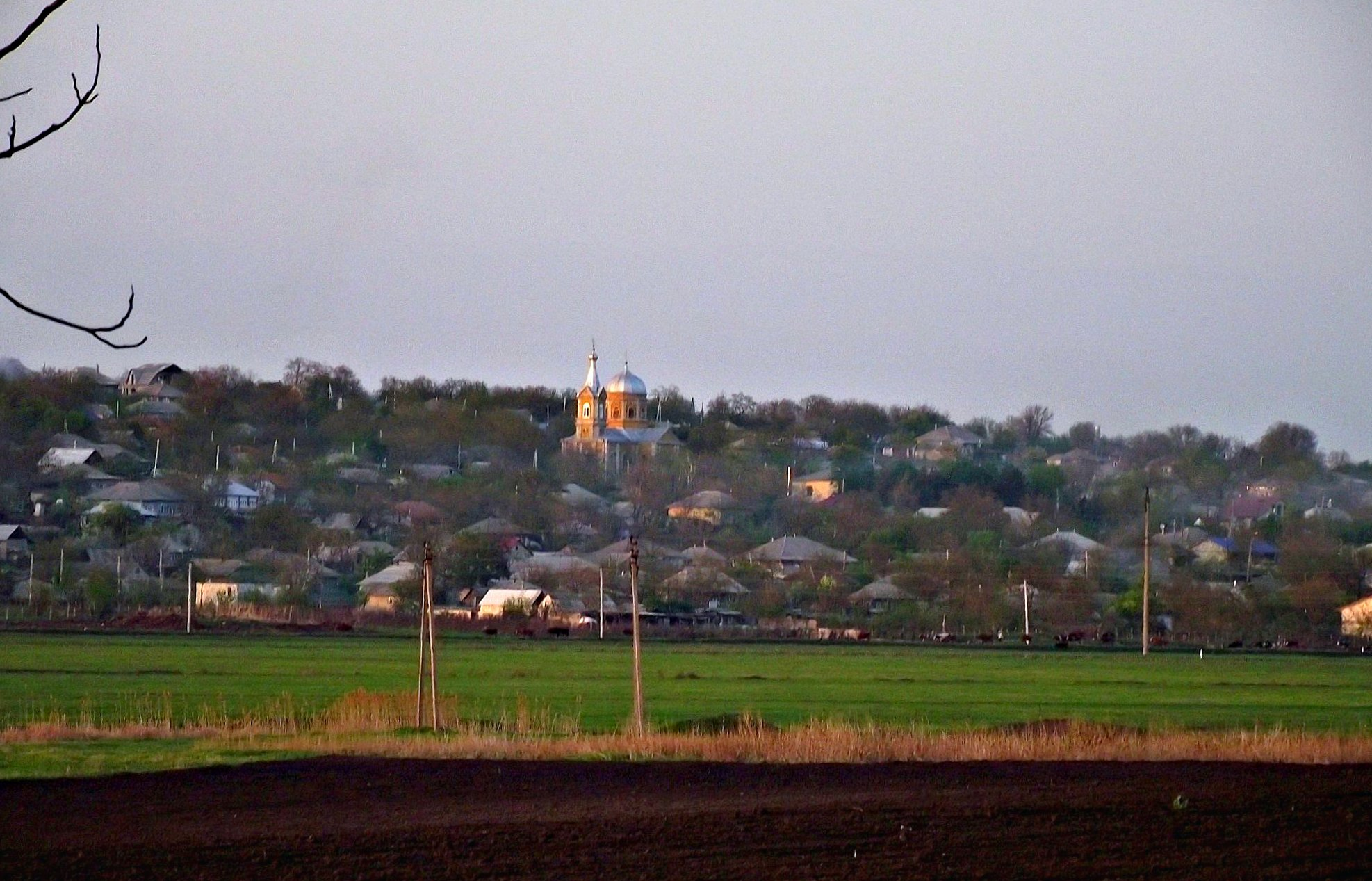
Telenești District, Moldova

Verejeni is a village in Telenești District, Moldova.

== General information ==
Village Name: Verejeni

Date Founded: 1628

Geographic Position: 47°32′N.; 28°27′E., 9 km from the district center of Telenești and 80 km from Chișinãu;

Total Area: 3289,9 ha;

Roads: 24 km;

Number of Inhabitants: 3028 residents:

- Men: 1500;
- Women: 1528;
- Young People: 946;
- Retired: 413;
- Children: 589;

Population Density: 98 residents/km2;

Number of Households: 1130

Mayor: Bîrcă Ștefan

== Local institutions ==
Verejeni offers the following social, cultural, and economic services:

- General school for grades 1-10 (max capacity 320 students), subject to The Telenești district's Department of Education
- Kindergarten (max. capacity: 120 students), also subject to The Telenești Department of Education
- "Culture House" (max seating: 220), subject to The Telenești Department of Cultural Services
- Adults' Public Library, subject to The Telenești Department of Cultural Services
- Children's Public Library, subject to The Telenești Department of Cultural Services
- Medical Center, subject to The Telenești Department of Family Medicine
- Internet Center "Enter"
- ACSA, Agro-information extension branch
- Center for Economic Planning

== Village's legend ==
They say that long ago Verejeni was a thriving forest. An old woman named Vera, being a great healer, settled here because of the local herbs which could heal wounds and cure diseases. One day, an injured hunter passed through the woods. Vera, with her gift for healing, treated him and sent him on his way. News of her ability spread throughout Orhei and people flocked to her hut to be under her care. Her fame continued to spread and even people from the Bugeac plains made their way to the famous healer. They arrived after a heavy storm, and upon reaching her hut they sensed trouble. Soon after, they discovered Vera's lifeless body. They buried Vera in the ground as their religion dictated. Vera had left the world many potions and remedies in her little hut. And having discovered these medicines, the people from Bugeac decided to settle in Vera's land. The land was rich and dark and bound by two great rivers. They named their settlement Verena, later known as Verejeni, in honor of this miraculous healer.

== From a legend to history ==
Historical sources first mention Verejeni in the years 1627–1628 in reference to land granted to Istrățel of Verejeni as witnessed by Larie of Verejeni and Miron of Saăhaicani.

According to the population census from the years 1772-1774 Verejeni consisted of 29 households with 49 inhabitants. By 1870 the village grew to 248 households and with 793 inhabitants, of whom were 294 men and 399 women. Records indicate that at the time Verejeni was a freeholder's village. The first mention of the village church dates back to 1801, which was then made of wood. Construction of current stone church dates back to 1901 and was blessed under St. George, protector of the weak. From 1886 the church is mentioned as a teaching institution.

As voiced above, Verejeni's name comes from the legend of the great healer Vera. Initially the village was called Verena, and later changed its name to Verejeni.

Verejeni is located in the plains of central Moldova, in the river basin of the Big Ciucul and Little Ciucul rivers. The village center lies approximately one kilometer from the Chișinău-Bălți highway, and also one kilometer from the Telenești-Ratuș-Orhei road. Verejeni is located approximately eight kilometers awaz from the district center of Telenești, 35 kilometers from the city of Orhei, 55 kilometers from the city Bălți, and 80 kilometers from the capital Chișinău. The village is bordered by Bănești to the north, Inești to the west, Ratuș to the east, and Leușeni from the south.

== Notable people ==
- Lidia Guțu
- Lia Taburcean
