= Lia Taburcean =

Moldovan singer-songwriter (born 1997)

- Born: 24 July 1997 (age 28); Verejeni, Telenești District, Moldova
- Genres: Pop; folk
- Occupations: Singer, songwriter
- Instrument: Vocals
- Years active: 2016–present

Lia Taburcean (born 24 July 1997) is a Moldovan singer and songwriter.

== Biography ==
Taburcean was born on 24 July 1997 in the village of Verejeni, in Telenești District, Moldova. She was adopted at the age of six months, which she publicly announced in 2018 on the Moldovan television show Istoriile Gloriei. In fact, Taburcean had stated that her adoptive parents would have liked to adopt another child.

Taburcean began her musical career in 2016 with the release of the song "La nunta asta" (At this wedding), which quickly became a hit in the Republic of Moldova and has since become widely popular at Moldovan weddings. Following her breakthrough, Taburcean released other successful songs combining pop and traditional Moldovan and Romanian musical elements such as "Ca-n Filme Indienne" and "Când Eu Iubesc" amongst others. In 2018, Taburcean was engaged and pregnant, but suffered a miscarriage, after which the relationship ended. In 2020, the singer married, and in 2022, she gave birth to a son.

== Discography ==
=== Studio albums ===
- 2017: La Nunta Asta
- 2019: Tudore
- 2024: Seara asta

=== Singles and EPs ===
- 2016: Ca-n Filme Indiene
- 2017: Achtung, Achtung! (feat. Kapushon)
- 2017: Mânză
- 2017: La Nunta Asta
- 2018: Cuscră
- 2020: Undeva la București
