= Milcoiu =

- Commune
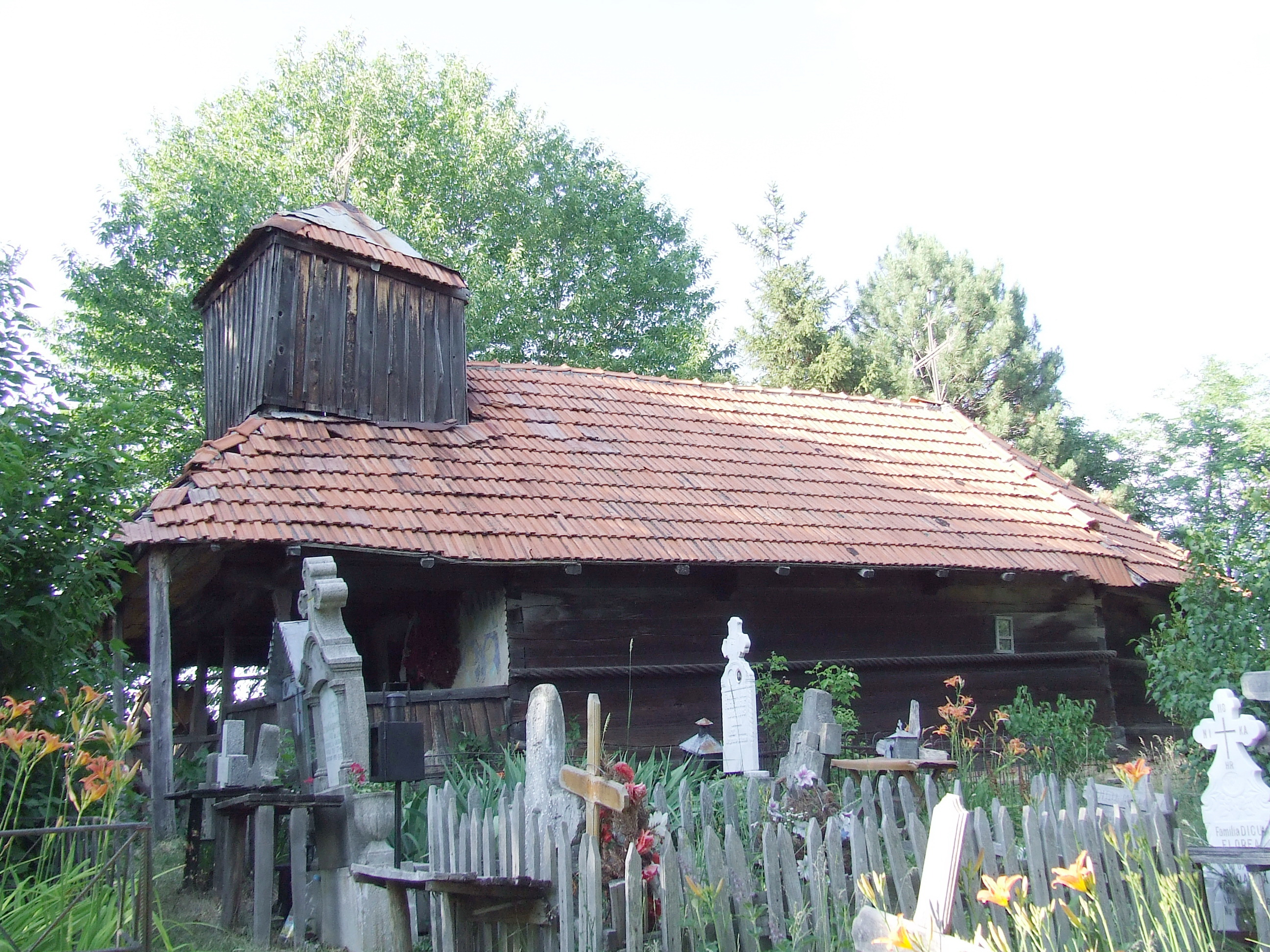
- Wooden church in Izbășești

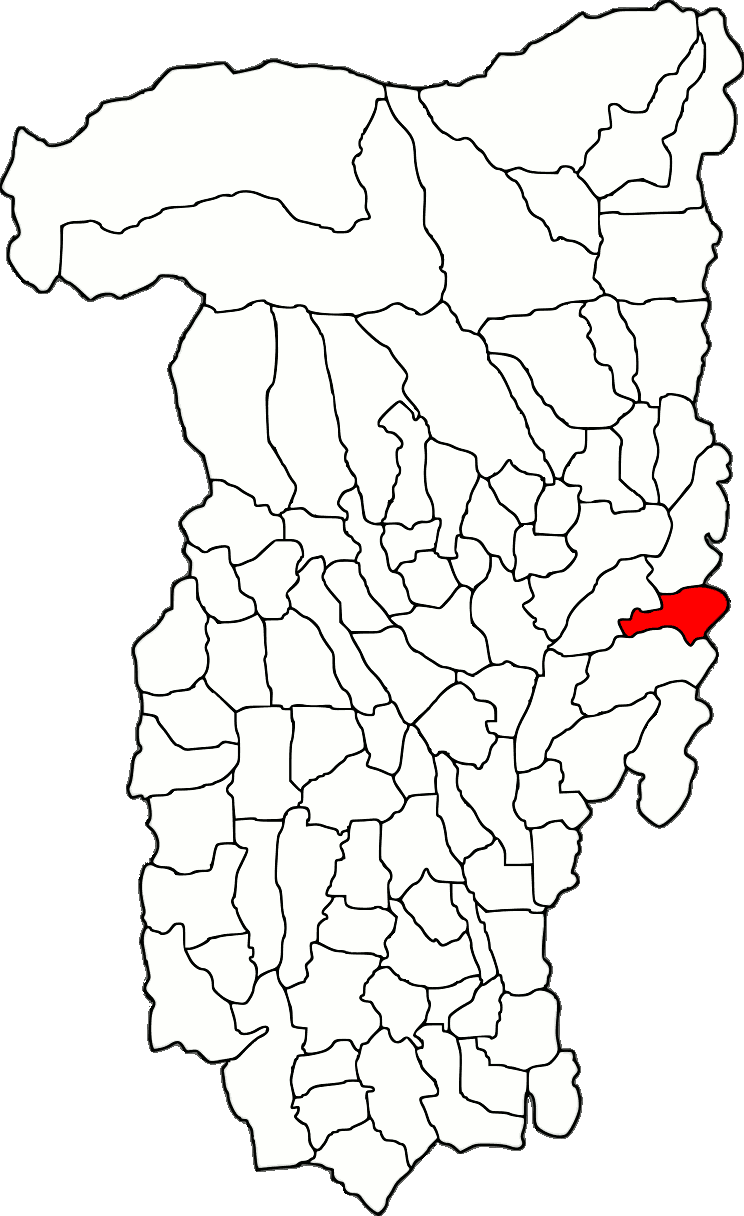
- Location in Vâlcea County

- Location in Romania
- Coordinates: 45°3′N 24°28′E
- Country: Romania
- County: Vâlcea

Government
  - Mayor (2020–2024): Gheorghe-Daniel Mușat (PNL)
- Area: 30.57 km^{2} (11.80 sq mi)
- Elevation: 354 m (1,161 ft)
- Population (2021-12-01): 1,083
  - Density: 35.43/km^{2} (91.76/sq mi)
- Time zone: UTC+02:00 (EET)
  - Summer (DST): UTC+03:00 (EEST)
- Postal code: 247395
- Area code: +(40) 250
- Vehicle reg.: VL
- Website: milcoiu.ro

Milcoiu is a commune located in Vâlcea County, Muntenia, Romania. It is composed of six villages: Căzănești, Ciutești, Izbășești, Milcoiu, Șuricaru, and Tepșenari.
