= Pistruieni =

- Commune
- Location within Moldova
- Coordinates: 47.6919444444°N 28.4880555556°E
- Country: Moldova
- District: Telenești District

Population (2014)
  - Total: 994
- Time zone: UTC+2 (EET)
  - Summer (DST): UTC+3 (EEST)

Pistruieni is a commune in Teleneşti District, Moldova. It is composed of three villages: Hîrtop, Pistruieni and Pistruienii Noi.
