= Bargushat =

Bargushat Բարգուշատ
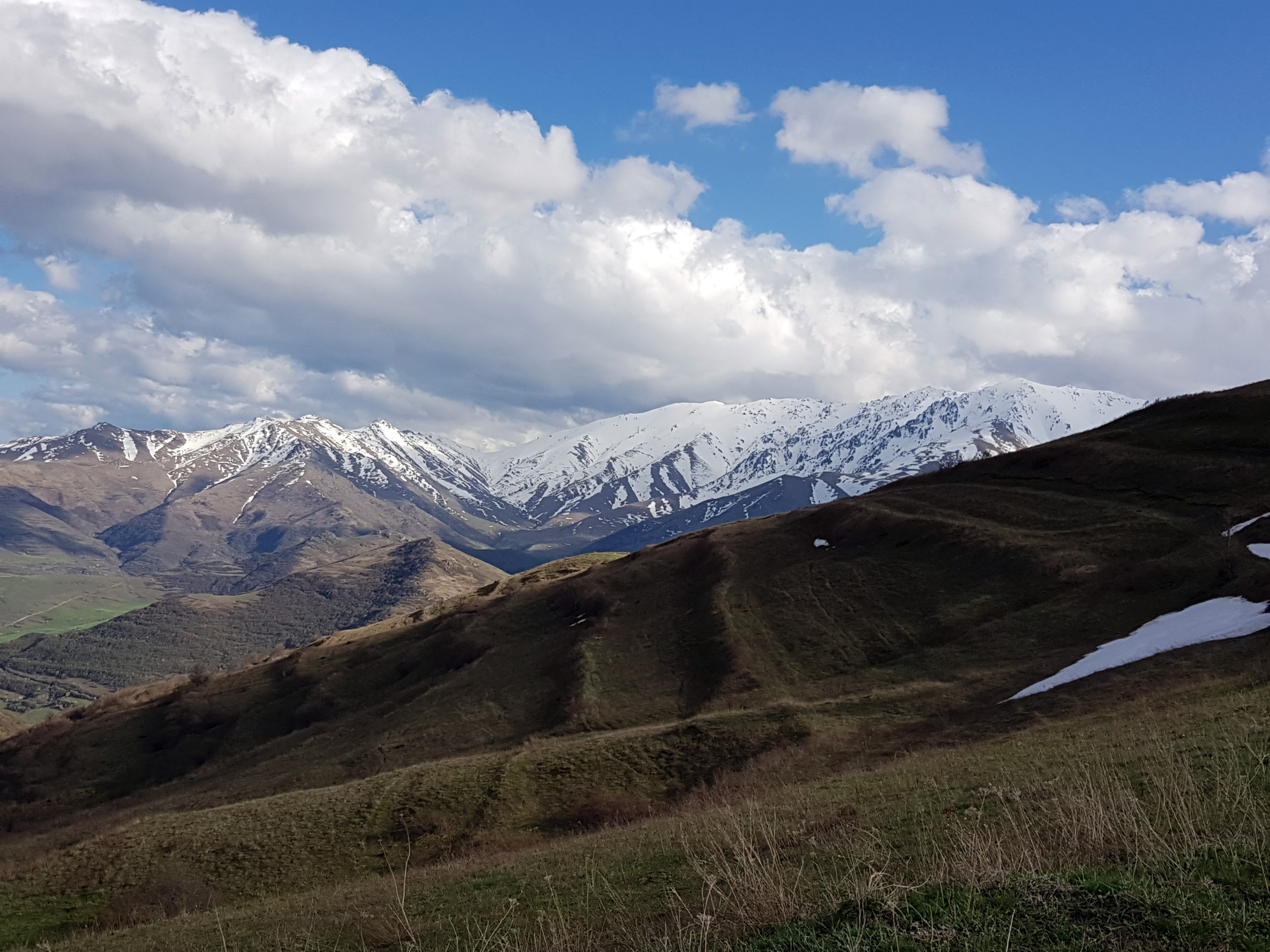

- Location within Armenia Location within Syunik Province
- Coordinates: 39°13′21″N 46°27′58″E
- Country: Armenia
- Province: Syunik
- Municipality: Kapan

Population (2011)
  - Total: 98
- Time zone: UTC+4 (AMT)

Bargushat (Armenian: Բարգուշատ) is a village in the Kapan Municipality of the Syunik Province in Armenia.
