= Chkalovka =

Village in Gegharkunik, Armenia

Chkalovka Չկալովկա
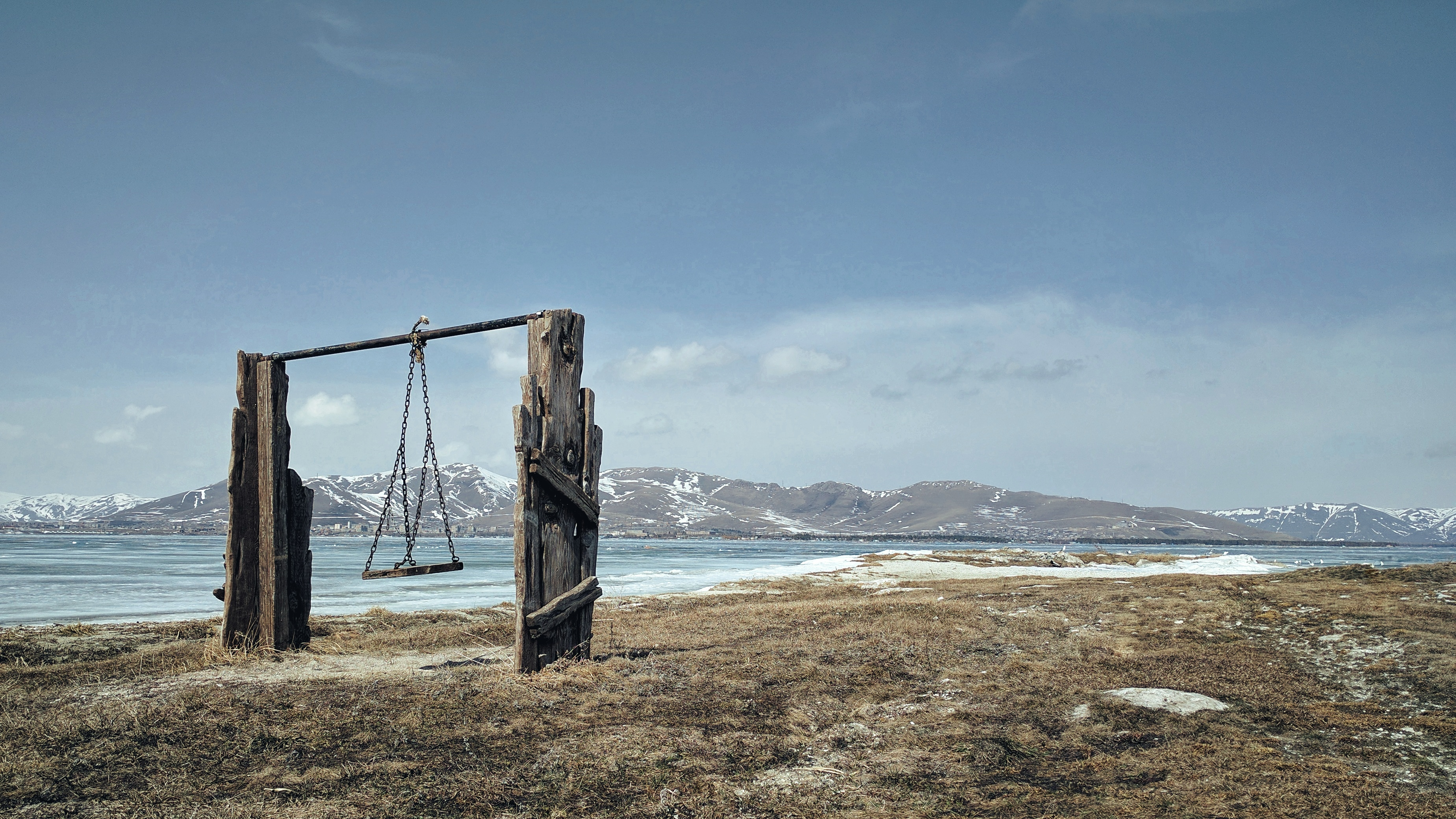
- Scenery around Chkalovka

- Location within Armenia Location within Gegharkunik
- Coordinates: 40°30′30″N 44°58′44″E
- Country: Armenia
- Province: Gegharkunik
- Municipality: Sevan
- Founded: 1840
- Elevation: 1,931 m (6,335 ft)

Population (2011)
  - Total: 516
- Time zone: UTC+4 (AMT)
- Postal code: 1514

Chkalovka (Armenian: Չկալովկա) is a village in the Sevan Municipality of the Gegharkunik Province of Armenia.

== Etymology ==
The village was known as Aleksandrovka and Zeynalagali until 1946.

== History ==
The village was founded by Russians who emigrated from the Volga, Saratov and Tambov regions of the Russian Empire in the first half of the 19th century. On April 26, 1946, it was renamed in honour of test pilot Valeri Chkalov. Until 1926 it was inhabited by Russians. In 1831 it had 45 inhabitants, while in 1989 - 455 inhabitants.

== Gallery ==
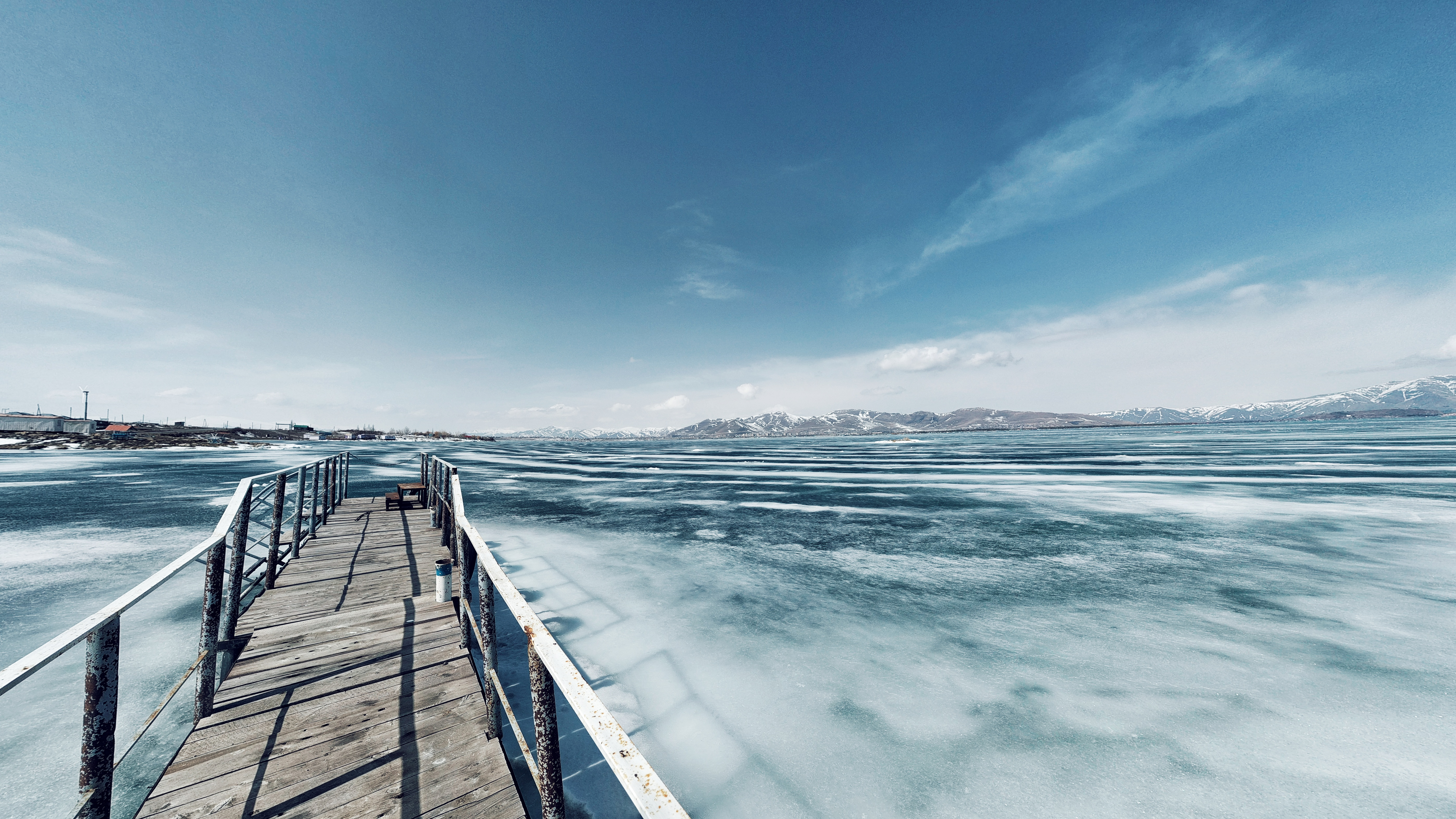
Lake Sevan near Chkalovka
