= Job Hartop =

English seaman and traveler

Job Hortop
- Born: Bourne, Lincolnshire
- Occupations: Seaman and traveler

Job Hartop, or Hortop, was an English adventurer who enlisted as chief gunner on John Hawkins' third voyage to the Caribbean. He became stranded and was captured by the Spanish authorities after the Battle of San Juan de Ulúa (1568) and used as a galley slave. A ship in which he was serving was subsequently captured, and he returned to England.

== Biography ==
Hortop describes himself as a powder-maker, born at Bourne, Lincolnshire, and from the age of twelve brought up as a powder-maker at Redriff, now called Rotherhithe. In 1567 he was entered on board the Jesus with Captain John Hawkyns as one of the gunner's crew, and served in her during the voyage which was rudely ended at San Juan de Lua. Hortop was one of those who escaped in the Minion and were afterwards landed to the north of the river Panuco. Thence he and his companions made their way to the city of Mexico, where he was detained two years. He was afterwards sent to Vera Cruz for a passage to Spain; had a narrow escape of being hanged on the way for an attempt to escape, and on arriving at San Lucar was consigned to a prison at Seville. He contrived to escape, in company with Barrett, who had been master of the Jesus, a man named Gilbert, and four others. They were caught and brought back; Barrett and Gilbert were sentenced to death and executed; Hortop was sent to the galleys for ten years, the others for shorter times. Hortop's ten years was extended to twelve, and he was then sent back to prison, from which he was taken to work ‘as a drudge’ in the house of ‘the treasurer of the king's mint.’ In October 1590, while at San Lucar, he stowed himself away on board a ship of Flanders, which was captured by the Galeon Dudley, and Hortop was thus brought to England. He landed at Plymouth on 2 December 1590, and returned to Rotherhithe. His own narrative, published in 1591 separately, and in 1598 by Hakluyt, which supplies all that is known of him, ends at this point. As he claims to repeat the exact words of conversations twenty-three years old, of which he had no memorandum, the details of his adventures cannot be considered altogether trustworthy.

== See also ==
- Master Gunner
