= Gharibjanyan =

Village in Shirak, Armenia

Gharibjanyan Ղարիբջանյան
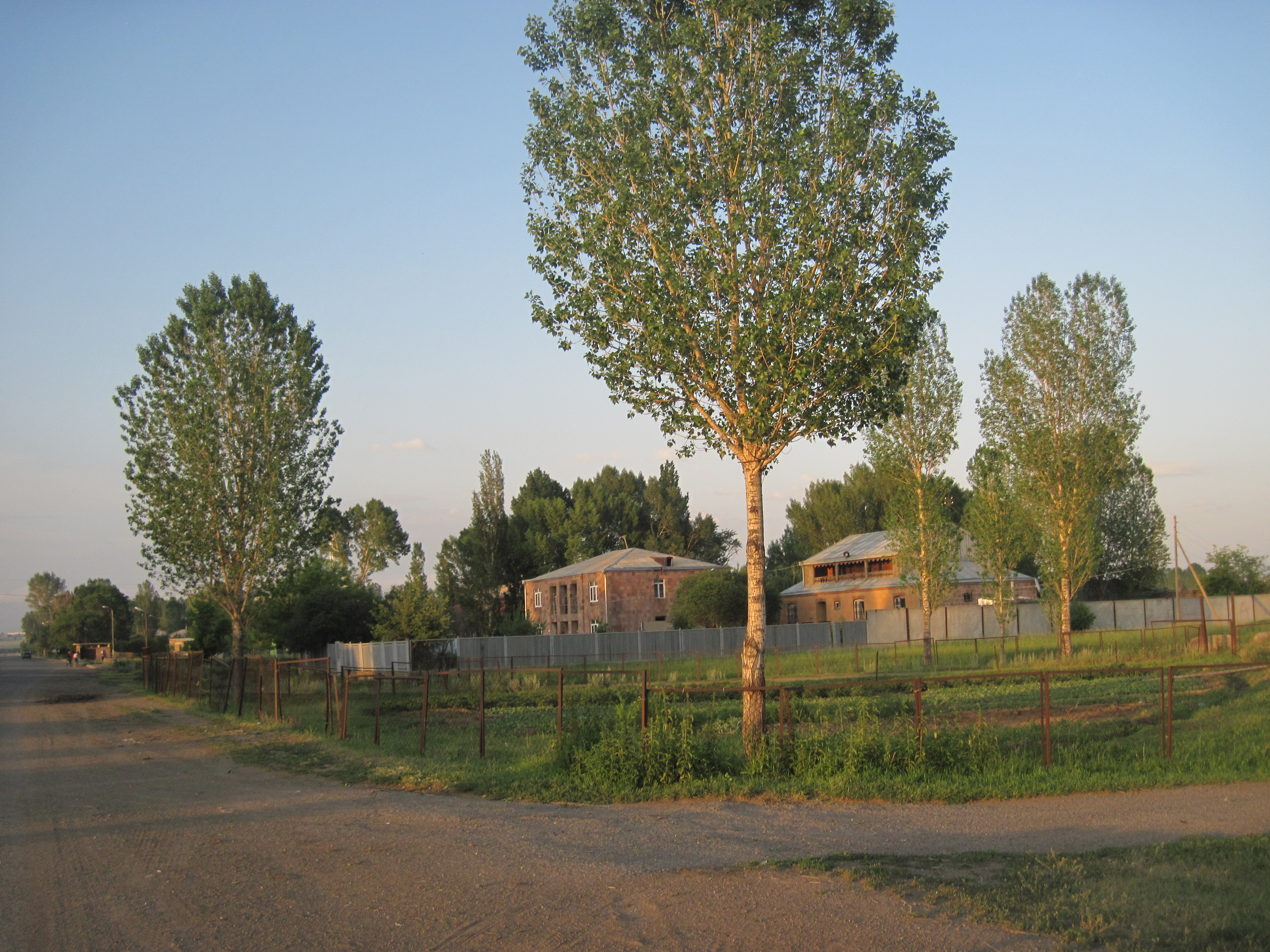

- Location within Armenia Location within Shirak
- Coordinates: 40°44′46″N 43°47′49″E
- Country: Armenia
- Province: Shirak
- Municipality: Akhuryan
- Elevation: 1,470 m (4,820 ft)

Population (2011)
  - Total: 1,055
- Time zone: UTC+4

Gharibjanyan (Armenian: Ղարիբջանյան), known as Aleksandrovka until 1935, is a village in the Akhuryan Municipality of the Shirak Province of Armenia. The village was renamed in 1935 in honor of Bolshevik leader Bagrat Gharibjanyan, killed in 1920.

== Demographics ==
The population of the village since 1908 is as follows:

Historical population
Year	Pop.	±% p.a.
1908	202	—
1926	345	+3.02%
1939	539	+3.49%
1959	667	+1.07%
1970	674	+0.09%
1979	595	−1.38%
1989	954	+4.83%
2001	953	−0.01%
2011	1,055	+1.02%
