= Ghindești, Florești =

Ghindești
- Commune
- Location within Moldova
- Coordinates: 47.8558333333°N 28.3788888889°E
- Country: Moldova
- District: Florești District

Population (2014)
  - Total: 2,172
- Time zone: UTC+2 (EET)
  - Summer (DST): UTC+3 (EEST)

Ghindești is a commune in Florești District, Moldova. It is composed of four villages: Ghindești, Hîrtop, Țîra and Țîra station.
