= Bovadzor =

Bovadzor Բովաձոր
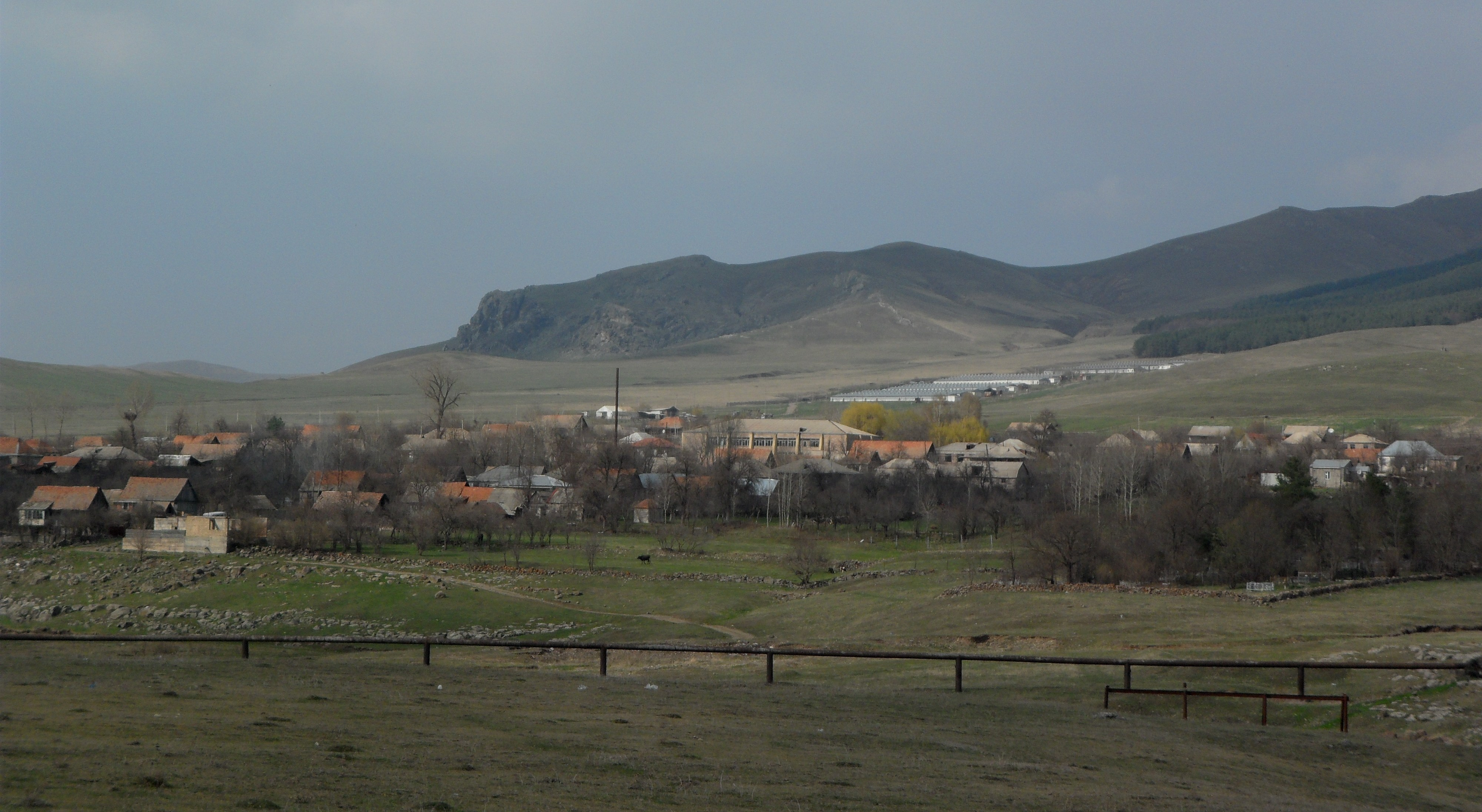

- Location within Armenia
- Coordinates: 41°02′12″N 44°24′19″E
- Country: Armenia
- Province: Lori
- Elevation: 1,445 m (4,741 ft)

Population (2011)
  - Total: 231
- Time zone: UTC+4 (AMT)

Bovadzor (Armenian: Բովաձոր) is a village in the Lori Province of Armenia.

== Toponymy ==
During the Soviet era, the village was named Maksim Gorki (Armenian: Մաքսիմ Գորկի) after the Soviet writer, Maxim Gorkiy. The village was also previously known as Aleksandrovka (Armenian: Ալեքսանդրովկա).
