= Gödəkli =

- Municipality
- Location within Azerbaijan
- Coordinates: 41°31′22″N 48°42′17″E
- Country: Azerbaijan
- Rayon: Khachmaz

Population
  - Total: 1,053
- Time zone: UTC+4 (AZT)
  - Summer (DST): UTC+5 (AZT)

Gödəkli (known as Aleksandrovka until 1992) is a village and municipality in the Khachmaz Rayon of Azerbaijan. It has a population of 1,053. It was founded in the early twentieth century by immigrants from central Russia.
