= Plopi, Cantemir =

Plopi
- Commune
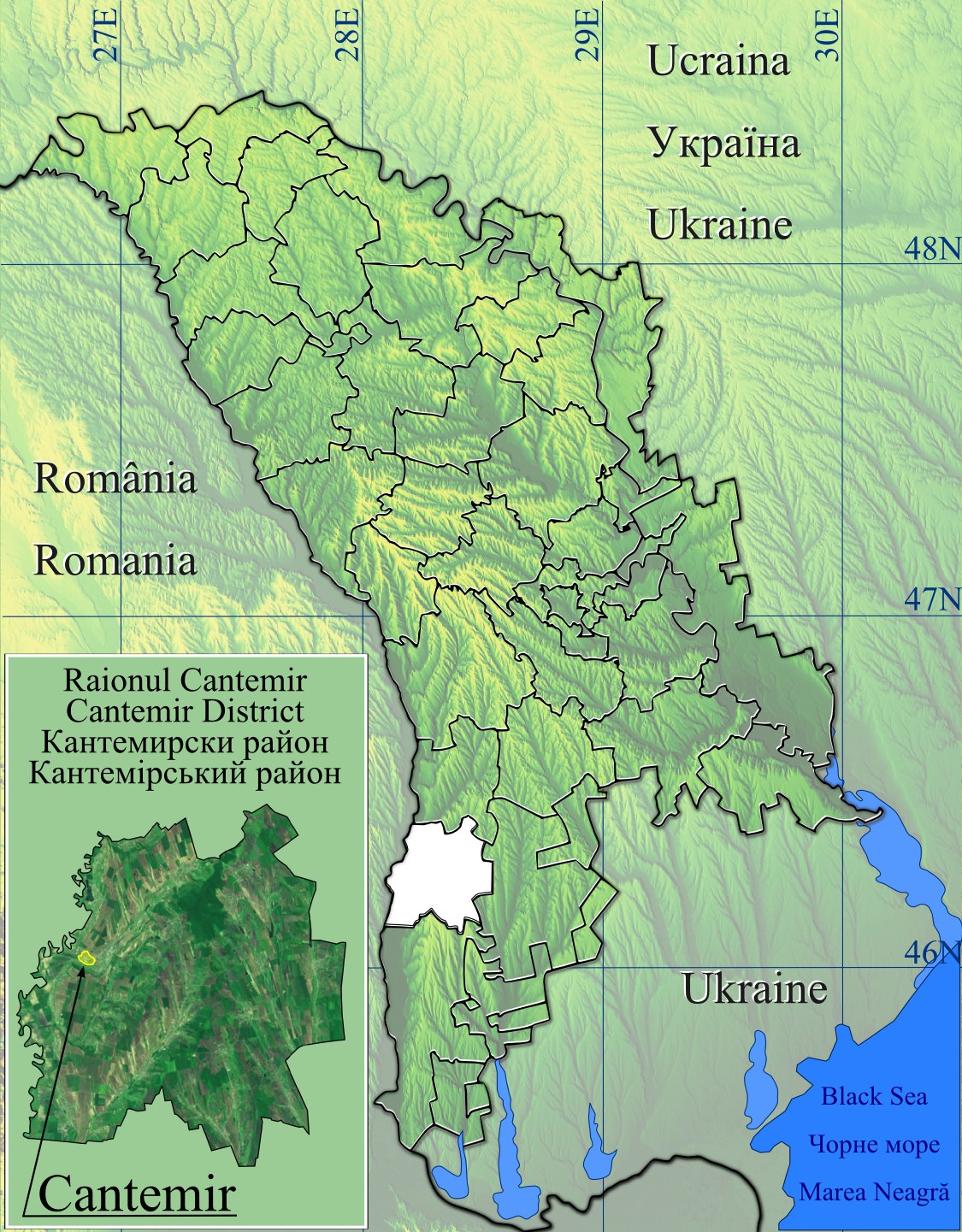
- Location within Cantemir
- Coordinates: 46°12′6″N 28°13′00″E
- Country: Moldova
- District: Cantemir District

Government
  - Mayor: Rusu Nicolae, PLDM
- Elevation: 152 m (499 ft)

Population (2014)
  - Total: 1,384
- Time zone: UTC+2 (EET)
  - Summer (DST): UTC+3 (EEST)
- Postal code: MD-7331

Plopi is a commune in Cantemir District, Moldova. It is composed of four villages: Alexandrovca, Hîrtop, Plopi and Taraclia.

== Demographics ==
According to the 2014 census, the commune has a population of 1,384 inhabitants. At the 2004 census, there were 1,668 inhabitants.

== Administration and politics ==
The composition of the Plopi Local Council (9 councilors), elected on November 5, 2023, is as follows:

| Partid | Consilieri |
|---|---|
| Coaliția pentru Unitate și Bunăstare | 4 |
| Partidul Socialiștilor din Republica Moldova | 2 |
| Partidul „Renaștere” | 1 |
| Partidul Social Democrat European | 1 |
| Partidul Acțiune și Solidaritate | 1 |
