= Băiuș =

Băiuș Bajusch
- Commune
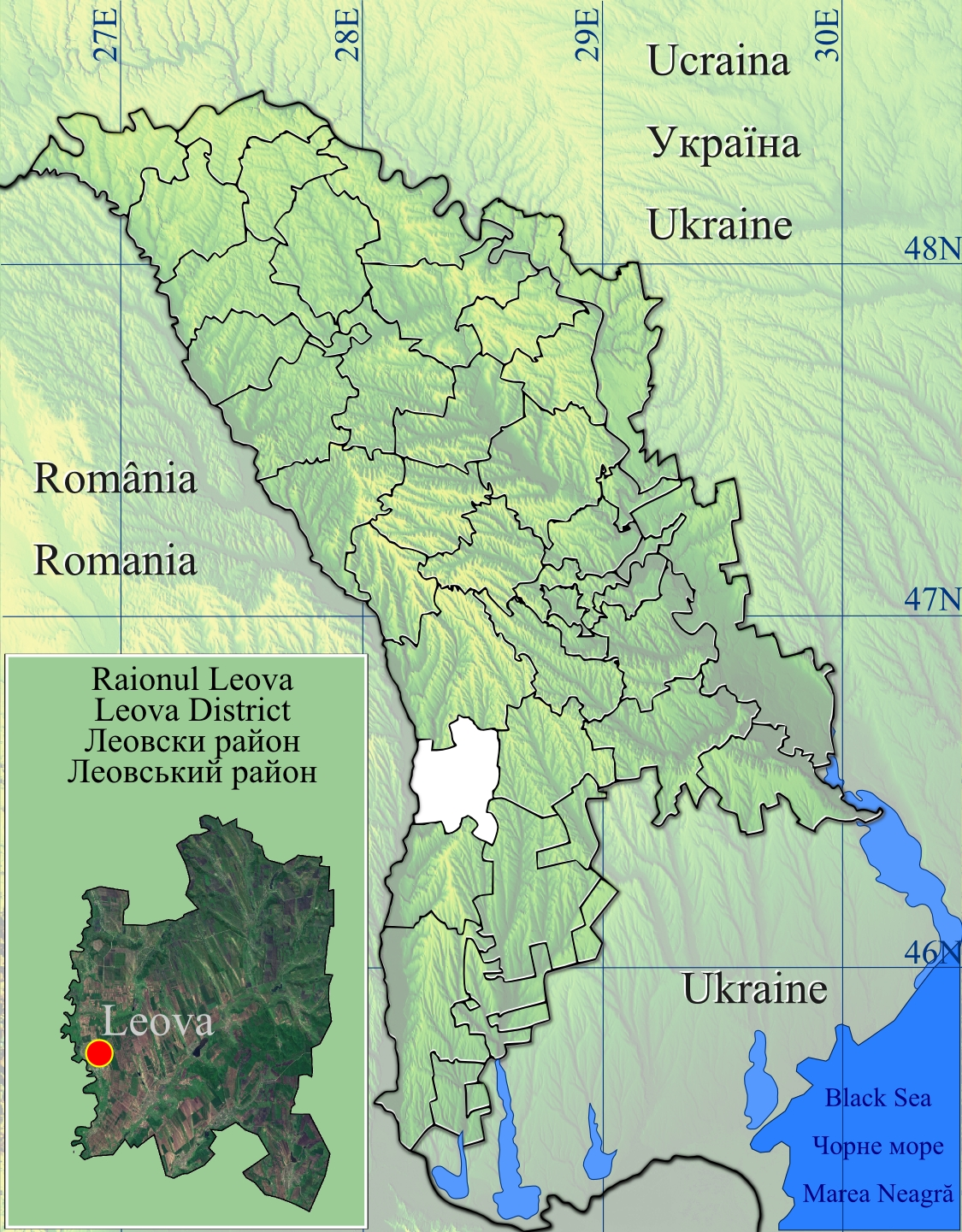
- Location within Moldova Leova
- Coordinates: 46°27′5″N 28°28′58″E
- Country: Moldova

Government
  - Mayor: Tatiana Panfili (PDM), 2015-

Area
  - Total: 35 km^{2} (14 sq mi)
- Elevation: 154 m (505 ft)

Population (2014)
  - Total: 1,059
- Time zone: UTC+2 (EET)
  - Summer (DST): UTC+3 (EEST)
- Postal code: MD-6311

Băiuș is a commune in Leova District, Moldova. It is composed of three villages: Băiuș, Cociulia Nouă and Hîrtop.
