= Căzănești, Telenești =

Căzănești
- Commune
- Location within Moldova
- Coordinates: 47.6130555556°N 28.4716666667°E
- Country: Moldova
- District: Telenești

Population (2014)
  - Total: 2,604
- Time zone: UTC+2 (EET)
  - Summer (DST): UTC+3 (EEST)

Căzănești is a commune in Telenești District, Moldova. It is composed of three villages: Căzănești, Vadul-Leca and Vadul-Leca Nou.
