= Oleksandrivka, Oleksandrivka settlement hromada, Kramatorsk Raion, Donetsk Oblast =

Urban locality in Donetsk Oblast, Ukraine

Oleksandrivka Олександрівка
- Rural settlement
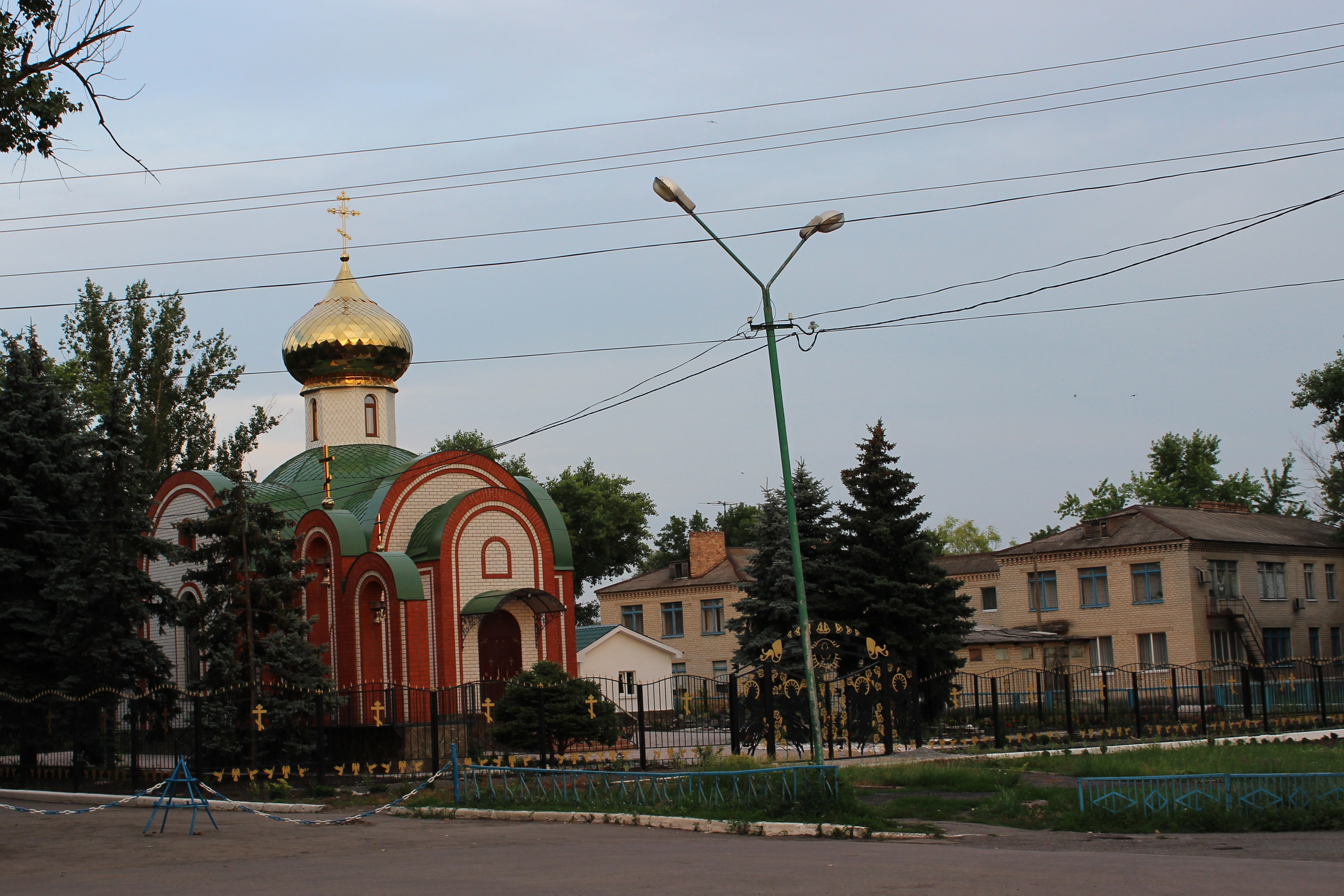
- Alexander Nevsky church

- Location within Donetsk Oblast Location within Ukraine
- Coordinates: 48.7076°N 36.9167°E
- Country: Ukraine
- Oblast: Donetsk Oblast
- Raion: Kramatorsk Raion
- Time zone: UTC+2 (EET)
  - Summer (DST): UTC+3 (EEST)

Oleksandrivka (Ukrainian: Олександрівка; Russian: Александровка) is a rural settlement in Donetsk Oblast, eastern Ukraine. It is located in the industrial region of the Donets basin. It is currently located in Kramatorsk Raion, but was formerly the administrative seat of Oleksandrivka Raion before the raion's abolition in 2020. Population: 3,338 (2022 estimate).

== History ==
During the Ukrainian War of Independence, from 1917 to 1920, it passed between various factions. Afterwards, it was administratively part of the Donets Governorate of Ukraine.

A local newspaper has been published here since March 1933.

In January 1989, the population of the settlement was 4,827 people.

In January 2013, the population of the city was 3,688 people.
