= Oleksandrivka Raion, Donetsk Oblast =

Former subdivision of Donetsk Oblast, Ukraine

Oleksandrivskyi Raion Олександрівський район
- Raion
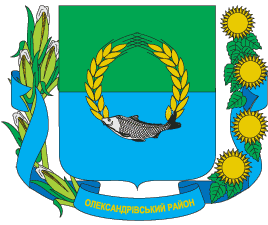
- Flag Coat of arms

- Coordinates: 48°42′19.8534″N 36°55′31.4328″E
- Country: Ukraine
- Region: Donetsk Oblast
- Established: 1923
- Disestablished: 18 July 2020
- Admin. center: Oleksandrivka
- Subdivisions: List: — city councils; 1 — settlement councils; 15 — rural councils; Number of localities: — cities; 1 — urban-type settlements; 58 — villages; 2 — rural settlements

Government
  - Governor: Oleksiy Bebeshko

Area
  - Total: 1,010 km^{2} (390 sq mi)

Population (2020)
  - Total: 17,615 ▼
  - Density: 17.4/km^{2} (45.2/sq mi)
- Time zone: UTC+02:00 (EET)
  - Summer (DST): UTC+03:00 (EEST)
- Postal index: 84000-84066
- Area code: +380 6269

Oleksandrivka Raion (Ukrainian: Олександрівський район) was one of the raions of Donetsk Oblast, located in southeastern Ukraine. The administrative center of the raion was the urban-type settlement of Oleksandrivka. The raion was abolished on 18 July 2020 as part of the administrative reform of Ukraine, which reduced the number of raions of Donetsk Oblast to eight, of which only five were controlled by the government. The last estimate of the raion population was 17,615 (2020 est.).

== Demographics ==
According to the 2001 Ukrainian Census:

Ethnicity		
Ukrainians	21,162	91.9%
Russians	1,533	6.7%
Belarusians	110	0.5%
