= Telenești District =

Coordinates: 47°35′N 28°30′E

Telenești District Raionul Telenești
- District (Raion)
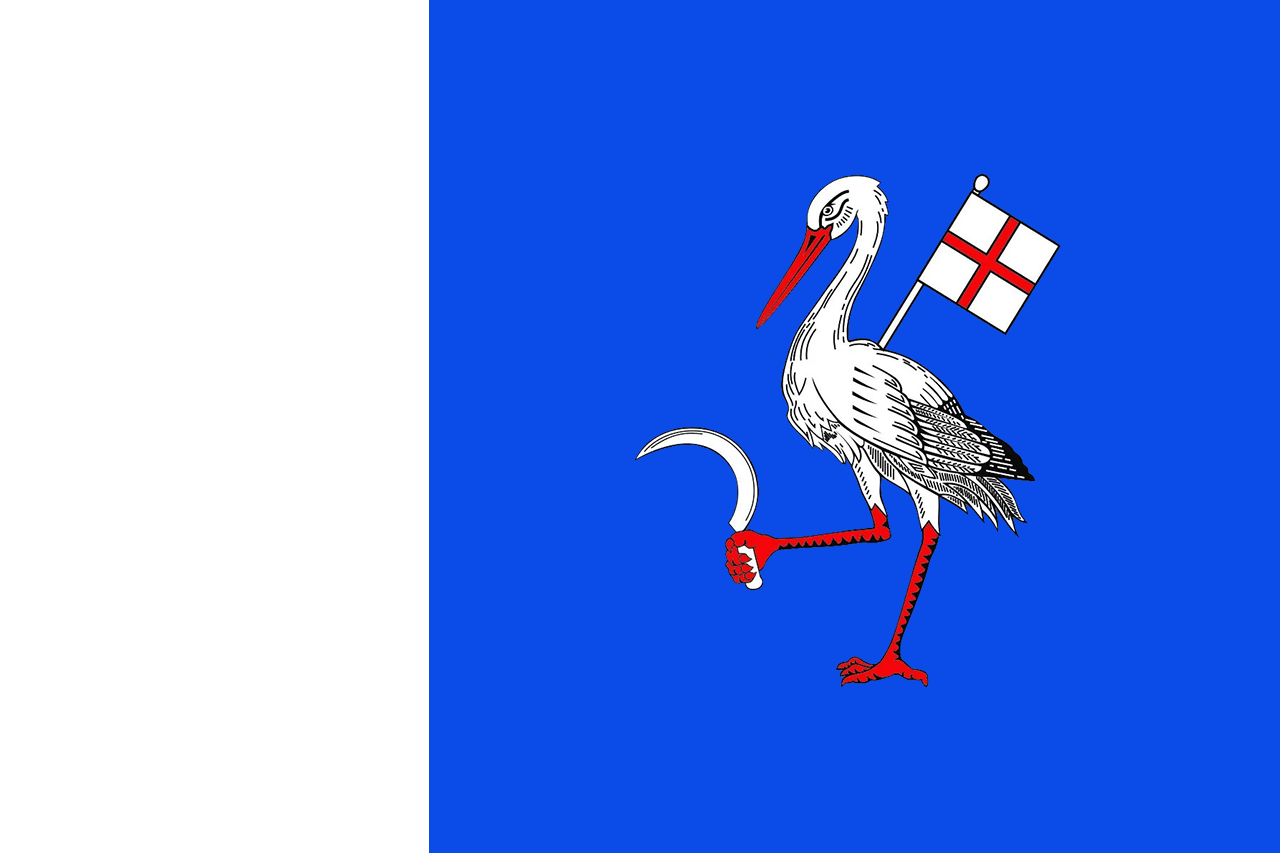
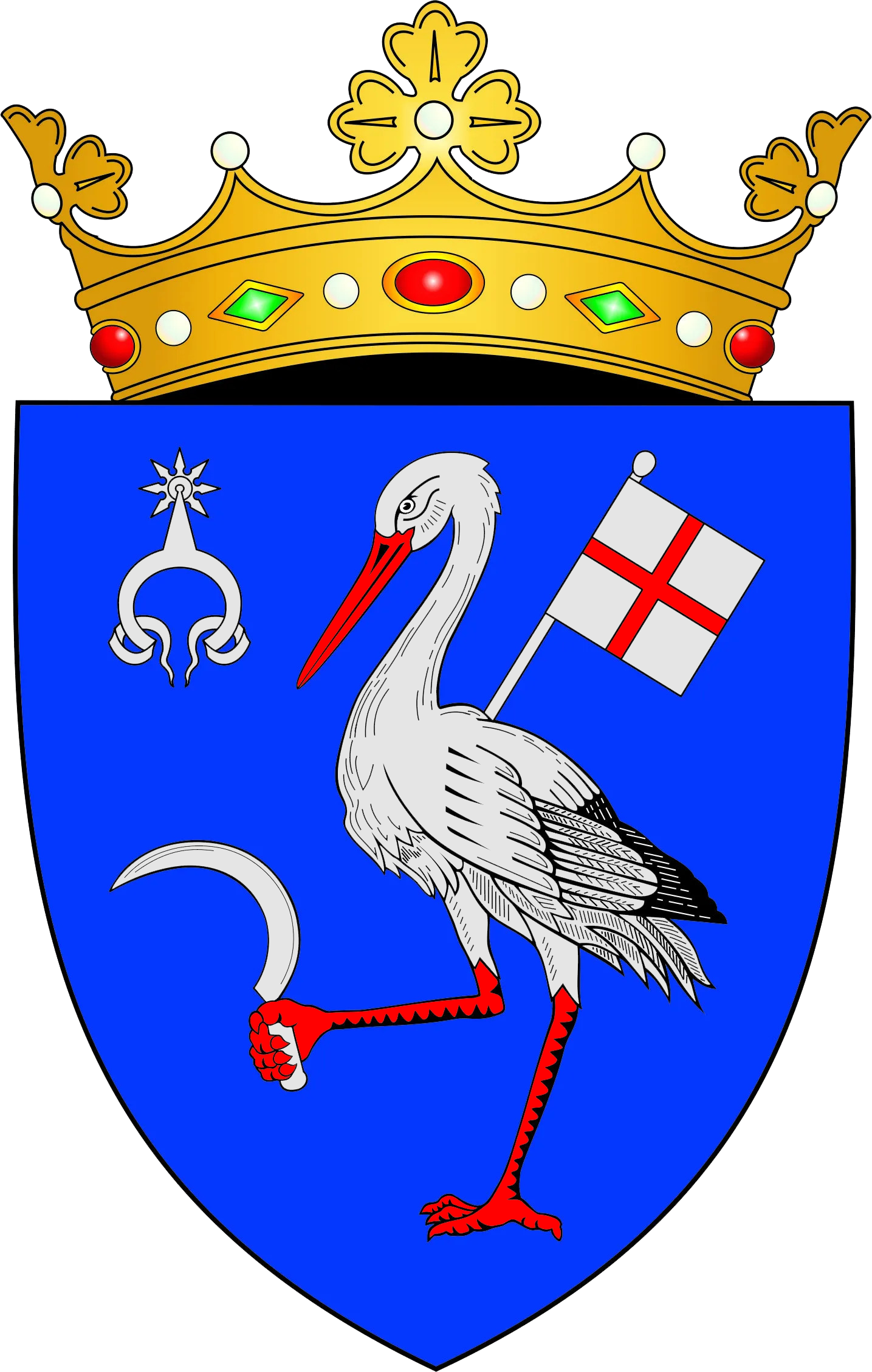
- Flag Coat of arms

- Country: Moldova
- Administrative center (Oraș-reședință): Telenești

Government
  - Type: Raion council
  - Raion president: Iurie Tulgara (PAS, 2023)

Area
  - Total: 848.6 km^{2} (327.6 sq mi)

Population (2024)
  - Total: 41,452
  - Density: 48.85/km^{2} (126.5/sq mi)
- Time zone: UTC+2 (EET)
  - Summer (DST): UTC+3 (EEST)
- Area code: +373 58
- Car plates: TL
- Website: www.telenesti.md

Telenești (Romanian pronunciation: [teleˈneʃtʲ]) is a district (Romanian: raion) in central Moldova, with the administrative center at Telenești. In the 2024 Moldovan census, the district's population was 41,452.

== History ==
The oldest recorded settlements of the district are: Banești, Peciste and Telenești, mentioned in 1437. At the time, the landowners had the right to sell their estate, in parts or entirely. In the 16th and 17th centuries, the region's economy developed (trade, agriculture, winery), resulting in a significant increase in population. In 1812, after the Treaty of Bucharest, Bessarabia was occupied by the Russian Empire, and an intense process of russification of the native population followed. In 1918, as a result of the fall of the Russian Empire, Bessarabia was united with Romania, and the Romanian government enacted a land reform. Telenești became the center of a plasă of Orhei County, along with 45 villages. The plasă capital had a courthouse and a post office with telegraph and telephone. The Romanian land reform (as opposed to the Bolshevik one) made the peasants owners of a plot of land, and the previous owners were compensated. After the Molotov–Ribbentrop Treaty, Bessarabia was occupied by the Soviet Union. In 1991, the district became a part of independent Moldova, and in 1999 it was dissolved, and its territory was included in Orhei County, until 2003, when it was reestablished as an administrative unit of Moldova.

== Geography ==
Map of Telenești District

Telenești district is located in central part of the Republic of Moldova. Does neighborhood in north Soldanesti and Florești districts, in northeast Rezina District, in southeast Orhei District, Calarași and Ungheni districts in south and northwest Singerei District. The landscape is broken by an intense process of sliding. In northwestern of district stretching branches of Plateau of Nistru and the south Central Moldavian Plateau. District basement contains deposits of limestone, stone in places Căzănești, Ordășei, Pistruieni and sand for construction to Verejeni, Telenești.

=== Climate ===
District climate is temperate continental. July average temperature is 28 °C (82 °F), for January −4 °C (25 °F). Annual precipitation 500–600 mm. Average wind speed is 2–5 m/s.

=== Fauna ===
Rich and varied fauna is represented by red deer, wild boar, foxes, wolves, badgers, rabbits. Of birds there are: jays, doves, starlings, storks, gulls, herons, hawks, owls and others.

=== Flora ===
Flora features Moldovian codri of trees: oak, beech, lime, ash, maple, acacia, nuts and others. Plants: knotweed, clover, wormwood, bellflower and others.

=== Rivers ===
District is located in the Nistru river basin. The main river crossing district is Raut (286 km), with its tributaries Ciuluicul Mare and Ciuluc de Mijloc. Most lakes are artificial. The largest lake is Lake Verejeni built on Ciuluicul Mare.

== Administrative subdivisions ==
- Localities: 54
- Administrative center: Telenești
- Cities: Telenești
- Villages: 23
- Commons: 30

== Demographics ==
Historical population
Year	Pop.	±%
1959	61,794	—
1970	76,349	+23.6%
1979	74,987	−1.8%
1989	74,417	−0.8%
2004	70,126	−5.8%
2014	56,465	−19.5%
2024	41,452	−26.6%

In the 2024 Census, the district population was 41,452 of which 11.3% urban and 88.7% rural population.

=== Ethnic groups ===
Ethnic group	% of total
Moldovans *	90.8
Romanians *	8.2
Ukrainians	0.6
Russians	0.2
Other	0.1
Undeclared	0.0

Footnote: * There is an ongoing controversy regarding the ethnic identification of Moldovans and Romanians.

=== Religion ===
- Christians - 99.6%
- Orthodox Christians - 98.4%
- Protestant - 1.2%
- Other - 0.1%
- No Religion - 0.1%
- Not Declared - 0.2%

== Economy ==
The total number of businesses that makes up 25,604 active agents (of which 24 151 farms). 62 970 ha agricultural land (74.1%). Perennial plantations occupy 5800 ha (6.8%), including 2.900 ha of vineyards (3.4%); orchards 2.040 ha (2.4%). Main crops: cereals (wheat, oats), maize, sunflower, canola, grape, in orchards: apple, peach, plum and more.

== Education ==
For the 2010-2011 school year, the district education network consists of units: 34 preschools are employed - 2530 children, 25 secondary schools and secondary schools where they study - 8121 students, seven high schools - 808 pupils, a school hospitalized children with disabilities (Telenești) - 119 children a school - boarding school for orphans (Căzăneşti) with - 85 children and a vocational school with 163 students.

== Politics ==
A large majority of district support right-wing parties. PCRM has never achieved victory in the district, in the last three elections is in a constant fall. AEI has a good support in the district.

During the last three elections AEI had an increase of 72.0%

Parliament elections results
Year	AEI	PCRM
2010	71.73% 23,104	22.41% 7,248
July 2009	63.48% 19,148	31.94% 9,636
April 2009	43.91% 13,427	42.03% 12,852

=== Elections ===
Summary of 28 November 2010 Parliament of Moldova election results in Rezina District
Parties and coalitions	Votes	%	+/−
Liberal Democratic Party of Moldova	15,894	49.13	+23.04
Party of Communists of the Republic of Moldova	7,248	22.41	−9.53
Democratic Party of Moldova	4,684	14.48	+1.84
Liberal Party	2,514	7.77	−4.01
European Action Movement	610	1.89	+1.89
Other Party	1,407	4.32	+1.99
Total (turnout 61.78%)	32,588	100.00	

== Culture ==
Cultural sector of the district is represented by the activity: 44 cultural centers, 47 libraries, school district music with branches in the district, a school of fine arts - with 150 children, 4 museums.

== Health ==
Working in district: District hospital, centers of family doctors, a unit of health centers - 5 units, 33 offices of family doctors, pharmacies (hospital) - 1 unit and branches - 31 units, pharmacies and private extra - 10 units.

== Personalities ==
- Andrei Năstase
