= Albota de Sus =

Albota de Sus Горна Албата
- Commune
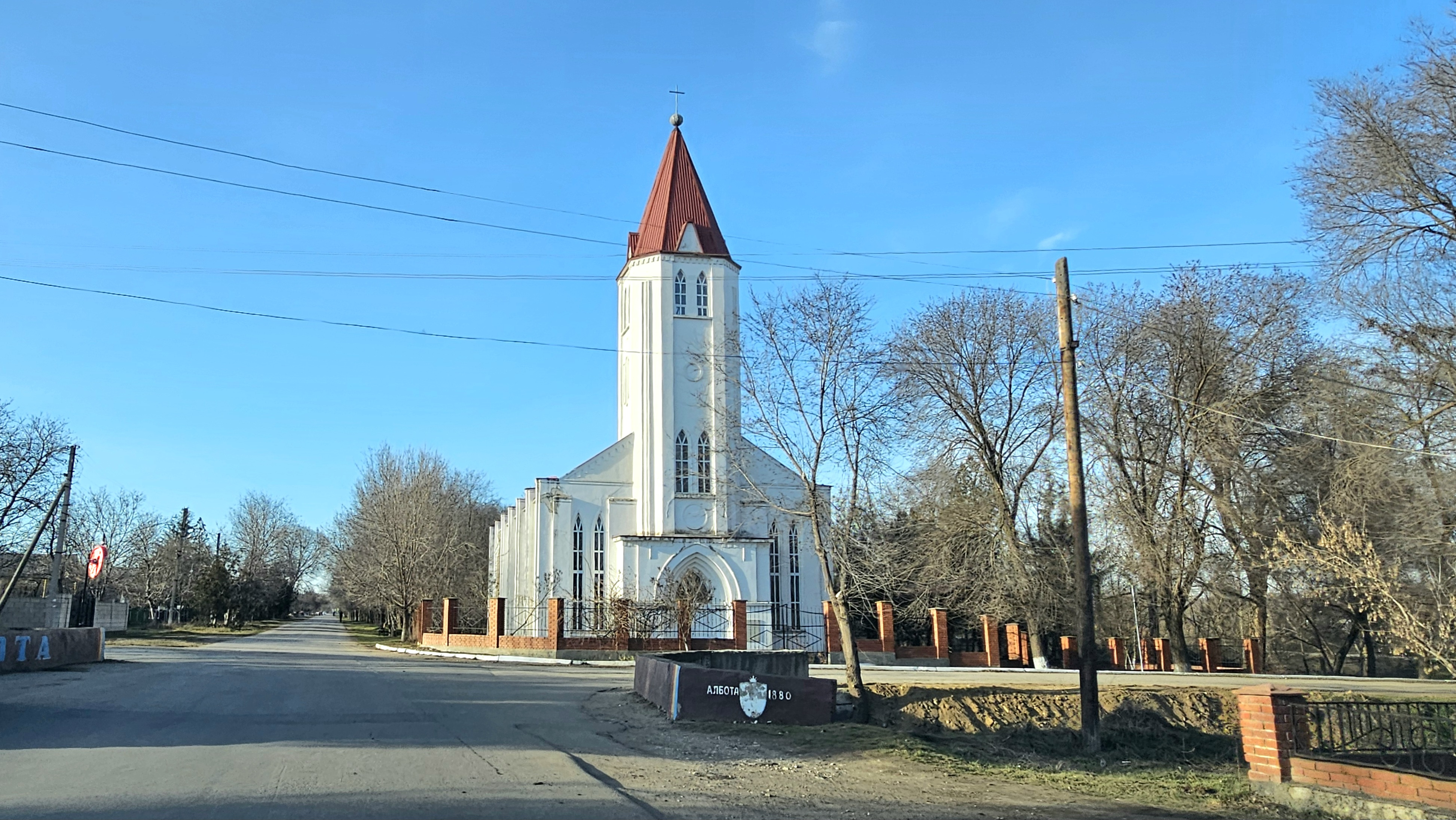
- Elijah the Prophet church in Albota de Sus

- Location of Albota de Sus in Moldova
- Coordinates: 45.9667°N 28.46°E
- Country: Moldova
- District: Taraclia District

Government
  - Mayor: Alexandr Tatarescu

Population (2024)
  - Total: 1,304

Ethnicity (2024 census)
  - Moldovans: 31.4%
  - Bulgarians: 30.9%
  - other: 37.7%
- Time zone: UTC+2 (EET)
  - Summer (DST): UTC+3 (EEST)
- Climate: Cfb

Albota de Sus (Bulgarian: Горна Албата) is a commune and village in Taraclia District, Moldova. According to the 2024 Moldovan census the village has 1,304 people, 410 (31.4%) of them being Moldovans, 403 (30.9%) Bulgarians, 312 (23.9%) Gagauz.

The commune is composed of the following villages:

- Albota de Sus (Bulgarian: Горна Албата)
- Roșița (Bulgarian: Рошица)
- Sofievca (Bulgarian: Софиевка)

== History ==
=== Roșița ===
Roșița (Bulgarian: Рошица) is the oldest village in the commune. Its first documentation dates back to 1786. Initially the village went under the Tatar name Chukur-Meshe. Locals still use the name Chukur (Russian: Чукур) to refer to their village.

=== Sofievca ===
Sofievca (Bulgarian: Софиевка, German: Sofievka, Sofijewka, Sofieni) was founded by Lutheran Germans in 1892, becoming a part of the Albota parish. The founders were from the colonies of Alt-Posttal (Ukrainian: Ярославове), Berezina (Ukrainian: Соборне, Березине) and Wittenberg (Ukrainian: Прикордонне). By 1939 the village had a population of 866.

=== Albota de Sus ===
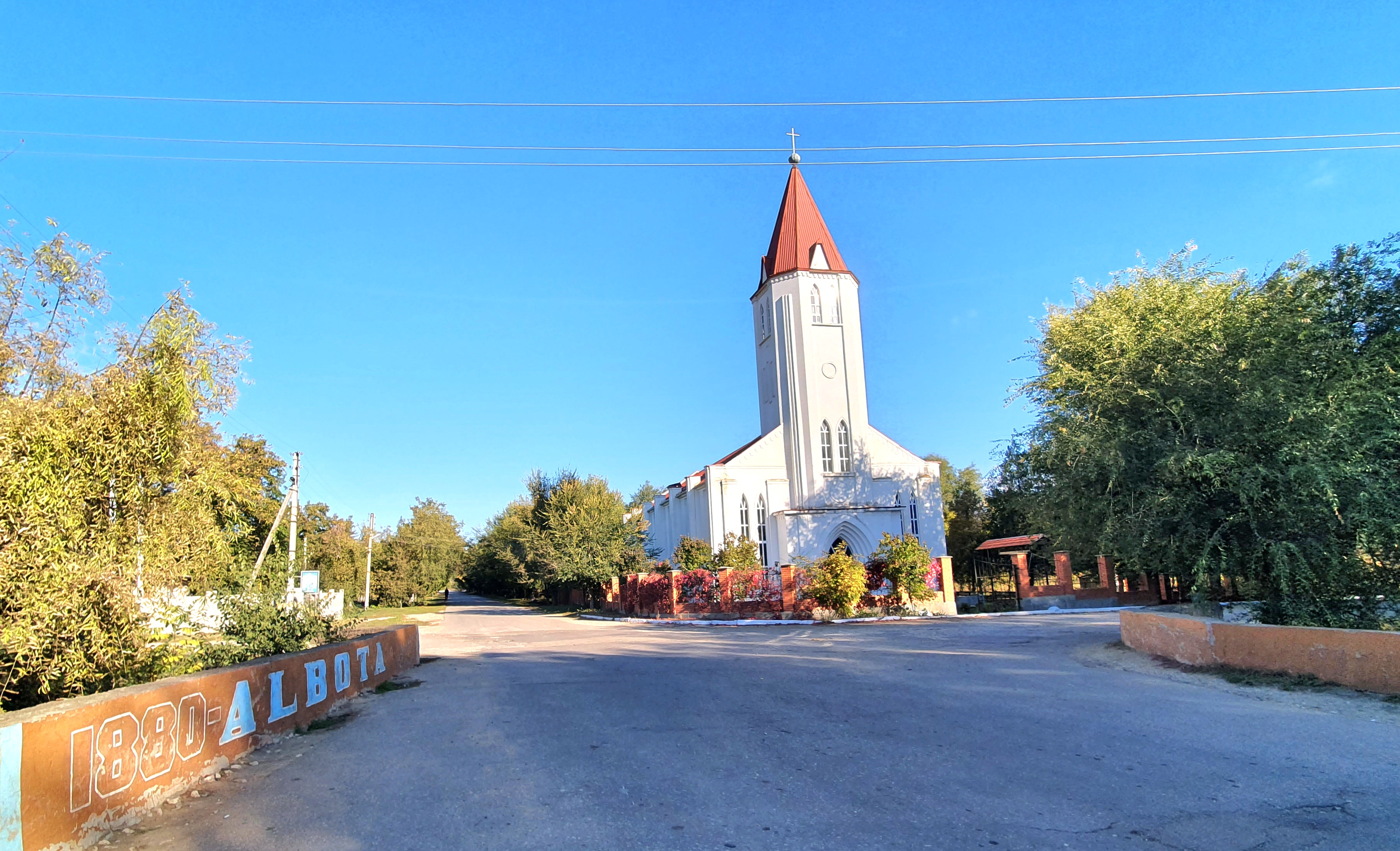
Elijah the Prophet church built in 1938, now used as an Orthodox church

Albota de Sus (Bulgarian: Горна Албата, German: Albota, Ober-Albota) was founded as a German Lutheran daughter colony, mostly by Swabians in 1880, though documents as far back as 1872 recorded it on maps. It is thought that the village derives its name from a local Budjak-Tatar tribe, named "Akbota". The parish of Albota was established in 1914 after the completion of the local parochial church, prior to this the surrounding villages belonged to the Taurino parish. The village had around 3,100 hectares of land. In 1935 the village pulled its money together for the construction of a new church. The church was completed in 1938, designed by the architect Oskar Büskel. By 1939 the settlement had a population of around 872 inhabitants.

German colonies belonging to the Albota Lutheran parish: Alexanderfeld, Alexandrowka, Baimaklia, Balaban, Eichendorf, Netusche Weiler, Neu-Dennewitz, Nußtal, Paruschowka, Sofievka, Unter-Albota.

Following the signing of the Molotov–Ribbentrop Pact, Soviet forces occupied Bessarabia. In late 1940 a four day evacuation of the Bessarabia Germans, carried out by the Schutzstaffel, took place. A total of 18,894 people from the Albota parish were evacuated, alongside 2,226 wagons and 4,432 horses. The evacuated Bessarabia Germans from Albota parish were resettled in Gau Bayreuth (Bavaria), specifically to Amberg, Bayreuth, Coburg, Fränkische Schweiz, Lichtenfels-Staffelstein and Neumarkt in der Oberpfalz.

The remaining Germans were mostly arrested, executed and deported to Siberia in the periods of 1941 and post 1945, with the people from other parts of Moldova moving into the settlement. Today the village is majority Moldovan and Bulgarian.

== Demographics ==
According to the 2024 census, 1,304 inhabitants lived in the commune of Albota de Sus, a decrease compared to the previous census in 2014, when 1,944 inhabitants were registered.

Ethnic composition of Albota de Sus commune (2024)
Ethnic group	Population	% Percentage
Moldovans	410	31.4%
Romanians	1	0.1%
Bulgarians	403	30.9%
Gagauz	312	23.9%
Russians	103	7.9%
Ukrainians	60	4.6%
Romani	2	0.2%
Others	13	1.0%
Total	1,304	100%

== See also ==
- Bessarabia Germans
