= Controversy over ethnic and linguistic identity in Moldova =

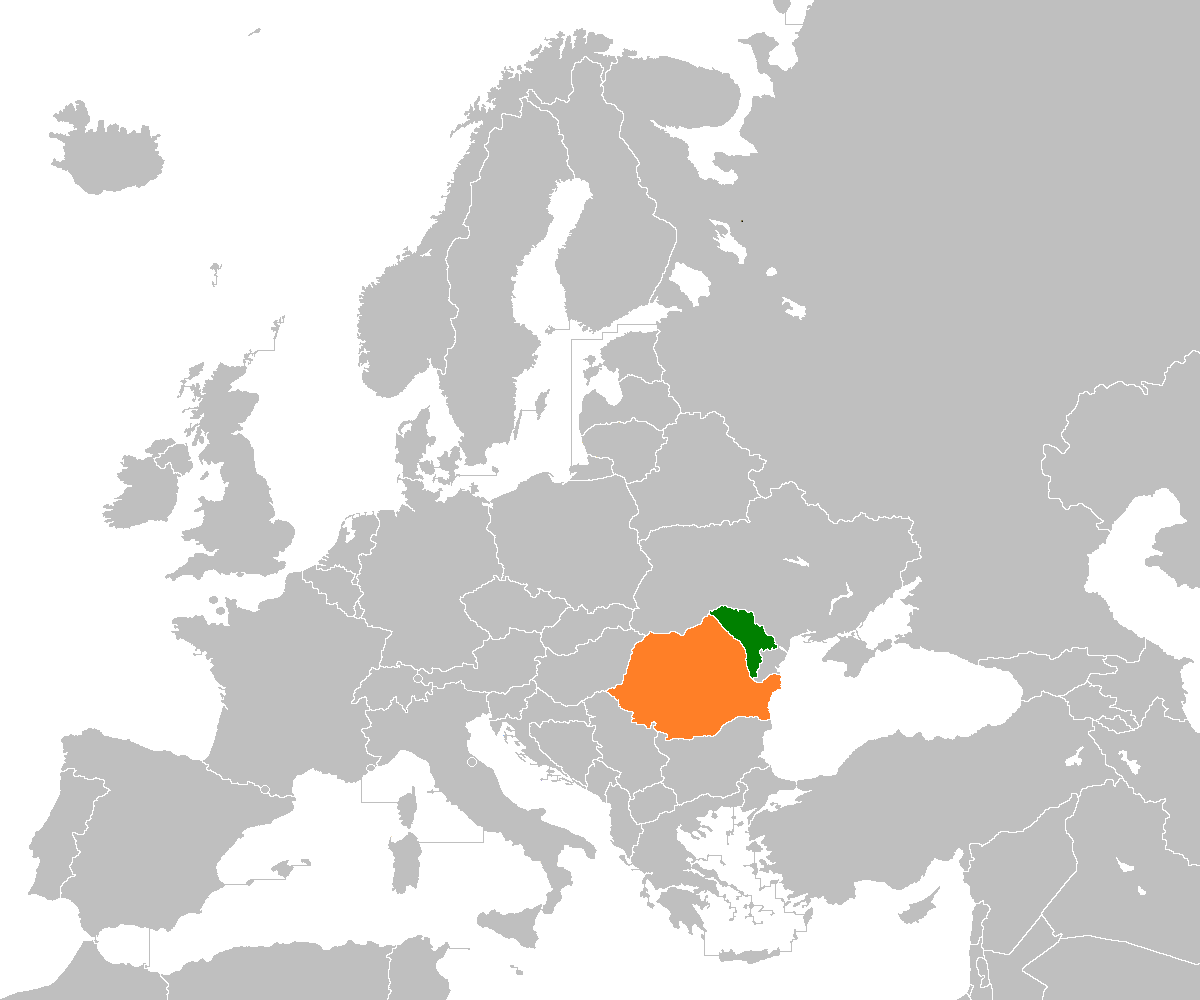
Map of Europe, showing Moldova (green) and Romania (orange)

A controversy has long surrounded the national identity of the main ethnic group in Moldova and the name of its native language. The issue most often disputed is whether Moldovans constitute a subgroup of Romanians or a separate ethnic group. At the same time, while there is wide agreement about the existence of a common language, and the state has officially called it Romanian since 2013 (confirmed in law in 2023), the name Moldovan has endured among parts of the population.

The 1991 Declaration of Independence of the Republic of Moldova called the official language Romanian, and the first anthem of independent Moldova was "Deșteaptă-te, române!" ("Awaken Thee, Romanian!"), the same as Romania's. Mirroring political developments in the country, the 1994 constitution instead named the official language Moldovan and established as the anthem "Limba noastră" (“Our language”), an ode to the national language whose lyrics do not explicitly name it.

The distinction between Moldovans and Romanians was endorsed by political authorities in certain periods, drawing criticism from members of Moldova’s scientific community, protests from segments of the population, and strained relations with Romania. Moldova’s school system, however, has consistently used Romanian since independence, both as the name of the language and as the national identity of the country’s majority population, in subjects such as Limba și literatura română (“Romanian language and literature”) and Istoria românilor (“History of the Romanians”).

== Self-identification and popular perceptions ==
A survey published in 2002 by a Norwegian academic group led by Pål Kolstø found that ethnic self-identification as exclusively Romanian was very low in Moldova; only 12 of 762 people (1.6%) identified as exclusively Romanian. (The group did not interview any inhabitants of Transnistria.) On the question of whether ethnic Moldovans differ from ethnic Romanians, 26% of the self-proclaimed Moldovans said "very different", 55% "somewhat different", and only 5% saw no difference. In contrast, on the question about the difference between the Moldovan and Romanian language, 53.5% saw no difference, 33.3% considered them "somewhat different", and 11% did not know. Kolstø et al. concluded that "Whatever the Romanian-speaking population of Moldavia used to regard themselves in the interwar period, the vast majority of them have now internalized a Moldovan ethnic identity." They noted however that this identity is only "weakly related" to language.

A poll conducted in Moldova by IMAS-Inc Chișinău in October 2009 presented a somewhat detailed picture of the perception of identity inside the country. The participants were asked to rate the relationship between the identity of Moldovans and that of Romanians on a scale between 1 (entirely the same) to 5 (completely different). The poll shows that 26% of the entire sample, which includes all ethnic groups, claim the two identities are the same or very similar, whereas 47% claim they are different or entirely different. The results vary significantly among different categories of subjects. For instance, 33% of the young respondents (ages 18–29) chose the same or very similar, and 44% different or very different. Among the senior respondents (aged over 60), the corresponding figures were 18.5% and 53%. One of the largest deviation from the country average was among the residents of the capital Chișinău, for whom the figures were 42% and 44%. The poll also shows that, compared to the national average (25%), people are more likely to perceive the two identities as the same or very similar if they are young (33%), are native speakers of Romanian (30%), have higher education (36%) or reside in urban areas (30%), especially in the capital city (42%).

== Romania ==
In Romania, the inhabitants from the Republic of Moldova are colloquially called "Bessarabians" (basarabeni, after the Bessarabia region), in order to be distinguished from the inhabitants of the Romanian Moldavia region who also generally refer to themselves (or are referred to by the inhabitants of the other Romanian regions) as "Moldavians" (moldoveni), but declare Romanian ethnicity.

== Linguistic dispute ==
The 1994 Constitution calls the official language Moldovan, while the 1991 Moldovan Declaration of Independence refers to it as Romanian." The national school curriculum for 2012–13 lists the subjects "Limba și literatura română" (Romanian language and literature) and "Istoria românilor și universală" (literally History of Romanians and universal (history)). Romanian language was the name of the subject taught in schools since Moldova declared independence. As of 2013, the government of Moldova lists "Romanian" as one of the language options to view their website. Also, in December 2013, a decision of the Constitutional Court of Moldova ruled that the Declaration of Independence takes precedence over the Constitution and the state language should be called "Romanian". In March 2023, the Parliament of Moldova approved a law referring to the national language as Romanian in all legislative texts and the constitution, making the name Moldovan obsolete. This name only continues to be used in the unrecognized republic of Transnistria.

There is essentially no disagreement that the standard form of the official language in Moldova is identical to standard Romanian; the spoken language of Moldova, in spite of small regional differences, is completely understandable to speakers from Romania and vice versa. The slight differences are in pronunciation and the choice of vocabulary. For example, cabbage, drill and watermelon are respectively "curechi", "sfredel" and "harbuz" in both the Republic of Moldova and the Romanian part of Moldavia, but their synonyms "varză", "burghiu" and "pepene" are preferred in Wallachia.

Those who want to avoid the linguistic controversy sometimes use the clause "limba de stat" (state language).

== Dual citizenship ==
In 2001, the EU pressured Romania to require an international passport for all Moldovan travellers. Immediately thereafter, a substantial number of Moldovans began to apply for Romanian citizenship. Unofficial data from 2001 suggested that about 200,000 Moldovans also held a Romanian citizenship, despite the fact that dual citizenship was officially illegal in Moldova at the time. Due to the overwhelming number of applications, the Romanian embassy imposed a moratorium in 2002. Dual citizenship became an election issue during the 2003 local elections in Moldova. In November that year, the Moldovan parliament passed a law which allowed dual citizenship; this applied to other countries besides Romania, particularly Russia and Ukraine.

In September 2007, Romania resumed its policy of granting (or restoring as it says) Romanian citizenship to Moldovans who requested it. In response, the Communist-led Moldovan parliament passed a law (in October 2007) prohibiting anyone holding dual citizenship or residing abroad from holding public office. By 2007, some 120,000 Moldovan citizens had received Romanian citizenship. In 2009, Romania granted 36,000 more citizenships and expects to increase the number up to 10,000 per month. Romanian president Traian Băsescu claimed that over 1 million more have made requests for it, and this high number is seen by some as a result of this identity controversy. The Communist government (2001–2009), a vocal advocate of a distinct Moldovan ethnic group, deemed multiple citizenship a threat to Moldovan statehood.

The Moldovan law limiting the political rights of dual-citizenship holders was challenged to the European Court of Human Rights (ECHR) in the case of Tanase v. Moldova. On 27 April 2010, the Grand Chamber of the ECHR decided the ban was "disproportionate with the government’s purpose of ensuring loyalty" of its public servants and members of parliament.

One applicant interviewed by Der Spiegel said: "I want to go further West with this passport. I don't care about Romania." The EU Observer wrote "Many Moldovans regard the Romanian passport as the key to the EU", according to Marian Gherman, a Bucharest prosecutor whose office has investigated a network of touts and bureaucrats who were expediting citizenship applications for money. "Everybody knows it", he said. "They ask for Romanian citizenship only because it gives them the freedom to travel and work within the EU". An official from the National Citizenship Authority, NCA, in Bucharest, speaking on condition of anonymity, confirmed that Moldovans had shown little interest in acquiring Romanian nationality until 2007.

According to a 2012 study by the Soros Foundation, between 1991 and 15 August 2011 exactly 226,507 Moldovan residents have obtained Romanian citizenship. An updated study from the same source found that from the passing of the citizenship law in 1991 until the end of 2012, the number of successful applications from Moldova was 323,049. The actual number of persons granted citizenship in these applications remains unclear because each application may include minors dependent on the adult filing. The number of persons is estimated to be around 400,000.

== Political positions ==
The major Moldovan political forces have diverging opinions regarding the identity of Moldovans. This contradiction is reflected in their stance toward the national history that should be taught in schools. Forces such as the Liberal Party (PL), Liberal Democratic Party (PLDM) and Our Moldova Alliance (AMN) support the teaching of the history of Romanians. Others, such as the Democratic Party (PD) and the Party of Communists (PCRM) support the history of Republic of Moldova.

=== Moldovenism ===
The Soviet attempts, which started after 1924 and were fully implemented after 1940, to strongly emphasize the local Moldovan identity and transform it into a separate ethnicity, as well as its reiteration in the post-independence Moldovan politics, especially during the Communist government (2001–2009), is often referred to as Moldovanism. The Moldovanist position refutes the purported Romanian-Moldovan ethnic identity, and also at times the existence of a common language. US historian James Stuart Olson, in his book – An Ethnohistorical dictionary of the Russian and Soviet empires – considers that Moldovans and Romanians are so closely related to the Romanian language, ethnicity and historical development that they can be considered one and the same people.

Since "Moldovan" is widely considered merely a political term used to designate the Romanian language, the supporters of a distinct language are often regarded as anti-scientific or political. A typical example is the Moldovan-Romanian dictionary.

=== Moldovan presidents on the language and identity of Moldovans ===
Mircea Snegur, the first Moldovan President (1992–1996), was a supporter of the common Romanian-Moldovan ethnic and linguistic identity:

"În suflet eram (și sunt) mai român decât mulți dintre învinuitori."

"In my soul I was (and am) more Romanian than many of my accusers."

Vladimir Voronin, President of Moldova (2001–2009), an adversary of the common Romanian-Moldovan ethnic identity, acknowledged at times the existence of a common language:

«Limba moldovenească este de fapt mama limbii române. S-o numești română înseamnă să înșeli istoria și să-ți nedreptățești propria mamă.»

"Moldovan is in fact the mother of the Romanian language. To call it Romanian is to betray history and to commit injustice to your own mother."

"Vorbim aceeași limbă, chiar dacă o numim diferit."

"We speak the same language [in Romania and Moldova], even though we call it differently."

Mihai Ghimpu, speaker of the Moldovan Parliament and interim president (2009–2010), a supporter of the common Romanian-Moldovan ethnic identity:

"Dar ce am câștigat având la conducere oameni care știau că limba e română și că noi suntem români, dar au recunoscut acest adevăr doar după ce au plecat de la guvernare? Eu nu am venit să manipulez cetățenii, ci să le spun adevărul."

"What have we gained having as leaders people who knew that the language is Romanian and that we are Romanians, but acknowledged this truth only after they left office? I have not come to manipulate the citizens, but to tell them the truth."

== History ==
=== Principality of Moldavia (1359–1812) ===
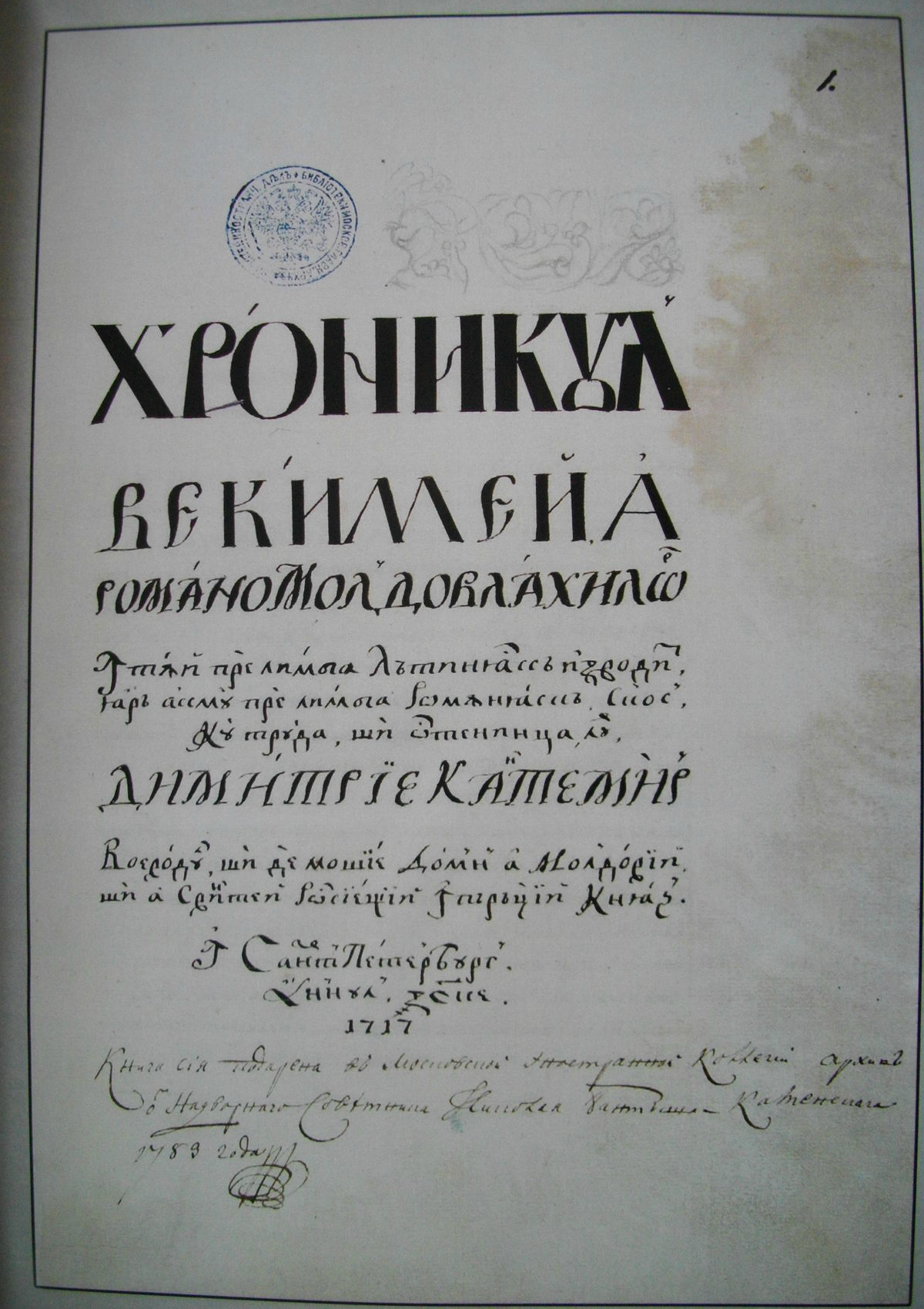
Hronicul vechimei a Romano-Moldo-Vlahilor (Chronicle of the durability of Romano-Moldo-Wallachians). Written by Moldavian Prince Dimitrie Cantemir.

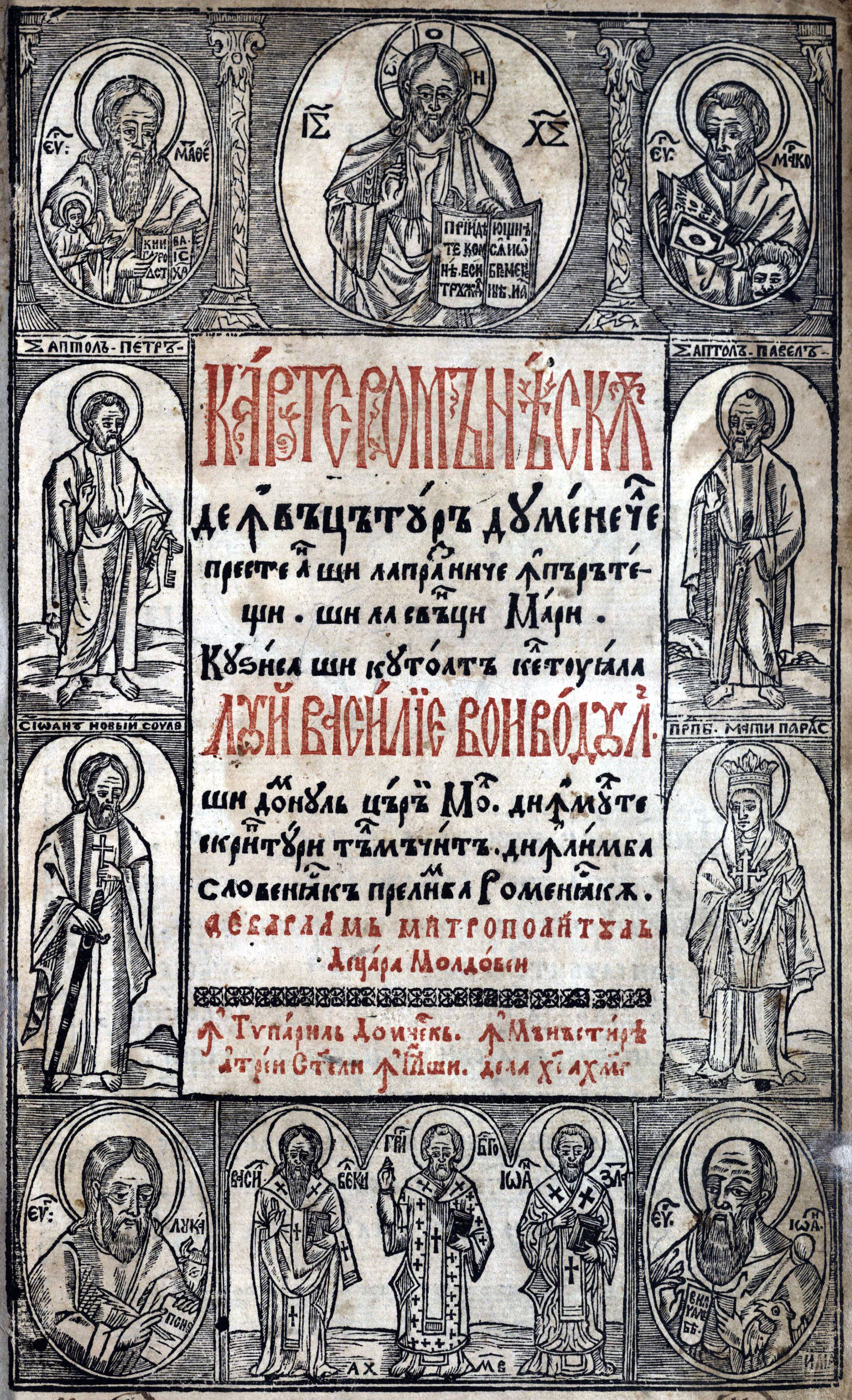
Carte Românească de Învățătură (Romanian Book of Learning). Written by Metropolitan of Moldavia, Varlaam Moțoc.

==== Moldavian identity in medieval chronicles ====
The chronicles of medieval Moldavia attested the names used by the inhabitants of Moldavia to refer to themselves as well as the common language and origin of Moldavians, Wallachians and Transylvanians. The first important chronicler of Moldavia, Grigore Ureche (1590–1647), states that the Romanians of the Hungarian Kingdom and Moldavians have the same origin, since both "come from Rome". The same author refers to the language of his work as "our Moldavian language". Later, chronicler Miron Costin (1633–1691) wrote in his On the Moldavian nation that the "oldest and more righteous" name of the people inhabiting Moldavia, Wallachia and Transylvania is Rumân (Romanian), "that is Roman", and that this name was kept from Emperor Trajan's colonizations till to that day, albeit more commonly among the Wallachians and Transylvanians. He also mentioned that, while the people of Moldavia identify as "Moldavian", they call their language "Romanian". His son, chronicler Nicolae Costin (1660–1712), expressed similar opinions. The Wallachian chronicler Constantin Cantacuzino (1655–1716) explains that by Romanians he means Romanians from Wallachia, Transylvania, and Moldavia, as they all speak essentially the same language and have a common origin. Nevertheless, he also states that, unlike the Wallachians and Transylvanians, which identify as "Romanians", the population of Moldavia identifies as "Moldavian". Dimitrie Cantemir (1673–1723), Prince of Moldavia and member of the Royal Academy of Berlin, wrote a history book called Hronicul vechimei a Romano-Moldo-Vlahilor (Chronicle of the Ancientness of the Romanian-Moldavian-Vlachs). In the introductory part, he calls it "a chronicle of the entire Romanian land" (Hronicon a toată Țara Românească) that "later was divided into Moldavia, Wallachia and Transylvania" (care apoi s-au împărțit în Moldova, Muntenească și Ardealul) and mentions that the book was first written in Latin and then translated into Romanian (pre limba românească). While attesting that the people of Moldavia call themselves "Moldavians", he also states that "Romanian" is to be used when referring commonly to Transylvanians, Moldavians and Wallachians (carii cu toții cu un nume de obște români să chiamă).

==== Selected foreign travelers about Moldavians ====
Several foreign travelers through Moldavia since the 16th century noted that locals called themselves "Romanians" and their language "Romanian". They also mention the awareness of a common Roman origin among the inhabitants of Moldavia and neighbouring Wallachia and Transylvania . Georg Reicherstorffer (1495–1554), a Transylvanian Saxon, was the emissary of Ferdinand I of Habsburg in Wallachia and Moldavia. Reicherstorffer had traveled in 1527 and 1535 in the Principality of Moldavia and wrote his travel memoirs – Moldaviae quae olim Daciae pars, Chorographia (1541) and also Chorographia Transylvaniae (1550). Describing the geography of Moldavia he finds that "besides this name it is also called Wallachia" and then speaking about the Moldavian people he says that "the Roman [Italian] language still endures in this nation...so the Wallachians [from Moldavia] are an Italian nation, as they claim, from the old Romans". A chronicler and mercenary from Verona, Alessandro Guagnini (1538–1614), traveled twice in Moldavia and helped Despot Vodă (Ioan Iacob Heraclid) gain the throne in 1563. In his biography of the prince, "Vita despothi Principis Moldaviae", he described to the people of Moldavia:"This nation of Wallachians refer to themselves as Romana and say that they originate from exiled Romans of Italy. Their language is a mixture of Latin and Italian languages, so that an Italian can easily understand a Wallachian". After a visit to Moldavia an anonymous traveler, probably an Italian Jesuit, wrote in 1587 a description of the people and found that "these people [Moldavians] belong to the Greek faith, they take kindly to everything that is Roman, maybe because of their corrupted language from Latin, or for the belief they have about their descent from the Romans, as they call themselves Romans". Also, according to these sources, the Slav neighbours called Moldovans "Vlachs" or "Volokhs", a term equally used to refer to all the Romance speakers from Wallachia, Transylvania, and the Balkan Peninsula. Nicolaus Olahus (1493–1568), prominent humanist, writes in Hungaria et Attila that the Moldavians have the same language, rituals and religion as the Wallachians and that the only way to distinguish them is by their clothes. He also mentions that the language of Moldavians and other Vlach peoples was once Roman (Latin), as they all were colonies of the Roman Empire.

Thomas Thornton (1762–1814) wrote a book in 1807 about his numerous travels inside the Ottoman Empire and says that the Wallachian and Moldavian peasants call themselves "Rumun, or Roman", to distinguish themselves from boyars (local nobles), and that their language is a corrupt Latin.

==== Early works in the local language of Moldavia ====
Similarly, in 1643, The Moldavian Prince Vasile Lupu sponsored a book of homilies translated by Metropolitan Varlaam of Moldavia from Slavonic into Romanian (pre limba Romeniască) and titled Carte Românească de Învățătură (Romanian Book of Learning) . The foreword by Prince Lupu says that it is addressed to the entire Romanian nation everywhere (la toată semenția românească de pretutindeni). The book, also known as "Cazania of Varlaam" (Varlaam's Homiliary), was the very first printed in Moldavia and large numbers of copies spread in the neighboring provinces inhabited by Romanian speakers. Furthermore, as a reaction to the translation in Transylvania of the Calvinist catechism into Romanian, Metropolitan Varlaam wrote in 1645 a "Response to the Calvinist Catechism" (Răspuns la Catehismul calvinesc) addressed to "the beloved Christians and with us one Romanian nation" from Transylvania Vasile Lupu sponsored the printing in 1646 of the first code of laws in Moldavia titled Romanian Book of Learning (Carte românească de învățătură de la pravilele împărătești și de la alte giudețe). The book was inspired by Byzantine tradition and in 1652 a virtually identical code of laws appeared in Wallachia, sponsored by Prince Matei Basarab.

Moldavian Metropolitan Dosoftei printed Dumnezaiasca Liturghie (Divine Liturgy) in Romanian (tiparita româneste). In his "Foreword to the Romanian nation" (Cuvânt depreuna catra semintia rumaneasca), Dosoftei calls the book a gift to the Romanian language (acest dar limbii rumânesti) translated from Greek (de pre elineasca) into Romanian (pre limba rumâneasca).

Later, after the annexation of Bessarabia by the Russian empire, religious books written in the region commonly called the language "Moldavian". Thus a menologium printed in Chișinău in 1819 states it was translated from Slavonic into Moldavian (тълмъчиндуль де пре лимба Словенѣскъ пре чѣ Молдовенѣскъ), as does a typicon from 1821 (Сау тълмъчить Молдовенеще де пре чель Словенескь).

==== Diplomats' opinion ====
Joseph II, Ruler of the Austrian Empire and Catherine II, Empress of Russia between 1762–1796, were willing to unite Moldavia and Wallachia, then under Ottoman sovereignty, in order to create an independent buffer state between Russia and Austria. The proposed independent state, named Dacia, would have contained Moldavia, Bessarabia and Wallachia, but Catherine wished it under Russian influence as it was presented in the so-called "Greek Project". During the British Parliament debates of 1793, Samuel Whitbread, speaking about the initiative of France to erect an independent Belgium from Austria, mentions Edmund Burke's initiative to form an independent state from the Ottoman Empire, named Circle of the Danube comprising Wallachia, Moldavia and Bessarabia. Also, the memoirs of Sir James Porter (1720–1786), British diplomat, ambassador to the Sublime Porte in Istanbul from 1747 to 1762, mentions that, inside the Ottoman Empire, next in number to the Slavonians are the Rumelians or Romani, to whom the Moldavians and Wallachians belong, who call themselves Rumuryi.

=== Bessarabia in the Russian Empire (1812–1918) ===
In 1812, the eastern part of the Principality of Moldavia, called Bessarabia, which includes the current territory of Republic of Moldova (except for Transnistria) was ceded by the Ottomans to the Russian empire.

The idea of a unified state including all Romanian speakers from Transylvania, Moldavia and Wallachia did not emerge before the 18th century, as it was "foreign to the spirit of the age". Starting with the 18th century, a pan-Romanian national idea appeared, inspired by the German and French romantic nationalism. The young boyars from Moldavia and Wallachia educated in western universities returned home with ambitious political goals to modernize their countries, and sought to accomplish the ideal of a unified Romanian nation state. One important step was achieved in 1859, in a favorable international context, with the election of Alexandru Ioan Cuza as a common ruler of the autonomous principalities of Wallachia and (western) Moldavia. The newly formed Romanian state set among its primary tasks to inculcate the sentiment of belonging to a common Romanian nation to the illiterate rural majority through state-funded universal elementary school. The Romantic historical discourse reinterpreted history as a march towards the unified state. The creation of a standardized Romanian language and orthography, the adoption of the Roman alphabet to replace the older Cyrillic were also important elements of the national project. Although still under foreign rule, the masses of Romanians in the multiethnic Transylvania developed a Romanian national consciousness, owing to their interaction with the ethnic groups, and as a reaction to the status of political inferiority and the aggressive nationalist politicies of the later Hungarian national state.

Such developments were not reflected in the Russian-controlled Bessarabia. The Russification policy of the regime, more successful among the higher strata of the society, did not have an important effect on the majority of rural Moldavians. As Romanian politician Take Ionescu noted at the time, "the Romanian landlords were Russified through a policy of cooptation, the government allowing them to maintain leading positions in the administration of the province, whereas the peasantry was indifferent to the national problem: there were no schools for de-nationalization, and, although the church service was held in Russian, this was actually of little significance" Furthermore, as University of Bucharest lecturer Cristina Petrescu noted, Bessarabia missed "the reforms aimed at transforming the two united principalities [Wallachia and Moldavia] into a modern state" Irina Livezeanu claims that, moreover, at the beginning of the 20th century, peasants in all regions of the former principality of Moldavia were more likely to identify as Moldavians than the inhabitants of the cities.

In 1849, George Long writes that Wallachia and Moldavia are separated only by a political boundary and that their history is closely connected. About the latter he says that it is inhabited mainly by Wallachians who call themselves Roomoon (Romanian). Ethnologist Robert Gordon Latham, writes in 1854, that the name by which a Wallachian, Moldavian or a Bessarabian designates himself is Roman or Rumanyo (Romanian), a name the author also applies to the Romance speakers of Macedonia. Similarly, in 1845, German brothers Arthur Schott and Albert Schott (historian) write in the beginning of their book – Walachische Mährchen (Wallachian Fairy Tales) – that Wallachians live in Wallachia, Moldavia, Transylvania, Hungary, Macedonia and Thessaly. The authors also mentions that Wallachians respond Eo sum Romanu (I am Romanian) when asked what they are.

=== Bessarabia within Greater Romania (1918–1940) ===
In 1918, Sfatul Țării voted for the union of Bessarabia with the Kingdom of Romania. At the time, the Romanian army was already present in Bessarabia. US historian Charles Upson Clark notes that several Bessarabian ministers, Codreanu, Pelivan and Secara, and the Russian commander-in-chief Shcherbachev had asked for its intervention to maintain order. He also mentions that after the arrival of Romanian army "all classes in Bessarabia, except the Russian revolutionaries, breathed a sigh of relief". However, he adds that, at the beginning, the intervention had "roused great resentment among those who still clung to the hope of a Bessarabian state within the Russian Federated Republic" such as Ion Inculeț, president of Sfatul Țării and prime-minister Pantelimon Erhan who initially demanded the prompt withdrawal of the Romanian troops to avoid a civil war. However, Inculeț later welcomed Romanian general Ernest Broșteanu, who was in charge with the intervention, to a formal reception at Sfatul Țării.

Given the complex circumstances, some scholars such as Cristina Petrescu and US historian Charles King considered controversial the Bessarabian vote in favor of the union with Romania. On the contrary, historian Sorin Alexandrescu thinks that the presence of the Romanian army "did not cause the unification, [...] but only consolidated it". Similarly, Bernard Newman, who traveled by bike in the whole of Greater Romania, claimed there is little doubt that the vote represented the prevailing wish in Bessarabia and that the events leading to the unification indicate there was no question of a "seizure", but a voluntary act on the part of its people. However, the prime minister of Romania at the time, Alexandru Marghiloman, was to admit that the unification was decided in Romania, as the Daniel Ciugureanu and Ion Inculeț feared a possible revolution that an overt annexation could cause, given widespread distrust of Romanian rule and opposition to annexation by reformist Moldavians, minorities and local peasants.

Quoting Emmanuel de Martonne, historian Irina Livezeanu mentions that, around the time of the union, Bessarabian peasants "still called themselves Moldovans". She adds Ion Nistor's explanation from 1915 of a similar earlier phenomenon in the Austrian-ruled Bukovina, where peasants had called themselves Moldovans but "under the influence of the [Romanian] literary language, the term 'Moldovan' was then replaced by 'Romanian'", while "in Bessarabia this influence has not penetrated yet"

After the unification, a few French and Romanian military reports from the period mentioned the reticence or hostility of the Bessarabian ethnic minorities, at times together with Moldovans, towards the new Romanian administration. Livezeanu also notes that, at the beginning, the Moldovan urban elite educated under Russian rule spoke predominantly Russian, and despised Romania as "uncivilized" and the culture of its elite, of which it knew very little. The campaign to promote Romanian identity in Moldova was unsuccessful, and led to tensions amongst the Slavic and Gagauz minorities in Moldova. The resistance from the Moldovan population was so large that Romanian authorities instated a "state of siege" in Moldova between 1918 and 1928, restricting civil rights, giving law enforcements additional power and maintaining military presence in the region. Three major uprisings against Romanian rule took place in that period - first one near Hotin and another one in Tighina in 1919, and a third uprising in Bugeac in 1924.

Owing partly to its relative underdevelopment compared to other regions of Greater Romania, as well as to the low competence and corruption of some of the new Romanian administration in this province, the process of "turning Bessarabian peasants into Romanians" was less successful than in other regions and was soon to be disrupted by the Soviet occupation. Cristina Petrescu thinks that the transition between the Tsarist-type of local administration to the centralized Romanian administration alienated many Moldovans, and many of them felt they were rather occupied than united with "their alleged brothers". Based on the stories told by a group of Bessarabians from the villages of the Bălți County, who, notably, chose to move to Romania rather than live under the Soviet regime, Cristina Petrescu suggests that Bessarabia seems to be the only region of Greater Romania where the central authorities did not succeed "in integrating their own coethnics", most of whom "did not even begin to consider themselves part of the Romanian nation, going beyond their allegiance to regional and local ties".

=== Bessarabia within the Soviet Union (1940–1941; 1944–1991) ===
In 1940, Bessarabia, along with northern Bukovina, was incorporated into the USSR following an ultimatum sent to the Romanian government. The Soviet authorities took several steps to emphasize the distinction between the Moldovans and the Romanians, at times using the physical elimination of pan-Romanian supporters, deemed as "enemies of the people". They were repressed by the NKVD and KGB for their "bourgeois nationalism". The Soviet propaganda also sought to secure a separate status for the varieties of the Romanian language spoken in the USSR. Thus, it imposed the use of a Cyrillic script derived from the Russian alphabet, and promoted the exclusive use of the name "Moldovan language", forbidding the use of the name "Romanian language". The harsh anti-Romanian Soviet policy left a trace on the identity of Moldovans.

There were several requests to switch back to the Latin alphabet, which was seen as "more suitable for the Romance core of the language," in the Moldovan SSR. In 1965, the demands of the 3rd Congress of Writers of Soviet Moldavia were rejected by the leadership of the Communist Party, the replacement being deemed "contrary to the interests of the Moldavian people and not reflecting its aspirations and hopes".

Although established as the official alphabet of the Moldavian Soviet Socialist Republic, things began to change in 1988 and 1989 when the Soviet Union began to unravel. On August 27, 1989, the Popular Front of Moldova (FPM) organized a mass demonstration in Chișinău, that became known as the Great National Assembly, which pressured the authorities of the Moldavian Soviet Socialist Republic to adopt a language law on August 31, 1989 that proclaimed the Moldovan language written in the Latin script to be the state language of the MSSR. Its identity with the Romanian language was also established. 31 August has been the Romanian Language Day ever since.

However, the Moldovan Cyrillic alphabet is still the official and the only accepted alphabet in the breakaway Russian-supported Transnistria for this language.

== See also ==
- A language is a dialect with an army and navy – Facetious characterization of dialect
- Greater Moldova – Moldovan irredentist concept
- Homo Sovieticus – Critique of Eastern Bloc society
- Unification of Moldova and Romania – Movement for uniting Moldova and Romania
- Moldovenism – Aspect of Moldovan ethnolinguistic controversy
- Moldovan–Romanian dictionary – Dictionary compiled by Vasile Stati
- Moldova–Romania relations
- Bessarabian question – Controversy over the ownership of the geographic region of Bessarabia
- Controversy over ethnic and linguistic identity in Montenegro

== Bibliography ==
- John Barron, The KGB, Reader's Digest inc., 1974, ISBN 0-88349-009-9
- Bugai, Nikolai F.: Deportatsiya narodov iz Ukainyi, Belorussii i Moldavii – Deportation of the peoples from Ukraine, Belarus and Moldova. Druzhba Narodov, Moscow 1998, Dittmar Dahlmann & Gerhard Hirschfeld. – Essen 1999, pp. 567–581
- Charles Upson-Clark, Bessarabia, Dodd, Mead & Co., N.Y., 1927
- Frederick Kellogg, A history of Romanian historical writing, Bakersfield, Ca., 1990
- Charles King, The Moldovans: Romania, Russia, and the politics of culture, Hoover Institution Press, Stanford University, 2000. ISBN 0-8179-9792-X
- S. Orifici, The Republic of Moldova in the 1990s : from the declaration of independence to a democratic state, Geneve 1994
- A. Pop, The Soviet-Romanian controversy & Moldova's independence policy, Romanian review of international studies, 26, 1992
- Hugh Seton-Watson, New nations & states, London 1997
- Roger-William Seton-Watson, A history of the Romanians, Cambridge Univ. Press 1934
- G. Simon, Nationalism & Policy toward nationalities in the Soviet Union, Boulder, S.F., Ca, & Oxford, 1991
