= Alexanderfeld =

Alexanderfeld is a name of several localities,

- Alexanderfeld, a commune in Moldova
- Alexanderfeld, also Grishkovka, the selo in Altai Krai, Russia
- Alexanderfeld, the name of the settlement of Berezanka, Ukraine, in 1866-1914
- Alexanderfeld, the former name of the selo of Verkhovina, Ukraine
