= Alexandru cel Bun (disambiguation) =

Alexandru cel Bun may refer to:

- Alexander the Good (Alexandru cel Bun in Romanian), Moldavian voivode, reigned 1400-1432
- Alexandru cel Bun, a commune in Neamţ County, Romania
- Alexanderfeld (formerly Alexandru cel Bun or Cîmpeni), a commune in Cahul district, Moldova
- Alexandru cel Bun, a village in Vlădeni Commune, Iaşi County, Romania
- Alexandru cel Bun, a village in Voloviţa Commune, Soroca district, Moldova
- Alexandru cel Bun Military Academy, the main military academy of the Armed Forces of the Republic of Moldova.
