= Svetlîi =

Svetlîi Svetlıy
- Commune
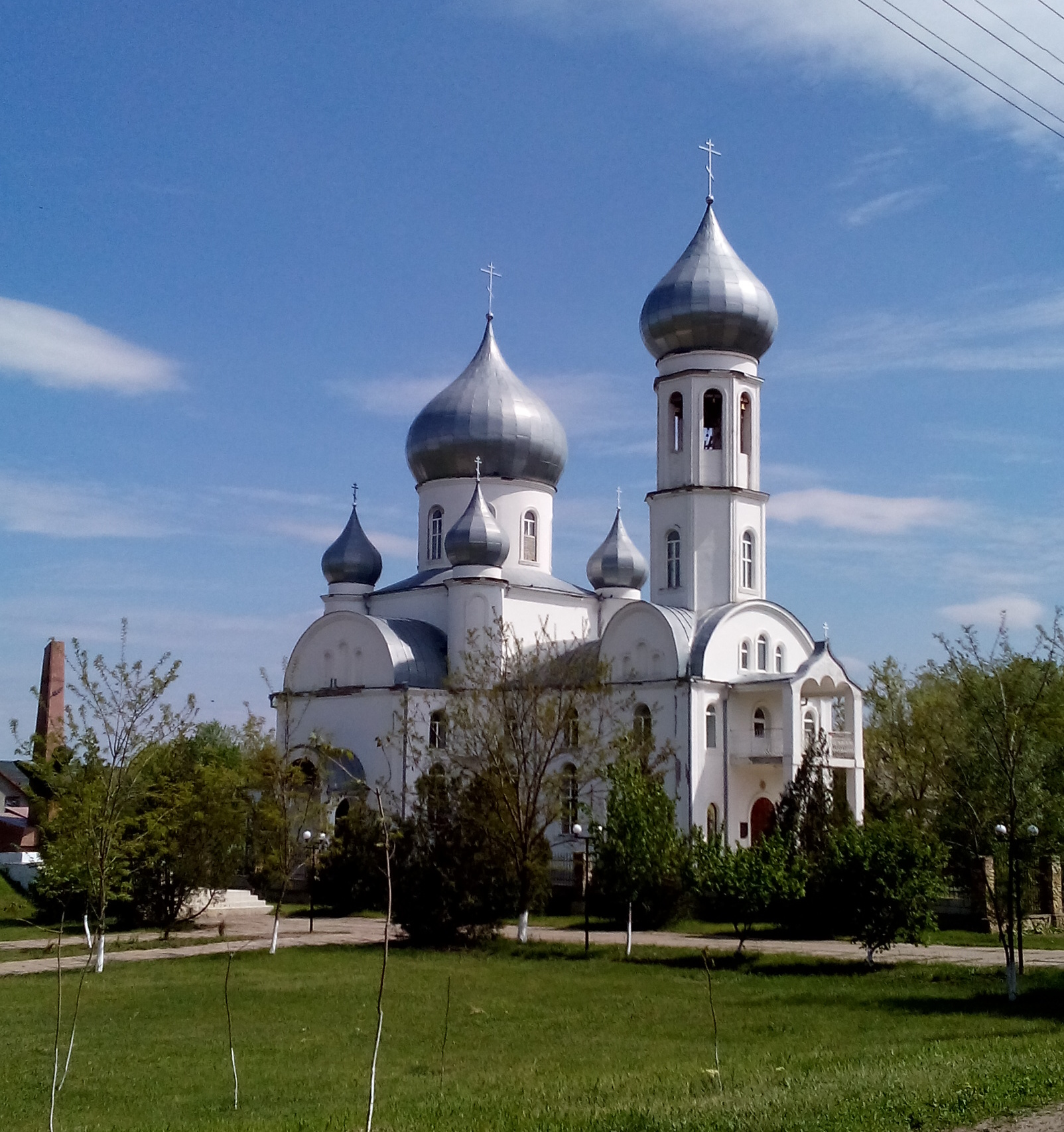
- Saint Dmitrii Church in Svetlîi

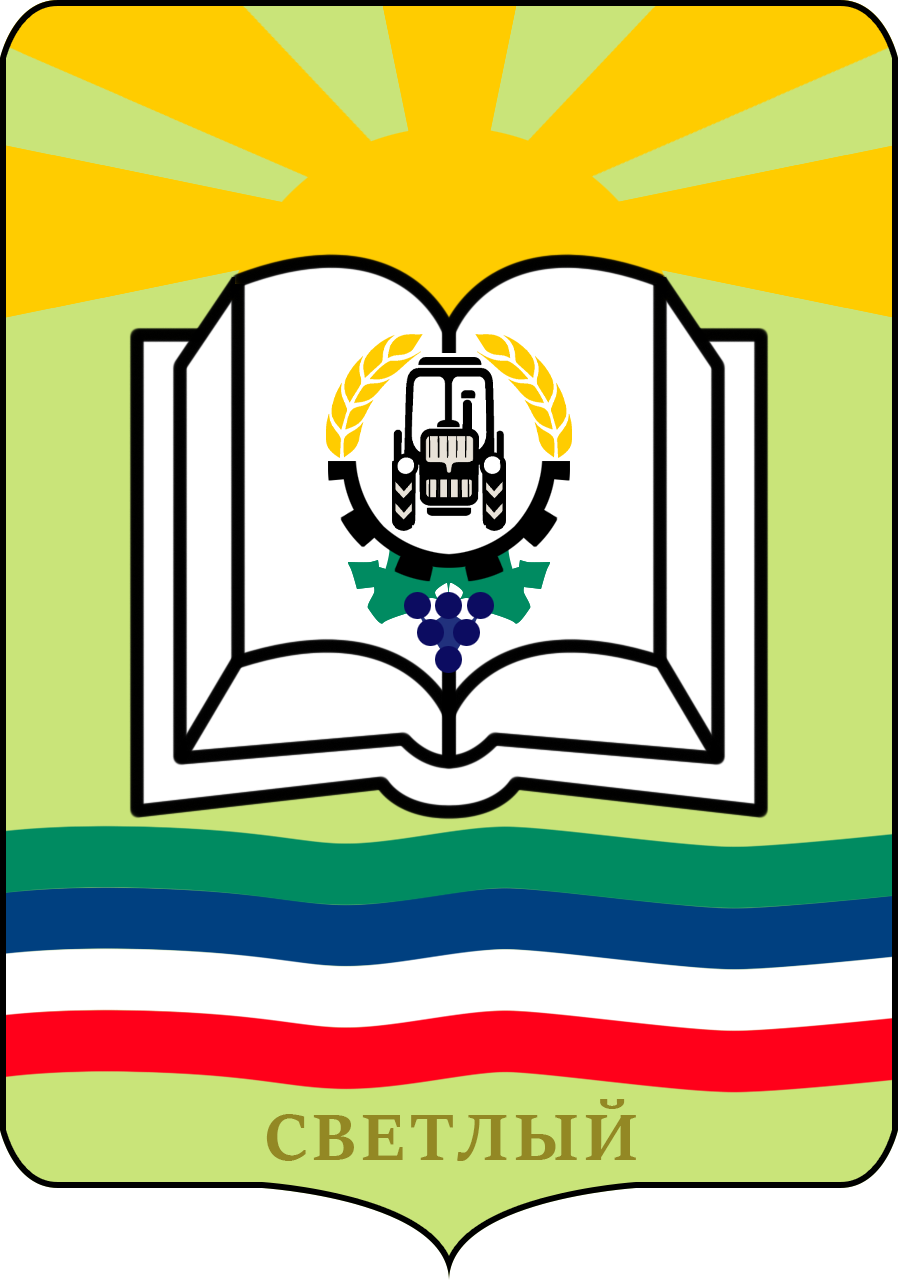
- Seal

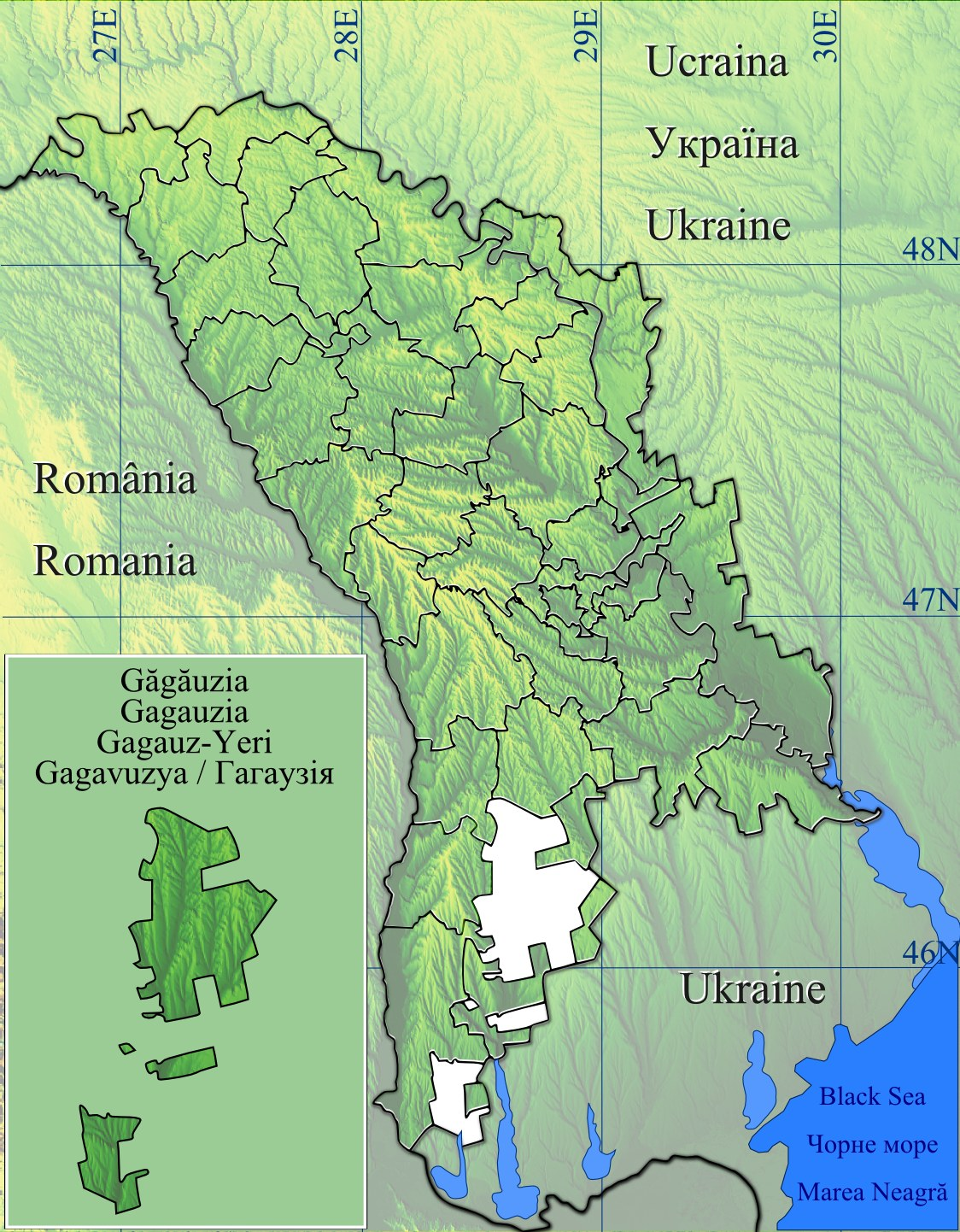
- Location of Svetlîi in Moldova
- Coordinates: 46°00′59″N 28°33′58″E
- Country: Moldova
- Autonomous Region: Gagauzia
- Founded: 1913

Government
  - Mayor: Ivan Marchenko

Population (2024)
  - Total: 1,278

Ethnicity (2024 census)
  - Gagauz people: 36.07%
  - Bulgarians: 21.67%
  - Moldovans: 20.89%
  - other: 21.37%
- Time zone: UTC+2 (EET)
- Climate: Cfb
- Website: primaria-svetlii.md

Svetlîi (Gagauz: Svetlıy), formerly known as Denevița Nouă (German: Neu-Dennewitz) is a village in the Comrat district, Gagauz Autonomous Territorial Unit of the Republic of Moldova. According to the 2024 Moldovan census the village has 1,278 people.

== History ==
=== Founding ===
The settlement was originally founded as the German daughter colony of Neu-Dennewitz in 1913, part of the Albota parish. The settlers consisted mostly of protestants from the village of Dennewitz in Prussia. The addition of the Neu- was added to the name to distinguish it from another settlement south with the same name, present day Pryamobalka, Ukraine.

The first group of 21 settlers bought land from 25 to 50 acres each from the wealthy landowners Alfred Schlenger and the widow of Julia Schponer, whose lands were located on the right bank of the Ialpug River. The first founders of the village were:

- Immanuel Schottle,
- Daniel Scheible,
- Freidrich Heer,
- Christian Hofel,
- Georg Schiwa,
- Johann Seitz,
- Heinrich Muller,
- Christian Getz,
- Johann Weestz,
- Adam Kohlbach et al.

The Germans built large houses, designed for 2 to 3 families. The houses were made of burnt bricks and covered with red tiles. Today, only two such houses have been preserved in Svetlîi.

The favorable climatic conditions of the south of Bessarabia and the richest, fertile soil determined the economic activities of the German colonists: farming (viticulture, melon growing, growing winter crops, sunflower, flax, hemp) and cattle breeding (cattle, sheep).

=== WWI, revolution and interwar period ===
The outbreak of war brought great hardship to the village. Around 6 men were mobilized and supplies were confiscated, incidents of robberies and extortion were also reported. During the Revolution, banditry became more commonplace, with many people fleeing to the neighboring Sofijewka. People only returned after Romanian rule was established in Neu-Dennewitz (Romanian: Denevița Nouă).

In 1923 a dedicated prayer house was built and dedicated by Senior Pastor Daniel Haase on November 4. Prior to this a small house which was included in the initial land purchase was used.

September 28, 1939, an agreement was reached between Nazi Germany and the Soviet Union for a population exchange. Before the Soviet occupation of Bessarabia, in 1939 the village had a population of 175. In 1940 majority of Bessarabian Germans, around 93 thousand were relocated to Germany, this operation was generally carried out by the Schutzstaffel.

=== Soviet period ===
Following with the restoration of Soviet power in the village of Denevița Nouă, a village council was created, which consisted of the above points of the Congaz district, and a motor-tractor station was established, in Alexeevca village - collective farm "28 June". The village council, motor-tractor station, and collective farm were liquidated with the start of World War II. In October 1944, after the re-entry of the territory of modern Moldova in the USSR, the Denevița state farm was established on the basis of the former collective farm "28 June" in the village. It was entered by residents of the settlements of Denevița, Alexeevca and Corten Nou, including the former workers of the collective farm “28 June”.

By the Decree of the Presidium of the Supreme Council of the MSSR dated July 3, 1950, No. 5502, the village of Denevița Nouă / Novaia Denevița was renamed the village of Svetlîi.

The history of Svetlîi settlement is closely connected with the history of the state farms "Cealîc", "Denevița", the collective farm "28 June", and with settlements Alexeevca, Corten Nou, Samurza and Cealîc. These villages for a long time were in the administrative subordination of the village council Denevița. In 1954, the state farms "Denevița" and "Cealîc" merged into one farm, the state farm "Cealîc".

From the beginning of the 1960s to the mid-1990s, entire neighborhoods of individual residential houses were built in Svetlîi for the specialists of the state farm technical school. As a result of the construction and development of settlements, the village of Svetlîi and the neighboring village of Corten Nou had unofficially merged into one settlement. In 1969, a three-storey high school building for 960 places and school workshops were commissioned. In 1982, the Palace of Culture was opened for 750 people. In 1972, the administrative building of the village council, consumer services house, and veterinary clinic were built. In 1986, a kindergarten was built with 200 places.

=== After independence ===
In connection with the renaming of the state farm-technical school in 1992 into an agrarian-technical college, in the following years the state farm ceased to exist. In carrying out the program "Pământ" all fixed assets and land farms were privatized. On the basis of the former farm, LLC Mekagronomiya Plus was established.

On March 5, 1995, at a national referendum was held on joining the autonomous territorial unit of Gagauzia, residents of the villages of Svetlîi and Alexeevca voted for entering the new entity. The village of Corten Nou, which at one time was part of the administrative subordination of the mayor's office of Svetlîi, remained under the administrative subordination of the Taraclia district. With the passage of time, the former village of Corten Nou, inhabited by ethnic Bulgarians, became one of the streets of the village of Svetlîi and was named after Georgi Dimitrov, but now it is again a separate village in the Taraclia district.

== Demographics ==
According to the 2024 Moldovan census the commune has 1,278 people inhabitants, a 21.21% decrease from the previous census in 2014, when 1,622 inhabitants were registered.

Ethnic composition of Svetlîi (2024)
Ethnic group	Population	% Percentage
Gagauz	461	36.07%
Bulgarians	277	21.67%
Moldovans (Note: There is an ongoing controversy regarding the ethnic identification of Moldovans and Romanians.)	267	20.89%
Ukrainians	131	10.25%
Russians	103	8.05%
Others	39	3.07%
Total	1,278	100%

== Notable people ==
- Sakhat Dursunov (born 1977), Moldovan director

== See also ==
- Bessarabia Germans
