= Vasile Stati =

Moldovan politician and historian (born 1939)

Vasile Stati OR

Member of the Moldovan Parliament
- In office 27 February 1994 – 20 March 2001
- Parliamentary group: Democratic Agrarian Party; Party of Communists

Personal details
- Born: September 20, 1939 (age 86) Cajba, Moldavian SSR, Soviet Union
- Profession: Historian, Politician

Vasile Stati (Cyrillic: Василе Стати, also known by his full Soviet-style name Vasily Nikolaevich Stati; born 20 September 1939) is a Moldovan politician and historian.

== Biography ==
He studied history and philology at the Moldovan language Department of the State University of Chișinău.

He is the author of numerous publications on the history of Moldova and the Moldovan language. Stati wrote the monographs Moldovenii de la est de Nistru ("The Moldavians to the east of the Dniester") and Istoria Moldovei ("History of Moldova"). He has written about the development of the vernacular Moldavian language and the Slavic influences over the Moldavian culture. In the 1980s, he worked at the Institute of Linguistics and Literature of the Academy of Sciences of Moldova, and from 1994 to 2001 he was a member of the Parliament of Moldova. Until 2005 he was the secretary of the informational-analytic centre of the Moldovan Parliament.

He considers the Moldovan language to be separate from the Romanian language. In 2003 he published the first Moldovan–Romanian dictionary, which caused a wave of criticism from the Romanian and Moldovan scientific and political circles, as contrary to the dominant current paradigm of the unity of the two languages. It contained a foreword whose purpose was to prove that the Moldovan language is distinct from Romanian. The linguists of the Romanian Academy declared that Stati's "Moldovan" words are also Romanian words, while Ion Bărbuță, the head of the Institute of Linguistics of the Republic of Moldova, described the dictionary as being an "absurdity, serving political goals".

== See also ==
- History of the Moldovan language
