= Balabanu =

Balabanu Балабану
- Village
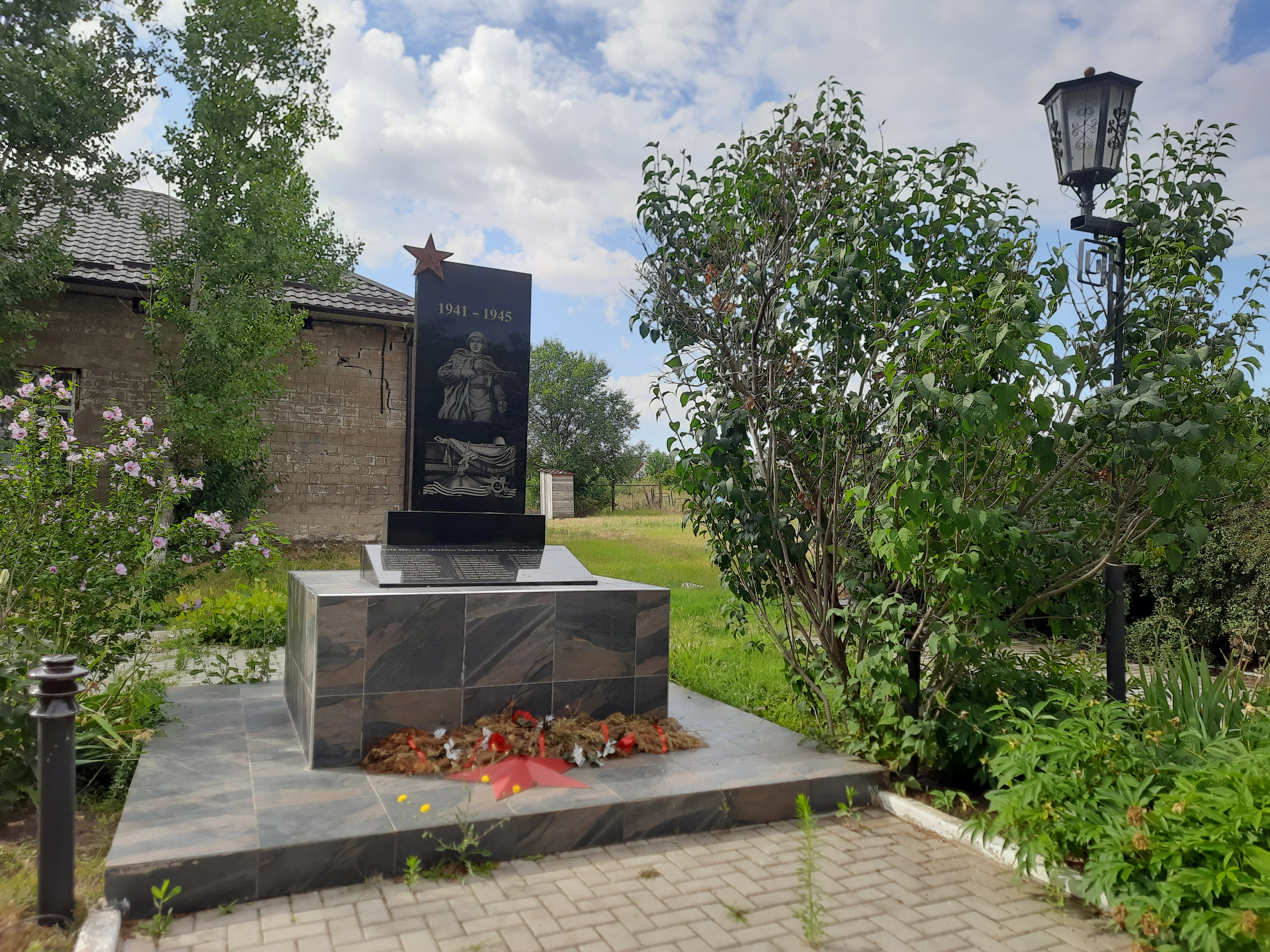
- World War II memorial in Balabanu

- Location of Balabanu in Moldova
- Coordinates: 45.933°N 28.566°E
- Country: Moldova
- District: Taraclia District
- Founded: 1809

Government
  - Mayor: Nicolae Munteanu

Area
  - Total: 0.73 km^{2} (0.28 sq mi)

Population (2024)
  - Total: 604
  - Density: 830/km^{2} (2,100/sq mi)

Ethnicity (2024 census)
  - Moldovans: 57.0%
  - Bulgarians: 27.0%
  - other: 16.0%
- Time zone: UTC+2 (EET)
  - Summer (DST): UTC+3 (EEST)
- Climate: Cfb

Balabanu (Bulgarian: Балабану) is a village in Taraclia District, Moldova. According to the 2024 Moldovan census the village has 604 people, 344 (57.0%) of them being Moldovans, 163 (27.0%) Bulgarians and 71 (11.8%) Gagauz people.

== History ==
Settlement in the present-day village dates back to the Bronze Age. Fragments of ceramics and signs of settlement have been found during excavations, showing signs of settlement. Burial mounds unearthed show remains after the invasion of the Scythians in the area. Greek jewelry made using Etruscan jewelry techniques, woven from tubes, decorated with a gold scan and grain have also been discovered in the proximity of the village.

The first official documentation mentioning the village of Balaban is dated to 1809. The 1875 census registered counted around 667 inhabitants in the village.

In 1920 a German colony Balaban was founded in the area, part of the Albota evangelical parish and having around 775 hectares of land in total. In 1930, there were around 322 people living in the village, by 1939 this dropped to 126.

On February 5, 1986 the village of Balabanu was separated from the Novosiolovca village council.
