= Salcia, Taraclia =

Salcia Салчия
- Commune
- Location of Salcia in Moldova
- Coordinates: 45.866°N 28.516°E
- Country: Moldova
- District: Taraclia District

Government
  - Mayor: Valentina Trifonoglo

Population (2024)
  - Total: 182

Ethnicity (2024 census)
  - Gagauz people: 55.5%
  - Bulgarians: 23.1%
  - other: 21.4%
- Time zone: UTC+2 (EET)
  - Summer (DST): UTC+3 (EEST)
- Climate: Cfb

Salcia (Bulgarian: Салчия) is a commune and village in Taraclia District, Moldova. According to the 2024 Moldovan census the village has 182 people, 101 (55.5%) of them being Gagauz people, 42 (23.1%) Bulgarians, 26 (14.3%) Moldovans.

The commune is composed of the following villages:

- Salcia (Bulgarian: Салчия)
- Orehovca (Bulgarian: Ореховка), until 1965 Bisericuța (Russian: Бисерикуца)

== Valea Nucilor ==
Bisericuta-de Jos (German: Nußtal, Nusstal, Russian: Бисеоикуча-Нижняя) or Bisericuta-de Jos was a German colony between approximately between the area of Salcia and Orehovca. The settlement was founded as a protestant daughter colony in 1925. It was a part of the Albota evangelical parish, with around 143 hectares of land. In 1939 it had a population of 30, many having been evacuated to Germany.

== Demographics ==
According to the 2024 census, 182 inhabitants lived in the commune of Salcia, a decrease compared to the previous census in 2014, when 293 inhabitants were registered.

Ethnic composition of Salcia commune (2024)
Ethnic group	Population	% Percentage
Gagauz	101	55.5%
Bulgarians	42	23.1%
Moldovans	26	14.3%
Romanians	1	0.5%
Ukrainians	6	3.3%
Russians	4	2.2%
Others	2	1.1%
Total	182	100%
