= Cealîc =

Cealîc Чалик
- Commune
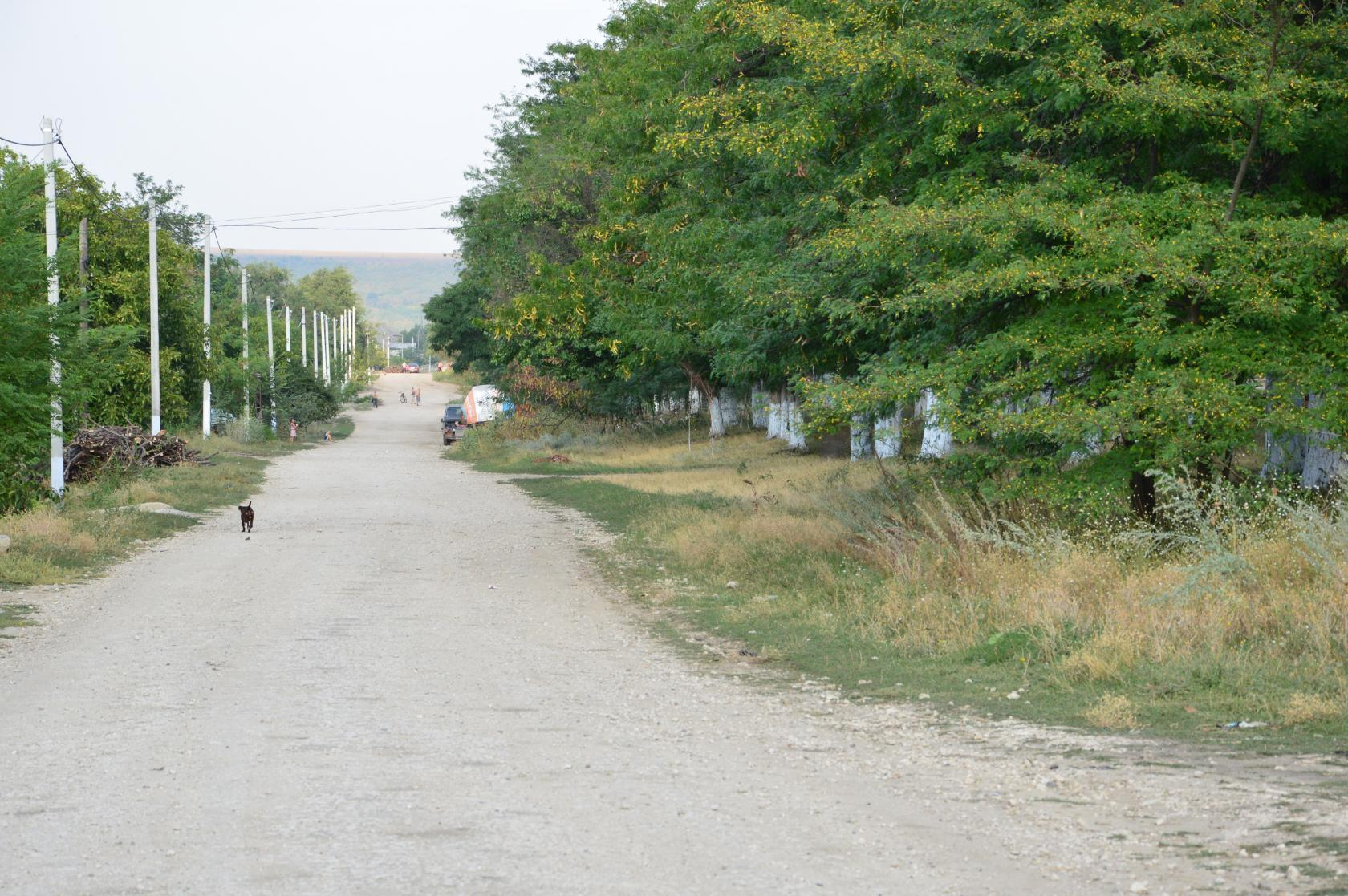
- Cealîc in 2016

- Location of Cealîc in Moldova
- Coordinates: 46.0°N 28.55°E
- Country: Moldova
- District: Taraclia District

Government
  - Mayor: Ilia Anghelcev

Area
  - Total: 1.7 km^{2} (0.66 sq mi)

Population (2024)
  - Total: 633
  - Density: 370/km^{2} (960/sq mi)

Ethnicity (2024 census)
  - Gagauz people: 40.0%
  - Moldovans: 23.9%
  - other: 36.1%
- Time zone: UTC+2 (EET)
  - Summer (DST): UTC+3 (EEST)
- Climate: Cfb

Cealîc (Bulgarian: Чалик) is a commune and village in Taraclia District, Moldova. According to the 2024 Moldovan census the village has 633 people, 253 (40%) of them being Gagauz people, 151 (23.9%) Moldovans, 127 (20.1%) Bulgarians.

The commune is composed of the following villages:

- Cealîc (Bulgarian: Чалик)
- Samurza (Bulgarian: Самурза)
- Cortenul Nou (Bulgarian: Нови Кортен)

== History ==
=== Samurza ===
Samurza (Bulgarian: Самурза) is the oldest settlement in the commune, it was established in 1810 by Bulgarian refugees from the Ottoman Empire. In 1922 each family in the area was sold 50 hectares per family. Most of the large farms were nationalized in 1949.

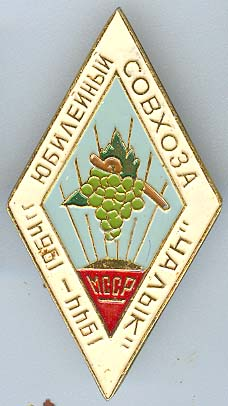
Cealîc Soviet medal for viticulture

=== Cealîc ===
The village of Cealîc was founded in 1913, it is thought the etymology is of Tatar origin. In the first half of the 20th century the area together with Svetlîi, was a united village called Mârzen which was founded by German colonists. Neighboring Gagauz people who occasionally worked for the Germans built small housing in the village of Cealîc, which were later used by deported and rehabilitated families from Altai, Kazakhstan and Siberia. The Cealîc village council was formed in July 17, 1981, initially just including Cealîc and Samurza.

=== Cortenul Nou ===
Cortenul Nou (Bulgarian: Нови Кортен) is the smallest and newest village in the commune, around 0.67 km². Prior to the Moldovan administrative reform in 1994 it was part of the Svetlîi commune. On March 5, 1995 the villages of Svetlîi and Alexeevca voted in favor of joining Gagauzia while Cortenul Nou did not. Today it is a small enclave surrounded by the village of Svetlîi.

== Demographics ==
According to the 2024 census, 633 inhabitants lived in the commune of Cealîc, a decrease compared to the previous census in 2014, when 857 inhabitants were registered.

Ethnic composition of Cealîc commune (2024)
Ethnic group	Population	% Percentage
Gagauz	253	40.0%
Moldovans	151	23.9%
Romanians	7	1.1%
Bulgarians	127	20.1%
Ukrainians	53	8.4%
Russians	33	5.2%
Others	9	1.4%
Total	633	100%

== See also ==
- Svetlîi
