= William Thomas Thornton =

English economist, civil servant and author(1813–1880)

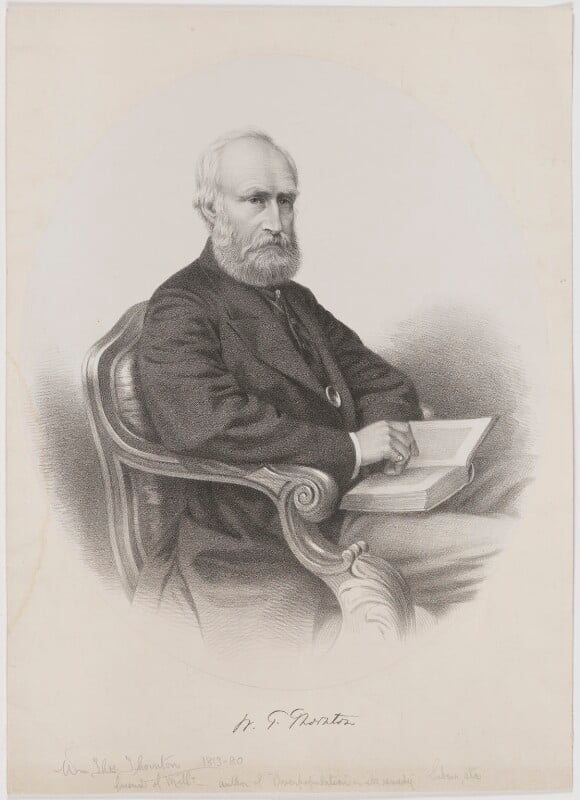
- Lithograph of William Thomas Thornton, circa 1870-1880
- Born: February 14, 1813; Burnham, Buckinghamshire
- Died: June 17, 1880 (aged 67); Cadogan Place
- Occupations: Economist, civil servant, author
- Father: Thomas Thornton

William Thomas Thornton, CB (14 February 1813 – 17 June 1880) was an English economist, civil servant and author.

== Life ==
Thornton was born at Burnham, Buckinghamshire on 14 February 1813, the son of the merchant Thomas Thornton and Sophie Zohrab; she was the daughter of a Persian merchant, Paul Zohrab, who had settled in Turkey. Thornton's father was heavily involved in international commerce from a young age. He had lived in Constantinople and its surrounding region for many years in pursuit of British mercantile interests. His father was also well known for his book, titled Turkey Past and Present (1807), a work that described in great detail the social, political, and military institutions of the Ottoman Empire.

Thornton was educated at the Moravian settlement at Ockbrook in Derbyshire and spent three years in Malta with his cousin, Sir William Henry Thornton, an auditor general for Malta. From 1830 to 1835, Thornton lived abroad in Constantinople with Consul-General Cartwright.

He was the youngest of eight children, with his father dying in 1814. He was subsequently raised by his father's family, predominantly by his aunt Elizabeth Moore.

=== Career ===
==== Clerkship ====
In August 1836, after having work experience abroad with relatives, Thornton obtained a clerkship in the East India House at its Leadenhall Street headquarters, London. According to his own account, Thornton was swayed towards the East India Company by a personal encounter with the then-chairman of the company, Sir James Carnac.

In December 1837, he was transferred to the marine branch of the secretary's office. This allowed him to have more time to focus on his other pursuits, particularly his economic studies and work. The position had reportedly become vacant due to the untimely death of John Stuart Mill's father, James Mill.

According to Thornton's obituary of Mill, Mill was largely responsible for Thornton's appointment to his father's old position:

The death of Mr. Mill senior, in 1836, had occasioned a vacancy at the bottom of the examiner's office, to which I was appointed through the kindness of Sir James Carnac, then chairman of the company, in whose gift it was. Within a few months, however, I was transferred to a newly created [marine] branch of the secretary office.

Thornton continued to elaborate about his position as a clerk in the examiner's office and compared it with that of Mill's experiences at the East India Company:

According to the ordinary course of things in those days, the newly-appointed junior would have had nothing to do, except a little abstracting, indexing, and researching, or pretending to search, into records; but young Mill was almost immediately set to indite despatches to the governments of the three Indian Presidencies, on what, in India House phraseology, were distinguished as "political" subjects—subjects, that is, for the most part growing out of the relations of the said governments with 'native' states of foreign potentates. This continued to be his business almost to the last.

Records show that Thornton did not draft any dispatches in his early career, or if did, he did not sign off or initial any at the office. It's probable that his early work at the examiner's office consisted of the more menial tasks, mostly administrative and clerical work, like retrieving correspondence, writing précis and filing documents.

==== Senior administrator at examiner's office ====
In 1838, after moving to the marine branch of the examiner's office, Thornton went from an un-salaried probationary period with an 80-pound-a-year stipend to earning an annual income of 500 pounds a year. By 1839, Thornton was doing well enough financially that the East India Company had him contribute into the Widows' Fund, a pension plan set up by the company to financially help widows of employees whom had died, through a compulsory contribution that was required for higher-up employees. In 1842, he began to pay income taxes. In 1856, he was appointed the assistant examiner in the Examiner's Office. In 1858, he attained the position of senior administrator of the secretary of the India House's Department of Public Works. He received a raise in salary for both promotions. As assistant examiner, he had received a raise from 600 pounds per year to 900 pounds per year, and as the senior administrator at the Department of Public Works, he received a raise to 1200 pounds per year. He would continue receiving modest raises every few years throughout his career. Eventually, with his career as a mandarin at the East India Company, he was able to purchase a property of upper-middle class means in London, where he would live out the rest of his days.

From 1848 to 1856, the Governor General of India was Lord Dalhousie. His term marked a time where Thornton was able to claim multiple professional exploits in his work at India House Department of Public Works. Dalhousie greatly believed in governmental infrastructure development, and believed that it was an immensely important tool of economic progress for society. The jobs that Dalhousie commissioned and Thornton had a hand in were mainly projects for infrastructure development, including postal improvements, telegraph and cable services, and the introduction of scientific education programs. The latter was believed to be helpful for people to appreciate and use other technological advances from around the world.

Thornton's duty as the assistant examiner was mostly to prepare draft dispatches and any policy documents that regarded the East India Company's public works activities. The documents dealt with the construction of railways and roads, canals, bridges, and irrigation apparatuses in Burma, India, and the Straits Settlement. The documents were first circulated throughout the India Office, then sent to the central administration in India. However, before the dispatches could be sent to India they had to be approved by both the court of directors for the company and then by the board of control, the representative of the authority of parliament. The chief examiner and his senior assistants had a large influence on the content of the dispatches.

Dispatches and minute papers that Thornton had to draft were composed on average 10 times per year. However, in the years 1856-1861 and 1870–1872, Thornton authored a significantly higher than average number of dispatches; most notably, in the years 1860 and 1861, Thornton composed eighty-eight and seventy, respectively. Since 1856, it is evident – due to the large increase of Thornton signatures and handwriting in the minute papers and dispatches – that his responsibilities had increased at the Department of Public Works. The content in dispatches and then later minute papers ranged from one- or two-page documents of confirmations of store deliveries, and extensions for public service appointments, and a letter of acknowledgment, to hefty fifty-page documents concerned with serious policy issues such as trade, defence and public infrastructure.

Thornton wrote dispatches for the construction of the Rangoon-Prome trunk road, which still exists today. He composed a dispatch for Singapore's southern defenses in order to protect the British garrison in the imperative water lanes of Indo-China. Thornton also composed dispatches that concerned public works for the Bombay, Madras, Bengal presidencies.

== Published works ==
=== Over-population and its Remedy ===
In 1845, Thornton published his first economic work, Over-population and its Remedy, which focused on the colonization of Irish wastes, and the Irish peasantry. Thornton downplayed the importance of emigration and disapproved of state interference, but encouraged subdivision of the land. In this work, Thornton refers to and praises Mill's work Principles of Political Economy, and contests the views of John Ramsay McCulloch, most notably, the validity of comparisons of prosperity between the medieval and modern laboring classes. In a January 1847 issue of the Edinburgh Review, Thornton's arguments against that comparison were largely criticized.

The work is generally seen as anti-Malthusian. Thornton argued that Robert Malthus had "overlooked and undervalued the tendency which the possession of property has to engender prudence, and seems, indeed, to have thought that the quality is rarely to be found among members of the laboring class, except under the pressure of misery." He posited that there was a "low-level trap" for the laboring class in the economical development of society: that the realities of life for the impoverished were too much to allow them to focus on any real prospect of prosperity. Thornton also cited competition; workers "are too numerous to earn a competent subsistence for themselves and their families, competition takes place amongst them: each, in his anxiety to obtain employment, offers to accept lower wages than he requires for his comfortable maintenance... Neither has this state any tendency to correct itself. Whatever point populations that may attain, it can with equal ease at least maintain itself there."

Thornton elaborated on his explanation:

"A labourer, offering his services for hire is simply offering labour for sale. No one is bound to accept the offer. No one is under any obligation to buy nor a fortiori to buy at any particular price. There is, therefore, no particular price to which the labourer has a right, or by not obtaining which he can be wronged. No price can be proposed either to him or by him, which can be one whit more fair or just than any other price. Any price is just which he agrees to take, and another to give, and this, and not one tittle more than this, constitutes his due."

Thornton argued against the reasoning that if the poor were lifted out of poverty they would just become lazy and feckless, with the belief that sudden lifting out of poverty would foster the behaviour necessary to maintain prosperity. He believed that simply owning property and holding other responsibilities would encourage prudence and sound-mindedness. During a period when economic discussion was focused on the wages fund doctrine, Thornton saw that wages were determined by the ratio between the "fund" and the population of laborers in the market, but he contested the stance that the denominator complied with the simple stories of "immiseration" (economical impoverishment).

=== On the Poor Laws ===
By 1846, Thornton naturally had strong opinions about the Poor Laws of England, and had published his comments on them:

"It cannot be denied that in this instance the rate of wages was in part determined by the price of provisions, but this can only happen where the circumstance which naturally regulate the price of labour are arbitrarily interfered with. When the money price of labour is suffered to adjust itself according to the proportions the supply and the demand, it will remain unaffected by any variations in the price of provision or of other commodities."

=== A Plea for Peasant Proprietors, with the Outlines of a Plan for their Establishment in Ireland ===
Thornton displayed his more developed economic and political views in his next work, A Plea for Peasant Proprietors, with the Outlines of a Plan for their Establishment in Ireland, published in 1848. Mill was given proofs of Thornton's latest work as a courtesy to a friend and it was released a few weeks before his own Political Economy, which contained influences from Thornton's latest work. By 1874, the work had long been out of print, however, due to the new passing of the Irish Land Act of 1870, Thornton's work resurfaced as newly relevant and was reprinted. It was published with two additional chapters, the "Social and Moral Effects of Peasant Proprietorship", and "Ireland: a Forecast from 1873". Thornton believed that, ideally, the nationalism of the Irish lands would have been most profitable and that slowing down private proprietorship would be a necessary evil.

=== On Labour ===
In 1869, Thornton released his first work in the field of economics since he had left the Political Economic Club. On Labour, its Wrongful Claims and Rightful Dues; its Actual Present and Possible Future was considered his comeback work. The book was reviewed twice in The Fortnightly Review by John Stuart Mill. He considered it in a sympathetic manner, considering that the views expressed in the book were largely at odds with Mill's own. It is believed that Thornton's personal relationship with Mill, and Mill's desire to encourage his friend to re-enter into the fray of the economic field, are what made him write two reviews on Thornton's book.

Mill's review of On Labour was itself reviewed by an editor from the Macmillan Company, and this second-order review asserted that Mill was fully aware the book would stir controversy:

"I have thought about the Thornton book. The following considerations sum to the point.

Mill's testimonial could not very well be made known on the surface of the book. Even if It could, just now it would not be so very effective, though it might become so. Thornton's book is not of the size or caliber to be a standard work or text-book. It has already been published in the Fortnightly Review, and the students of economic questions who would otherwise have bought it are now familiar with it.

On the other hand is the very weighty fact that the subject will shortly be the subject of the day – and will probably continue so for considerable time to come; and everything bearing on it will be brought. And Thornton is an authority in economics, as the author of the "Plea for Peasant Proprietors." It will be a risk, decidedly, I think – though the book is one which would look well in your list."

Other reviews and receptions of "On Labour" were made public in the months to come. Cairnes said he believed that On Labour is the kind of "earth-shattering fissure that rocks the world of political economy."

On Labour was poorly reviewed as an inaccurate piece by the famed German economist and intellectual Lujo Brentano. Brentano testified in his essay "On Gilds and Trades Unions" that Thornton's chapter on the origins of trade unions was "unhistorical".

Thornton's second edition of On Labour included a new, supplementary chapter in which he describes cooperation as "destined to beget, at however remote a date, a healthy socialism as superior to itself in all its best attributes as itself is to its parent." Thornton also continued with a forewarning that the period of gestation "must not be violently shortened".

In 1870, On Labour was translated into German and published by Heinrich Schramm. In 1894, Richard Burdinski translated and released Die Produktiv-Genossenschaft als Regenerationsmittel des Arbeiterstandes. Eine Kritik der Thornton-Lassalleschen Wirtschaftsreform.

=== Indian Public Works ===
In 1875, Thornton would return to his first and favourite love – in the realm of economics – with land tenure systems heading the fray of his arguments. Accompanying his newest arguments were irrigation and multiple "artifacts" of "bureaucratic levers of control and economic development". The final work was a book titled Indian Public Works and Cognate Indian Topics. The book also covered India's controversies over the railway development across the country, the ship canals, and telegraph wires that ranged from cities to cities. It was also a huge endorsement and call for a public educational establishment that would be the foundation of a prosperous Indian commercial market and in turn would provide the "infrastructure in which markets operate." In addition to these then contemporary Indian issues, Thornton explained his own experiences and problems at India House, and provided solutions. His explanation for publicly funded projects to develop India's infrastructure, versus a private investor's solution, was that "among its virtues, it surveys the late classical case for the legitimate undertaking of public works, suggesting that market rates of return may be inadequate guide for choice of projects in poorer or less developed countries: there, the second-round of effects of drawing out 'idle capital' might more than offset the costs of what initially appear to be unpromising projects."

In Indian Public Works, Thornton continued his argument against an idea that was in debate during the time: the call for private investment to aid the Indian government to develop its railroad infrastructure, and the idea that the investors' return would be guaranteed. This called the "Dalhousie Plan", and Thornton claimed that it would generate a "cost per-mile far above that experienced in direct government construction." In Indian Public Works, Thornton recommended that the Indian government should weigh their options of multiple and varying "cooperative schemes to deal with problems of motivating and supervising labor".

=== "Irrigations regarded as a Preventive of Indian Famines" ===
On 22 February 1878 Thornton delivered a speech of his last publication, a paper titled "Irrigations regarded as a Preventive of Indian Famines". Thornton read his paper before the Society of Arts.

=== Non-economics works ===
==== Old-fashioned Ethics and Common-sense Metaphysics ====
In 1873, Thornton's Old-fashioned Ethics and Common-sense Metaphysics was published. This work pursued intellectual topics other than economics. The volume consisted of a number of essays that harshly criticized the views and opinions of multiple respected philosophers and intellectuals. David Hume was exhorted, along with Thomas Henry Huxley and the Utilitarian movement as a whole.

==== Literature and poems ====
In 1854, Thornton wrote a poem titled "The Siege of Silistria" and it was published within the year. He continued to write poetry and conceived a volume of verse titled Modern Manichaeism, Labour's Utopia, and other Poems, published in 1857. In 1878, Thornton's translation of "Word for Word From Horace" was published, which was a literal verse translation of Horace's Odes.

== Relationship with Mill ==
Thornton's relationship with John Stuart Mill is considered to be a truly unique one, considering that they were so often at odds in most arguments. However, their common workplace and passions for economics and philosophy – and the incessant discussions of these, sometimes, intertwining topics – made them great friends. According to Thornton's memoir, although he could recognize Mill by sight around the India House, he had no real occasion to converse with Mill until, in 1846, he sent him a copy of his Over-population:

"A day or two after he came into my room to thank me for it; and during the half-hour's conversation that thereupon ensued, sprang up, full grown at birth, an intimate friendship, of which I feel that I am not unduly boasting in declaring it to have been equally sincere and fervent on both sides. From that time for the next ten to twelve years, a day seldom passed without, if I did not go into his room, his coming into mine, often telling me as he entered that he had nothing particular to say; but that, having a few minutes to spare, he thought he might as well have a little talk."

Their relationship was of high mutual respect. The relationship not only profited them on a personal level but also in their careers as intellectuals; Thornton's eulogy to Mill said their "working relationship developed into a close friendship that was enriched by discussions of many philosophical, intellectual, and economic issues."

It believed that Thornton owed his intellectual standing in society in part to his friendship with Mill. For instance, in 1850, Mill wrote a published letter to the editor of the Westminster Review, naming Thornton as a contributor to the work and arguments as a whole. Mill extolled Thornton's virtues as both a man and an intellectual to multiple sources, including in a letter sent to John Elliott Cairnes, referencing Thornton as "a person that I particularly like and respect".

In 1867, Mill wrote a letter to Thornton about Thornton's newest work:

"I have just finished your chapter in the Fortnightly and I put down my observations while my mind is full of its contents. In execution I think it excellent and of good augury for the success of the book... I expect that the subsequent chapters will be equally well executed and that I shall come to agree with all or most of your practical conclusions. But in its principles the chapter does not carry me with it. I find in it what I always find where a standard is assumed of so-called justice distinct from general utility... not only do I not admit of any standard of right which does not derive its sole authority from utility, but I remark that in such cases an adversary could always find some other maxim of justice equal in authority but leading to opposite conclusions... I have stated strongly the fault I find with your chapter. It would take me a considerable space to set out all the good I find in it. To mention only one thing, the will be very serviceable in carrying on what may be called the emancipation of political economy--its liberation from the kind of doctrines of the old school (now taken up by well to do people) which treat what they call economical laws, supply and demand for instance, as if they were laws of inanimate matter, not amendable to the will of the human beings from whose feelings, interests, and principles of action they proceed. This is one of the queer mental confusions which will be wondered at by and by and you are helping very much in the good work of cleaning it up."

This shows that even though they were at odds in economic and political opinions and philosophy, Mills still found a way to be supportive of Thornton's work, not only in an encouraging manner but also on a fundamental economic fundamental level as well. Mill was able to deliver both a public and personally endorsement for Thornton's On Labour without compromising his own beliefs; Mill believed that "the political objectives were fundamentally sound", and that "the need for synoptic text treating the theory of unionism was imminent."

== Unpopularity among contemporaries ==
Thornton, throughout his career, struggled to gain respect and recognition for his arguments. Much of the economic community of the time condemned his positions in the field. Comments have been gathered from the Political Economic Club to support this conclusion, including one notable excerpt from Leslie Stephen:

"I am suffering the torments of the damned from that God-forgotten Thornton, who is boring on about supply and demand... He is not a bad fellow, but just now I hate him like poison."

Another notable criticism of Thornton came in a letter from L.H. Courtney addressed to Sir Louis Mallet:

"Dear Mallet, I share your regrets at the apparent decline in decorum at the Political Economic Club. Last Friday the breaches of manners were sadly conspicuous. One officer must not find fault with another, but the truth is that our treasurer is habitually too contemptuous of view other than his own--not infrequently wider than his own--and this characteristic does not abate as the years pass. With his rough disdain and Thornton's tendency to querulous irritability there must be occasional splutterings, and the only way of keeping them down is for you and other members to attend as often as convenient discountenance them by quietly maintaining the rules of debate."

Sir J. Macdonnel labelled Thornton a "disruptive revolutionary influence" but a "useful solvent [who] had the art of putting questions disconcerting to the Dogmatic Spirit, and he had a vision, temperate of a world that was to come – more questions than he himself could answer."

Thornton took an eight-year hiatus from the Political Economy Club; it is easy to presume that this hiatus was due to his being disliked. During this time, Thornton wrote a poem, addressed to John Stuart Mill, that expresses his disaffection with political economy:

"Dear Mill, whose friendship kindly emphasis
Approved my first work, and encouraged this.
Scarce will you ask, why, from old studies turned,
My name unknown, a pension yet unearned.
Problems abstruse and tough, no more I try,
Of dark Political Economy.
Digging no more in serious dissertation
To trace the source of 'Over-population,'
Nor publishing what hidden treasure lies
Deep in the soil of 'Peasant Properties.'"

Poetry was universally regarded as not Thornton's forte; however, this particular poem gives some insight into the intellectual turmoil that he was enduring. Thornton was callously criticized for a work of translation he had published on poems written by Horace; the critic, Professor Robinson Ellis, harshly commented that Thornton had a "deficient ear and a wanting for metrical grasp." The critic continued with a backhanded compliment, saying that Thornton had a "seventeenth-century quaintness" to his style. It was apparent that Thornton would not leave an intellectual impact on the world through his poetry.

== Later life and death ==
Thornton lived out the last years of his life in Cadogan Place near Sloane Street. With pleasure he received the respect and company of his old colleagues from India House. In 1878, he translated a classical piece of Roman literature that was published, a volume titled Word for Word from Horace. Based on Thornton's personal estate of eight thousand pounds, accounted for after his death, he lived the comfortable middle-class life of a bureaucrat at mid-rank.

Thornton died at his home in Cadogan Place on 17 June 1880.
