= Doina, Cahul =

Doina Aykendorf, Eichendorf
- Commune
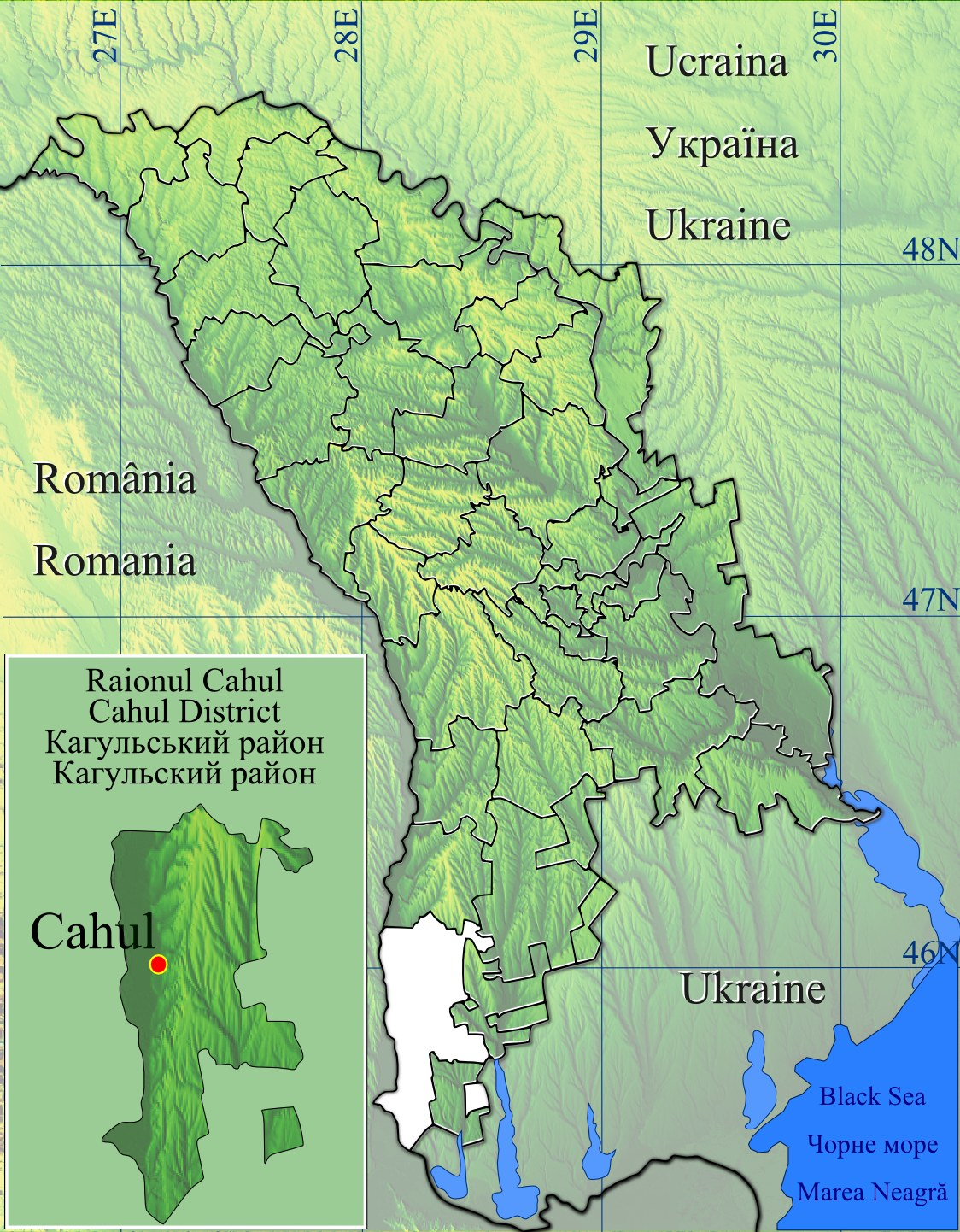
- Location within Cahul
- Coordinates: 46°6′44″N 28°19′45″E
- Country: Moldova
- District: Doina

Population (2014)
  - Total: 1,521
- Time zone: UTC+2 (EET)
  - Summer (DST): UTC+3 (EEST)
- Postal code: MD-7323

Doina is a commune in Cahul District, Moldova. It is composed of three villages: Doina, Iasnaia Poleana and Rumeanțev.
