= Moldovan language =

One of two names for the Romanian language in Moldova

Moldovan
- Moldavian
- limba moldovenească; лимба молдовеняскэ
- Pronunciation: [ˈlimba moldoveˈne̯askə]
- Ethnicity: Moldovans
- Language family: Indo-European: Italic; Latino-Faliscan; Latin; Romance; Eastern Romance; Romanian; Moldavian dialect; Moldovan
- Writing system: Moldovan Cyrillic

Official status
- Official language in: Transnistria

Language codes
- ISO 639-1: mo (deprecated)
- ISO 639-2: mol (deprecated)
- ISO 639-3: mol (deprecated)

Moldovan or Moldavian (Latin alphabet: limba moldovenească, Cyrillic alphabet: лимба молдовеняскэ) is one of the two local names for the Romanian language in Moldova.

Moldovan was declared the official language of Moldova in Article 13 of the constitution adopted in 1994, whereas the 1991 Declaration of Independence of Moldova had used the name Romanian. In 2003, the Moldovan parliament adopted a law defining Moldovan and Romanian as glottonyms for the same language. In 2013, the Constitutional Court of Moldova ruled that the Declaration of Independence takes precedence over Article 13 of the constitution, thereby giving official status to the name Romanian. In March 2023, the Moldovan parliament approved a law on referring to the national language as Romanian in all legislative texts and in the constitution; President Maia Sandu promulgated it later that month.

Outside Moldova’s government-controlled territory, the breakaway region of Transnistria continues to recognize "Moldovan" as one of its official languages, alongside Russian and Ukrainian. Ukraine also recognized "Moldovan" as a minority language until June 2026, when a law removing it from the list of languages protected under the European Charter for Regional or Minority Languages took effect.

The language of the Moldovans had for centuries been interchangeably identified by both terms, but during the time of the Soviet Union, Moldovan, or as it was called in English at the time, Moldavian, was the only term officially recognized. Its resolution declared Moldavian a Romance language distinct from Romanian.

While a majority of Moldovans with higher education, as well as a majority of inhabitants of the capital city of Chișinău, call their language Romanian, most rural residents indicated Moldovan as their native language in the 2004 census. In schools in Moldova, the term "Romanian language" has been used since independence.

The variety of Romanian spoken in Moldova is the Moldavian dialect, which is spread approximately within the territory of the former Principality of Moldavia (now split between Romania, Moldova and Ukraine). Moldavian is considered one of the five major spoken varieties of Romanian. However, all five are written identically, and Moldova and Romania share the same literary language.

The standard alphabet used in Moldova is equivalent to the Romanian alphabet, which uses the Latin script. Until 1918, varieties of the Romanian Cyrillic alphabet were used. The Moldovan Cyrillic alphabet (derived from the Russian alphabet and standardised in the Soviet Union) was used in 1924–1932 and 1938–1989 and remains in use in Transnistria.

== History and politics ==
=== Birth of the concept ===
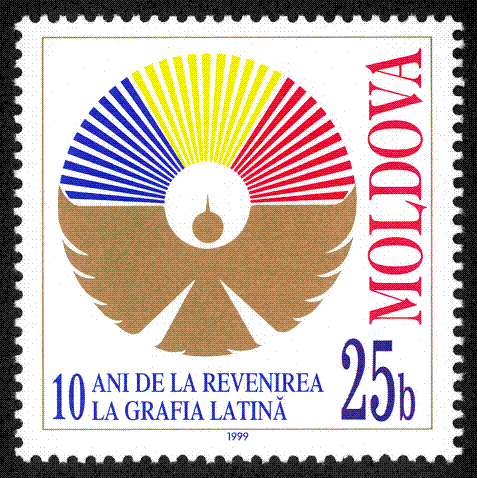
1999 Moldovan stamp celebrating 10 years since reverting to the Latin script

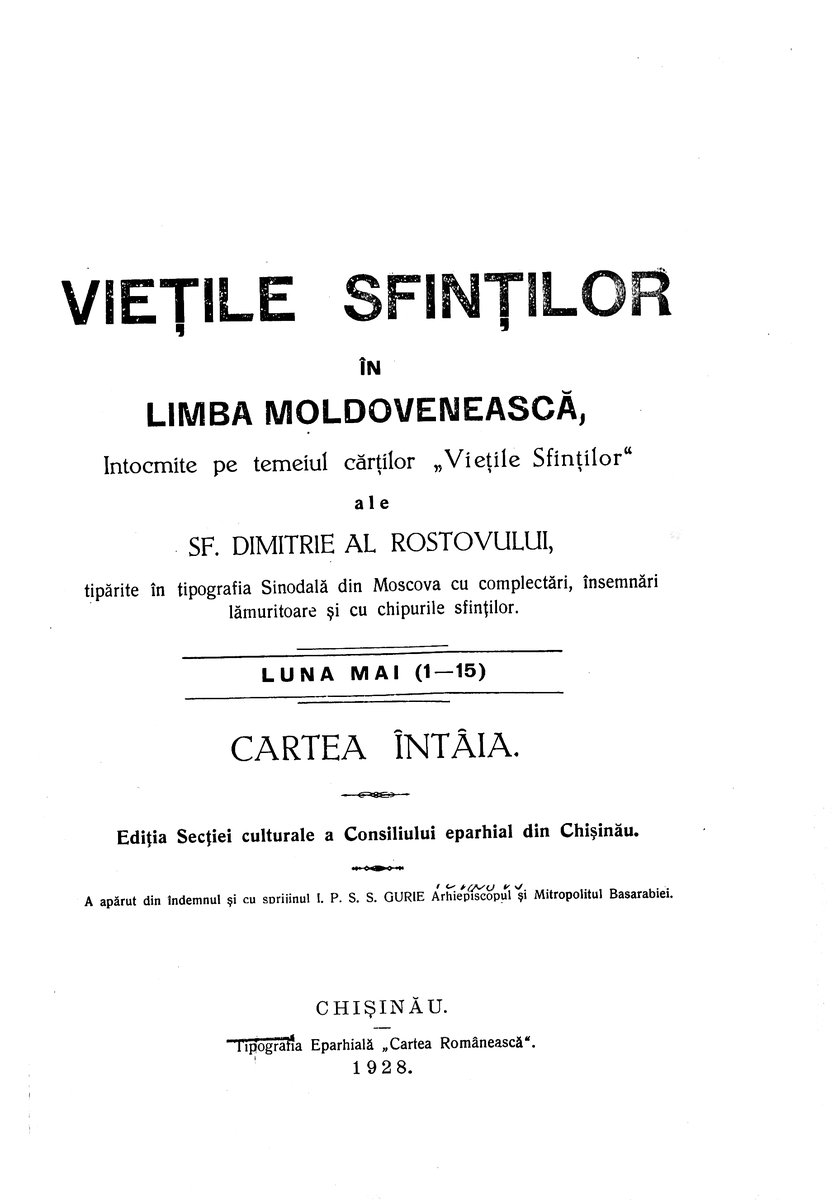
Book in a supposed Moldovan language published in interwar Romania

The history of the Moldovan language refers to the historical evolution of the glottonym Moldavian/Moldovan in Moldova and beyond. It is closely tied to the region's political status, as during long periods of rule by Russia and the Soviet Union, officials emphasized the language's name as part of separating the Moldovans from those people who began to identify as Romanian in a different nation-building process. Cyrillic script was in use. From a linguistic perspective, Moldovan is an alternative name for the varieties of the Romanian language spoken in the Republic of Moldova (see History of the Romanian language).

Before 1918, during the period between the wars, and after the union of Bessarabia with Romania, scholars did not have consensus that Moldovans and the Romanians formed a single ethnic group. The Moldovan peasants had grown up in a different political entity and missed the years of creating a pan-Romanian national political consciousness. They identified as Moldovans speaking the language "Moldovan". This caused reactions from pan-Romanian nationalists. The concept of the distinction of Moldovan from Romanian was explicitly stated only in the early 20th century. It accompanied the raising of national awareness among Moldovans, with the Soviets emphasizing distinctions between Moldavians and Romanians. Moldavian has also been recorded by the 1960s' Romanian Linguistic Atlas as the answer to the question "What [language] do you speak?" in parts of Western Moldavia (Galați and Iași counties).

Major developments since the fall of the Soviet Union include resuming use of a Latin script rather than Cyrillic letters in 1989, and several changes in the statutory name of the official language used in Moldova. At one point of particular confusion about identity in the 1990s, all references to geography in the name of the language were dropped, and it was officially known simply as limba de stat — 'the state language'.

Moldovan was assigned the code mo in ISO 639-1 and code mol in ISO 639-2 and ISO 639-3. Since November 2008, these have been deprecated, leaving ro and ron (639-2/T) and rum (639-2/B), the language identifiers as of 2013 to be used for the variant of the Romanian language also known as Moldavian and Moldovan in English, the ISO 639-2 Registration Authority said in explaining the decision.

In 1989, the contemporary Romanian version of the Latin alphabet was adopted as the official script of the Moldavian SSR.

The Moldovan school system has consistently used "Romanian" since 1990, both as the name of the language and as the national identity of Moldova's majority population, with subjects titled Limba și literatura română ("Romanian language and literature") and Istoria românilor ("History of the Romanians").

=== Independent Moldova ===
The Declaration of Independence of Moldova (27 August 1991) named the official language as "Romanian". The 1994 constitution, passed under a Communist government, declared "Moldovan" as the state language.

When in 1993 the Romanian Academy changed the official orthography of the Romanian language, the Institute of Linguistics at the Academy of Sciences of Moldova did not initially make these changes, which however have since been adopted.

In 1996, the Moldovan president Mircea Snegur attempted to change the official name of the language back to Romanian; the Moldovan Parliament, dominated by the Democratic Agrarian Party and various far left forces, dismissed the proposal as promoting "Romanian expansionism".

In 2003, the Moldovan–Romanian dictionary (Dicționar Moldovenesc–Românesc) by Vasile Stati was published aiming to prove that there existed two distinct languages. Reacting to this, linguists of the Romanian Academy in Romania declared that all the Moldovan words are also Romanian words, although some of its contents are disputed as being Russian loanwords. In Moldova, the head of the Academy of Sciences' Institute of Linguistics, Ion Bărbuță, described the dictionary as "an absurdity, serving political purposes". Stati, however, accused both of promoting "Romanian colonialism". At that point, a group of Romanian linguists adopted a resolution stating that promotion of the notion of a distinct Moldovan language is an anti-scientific campaign.

In 2003, the Parliament of the Republic of Moldova adopted a law defining Moldovan and Romanian as designations for the same language (glottonyms).

In the 2004 census, 16.5% (558,508) of the 3,383,332 people living in Moldova declared Romanian as their native language, whereas 60% declared Moldovan. Most of the latter responses were from rural populations. While the majority of the population in the capital city of Chișinău gave their language as "Romanian", in the countryside more than six-sevenths of the Romanian/Moldovan speakers indicated "Moldovan" as their native language, reflecting historic conservatism. Currently, 2,184,065 people or 80.2% of those covered by the 2014 census on the right bank of the Dniester or Moldova (proper, without the Transnistrian separatist region) identified Moldovan or Romanian as their native language, of which 1,544,726 (55.1%) declared Moldovan and 639,339 (22.8%) declared it Romanian. Of the total population that declared its mother tongue in the 2024 Moldovan census, 49.2% declared Moldovan and 31.3% declared Romanian. The share of the population that declared Romanian as its mother tongue increased by 8.1% compared to the 2014 census (23.2%), and the share that declared Moldovan decreased by 7.8% (56.9% in the 2014 census).

According to the 2014 census, 2,720,377 answered to the question on "language usually used for communication". 2,138,964 people or 78.63% of the inhabitants of Moldova (proper, without the Transnistrian separatist region) have Moldovan/Romanian as first language, of which 1,486,570 (53%) declared it Moldovan and 652,394 (23.3%) declared it Romanian. In the 2024 Moldovan census, regarding the usually spoken language (limbă vorbită de obicei; distinct from the mother tongue), 46.0% declared it to be "Moldovan" and 33.2% declared it to be Romanian, with both adding up to 79.2%. The two had together an increase of 0.5% compared to the 2014 census, and there was a significant increase in the share of self-declared speakers of Romanian as their usually spoken language, of 9.5%, as well as a decrease in the share of the self-declared speakers of "Moldovan" as their usually spoken language, of 9%, compared to the 2014 census.

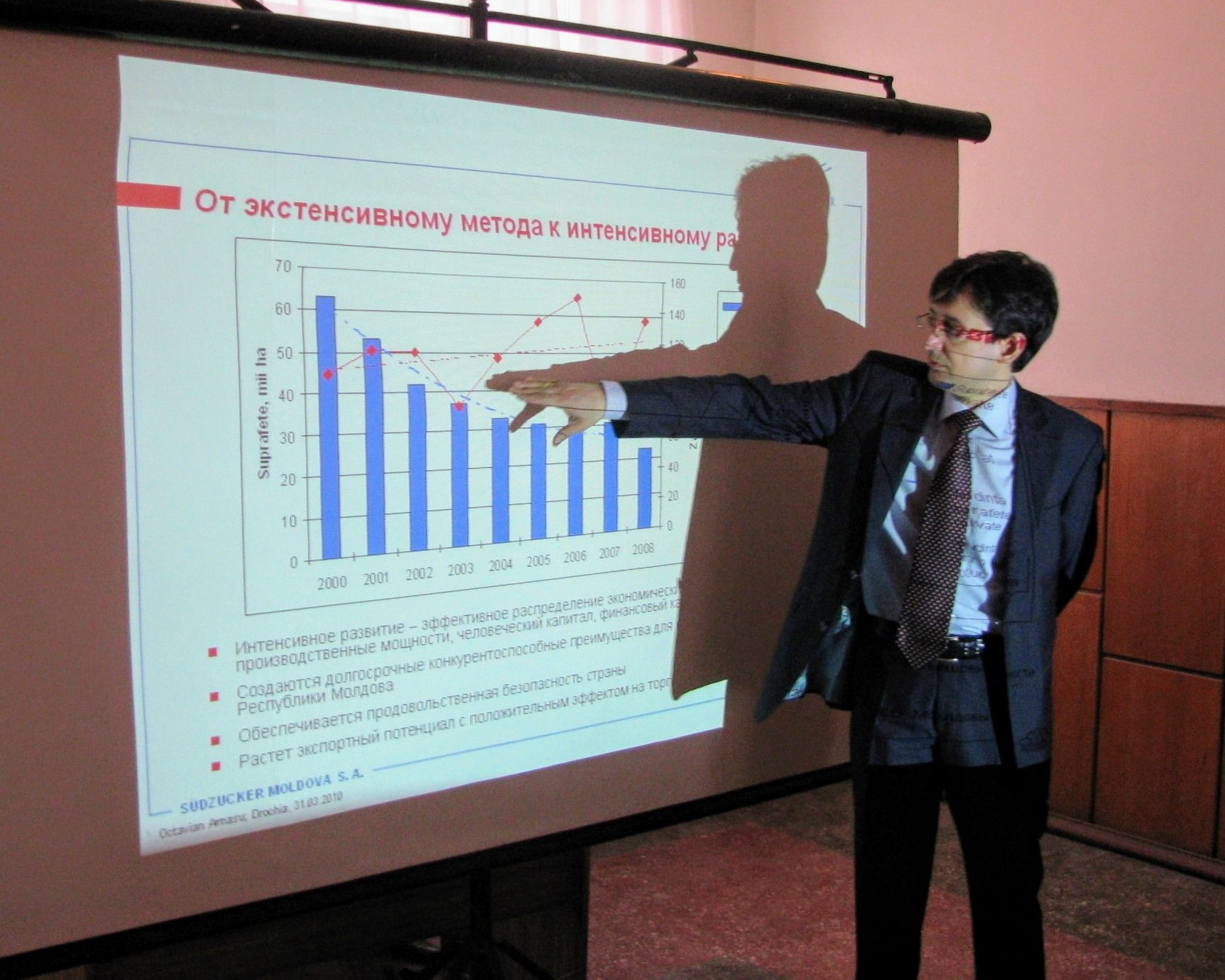
Octavian Armașu of Südzucker Moldova giving a presentation in Drochia in Russian, 2010. Since Soviet times, Russian usage has remained more common in Moldova than in Romania, having influenced the Moldovan dialect

In the Republic of Moldova, “more than half of the self-proclaimed Moldovans (53.5%) said that they saw no difference” between the Romanian and Moldovan languages according to a survey conducted by Pal Kolsto and Hans Olav Melberg in 1998. Opinion polling from the Chernivtsi oblast indicated that a significant majority of the self-identified Moldovans thought that there was no difference between the Moldovan language and the Romanian language in that part of Ukraine. According to Alla Skvortsova, an ethnic Russian researcher from the Republic of Moldova, "Our survey found that while 94.4 percent of the Romanians living in Moldova consider Moldovan and Romanian to be the same language, only half of the Moldovans (53.2 percent) share this view".

In December 2007, Moldovan president Vladimir Voronin asked for the term to be changed to Moldovan language, but due to public pressure against that choice, the term was not changed.

In December 2013, the Constitutional Court of Moldova ruled that the Declaration of Independence takes precedence over the Constitution and that the state language should be called Romanian.

By March 2017, the presidential website under Igor Dodon had changed the Romanian language option to Moldovan, which was described to be "in accordance with the constitution" by said president. The change was reverted on 24 December 2020, the day Maia Sandu assumed office.

In June 2021, during a meeting between the Minister of Foreign Affairs of Romania Bogdan Aurescu and the Minister of Foreign Affairs of Ukraine Dmytro Kuleba, the former asked Ukraine to recognize the nonexistence of the Moldovan language to improve the situation of the Romanians in Ukraine. Kuleba responded to this saying that they were trying to do the paperwork for this as soon as possible. On 30 November 2022, during another meeting between Aurescu and Kuleba, Aurescu reiterated this request. This happened again during a phone call between the two ministers on 12 April 2023, after Moldova had legally changed its official language to Romanian.

=== Discontinuation in Moldova and Ukraine ===
On 2 March 2023, the Moldovan parliament voted to replace the phrases "Moldovan language", "state language" and "official language" in Moldovan legislation with the phrase "Romanian language". The change was presented not as a constitutional change, but only a technical one, as it would implement the 2013 decision of the Constitutional Court of Moldova. This change was supported by the ruling Party of Action and Solidarity and was strongly opposed by the Bloc of Communists and Socialists. The Academy of Sciences of Moldova also supported this decision. The bill was approved on its second and final reading on 16 March. This attracted criticism from Russia. Maria Zakharova, the spokeswoman for the Ministry of Foreign Affairs of the Russian Federation, claimed that "the Romanian language should be renamed to Moldovan, and not the opposite". Romanian foreign minister Aurescu replied to this by saying, "This so-called Moldovan language does not exist, it is an artificial construct, which was created by the Soviet Union and has later been used by Russia for disinformation purposes". To this, Zakharova replied back by saying, "Dr. Bogdan Aurescu never existed either, but in the end he was created. Now it is possible to call him an artificial construct." The president of Moldova, Maia Sandu, promulgated the law on 22 March. It was published on the Monitorul Oficial al Republicii Moldova ("Official Bulletin of the Republic of Moldova"), a state publication where all promulgated laws are published, on 24 March, thus entering into force. On 30 March, the changes appeared on the Constitution of Moldova.

On 13 April, Romanian Foreign Minister Bogdan Aurescu requested the Ukrainian Foreign Minister Dmytro Kuleba to relinquish the recognition of the Moldovan language in Ukraine. However, as of June 2023, Ukraine still continued to make "Moldovan"-language schoolbooks.

On 18 August, Prime Minister of Romania Marcel Ciolacu and Prime Minister of Ukraine Denys Shmyhal had a meeting in Bucharest. Among the things that were discussed was the issue of the Romanian minority in Ukraine. Ciolacu said that Romania sought for the Romanians in Ukraine to have exactly the same rights as the Ukrainians in Romania and also for the removal of the Moldovan language from Ukrainian legislation.

Starting from 1 September 2023, the high school in the village of Borysivka (Borisăuca) in Odesa Oblast, where Ukrainian Romanians study, replaced the term "Moldovan language" with "Romanian language" in its curriculum.

On 10 October, during a meeting between Ciolacu and President of Ukraine Volodymyr Zelenskyy, Ciolacu once again requested that the Ukrainian authorities stop recognizing the existence of the Moldovan language. On the same day, during a meeting with Romanian journalists, Zelenskyy was asked if Ukraine would stop recognising the Moldovan language. He responded by saying that he did not see this as a global problem and that it was not an urgent issue for a country at war, but that the Ukrainian government would meet in a week or two and that a solution to the issue "I'm sure everyone will be happy" with would be found.

On 18 October, Ukrainian authorities promised to "resolve the issue of artificial separation between the Romanian and "Moldovan" languages by implementing appropriate practical measures with due consideration of all legal aspects." Former Moldovan president Igor Dodon, as well as the Revival Party, have criticised this decision. According to an expert on Ukrainian affairs interviewed by the Romanian newspaper Libertatea, "Marcel Ciolacu's visit to Ukraine marked the end of a diplomatic effort by the Republic of Moldova and Romania in the face of Kyiv but, at the same time, it marks only the beginning of a difficult, lasting process within the Ukrainian state." Thus, the Moldovan language would not have been derecognised by Ukraine on 18 October, this was only in process.

On 16 November, the Ministry of Education and Science of the Ukrainian government stated that it has initiated steps to abolish the Moldovan language and to replace it with Romanian. The Ukrainian Ministry of Education stated:

‘The Government of Ukraine adopted a decision regarding the use of the term "Romanian language" instead of the term "Moldovan language" in Ukraine. Currently, work is underway to bring the current legislation of Ukraine in line with this decision, which includes many internal regulatory legal acts. Separately, we note that all further acts of the government will be adopted considering the agreements. And all civil servants who allow violations of the government's decision will be subject to disciplinary action. The facts reported in the media regarding the printed textbooks refer to the copies approved for printing in May this year. The main edition of these textbooks was printed in the summer before the decision was made not to use the term "Moldovan language". Today, the Ministry of Education and Science of Ukraine has stopped any additional printing of these textbooks. And also develops a mechanism for replacing previously printed copies with textbooks in the Romanian language.'

On 13 January 2024, Ukrainian newspaper Dumska reported that the Ukrainian Ministry of Education and Science had announced all 16 schools in Odesa Oblast teaching "Moldovan" had dropped the term in favor of Romanian. However, Anatol Popescu, president of the Bessarabia National–Cultural Association, reported that in the Romanian school of Utkonosivka (Erdec-Burnu), the term had been replaced with "language of the national minority" instead, protesting against this and against other issues that had been reported regarding the school's intended renaming and reorganization into a high school.

On 24 December, the Ukrainian government approved a bill that proposed replacing "Moldovan" with Romanian on Ukraine's new proposed international list in the European Charter for Regional or Minority Languages (ECRML), which would exclude it from the protected languages in Ukraine. The bill also excluded the Belarusian and Russian languages. It required examination and approval by the Verkhovna Rada, Ukraine's parliament, to enter into force. According to a BucPress article published on 12 September 2025, the bill was not examined and was considered withdrawn, with Ukraine's Ministry of Culture having announced that it was working to resubmit the bill for examination.

A similar bill was subsequently submitted to the Verkhovna Rada by the government proposing to remove "Moldovan" and Russian from the list of protected languages, this time keeping Belarusian and also adding Czech, as reported by Adevărul, citing Glavkom, on 12 October. On 3 December, the bill was approved by the Verkhovna Rada, enabling the exclusion of Moldovan and Russian from Ukraine's list of languages protected in accordance with the ECRML. Ukrainian parliament member Yevheniia Kravchuk stated "We are correcting a historical inaccuracy. Instead of the artificial 'Moldovan' language, we are consecrating the Romanian language, just as it is recognized in Moldova itself." Zelenskyy signed the bill on 12 June, and it entered into force on 13 June, implementing the proposed amendments.

On 26 February 2026, in a "1+1" format meeting in Tiraspol between Moldovan government and Transnistrian separatist representatives, Valeriu Chiveri, Moldova's Deputy Prime Minister for Reintegration, requested that all schools teaching in "Moldovan" in Transnistria switch to teaching in Romanian from 1 September of that year. Vitaly Ignatiev, Transnistria's Minister of Foreign Affairs, rejected this demand, stating that the "Moldovan"-speaking population in Transnistria should decide.

== Controversy ==
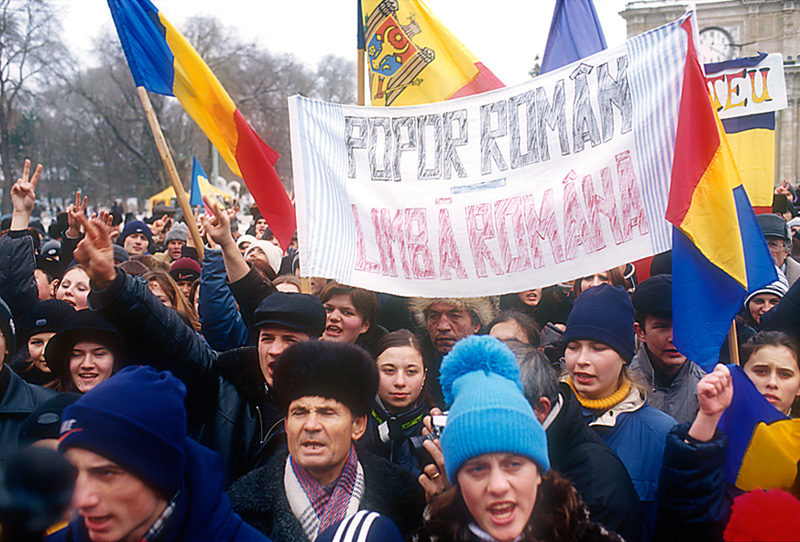
Demonstration in Chișinău, January 2002. The text on the inscription is "Romanian people—Romanian language".

The matter of whether or not Moldovan is a separate language continues to be contested politically within and beyond the Republic of Moldova. The 1989 Language Law of the Moldavian SSR, which is still in effect in Moldova, according to the Constitution, asserts a "linguistic Moldo-Romanian identity". Article 13 of the Moldovan Constitution used to name it "the national language of the country" (the original uses the phrase limba de stat, which literally means 'the language of the state') until 2023. In March 2023 the Parliament of Moldova has approved a law on referring to the national language as Romanian in all legislative texts and the constitution following the 2013 decision of the Constitutional Court of Moldova that gives primacy to the text of the 1991 Declaration of Independence of Moldova that calls the national language Romanian. The law was approved by the parliament on 16 March, and the President of Moldova promulgated the law on 22 March.

"Moldovan" is one of Transnistria's official languages, alongside Ukrainian and Russian.

Standard Moldovan is widely considered to be identical to standard Romanian. Writing about "essential differences", Vasile Stati is obliged to concentrate almost exclusively on lexical rather than grammatical differences. Whatever language distinctions may once have existed, these have been decreasing rather than increasing. King wrote in 2000 that "in the main, Moldovan in its standard form was more Romanian by the 1980s than at any point in its history".

In 2002, the Moldovan Minister of Justice Ion Morei said that Romanian and Moldovan were the same language and that the Constitution of Moldova should be amended to reflect this—not by substituting Romanian for the word Moldovan, but by adding that "Romanian and Moldovan are the same language". The education minister Valentin Beniuc said: "I have stated more than once that the notion of a Moldovan language and a Romanian language reflects the same linguistic phenomenon in essence." The president of Moldova Vladimir Voronin acknowledged that the two languages are identical, but said that Moldovans should have the right to call their language "Moldovan".

In the 2004 census, of the citizens living in Moldova, 60% identified Moldovan as their native language; 16.5% chose Romanian. While 37% of all urban Romanian/Moldovan speakers identified Romanian as their native language, in the countryside 86% of the Romanian/Moldovan speakers indicated Moldovan, a historic holdover. Independent studies found a Moldovan linguistic identity asserted in particular by the rural population and post-Soviet political class. In a survey conducted in four villages near the border with Romania, when asked about their native language the interviewees identified the following: Moldovan 53%, Romanian 44%, and Russian 3%.

In November 2007, when reporting on EU Council deliberations regarding an agreement between the European Community and Moldova, the Romanian reporter Jean Marin Marinescu included a recommendation to avoid formal references to the "Moldovan language". The Romanian press speculated that the EU banned the usage of the phrase "Moldovan language". However, the European Commissioner for External Relations and European Neighbourhood Policy, Benita Ferrero-Waldner, denied these allegations. She said that the Moldovan language is referred to in the 1998 Cooperation Agreement between the EU and Moldova, and hence it is considered a part of the acquis, binding on all member states.

== Orthography ==
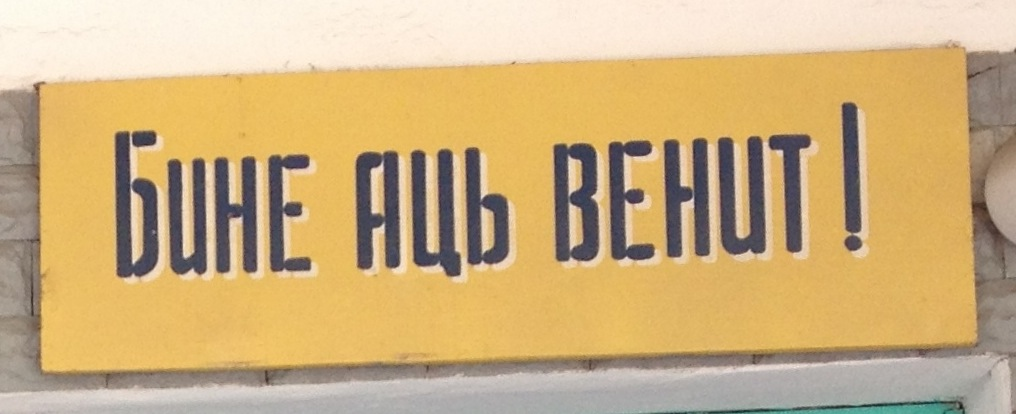
A welcome sign in Moldovan Cyrillic in Tiraspol, the capital of Transnistria, in 2012. The phrase in Latin alphabet is Bine ați venit!

The language was generally written in a Romanian Cyrillic alphabet (based on the Old Church Slavonic alphabet) before the 19th century. Both Cyrillic and, rarely, Latin, were used until after World War I; after Bessarabia was included in Romania in 1918, the Cyrillic alphabet was officially forbidden in the region. In the interwar period, Soviet authorities in the Moldavian Autonomous Soviet Socialist Republic alternately used Latin or Cyrillic for writing the language, mirroring the political goals of the moment. From 1932 to 1938, during the wave of latinisation in the Soviet Union, the literary norm of the Moldovan language was completely consistent with the Romanian language. Between 1938 and 1989, i.e., during Soviet rule of Bessarabia, the Moldovan Cyrillic alphabet replaced Latin as the official alphabet in Moldova (then Moldavian SSR). In 1989, the Latin script was once again adopted in Moldova by Law 3462 of 31 August 1989, which provided rules for transliterating Cyrillic to Latin, along with the orthographic rules used in Romania at the time. Transnistria, however, uses the Cyrillic alphabet.

Though not immediately adopting these, the Academy of Sciences of Moldova acknowledged both the Romanian Academy's decision of 1993 and the orthographic reform of 2005. In 2000, the Moldovan Academy recommended adopting the spelling rules used in Romania, and in 2010 launched a schedule for the transition to the new rules that was completed in 2011 (regarding its publications). However, these changes were not implemented by Moldova's Ministry of Education, so the old orthographic conventions were maintained in the education sector such as in school textbooks.

On 17 October 2016, Minister of Education Corina Fusu signed Order No. 872 on the application of the revised spelling rules as adopted by the Moldovan Academy of Sciences, coming into force on the day of signing. Since then the spelling used by institutions subordinated to the Ministry of Education is in line with the spelling norms used in Romania since 1993. This order, however, has no application to other government institutions, nor has Law 3462 been amended to reflect these changes; thus, those institutions continue to use the old spelling.

== See also ==
- Eastern Romance substratum
- Legacy of the Roman Empire
- Moldova–Romania relations
- Thraco-Roman
- The Balkan language area
