= Thomas Thornton (merchant) =

British merchant in the Ottoman Empire and writer (1762–1814)

- Born: 1762; London, England
- Died: March 28, 1814 (aged 51–52); Burnham, Buckinghamshire
- Occupations: Merchant and writer
- Known for: Writings on the Ottoman Empire
- Spouse: Sophie Zohrab
- Children: Several including William Thomas Thornton

Thomas Thornton (1762–1814) was a British merchant in the Ottoman Empire and writer on the Ottoman Empire.

== Life ==
Thornton was born in London, the eldest child of Thomas Thornton (1738–1769), who had come from Hull, East Yorkshire to London and established himself as a prosperous innkeeper and Freeman of the City of London, and Dorothy (née Thompson; died 1769), "a countrywoman... a native of the... East Riding, of a very respectable family". His younger brother was the diplomat Edward Thornton, 1st Count of Cacilhas.

Because his parents died when he was seven years old, a family friend ensured the education at Christ's Hospital for Thornton and his four brothers. Thomas's education prepared him for a career in one of the most important English trading houses of the time. In 1790, at only 28 years old, he became consul of the Levant Company. In about 1793 he was sent to the British factory at Constantinople, where he resided fourteen years, making a stay of fifteen months at Odessa, and paying frequent visits to Asia Minor and the islands of the Archipelago. During that period he gathered information that would be used in the writing of The Present State of Turkey. While at Constantinople he married Sophie Zohrab, the daughter of a Greek merchant, by whom he had a large family.

About the end of 1813 Thornton was appointed consul to the Levant Company, but when on the eve of setting out for Alexandria he died at Burnham, Buckinghamshire, on 28 March 1814. His youngest son was William Thomas Thornton.

== Works ==
After his return to England, Thornton published in 1807 The Present State of Turkey (London; 2nd edit. 1809), in which, after a summary of Ottoman history, he gave an account of the political and social institutions of the Turkish empire. Thornton is favourable to the Turks, protesting against criticism related to their friendship with France. He attacked William Eton's Survey of the Turkish Empire (1798), and drew from Eton in reply 'A Letter to the Earl of D ... on the Political Relations of Russia in regard to Turkey, Greece, and France' (1807).

== Notes ==
Attribution

This article incorporates text from a publication now in the public domain: "Thornton, Thomas (d.1814)". Dictionary of National Biography. London: Smith, Elder & Co. 1885–1900.
