= Dicționar moldovenesc-românesc =

Dictionary compiled by Vasile Stati

- Author: Vasile Stati
- Language: Romanian
- Subject: dictionary
- Publisher: Chișinău
- Publication date: 2003
- Publication place: Moldova
- ISBN: 9975-78-248-5

The Dicționar moldovenesc-românesc ("Moldovan–Romanian dictionary") is a dictionary compiled by Vasile Stati and published in 2003 in Chișinău in Moldova. Being the first and only one of its kind, it contains 19,000 allegedly Moldovan (one of the two names for the Romanian language in Moldova) words that are explained in Romanian. Its publishing was followed by a wave of criticism both in the Republic of Moldova and Romania. Strongly challenged by the Moldovan historian community, the "Moldovan-Romanian Dictionary" is considered nonsensical by many linguists in Chișinău, being nothing more than a lexicon of rarely used or obsolete words, archaisms and regionalisms specific to the Moldavian dialect of the Romanian language.

The idea of a dictionary might have come when the Romanian then-president, Ion Iliescu, said that he would believe that Moldovan is a different language from Romanian when he had a Moldovan–Romanian dictionary in his hands.

The dictionary includes:

- Supposed Moldovan words that are also common in Romanian;
- Regionalisms from Moldova, some of which are also used in the neighbouring Moldavia region in Romania as well;
- Archaic Romanian words from old documents that are no longer in use in Romania but some of which remain in use in Moldova;
- Russian and other East Slavic loanwords that were adopted into Moldavian dialect through Sovietization and Russification, but are not part of standard Romanian.
