= Iujnoe =

- Interactive map of Iujnoe
- Location within Moldova
- Country: Moldova
- District: Cahul District

Population (2014 census)
  - Total: 707
- Time zone: UTC+2 (EET)
  - Summer (DST): UTC+3 (EEST)

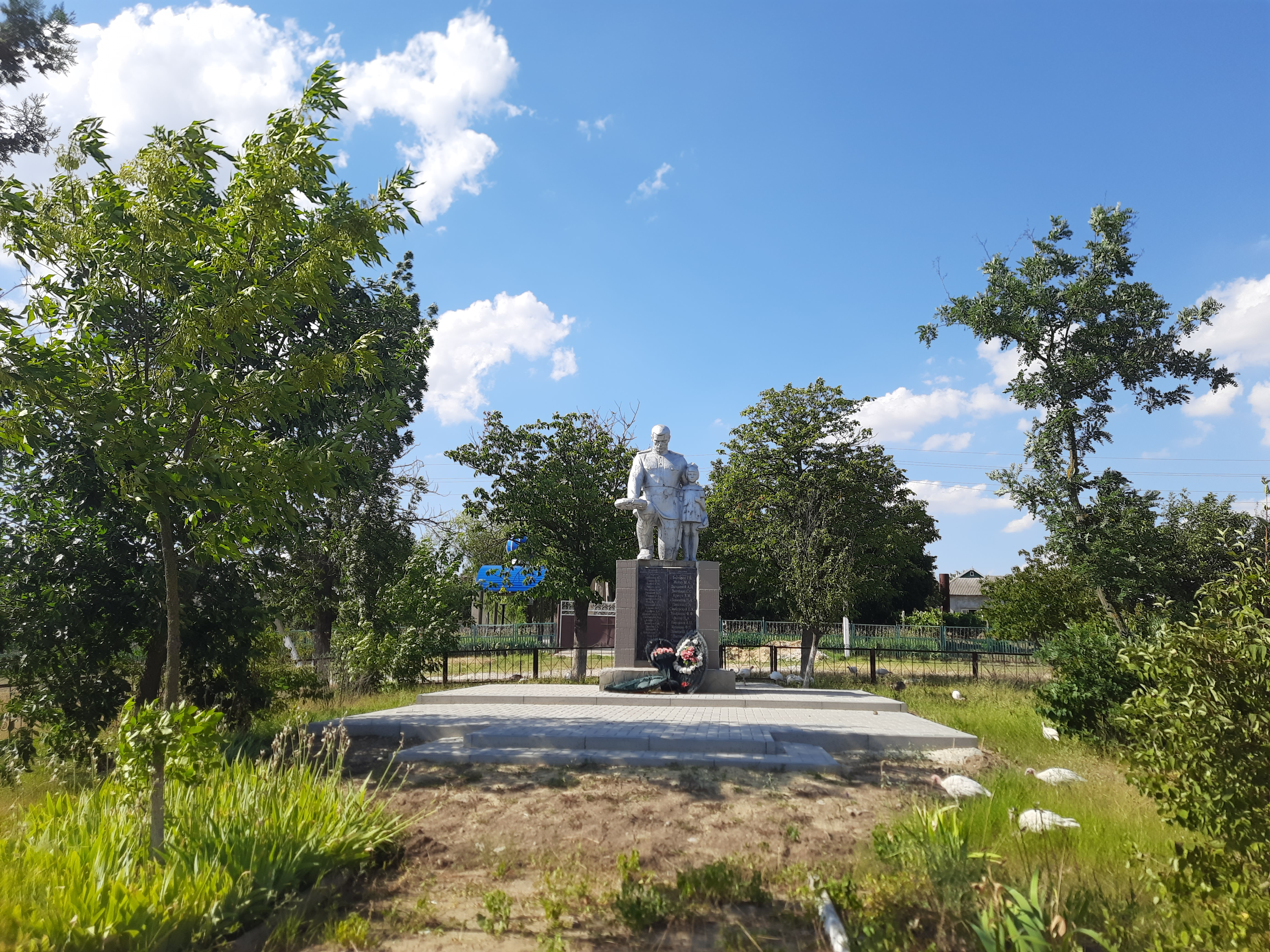
Monument in memory of the villagers who fell in WWII

Iujnoe is a village in Cahul District, Moldova.
