= Alexanderfeld, Cahul =

Alexanderfeld
- Village
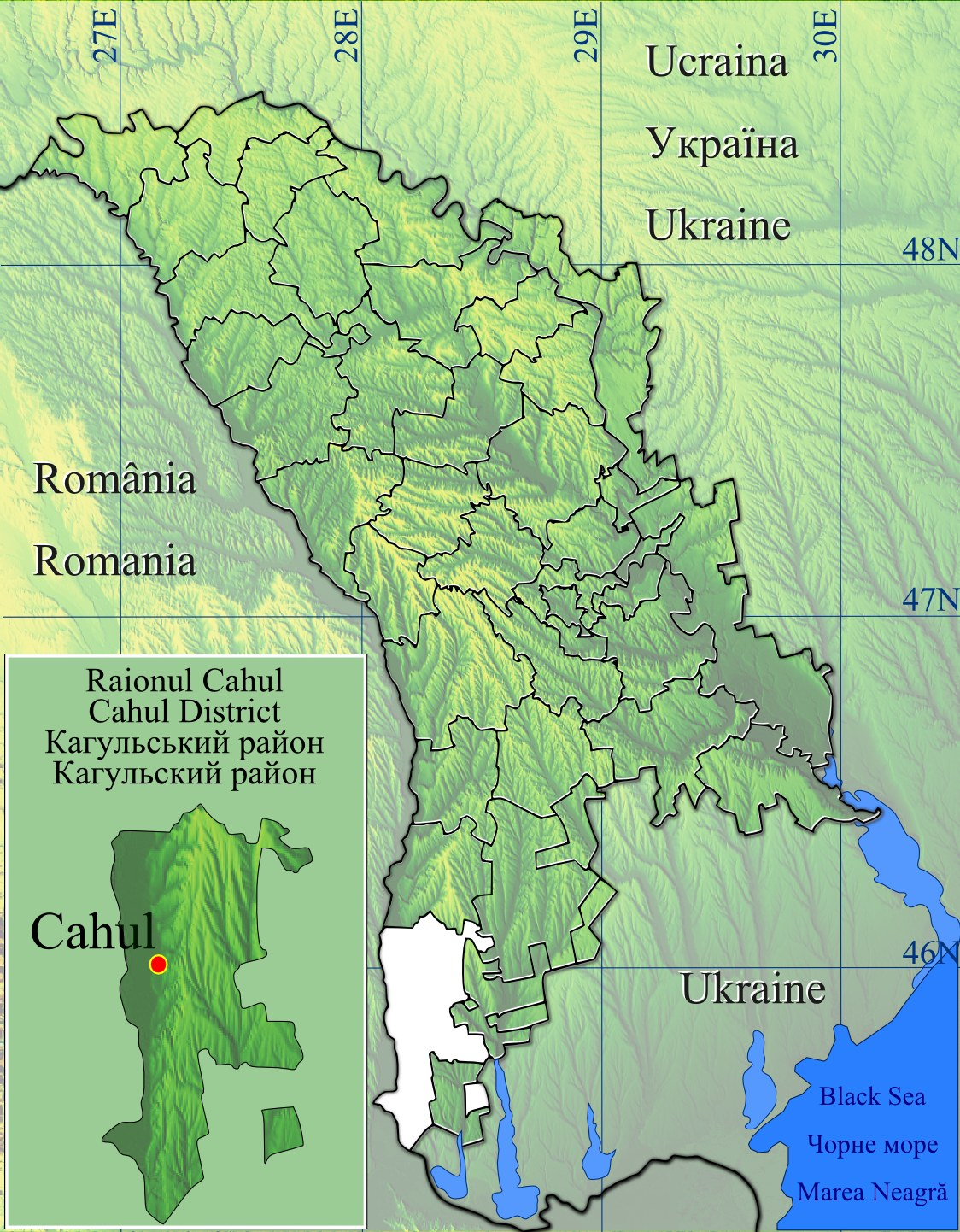
- Location within Cahul
- Coordinates: 45°48′39″N 28°25′47″E
- Country: Moldova
- District: Cahul District

Government
  - Mayor: Liubov Arnautova (Independent)

Area
  - Total: 31 km^{2} (12 sq mi)

Population (2014 census)
  - Total: 1,344
- Time zone: UTC+2 (EET)
  - Summer (DST): UTC+3 (EEST)
- Postal code: MD-5314

Alexanderfeld (formerly Alexandru cel Bun and Cîmpeni) is a village in Cahul District, Moldova. It is a traditional ethnic and cultural centre for Moldova's Bessarabian Germans.

Within the village are both a Pentecostal church and an Orthodox church (currently under construction). There is also a school, several small shops and a restaurant.
