= Taraclia County =

Taraclia County Județul Taraclia
- County
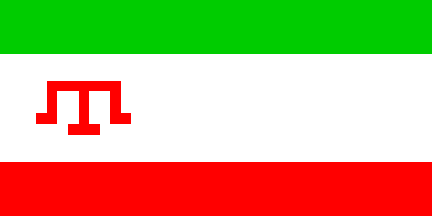
- Flag

- Country: Moldova
- capital: Taraclia
- Established: 1999
- Ceased to exist: 2003

Area
  - Total: 674 km^{2} (260 sq mi)

Population (2003)
  - Total: 45,600
  - Density: 67.7/km^{2} (175/sq mi)

Taraclia County (Romanian: Județul Taraclia, Bulgarian: Тараклия окръг) was a county (Romanian: județ) in Moldova from 1999 to 2003. It was established on 22 October 1999. It borders Ukraine, Lăpușna County and Chișinău County. Its capital is the city of Taraclia.

Taraclia County had 26 localities.

== Administrative organization ==
The county was divided into nine communes:

1. Albota de Jos, which included the villages of Albota de Jos, Balabanu, Hagichioi, and Hîrtop
2. Albota de Sus, which included the villages of Albota de Sus, Cealîc, Cortenul Nou, Roșița, Samurza, and Sofievca
3. Aluatu, which included the villages of Aluatu and Novosiolovca
4. Budăi, which included the villages of Budăi, Dermengi, and Musaitu
5. Cairaclia, which included the village of Cairaclia
6. Corten, which included the village of Corten
7. Tvardița, which included the village of Tvardița
8. Valea Perjei, which included the village of Valea Perjei
9. Vinogradovca, which included the villages of Vinogradovca, Chirilovca, Ciumai, Mirnoe, Orehovca, and Salcia
