= Taraclia District =

Coordinates: 45°55′N 28°35′E

Taraclia District Raionul Taraclia
- District (Raion)
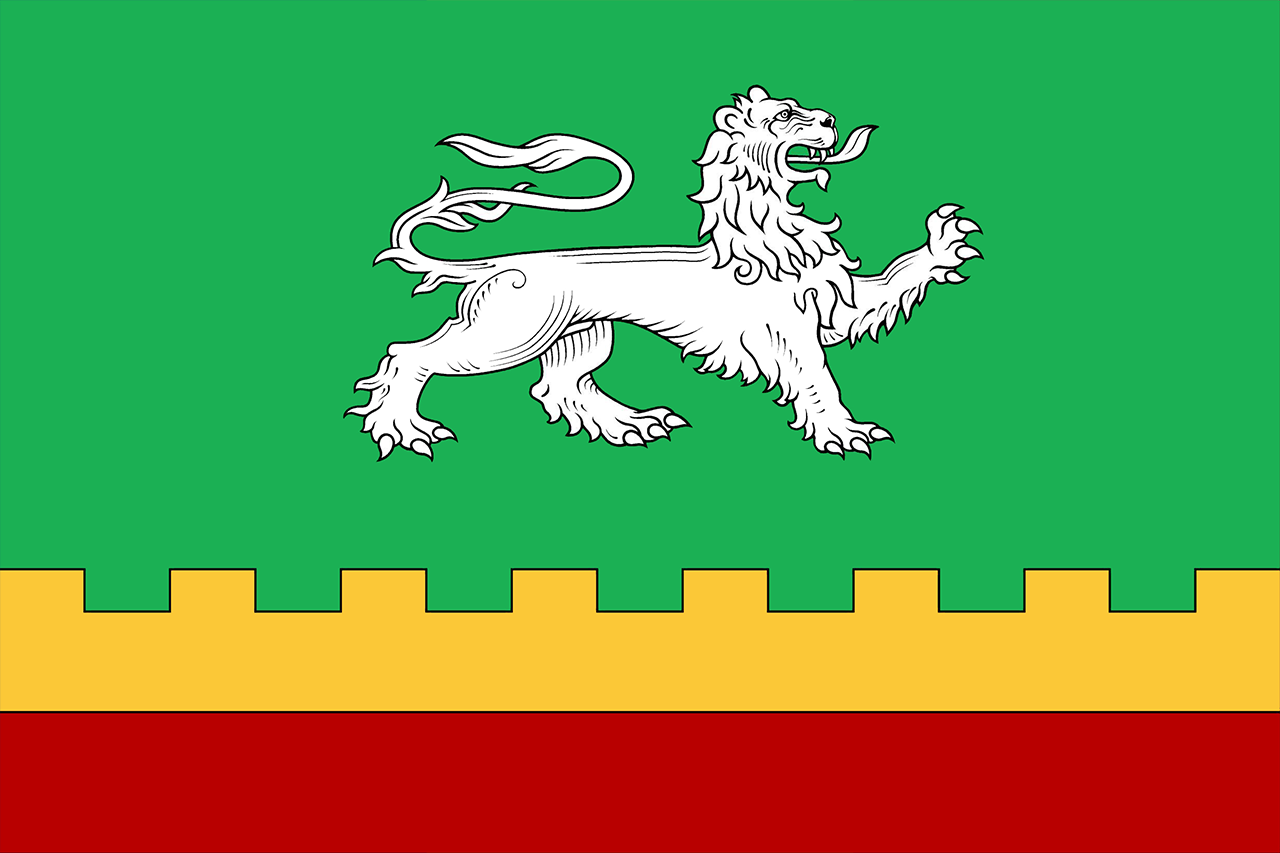
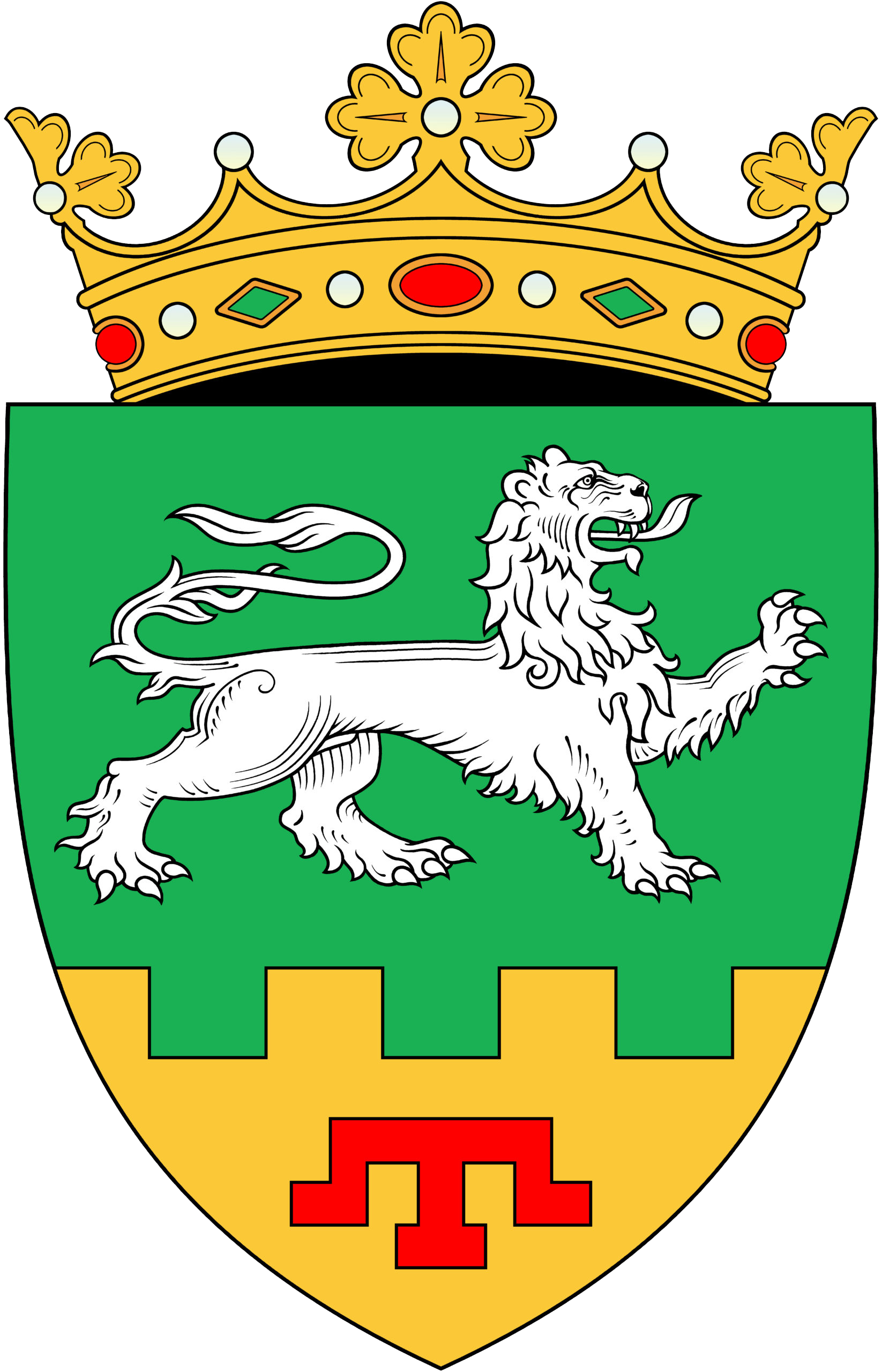
- Flag Coat of arms

- Country: Republic of Moldova
- Administrative center (Oraş-reşedinţă): Taraclia
- Established: 2002

Government
  - Raion President: Lazari Dermenji (2023) (PSRM)

Area
  - Total: 673.9 km^{2} (260.2 sq mi)

Population (2024)
  - Total: 26,435
  - Density: 39.23/km^{2} (101.6/sq mi)
- Time zone: UTC+2 (EET)
  - Summer (DST): UTC+3 (EEST)
- Area code: +373 74
- Car plates: TA

Taraclia (Romanian pronunciation: [taraˈkli.a], Bulgarian: Тараклия) is a district (Romanian: raion) in the south of Moldova, with the administrative center at Taraclia. It is surrounded by the Cahul District and the Autonomous Territorial Unit of Gagauzia, encompassing the enclave of Copceac. The majority of the districts population are ethnic Bulgarians (64.2%). As of the 2024 Moldovan census the district has a population of 26,435.

== History ==
The district was formed on 11 November 1940, with its center in the village of Taraclia, in the Moldavian SSR. Until 16 October 1949 it was part of the Cahul district, after the abolition of the district it passed to direct republican subordination.

Between 31 January 1952 and 15 June 1953 the area was part of Cahul district, after the abolition of the county division it returned to direct republican subordination. In 1956 the territory of Taraclia district was almost doubled due to the annexation of parts of the territory of the abolished Congaz district. In 1962 the Taraclia district was abolished and its territory was divided between the neighboring regions of Kahul, Comrat and Ceadîr-Lunga. On 10 November 1980, the district was restored with almost the same boundaries as in 1956, adding part of the territories of Vulcănești and Ceadîr-Lunga districts.

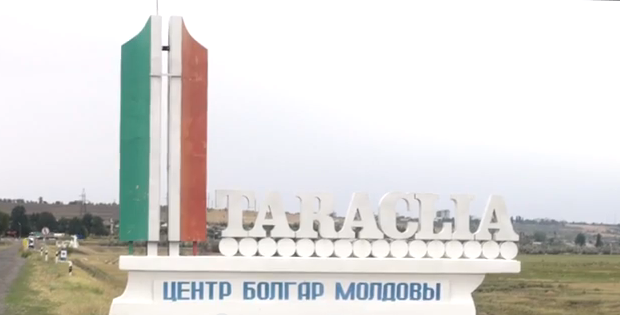
Welcome to Taraclia sign

In the mid-1990s, after the creation of the autonomous territorial entity of Gagauzia, there was a mutual transfer of villages between Gagauzia and the Taraclia region. As a result of the transfer, the region was territorially divided into two unrelated parts. In 1999, as part of the ongoing administrative reform, the region became part of the Cahul county, but on 22 October 1999, at the request of the majority of ethnic Bulgarians in the region, a separate Taraclia county was created.

The Taraclia District was founded in 2003. Until February 2003, the area belonged to the now dissolved Cahul District (Județul Cahul) together with today's Cahul District and Cantemir. As the center of the Bulgarian minority in Moldova, which accounts for about 66% of the population, today there are numerous Bulgarian cultural institutions and schools in Taraclia District. The Bulgarian language is also one of the languages of instruction at the Taraclia State University.

The regional authorities in Taraclia have long been demanding more autonomy rights for their region. In early 2014, a union with the autonomous region of Gagauzia was also discussed. According to the regional president of Taraclia, numerous other localities, mostly inhabited by Bulgarians, from other parts of Moldova applied to join the Taraclia district. Semi-independent of Moldova's central government, the rayon regional administration maintains separate relations with Russia. Taraclia is considered a stronghold of pro-Russian political parties in Moldova. Due to dissatisfaction with the Chișinău government, separatist tendencies have intensified in the region in recent years.

== Geography ==
Taraclia District consists of two parts, the main enclave with the capital Taraclia is surrounded by the Autonomous Territorial Unit of Gagauzia, Cahul District and Odesa Oblast. The second enclave is surrounded by Gagauzia and Odesa Oblast, consisting of the town Tvardița and the village Valea Perjei.

== Administrative divisions ==
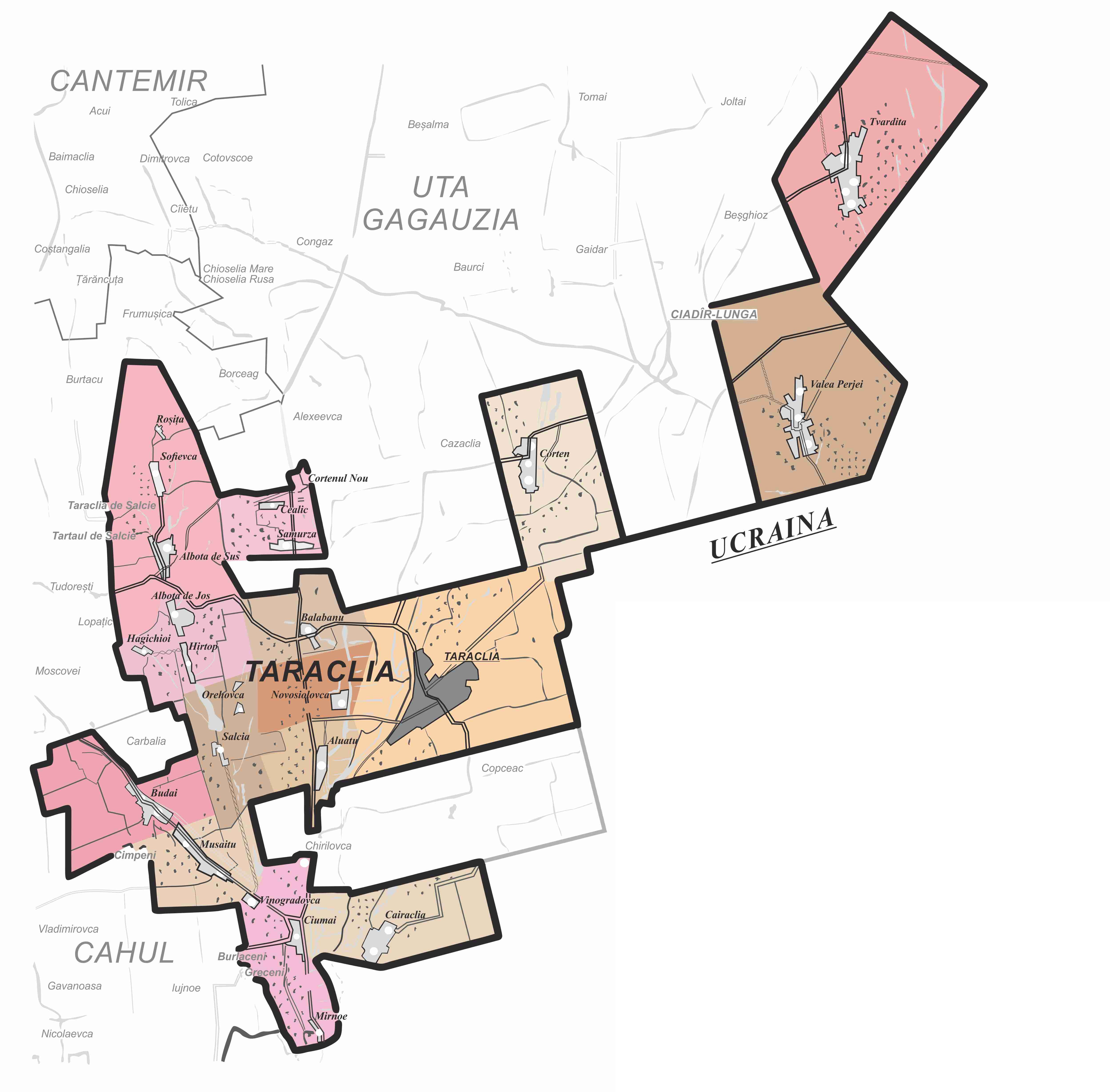
Schematic map of Taraclia District

Taraclia District is divided into 15 separate localities, with the status of one city, one town, six communes and seven villages respectively.

Rank	Name	Locality	Population
1	Taraclia	City	10,021
2	Tvardița	Town	3,503
3	Albota de Jos	Commune	952
4	Albota de Sus	Commune	1,304
5	Budăi	Commune	591
6	Cealîc	Commune	633
7	Salcia	Commune	182
8	Vinogradovca	Commune	1,128
9	Aluatu	Village	497
10	Balabanu	Village	604
11	Cairaclia	Village	1,154
12	Corten	Village	1,833
13	Musaitu	Village	554
14	Novosiolovca	Village	842
15	Valea Perjei	Village	2,637

== Demographics ==
As of the 2024 Census, the district population was 26,435 - with 51.2% living in urban areas and 48.8% living in rural areas - making it the most urban raion in Moldova, surpassed only by the municipalities of Chișinău and Bălți.

Ethnic composition (2004-2025)
Ethnicity	2004		2014		2024	
Ethnicity	Number	%	Number	%	Number	%
Bulgarians	28,293	65.6	24,581	66.1	16,984	64.2
Moldovans (Note: There is an ongoing controversy regarding the ethnic identification of Moldovans and Romanians.)	5,980	13.9	5,206	14.0	3,901	14.8
Gagauz	3,587	8.3	3,346	9.0	2,730	10.3
Ukrainians	2,646	6.1	1,934	5.2	1,305	4.9
Russians	2,139	5.0	1,673	4.5	1,092	4.1
Romani	-	-	186	0.5	152	0.6
Romanians	29	0.1	74	0.2	71	0.3
Other	480	1.1	-	-	140	0.5
Not Declared	0	0	186	0.5	60	0.2
Total	43,154	100	37,188	100	26,435	100

== Religion ==
Religious composition (2004-2025)
Religion	2004		2014		2024	
Religion	Number	%	Number	%	Number	%
Christians	41,704	96.64	35,209	94.67	26,010	98.38
– Orthodox Christians	40,701	94.31	34,480	92.72	25,160	95.17
– Baptists	573	1.33	540	1.45	596	2.25
– Seventh-day Adventist	84	0.19	15	0.04	30	0.11
– Penticostal	110	0.25	73	0.2	35	0.13
– Old Believers	3	0.01	0	0	3	0.01
– Evangelic Christian	157	0.36	47	0.13	181	0.68
– Lutheran	-	-	44	0.13	-	-
– Roman Catholic	14	0.03	10	0.02	5	0.01
– Presbyterian	62	0.14	-	-	-	-
Jehovah's Witnesses	-	-	112	0.3	99	0.37
Atheist	141	0.33	16	0.04	37	0.14
Judaism	-	-	1	0.01	-	-
Muslim	-	-	21	0.5	17	0.06
Other	802	1.86	5	0.01	156	0.59
Not Declared	507	1.17	1,993	5.36	116	0.43
Total	43,154	100	37,188	100	26,435	100

== Politics ==
Traditionally in Taraclia district, political and electoral support for the PCRM is higher than the rest of the southern part of Moldova. Communists have the largest percentage of the Moldova votes in this district. But the last three elections communists saw a continuous decline in percentage.

2025 Moldovan parliamentary election results in Taraclia District
Parties and coalitions	Votes	%
Patriotic Electoral Bloc	12,375	79.51
Alternative (political bloc)	1,636	10.51
Party of Action and Solidarity	950	6.10
Democracy at Home Party	112	0.72
Our Party (Moldova)	108	0.69
National Moldavian Party	50	0.32
Respect Moldova Movement	49	0.31
Alliance of Moldovans	46	0.30
Olesea Stamate	35	0.22
European Social Democratic Party	34	0.22
Other Parties	125	0.79
Total	15,565	100.00

== Education ==
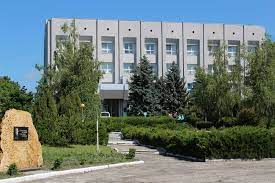
Gregory Tsamblak State University active from 2004–2023

In the Taraclia district there are 17 schools. The Gregory Tsamblak State University is based in Taraclia and is under restructuring as a part of the University of Ruse.

== Sport ==
The football club Levski Trakia is based in Taraclia, which is sponsored by the Association for Development of Bulgarian Community (ARBOM).

== See also ==
- Taraclia County
- Bessarabian Bulgarians
