= Tvardița =

Tvardița Твърдица
- Town
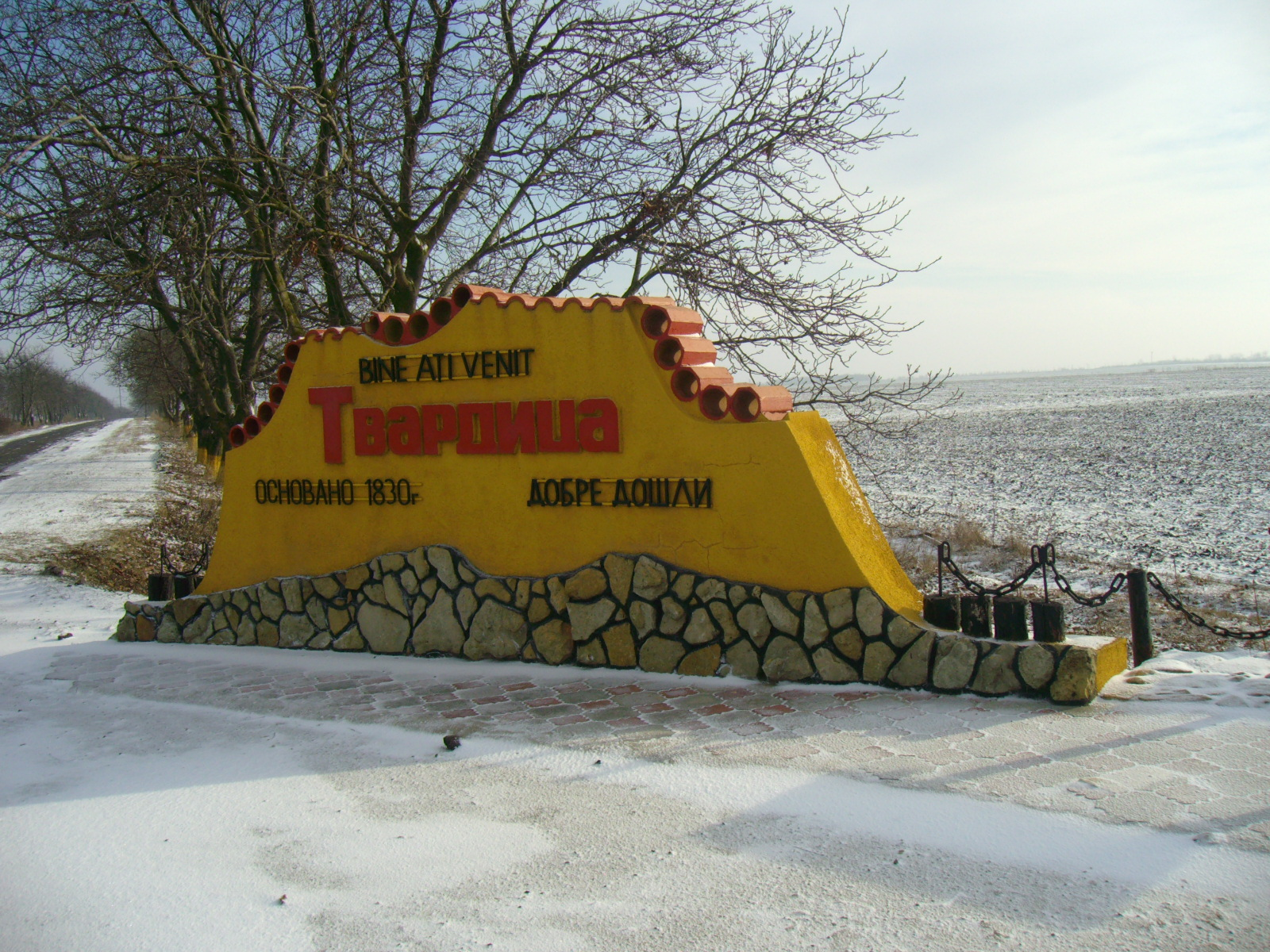
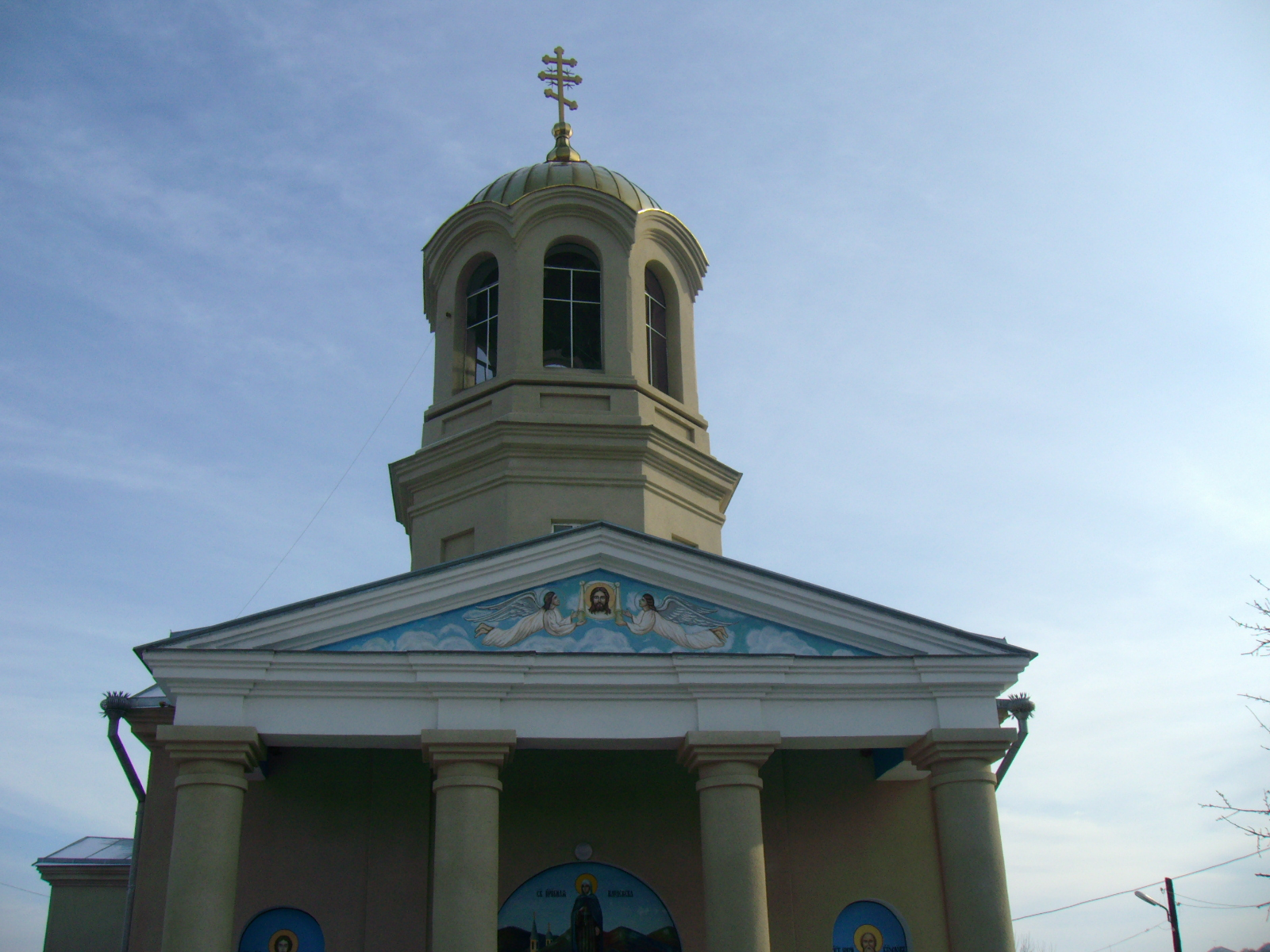
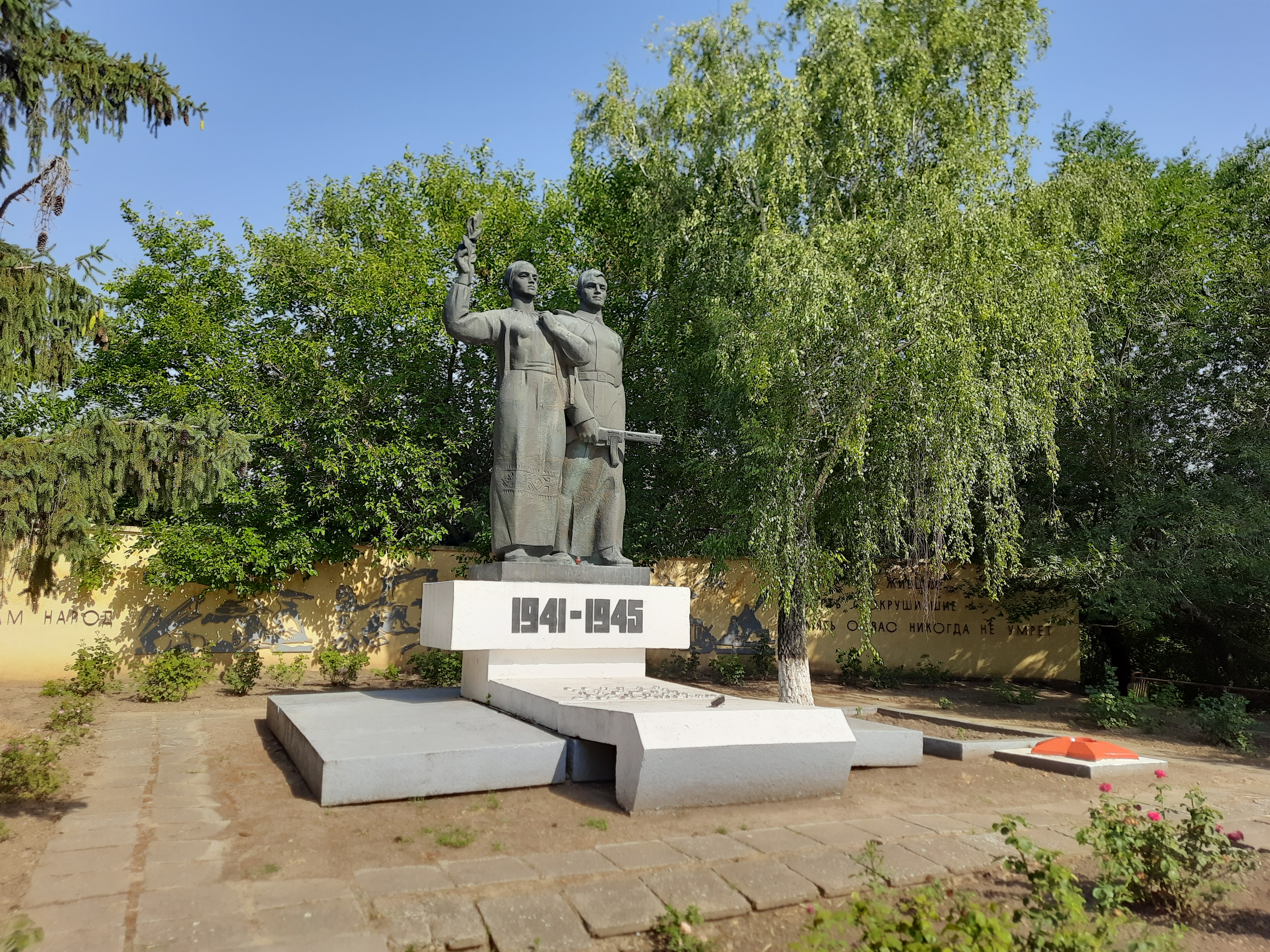
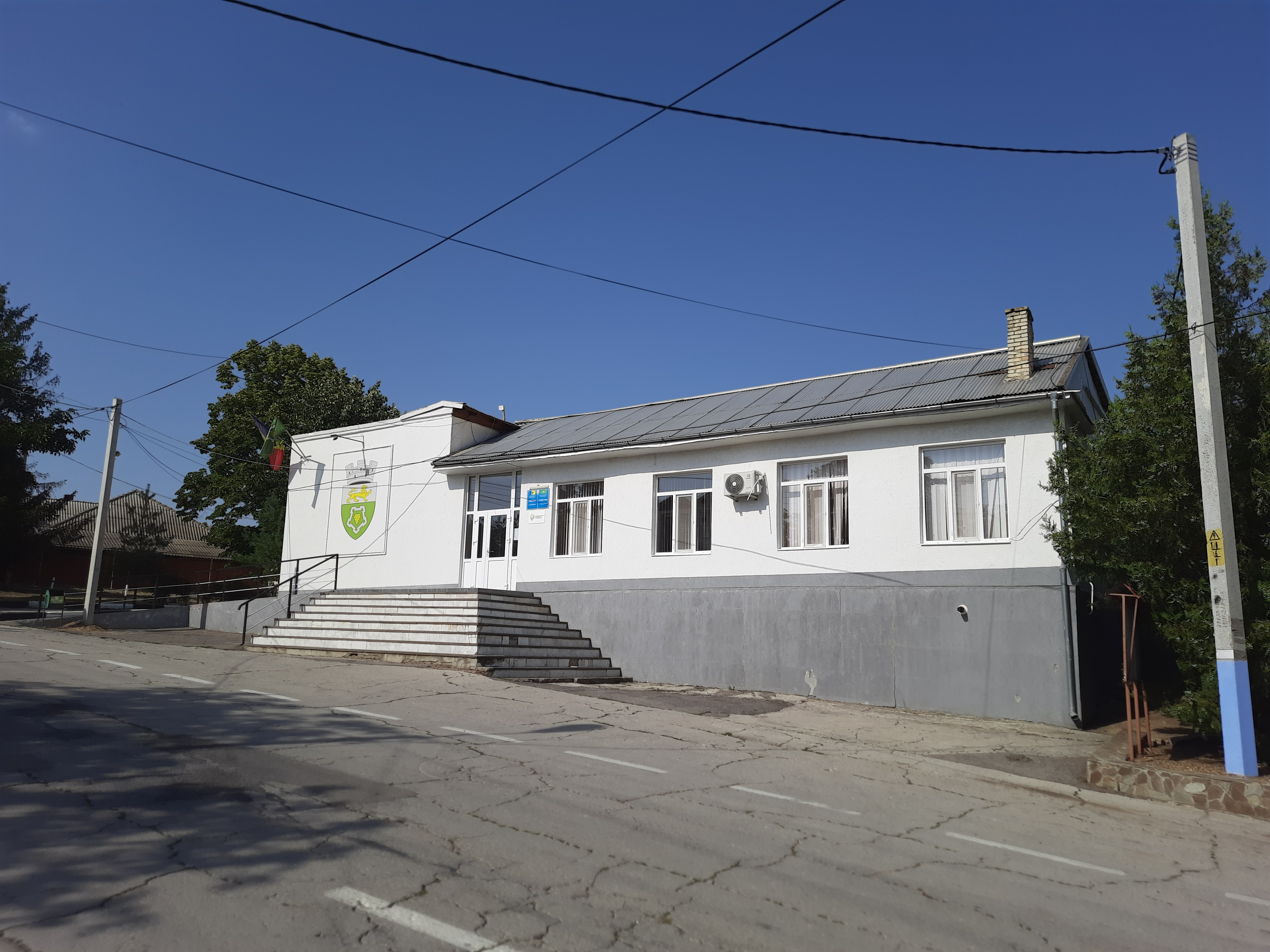
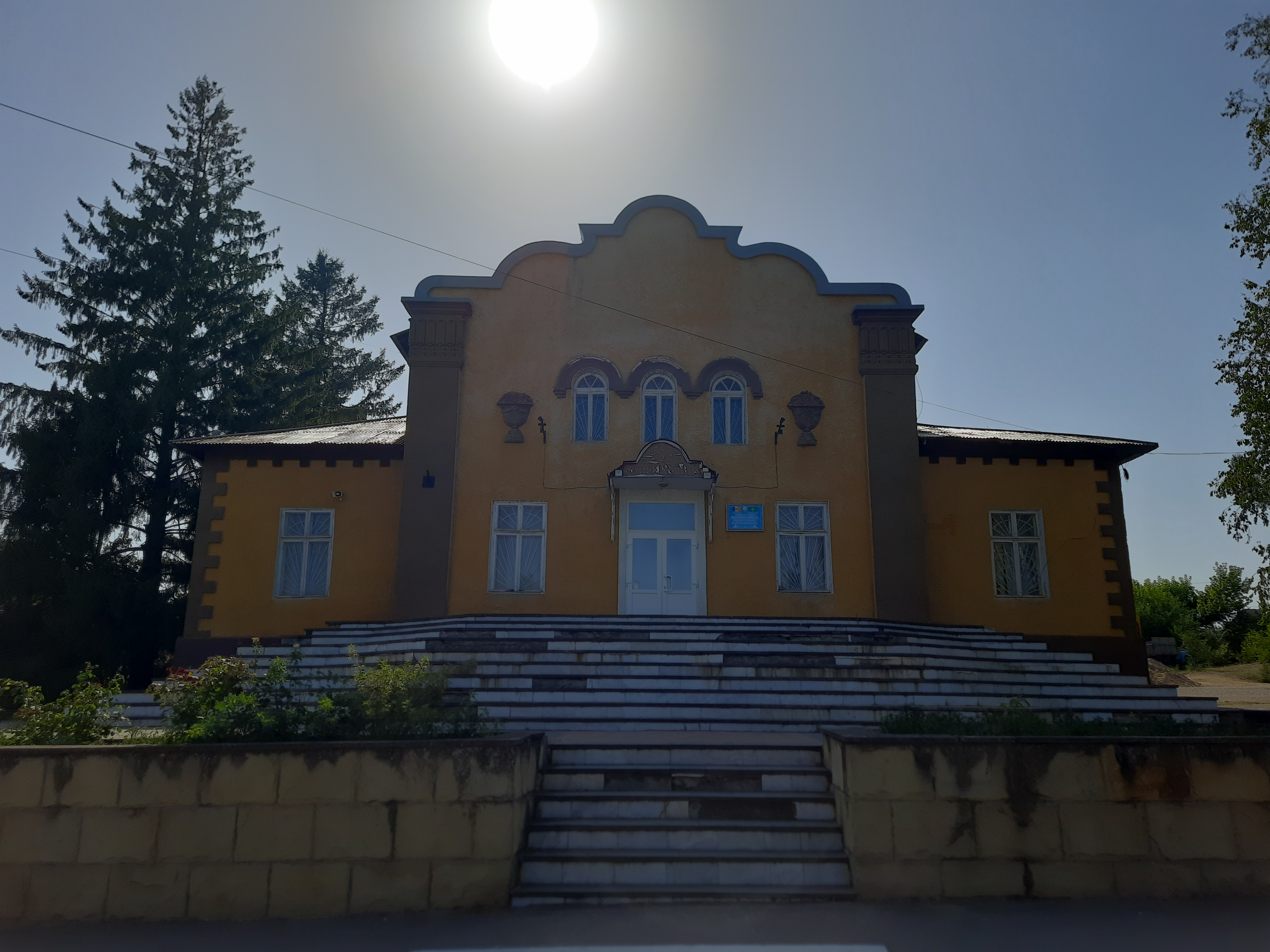
- From top, left to right: Welcome to Tvardița sign; Saint Paraskeva church; World War II memorial; Tvardița town hall; Tvardița library

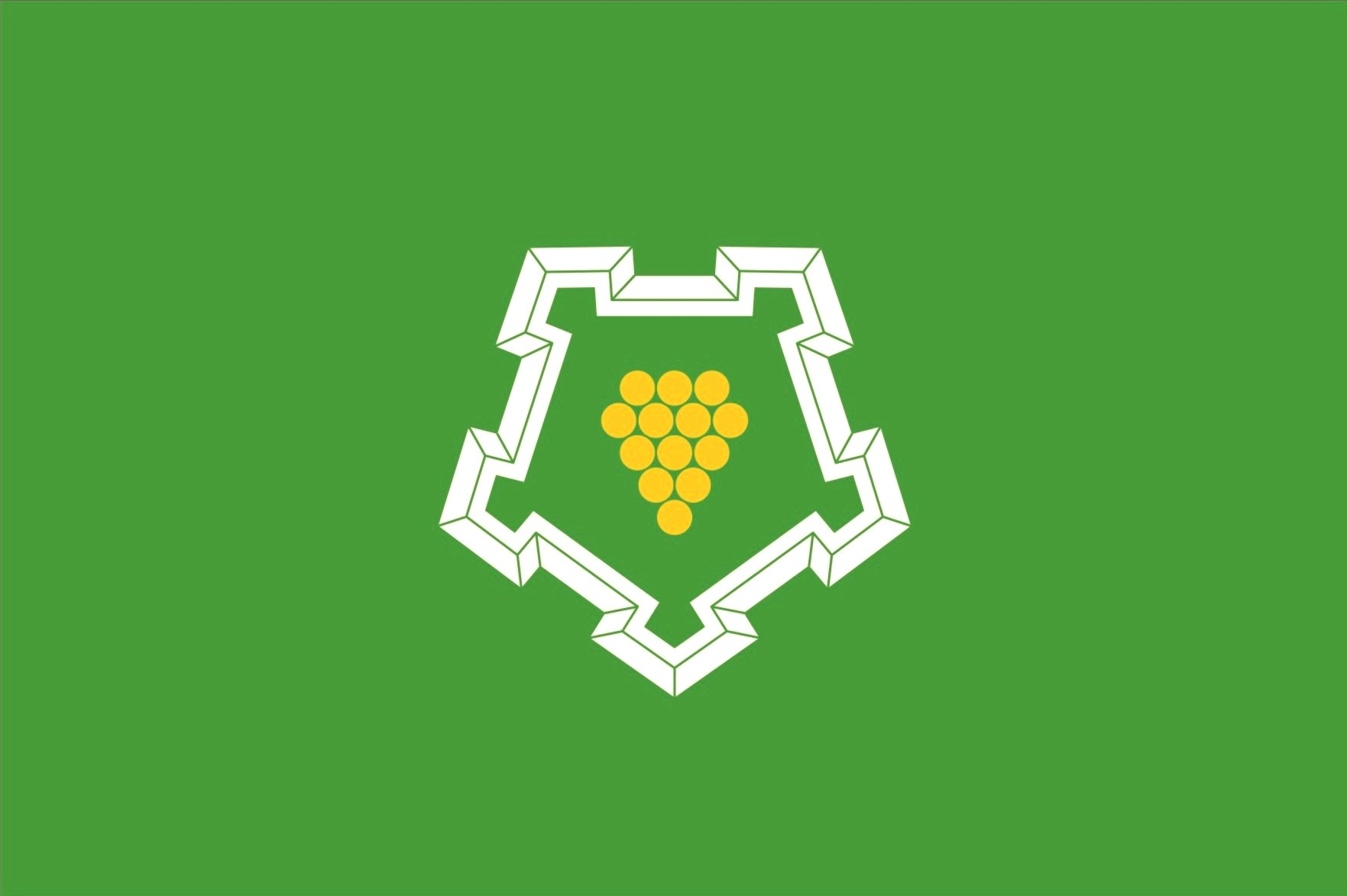
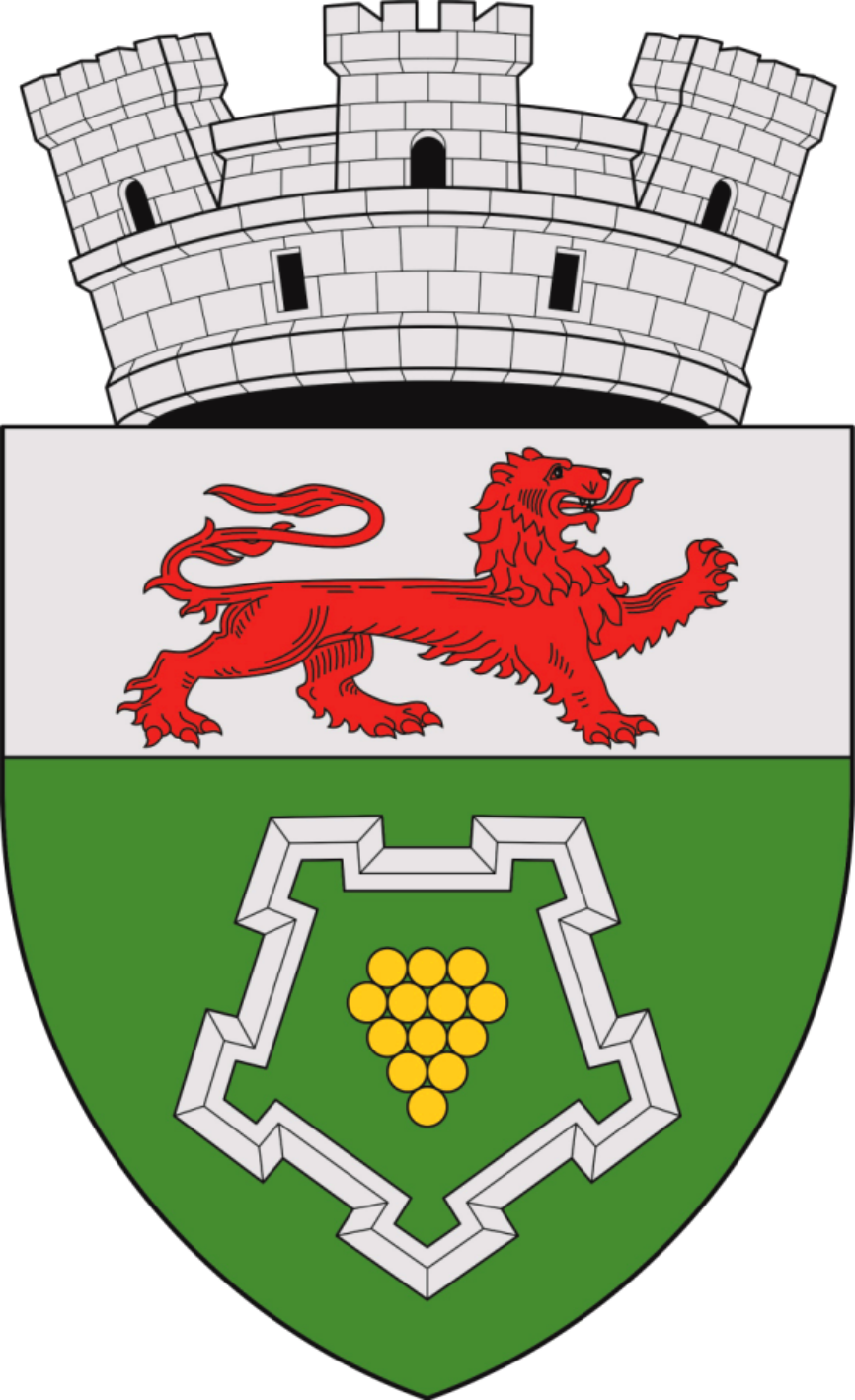
- Flag Seal
- Anthem: My Fortress
- Location of Tvardița in Moldova
- Coordinates: 46°09′N 28°58′E
- Country: Moldova
- District: Taraclia District
- Founded: 1830

Government
  - Mayor: Gheorghi Popov

Area
  - Total: 5.1 km^{2} (2.0 sq mi)

Population (2024)
  - Total: 3,503
  - Density: 690/km^{2} (1,800/sq mi)

Ethnicity (2024 census)
  - Bulgarians: 89.8%
  - Gagauz people: 4.2%
  - other: 6%
- Time zone: UTC+2 (EET)
  - Summer (DST): UTC+3 (EEST)
- Climate: Cfb
- Website: tvardita.md

Tvardița (Bulgarian: Твърдица, Tvǎrdica) is a town in Taraclia district, Moldova. The local Bulgarian population forms part of the larger group of Bessarabian Bulgarians. The town is located 40 km (25 mi) from the district seat, Taraclia, and 84 km (52 mi) from Chișinău. Together with the village of Valea Perjei it is an enclave surrounded by the Gagauzia and Odesa Oblast of Ukraine.

== History ==
The settlement of present day Tvardița was founded by Bulgarian refugees from the Ottoman Empire. The area was depopulated following the Russo-Turkish War (1806–1812) after the local Tatars were expelled from Budjak. Tvardița was officially formed around 1828–1830 and named after Tvarditsa, where most of the refugees originated from. The inhabitants formed a town council in 1834 and in 1842 a stone church was built. By the early 20th century the settlement had 3 schools, one built in 1830 and the latter two in 1908.

In 1930 the settlement had a population of 5,144 with the vast majority, 5,023 being Bulgarians.

On April 19, 2013 previously a commune, Tvardița gained the official status of a town, becoming the at the time 66th town in Moldova.

== Demographics ==
According to the 2024 census, 3,503 inhabitants lived in Tvardița, a decrease compared to the previous census in 2014, when 5,420 inhabitants were registered.

Ethnic composition of Tvardița (2024)
Ethnic group	Population	% Percentage
Bulgarians	3147	89.8%
Gagauz	148	4.2%
Moldovans (Note: There is an ongoing controversy regarding the ethnic identification of Moldovans and Romanians.)	83	2.4%
Romanians	1	0.02%
Ukrainians	46	1.3%
Russians	38	1.1%
Romani	32	0.9%
Others	8	0.2%
Total	3,503	100%

== International relations ==
=== Twin towns — Sister cities ===
Tvardița is twinned with:

- Elin Pelin, Bulgaria;
- Karlovo, Bulgaria;
