= Musaitu =

Musaitu Мусайту
- Village
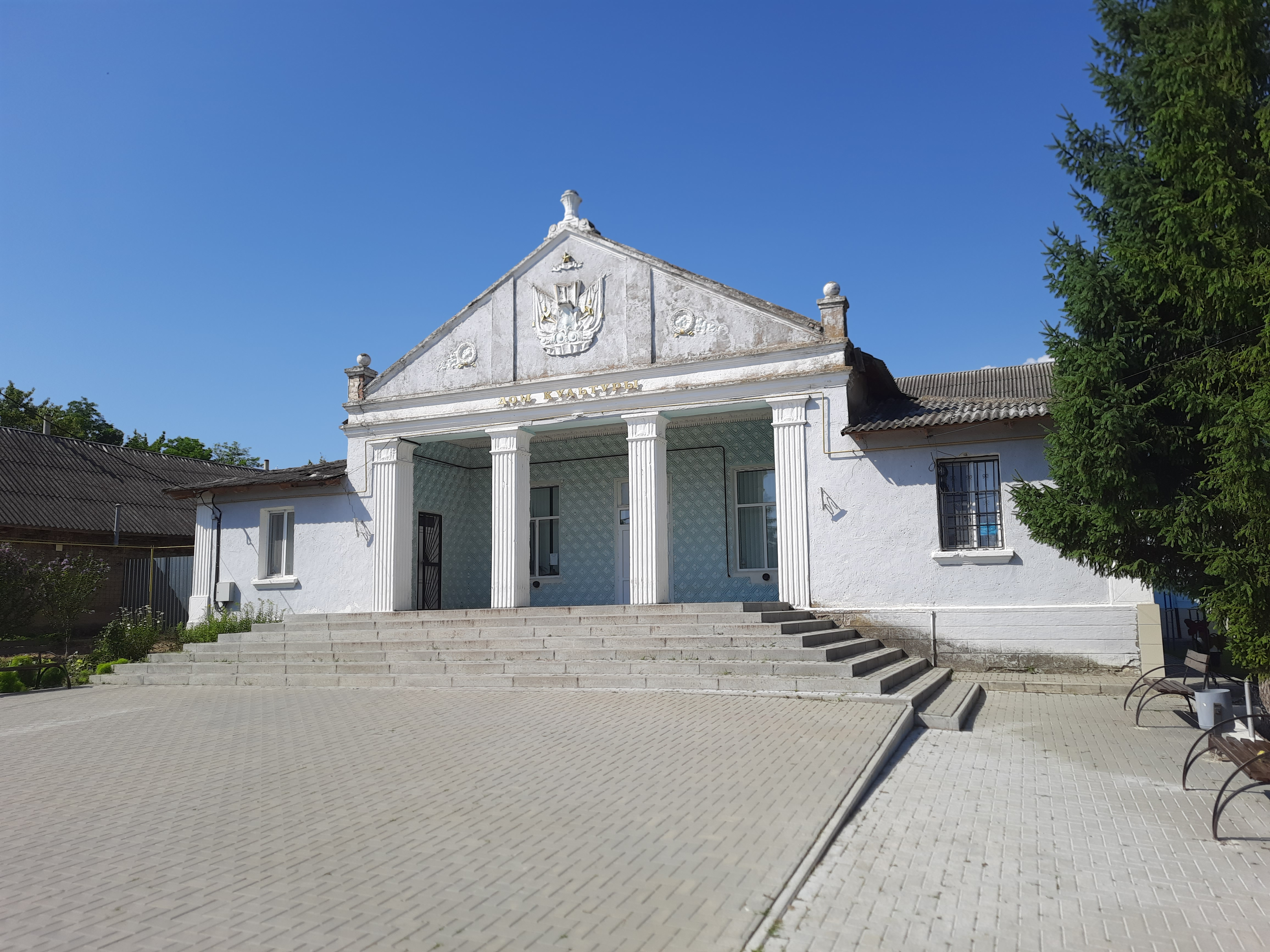
- Musaitu house of culture

- Location of Musaitu in Moldova
- Coordinates: 45°49′N 28°29′E
- Country: Moldova
- District: Taraclia District
- Founded: 1770

Government
  - Mayor: Zakhariy Fedorovich

Area
  - Total: 9.77 km^{2} (3.77 sq mi)

Population (2024)
  - Total: 554
  - Density: 56.7/km^{2} (147/sq mi)

Ethnicity (2024 census)
  - Ukrainians: 59.7%
  - Moldovans: 17%
  - other: 6.6%
- Time zone: UTC+2 (EET)
  - Summer (DST): UTC+3 (EEST)
- Climate: Cfb

Musaitu (Bulgarian: Мусайту) is a village in Taraclia District, Moldova. According to the 2024 Moldovan census the village has 554 people, 331 (59.7%) of them being Ukrainians, 94 (17%) Moldovans and 45 (8.1%) Russians. In the village, the Musaitu ravine is located, a geological and paleontological natural monument where fossils have been discovered.

== History ==
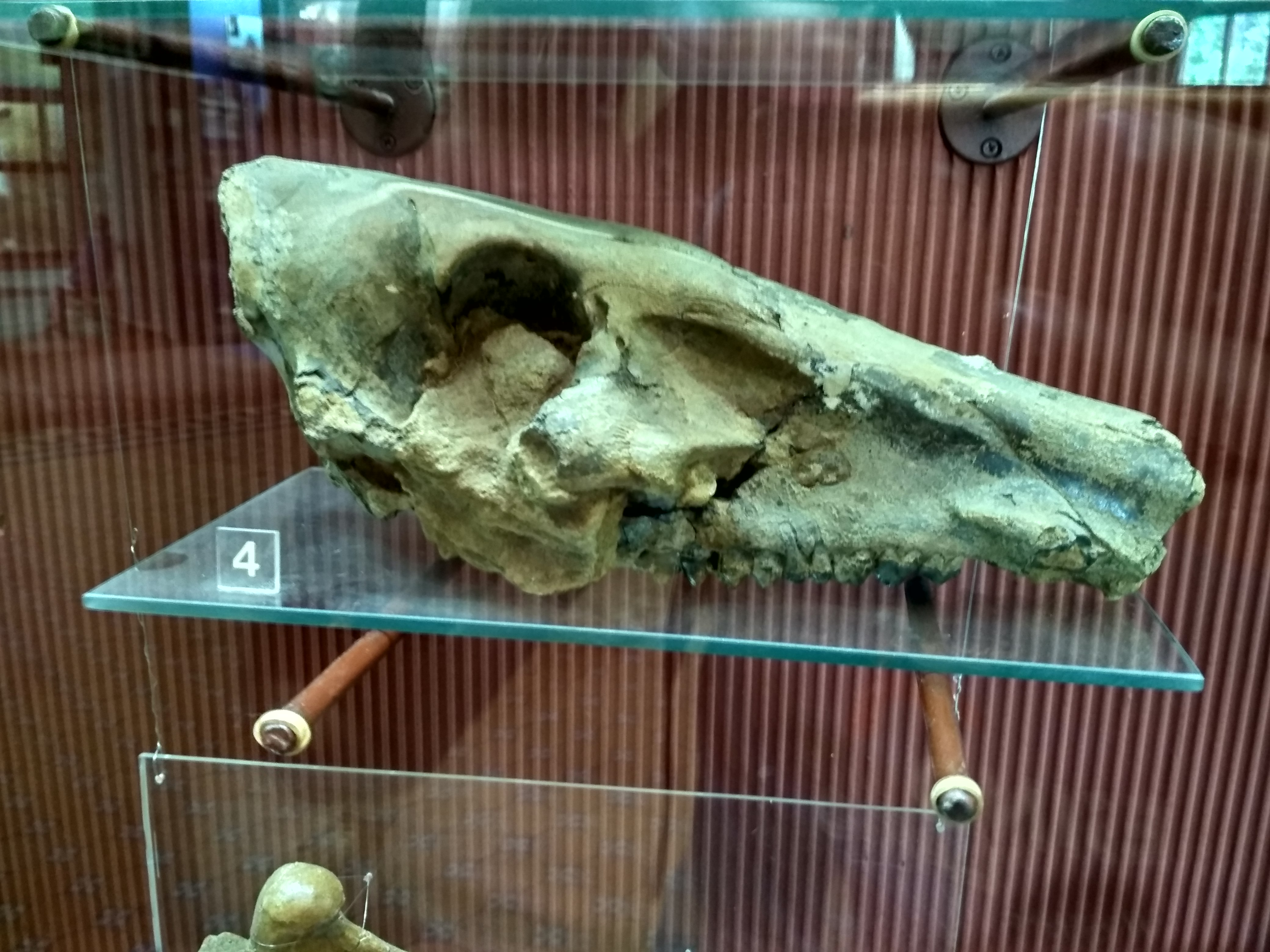
Skull of Propotamochoerus provincialis, found in the Musaitu ravine

The village was first mentioned in 1529, initially called Tomot. The modern village was formed by veterans of the Russo-Turkish wars in 1770, each veteran was awarded with 15 decares of land in the village. In 1825 a church was built, located in the northwest corner of the village. By the end of the 19th century, construction of a parish school was completed and was opened in 1890.

On the northwestern part of the village was the German colony of Paruşeni (German: Paruschowka) established in 1921 as a protestant daughter colony part of the Albota evangelical parish with 220 hectares of land. By 1939 the colony had a population of 180.

In 1940 the village had around 1110 inhabitants. During World War II, an underground group of partisans was active in the village; they were part of a central group located in the city of Cahul
