= Vinogradovca =

Vinogradovca Виноградовка
- Commune
- Location of Vinogradovca in Moldova
- Coordinates: 45°48′N 28°31′E
- Country: Moldova
- District: Taraclia District

Government
  - Mayor: Tatiana Țurcan

Population (2024)
  - Total: 1,128

Ethnicity (2024 census)
  - Gagauz people: 28.1%
  - Moldovans: 24.7%
  - other: 47.2%
- Time zone: UTC+2 (EET)
  - Summer (DST): UTC+3 (EEST)
- Climate: Cfb

Vinogradovca (Bulgarian: Виноградовка) is a commune and village in Taraclia District, Moldova. According to the 2024 Moldovan census the village has 1,128 people, 317 (28.1%) of them being Gagauz people, 279 (24.7%) Moldovans, 247 (21.9%) Ukrainians and 142 (12.6%) Bulgarians.

The commune is composed of the following villages:

- Vinogradovca (Bulgarian: Виноградовка)
- Chirilovca (Bulgarian: Кириловка)
- Ciumai (Bulgarian: Чумай)
- Mirnoe (Bulgarian: Мирное)

== History ==
=== Ciumai ===
Ciumai (Bulgarian: Чумай) has been documented as far back as 1807. It is believed that the origin of the etymology of the village comes from the Tatar word "Chum" (Чум in cyrillic) meaning tent. The present day village was founded in 1811, by 196 Bulgarian and Gagauz refugees from the Ottoman Empire. The lands around Ciumai belonged to Dmitry Fedorovich Tulchianov, a chairman of the Izmail City Council from 1911 to 1917. In the late 19th century a retired official named Alexander Zachariadi established the first vineyard in southern Bessarabia in the village of Ciumai.

In August 1940 the sovkhoz "Ciumai" was formed, which specialized in winemaking and viticulture. The farm cultivated various grape varieties like: Aligoté, Cabernet, Chasselas, Muscat and Pinot. By late 1970 new varieties like Moldova, Doina, Muscat Yantarnyi, Koroleva, Solnechnodolinsky were being cultivated, with an approximate total of 400 hectares of land being used.

=== Chirilovca ===
Chirilovca (Bulgarian: Кириловка), formerly Oytuz was founded by Ukrainian settlers from Izmail and Tatarbunary in the easly 20th century. In 1971 a branch of the winemaking sovkhoz "Jumi" was opened in the village.

=== Mirnoe ===
Mirnoe (Bulgarian: Мирное) was founded by in 1949 by Gagauz and Bulgarian families from Ciumai who were rehabilitated survivors of the Soviet deportations in Moldova. A branch of the Ciumai sovkhoz opened was opened in the village.

=== Vinogradovca ===
The village of Vinogradovca was founded in 1964 as a part of the Ciumai state farm, a winemaking sovkhoz. Alongside this the Vinogradovca village council was created, combining the villages of Vinogradovca, Chirilovca, Ciumai and Mirnoe.

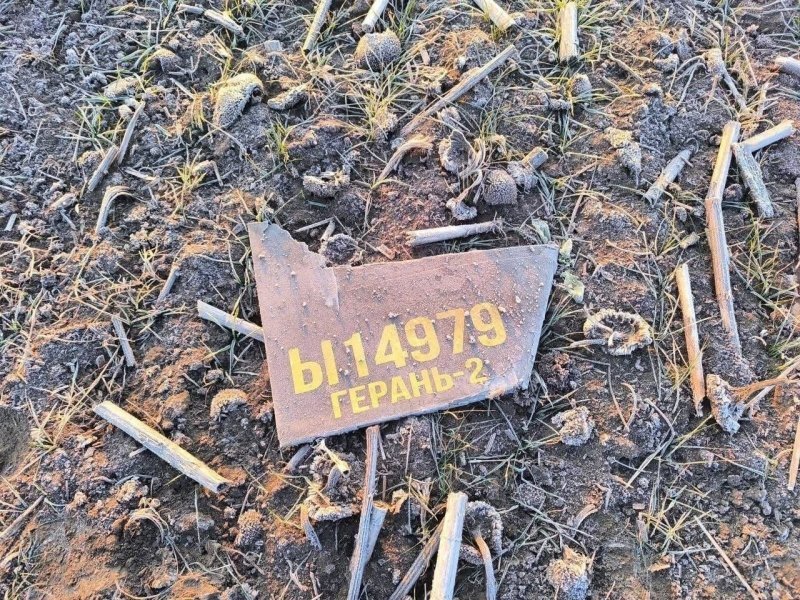
Geran-2 drone debris on 13 February 2025, near Vinogradovca

On February 12–13, 2025 several drones violated Moldovan airspace, debris belonging to a Geran-2 drone were found in the vicinity of the village after its explosion.

== Demographics ==
According to the 2024 census, 1,128 inhabitants lived in the commune of Vinogradovca, a small decrease compared to the previous census in 2014, when 1,548 inhabitants were registered.

Ethnic composition of Vinogradovca commune (2024)
Ethnic group	Population	% Percentage
Gagauz	317	28.1%
Moldovans	279	24.7%
Romanians	4	0.4
Ukrainians	247	21.9%
Bulgarians	142	12.6%
Russians	116	10.3%
Romani	6	0.5%
Others	17	1.5%
Total	1,128	100%
