= Novosiolovca =

Novosiolovca Новоселовка
- Village
- Location of Novosiolovca in Moldova
- Coordinates: 45.9°N 28.6°E
- Country: Moldova
- District: Taraclia District
- Founded: 1964

Government
  - Mayor: Ecaterina Iacobceac

Area
  - Total: 25.7 km^{2} (9.9 sq mi)

Population (2024)
  - Total: 842
  - Density: 32.8/km^{2} (84.9/sq mi)

Ethnicity (2024 census)
  - Bulgarians: 44.1%
  - Gagauz: 22.6%
  - other: 33.3%
- Time zone: UTC+2 (EET)
  - Summer (DST): UTC+3 (EEST)
- Climate: Cfb

Novosiolovca (Bulgarian: Новоселовка) is a village in Taraclia District, Moldova. According to the 2024 Moldovan census the village has 842 people, 371 (44.1%) of them being Bulgarians, 190 (22.6%) Gagauz and 117 (13.9%) Moldovans.

== Administration and local government ==
Novosiolovca is governed by a local council composed of nine members. The most recent local elections, in November 2023, resulted in the following composition: 8 councillors from the Party of Socialists of the Republic of Moldova and 1 councillor from the Party of Communists of the Republic of Moldova. The Political also ran, but didn't receive enough votes to select a councillor. In the same elections, the candidate from the Party of Socialists of the Republic of Moldova, Ecaterina Iacobceac, was elected as mayor, winning all of the vote.
