= Flag of Taraclia District =

Moldovan regional flag

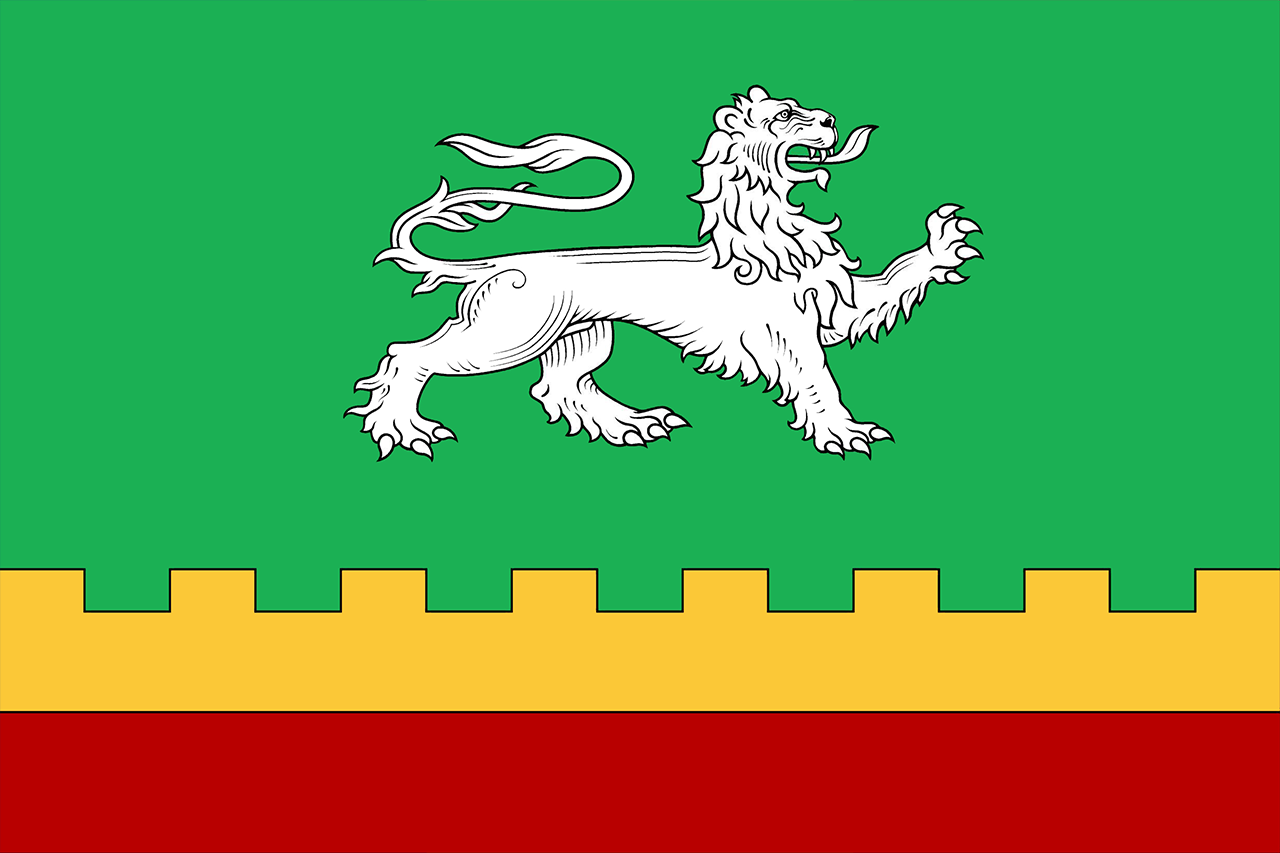
- Use: Civil
- Proportion: 2:3
- Adopted: November 22, 2021

The flag of Taraclia District is the official flag of the Taraclia District, Moldova. The flag consists of a green field with a silver lion passant, a golden crenellated line and red line at the bottom.

== Design ==
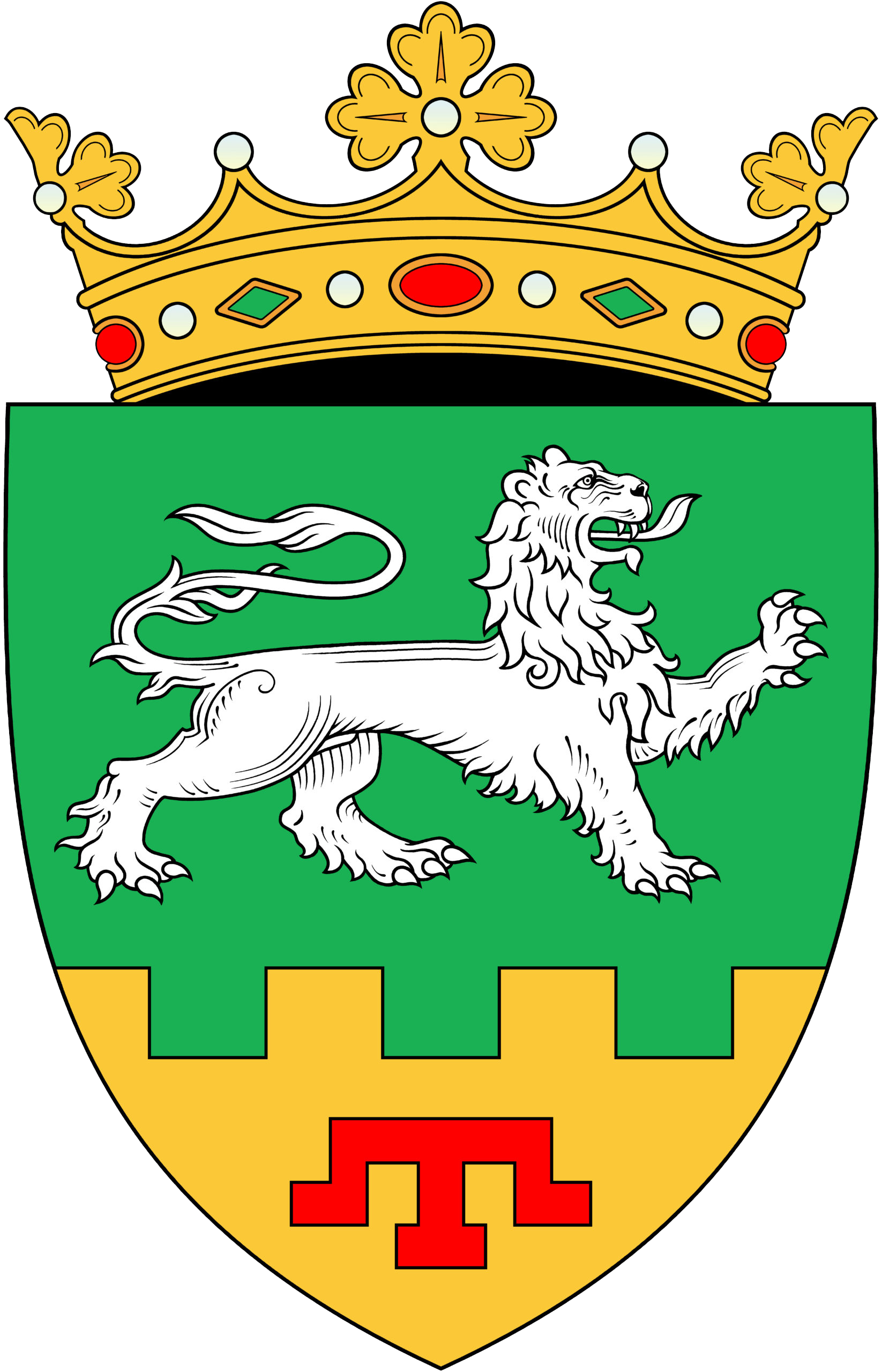
Coat of arms of Taraclia District

The flag of Taraclia District has a rectangular design with a 2:3 ratio. A green upper field with a white-and-silver leopard-lion. The marching lion is the symbol of Bulgarian autonomy in southern Bessarabia, historically adopted in 1856 by the Moldavian Principality. On the bottom of the flag is a red line. White, green and red are considered Bulgarian colors, reflecting the Bulgarian majority of the district. On the lower-middle half of the flag is a golden crenellated line, representing Trajan's Wall, a Roman fortification on the frontier, specifically Athanaric's Wall that went through the southeastern part of the present-day district. The flag is based on the previous coat of arms of the Taraclia County, which existed from 1999 to 2003.

== History ==
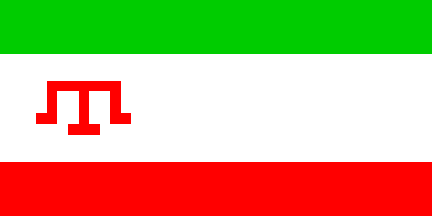
Flag of Taraclia County (1999–2003)

The flag was preceded by the flag of Taraclia County. Consisting of green, white and red, closely resembling the flag of Bulgaria. The left half of the flag featured a red Tamga, a symbol of the Giray dynasty, used by Crimean Tatars, symbolizing the Tatar history of the area under the Budjak Horde. Following an administrative reform in 2003, Taraclia County was reformed into Taraclia District and the flag and coat of arms lost its official status.

The flag of the Disctrict of Taraclia was adopted on November 22, 2021, by an official decree alongside the coat of arms of Taraclia Disctrict. The decree came into effect on November 26, 2021, becoming the official flag day in Taraclia District.
