= Budăi, Taraclia =

Budăi Будей
- Commune
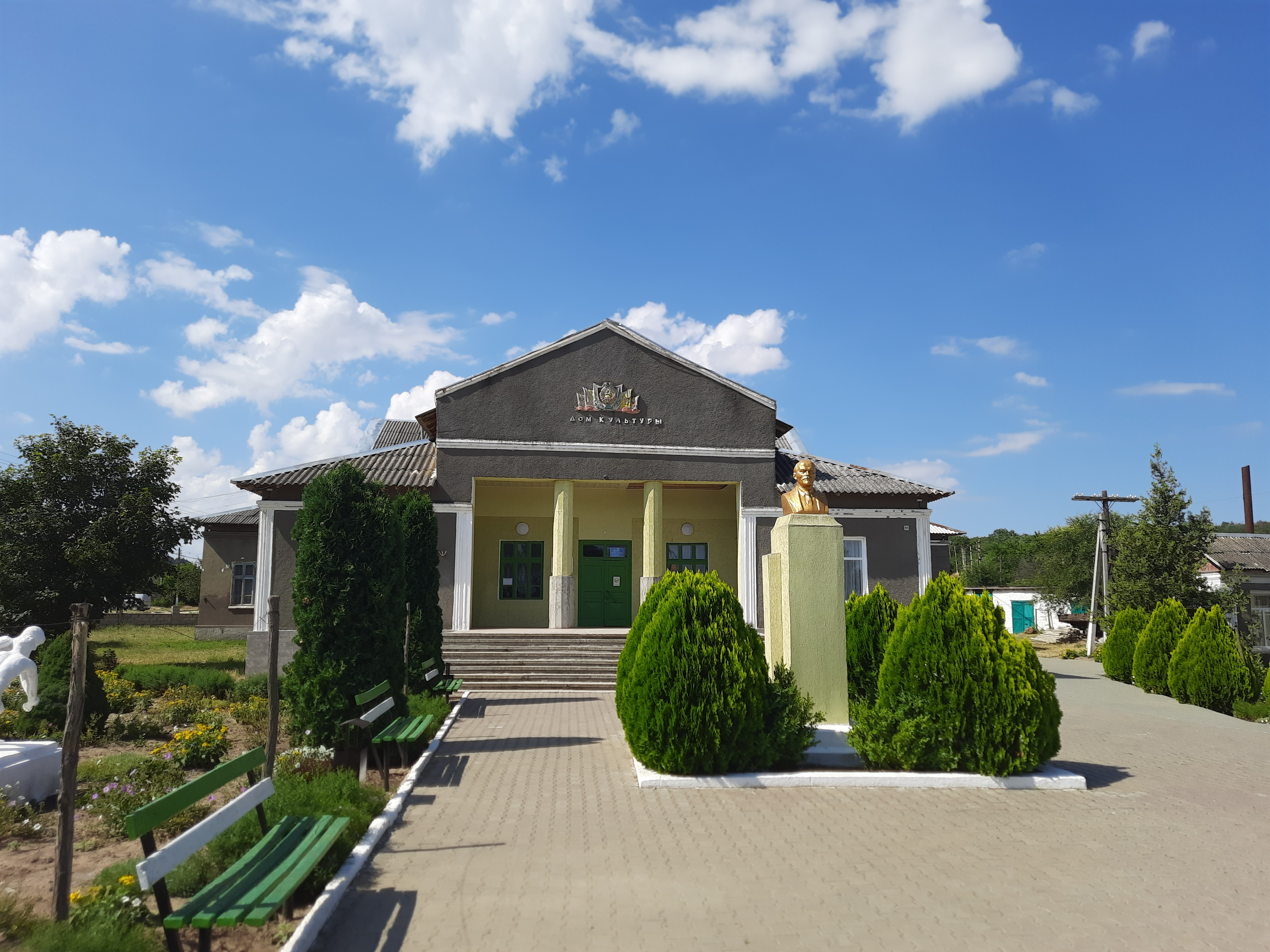
- Budăi house of culture

- Location of Budăi in Moldova
- Coordinates: 45.85°N 28.46°E
- Country: Moldova
- District: Taraclia District

Government
  - Mayor: Galina Terzi

Population (2024)
  - Total: 633

Ethnicity (2024 census)
  - Moldovans: 40.9%
  - Bulgarians: 18.6%
  - other: 40.5%
- Time zone: UTC+2 (EET)
  - Summer (DST): UTC+3 (EEST)
- Climate: Cfb

Budăi (Bulgarian: Будей) is a commune and village in Taraclia District, Moldova. According to the 2024 Moldovan census the village has 591 people, 242 (40.9%) of them being Moldovans, 110 (18.6%) Bulgarians, 98 (16.6%) Ukrainians.

The commune is composed of the following villages:

- Budăi (Bulgarian: Будей)
- Dermengi (Bulgarian: Дерменджи)

== History ==
The village of Budăi was formed in the early 19th century. According to legend the area was settled by a Hungarian called Budda, which the village derives its name from. In 1944 an elementary school was opened in the village. In 1949 it was reformed into a seven-year school and in 2021 to a highschool. In 2000 a church named after Demetrius of Thessaloniki was opened.

Dermengi (Bulgarian: Дерменджи) was first documented in 1878, the toponym for the village is thought to come from the Gagauz word for mill. Since the formation of Autonomous Territorial Unit of Gagauzia, it has been an enclave surrounded by the enclave of Carbalia and Cahul District.

== Demographics ==
According to the 2024 census, 591 inhabitants lived in the commune of Budăi, a decrease compared to the previous census in 2014, when 834 inhabitants were registered.

Ethnic composition of Budăi commune (2024)
Ethnic group	Population	% Percentage
Moldovans	242	40.9%
Romanians	2	0.3%
Bulgarians	110	18.6%
Ukrainians	98	16.6%
Russians	81	13.7%
Gagauz	53	9.0%
Others	5	0.8%
Total	591	100%
