= Albota de Jos =

Albota de Jos Долна Албота
- Commune
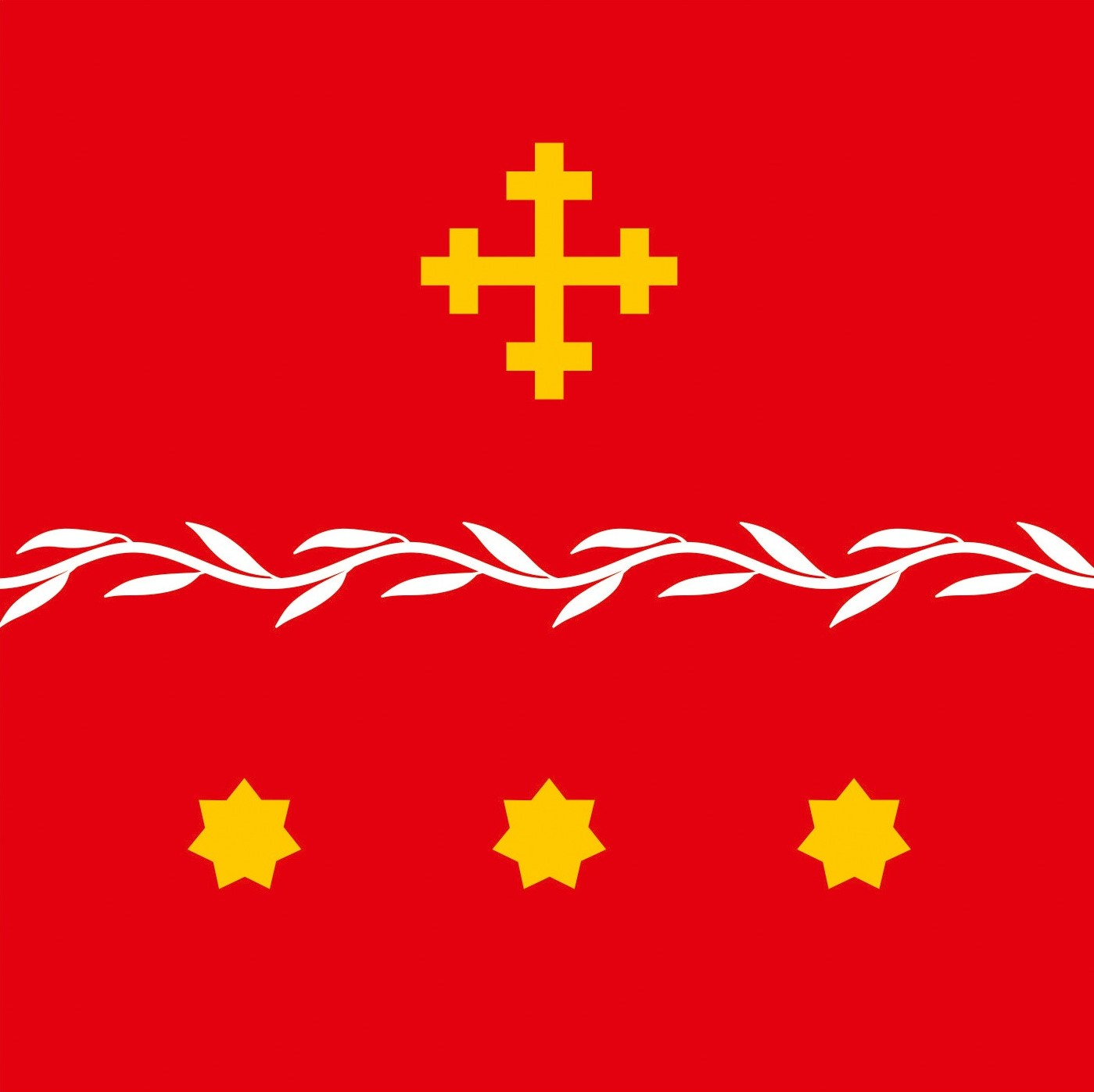
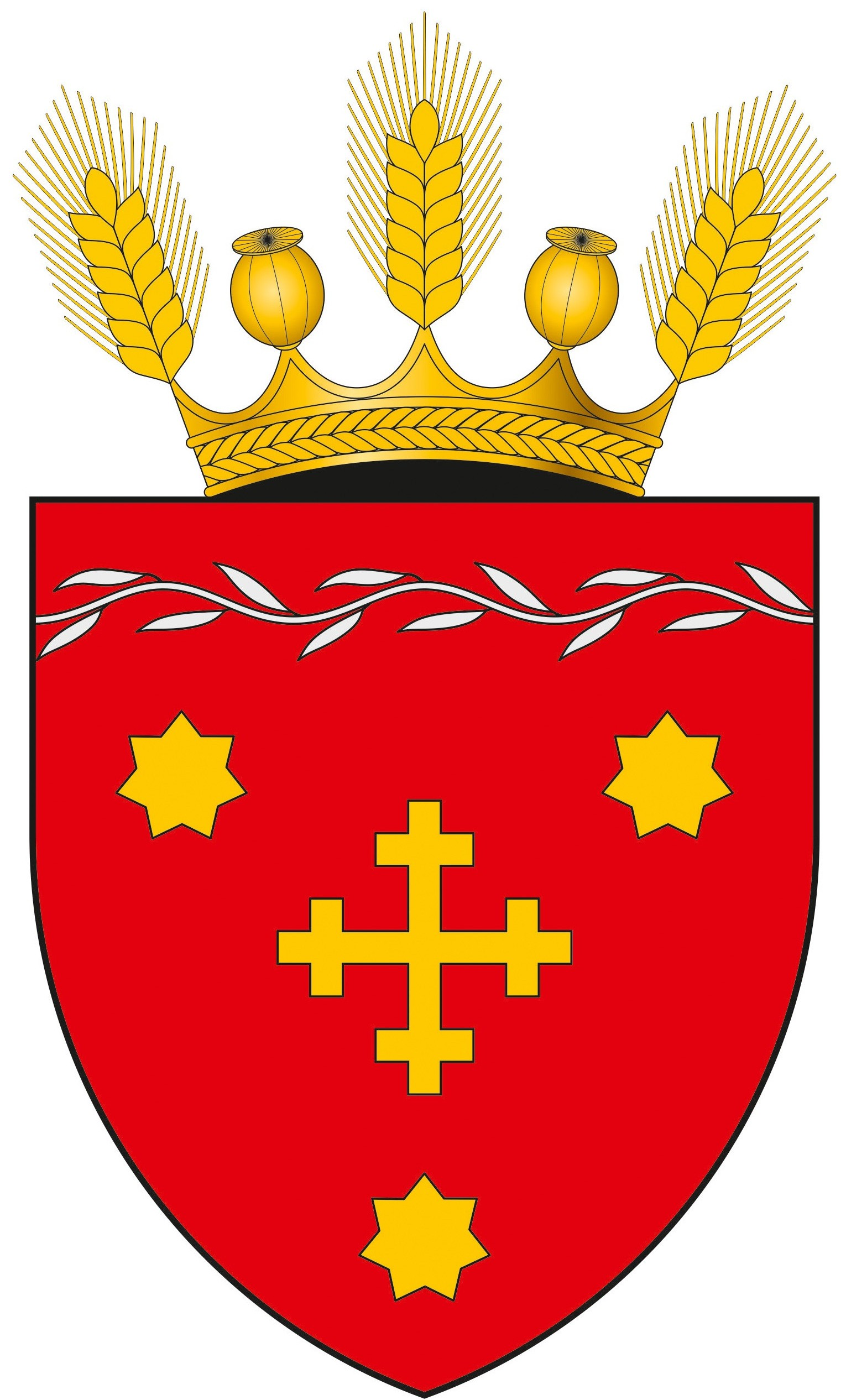
- Flag Seal

- Location of Albota de Jos in Moldova
- Coordinates: 45.933°N 28.483°E
- Country: Moldova
- District: Taraclia District

Government
  - Mayor: Vitalie Tataru

Population (2024)
  - Total: 952

Ethnicity (2024 census)
  - Moldovans: 51.3%
  - Bulgarians: 38.0%
  - other: 10.7%
- Time zone: UTC+2 (EET)
  - Summer (DST): UTC+3 (EEST)
- Climate: Cfb

Albota de Jos (Bulgarian: Долна Албота Russian: Нижняя Албота, Албота-де-Жос) is a commune and village in Taraclia District, Moldova. According to the 2024 Moldovan census the village has 952 people, 488 (51.3%) of them being Moldovans, 362 (38%) Bulgarians.

The commune is located 18 km (11 mi) from the district seat, Taraclia, and 144 km (89 mi) from Chișinău.

During the interwar period, the commune was the seat of Plasa Mihai Viteazul, in Cahul County, Romania.

The commune is composed of the following villages:

- Albota de Jos (Bulgarian: Долна Албота)
- Hagichioi (Bulgarian: Хаджикьой)
- Hîrtop (Bulgarian: Хъртоп)

== History ==
Hagichioi (Bulgarian: Хаджикьой) derives its name from the Turkic as "Hagi-koy" and has been mentioned as far back as 1803.

Albota de Jos (Bulgarian: Долна Албота German: Unter-Albota, Albota de Yos, Albota de Jos) is believed to originally be a Tatar settlement, the name of the village comes from the name of the Tatar tribe "Akbota". Following the expulsion of the Tatars, the village was inhabited by Bulgarians from Horodnje (Ukrainian: Городнее). In 1919, a German Lutheran daughter colony was founded in the area and became a part of the Albota parish. The Germans had been living in the village on rented land since 1880. In 1939 prior to the evacuation of the Bessarabia Germans the village had a population of 181.

Hîrtop (Bulgarian: Хъртоп) was founded in 1921 as a part of Albota de Jos, with a majority Moldovan population.

On December 2025 the commune of Albota de Jos officially adopted individual flags and seals for each of its villages and the commune as a whole.

== Demographics ==
According to the 2024 census, 952 inhabitants lived in the commune of Albota de Jos, a decrease compared to the previous census in 2014, when 1,425 inhabitants were registered.

Ethnic composition of Albota de Jos commune (2024)
Ethnic group	Population	% Percentage
Moldovans	488	51.3%
Romanians	10	1.1%
Bulgarians	362	38.0%
Russians	42	4.4%
Gagauz	40	4.2%
Ukrainians	7	0.7%
Romani	3	0.3%
Total	952	100%

== Gallery ==
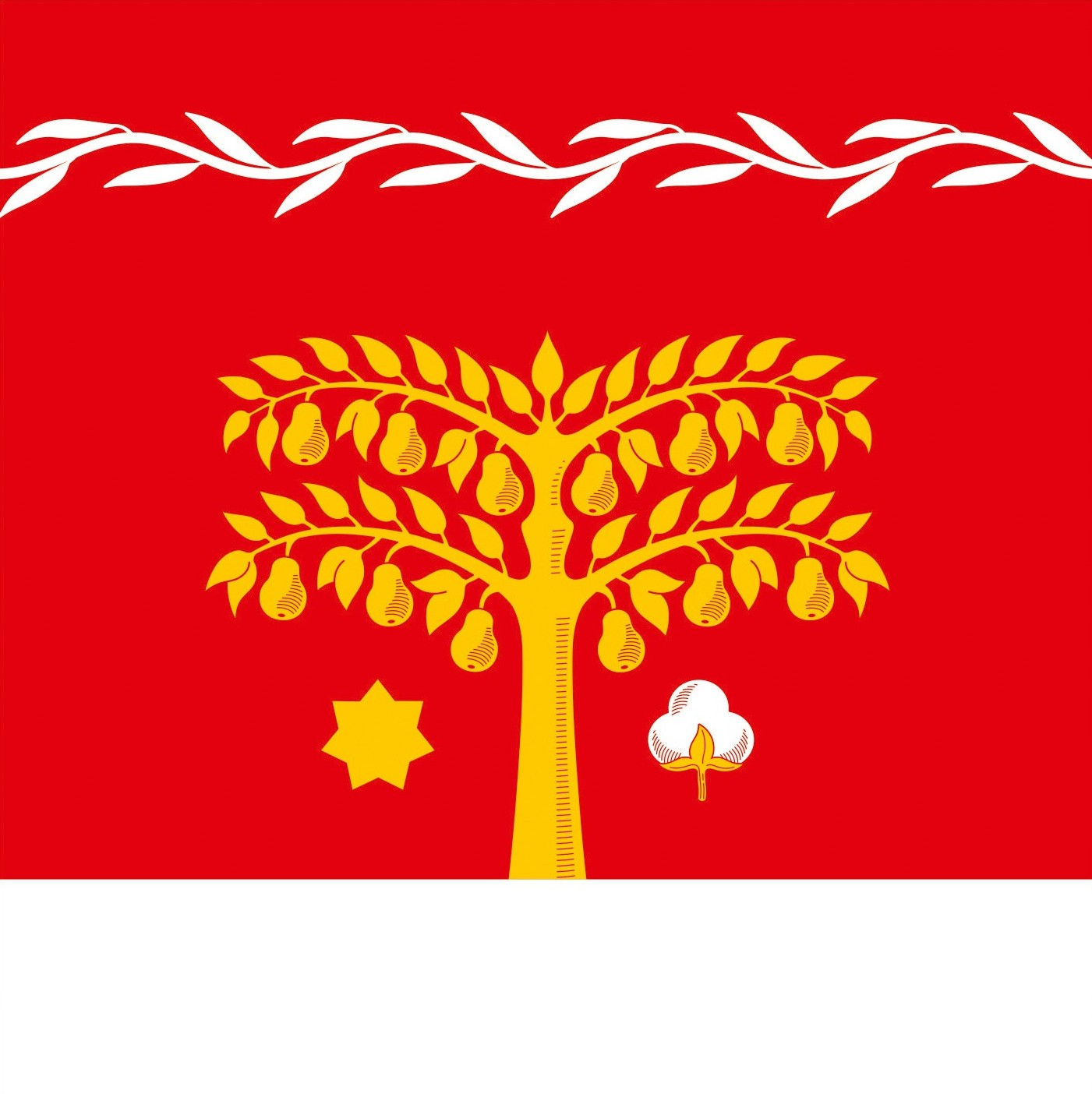
Flag of the Albota de Jos (village)

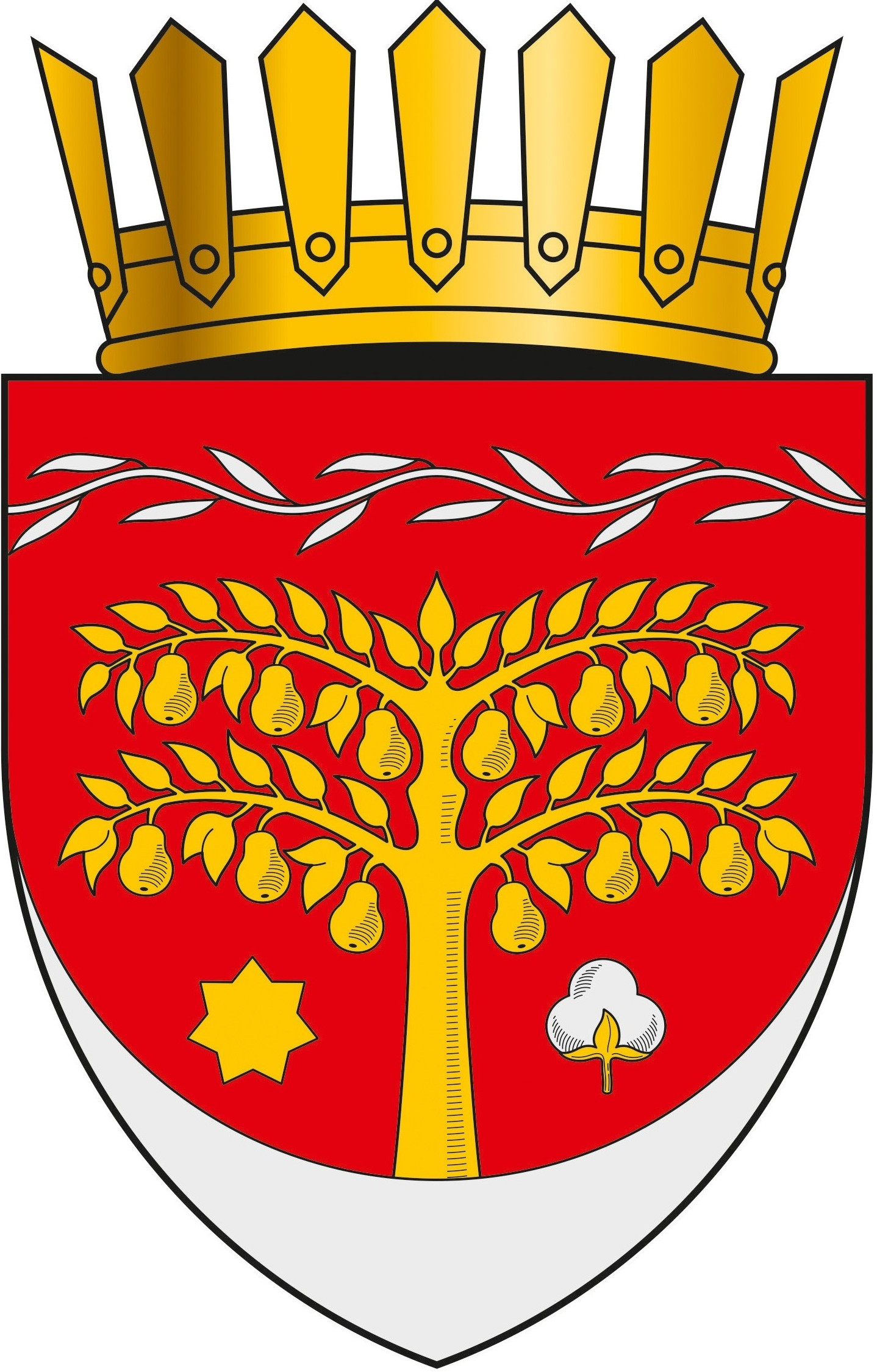
Seal of the Albota de Jos (village)

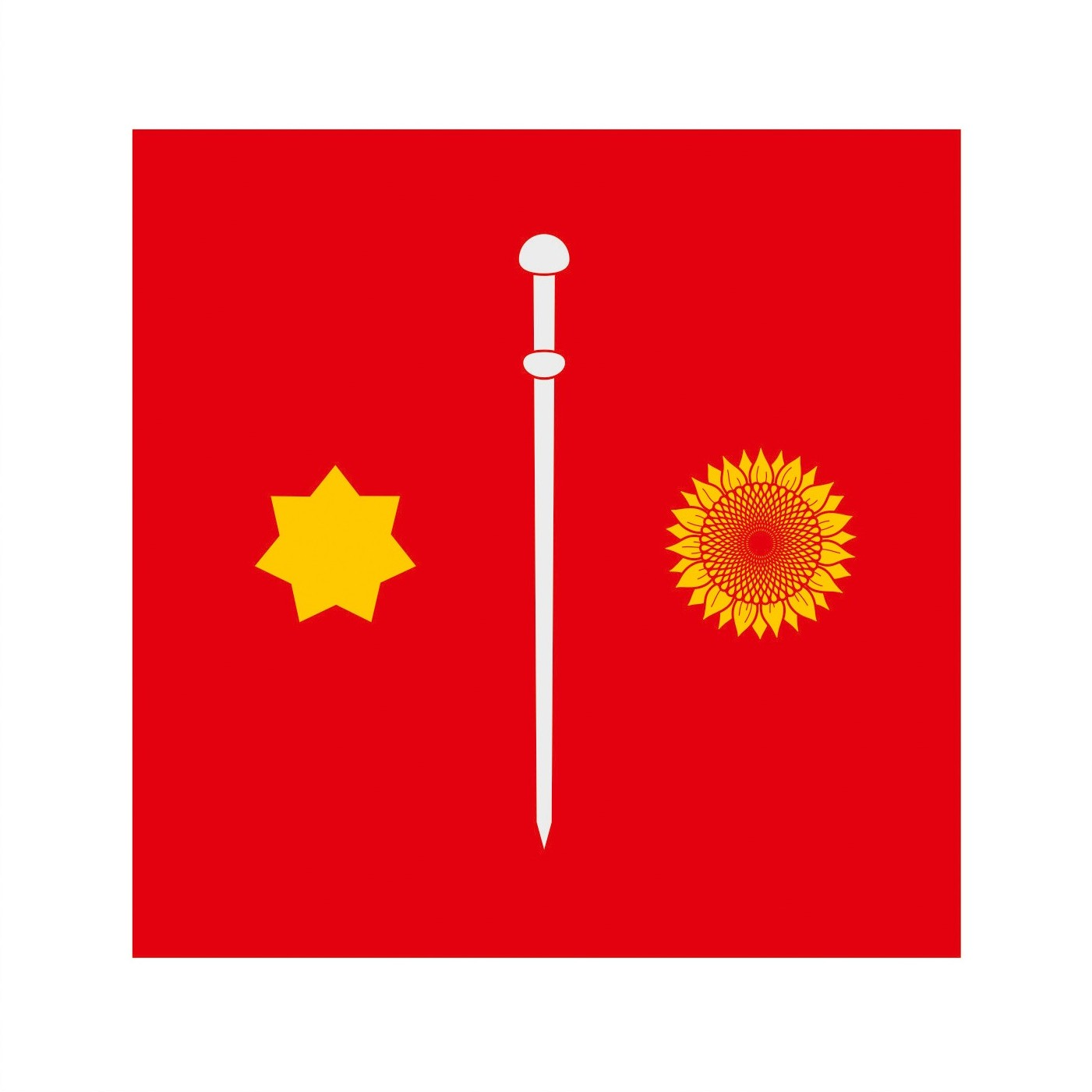
Flag of the Hagichioi

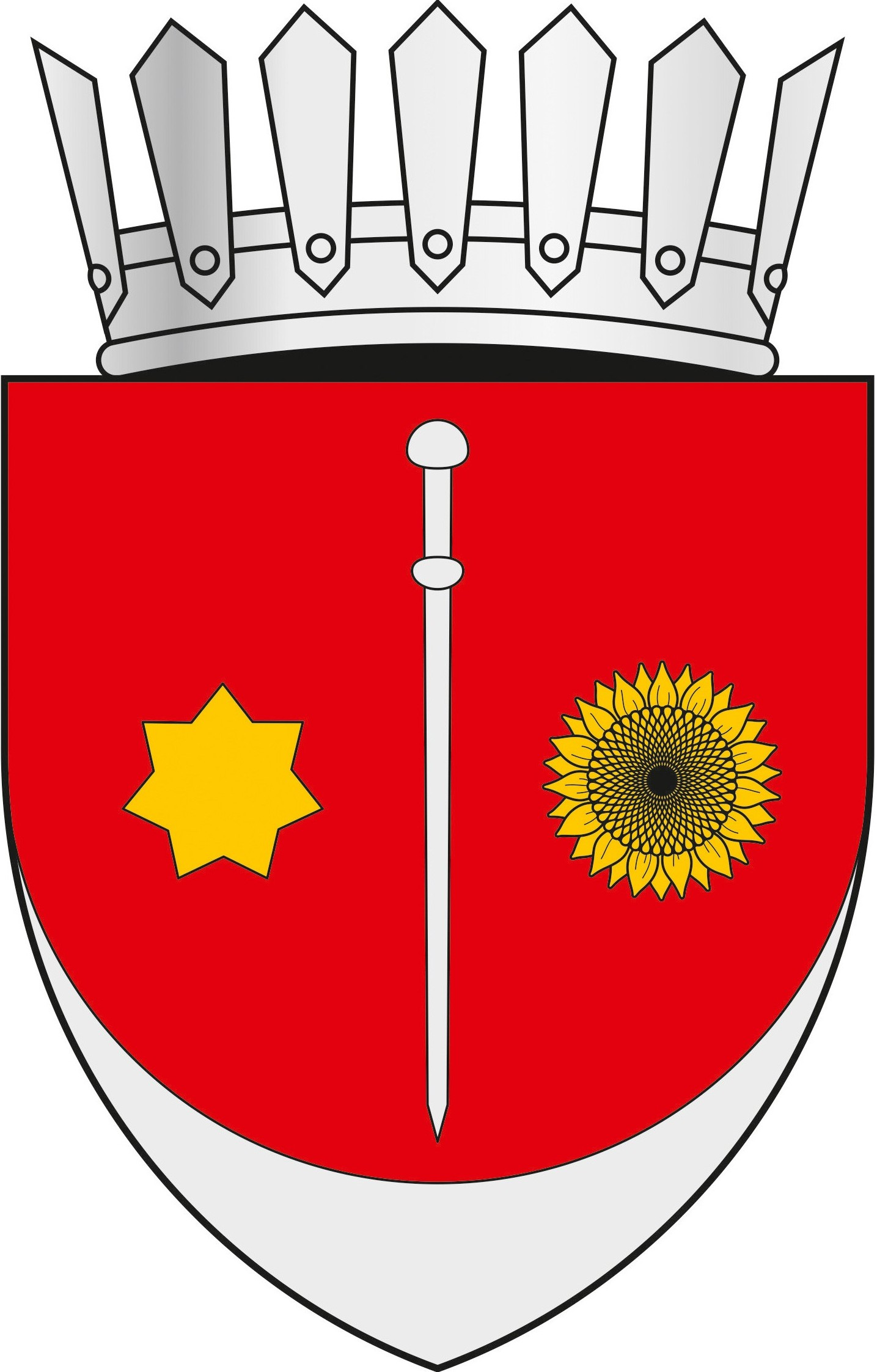
Seal of the Hagichioi

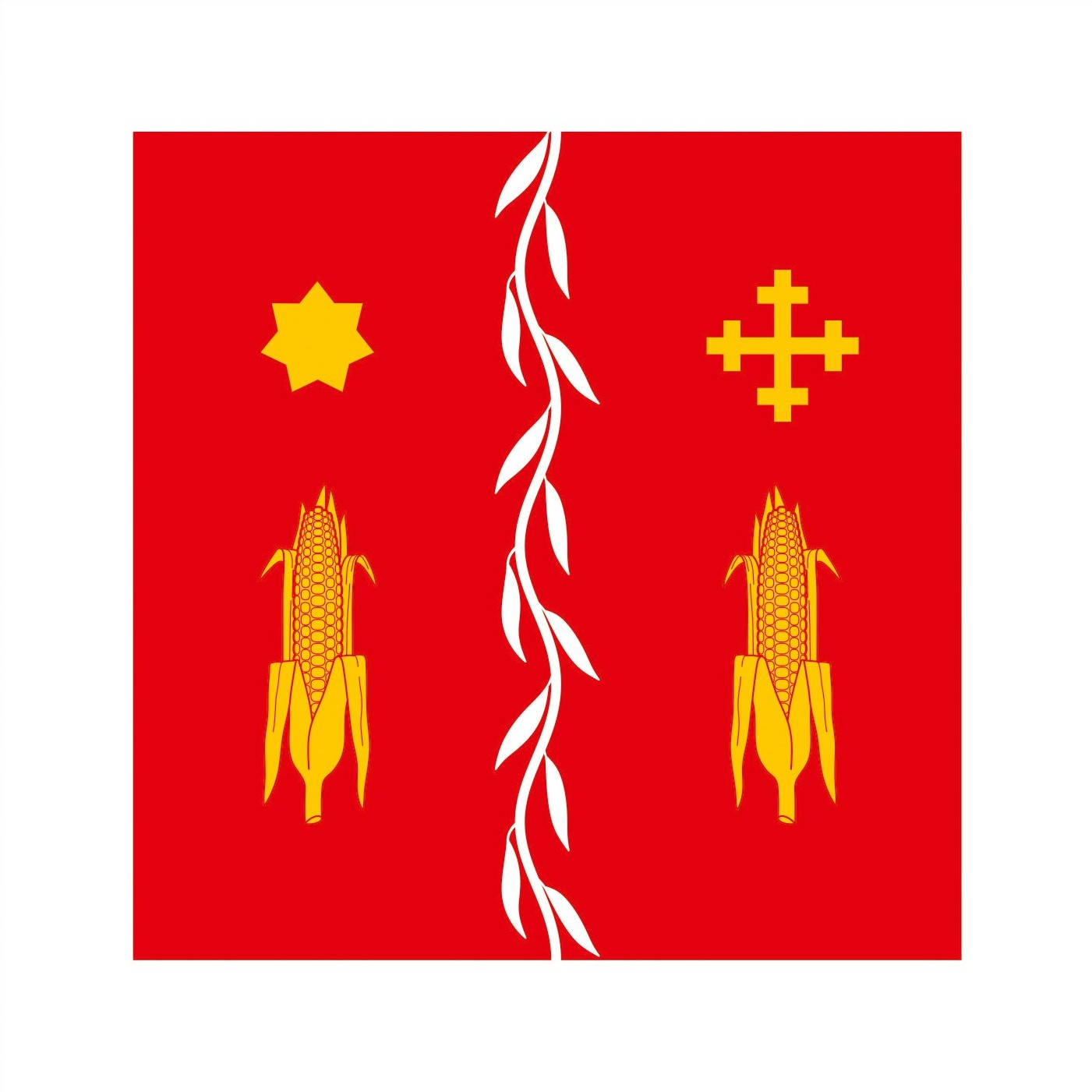
Flag of the Hîrtop

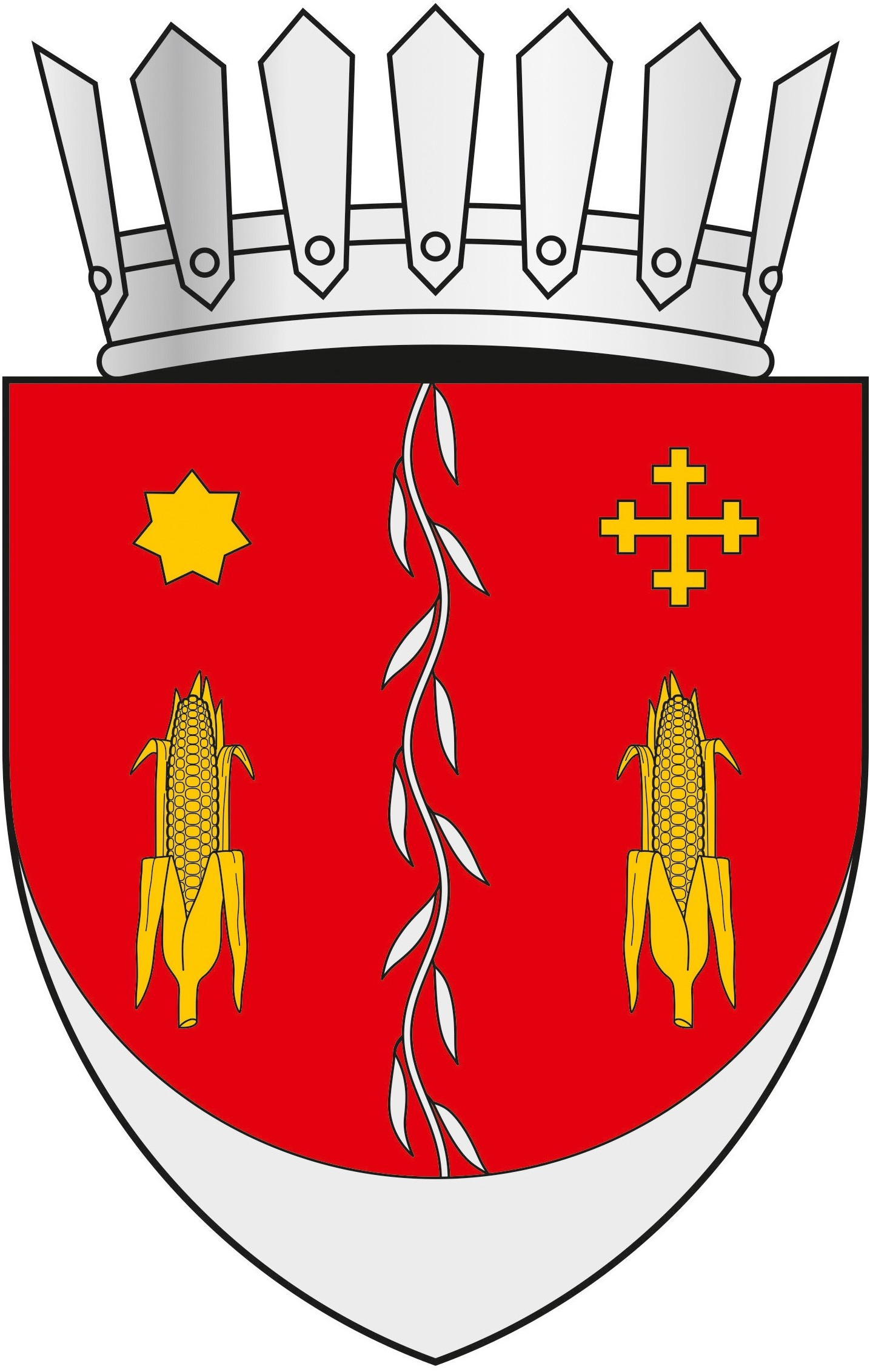
Seal of the Hîrtop
