= Cairaclia =

Cairaclia Кортен
- Village
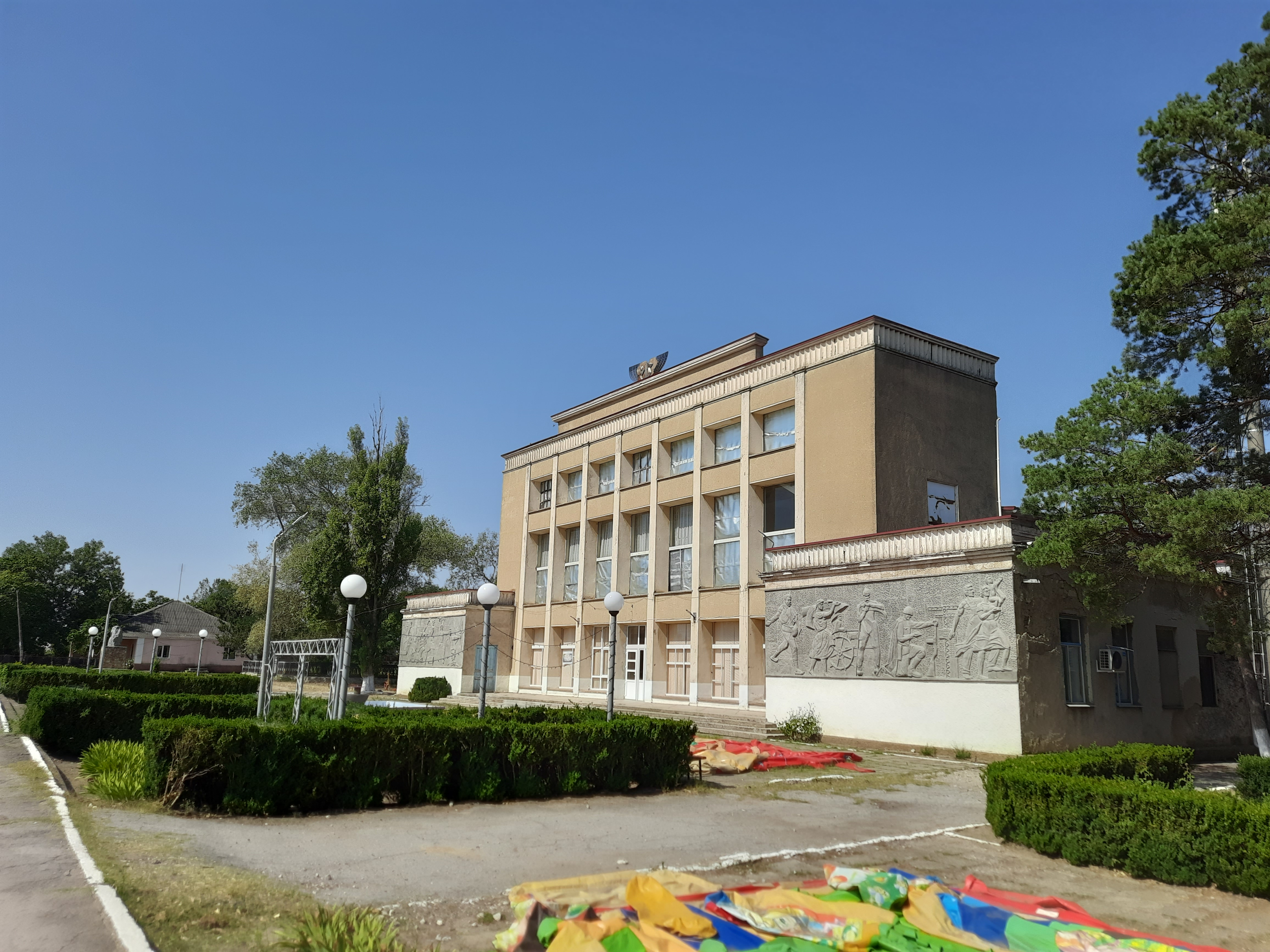
- Cairaclia house of culture

- Location of Cairaclia in Moldova
- Coordinates: 45.767°N 28.617°E
- Country: Moldova
- District: Taraclia District
- Founded: 1861

Government
  - Mayor: Nicolai Caracaș

Area
  - Total: 2.49 km^{2} (0.96 sq mi)

Population (2024)
  - Total: 1,154
  - Density: 463/km^{2} (1,200/sq mi)

Ethnicity (2024 census)
  - Bulgarians: 72.9%
  - Gagauz people: 14.9%
  - other: 12.2%
- Time zone: UTC+2 (EET)
  - Summer (DST): UTC+3 (EEST)
- Climate: Cfb

Cairaclia (Bulgarian: Кортен) is a village in Taraclia District, Moldova. According to the 2024 Moldovan census the village has 1,154 people, 841 (72.9%) of them being Bulgarians, 172 (14.9%) Gagauz people and 57 (4.9%) Moldovans.

== History ==
The settlement was founded in 1861 in the place of a tatar farmstead called Katerlyk. By 1877, there were 733 inhabitants in the village. In 1866 a stone church was built in the place of a wooden one.
