= Aluatu =

Aluatu Алуату
- Village
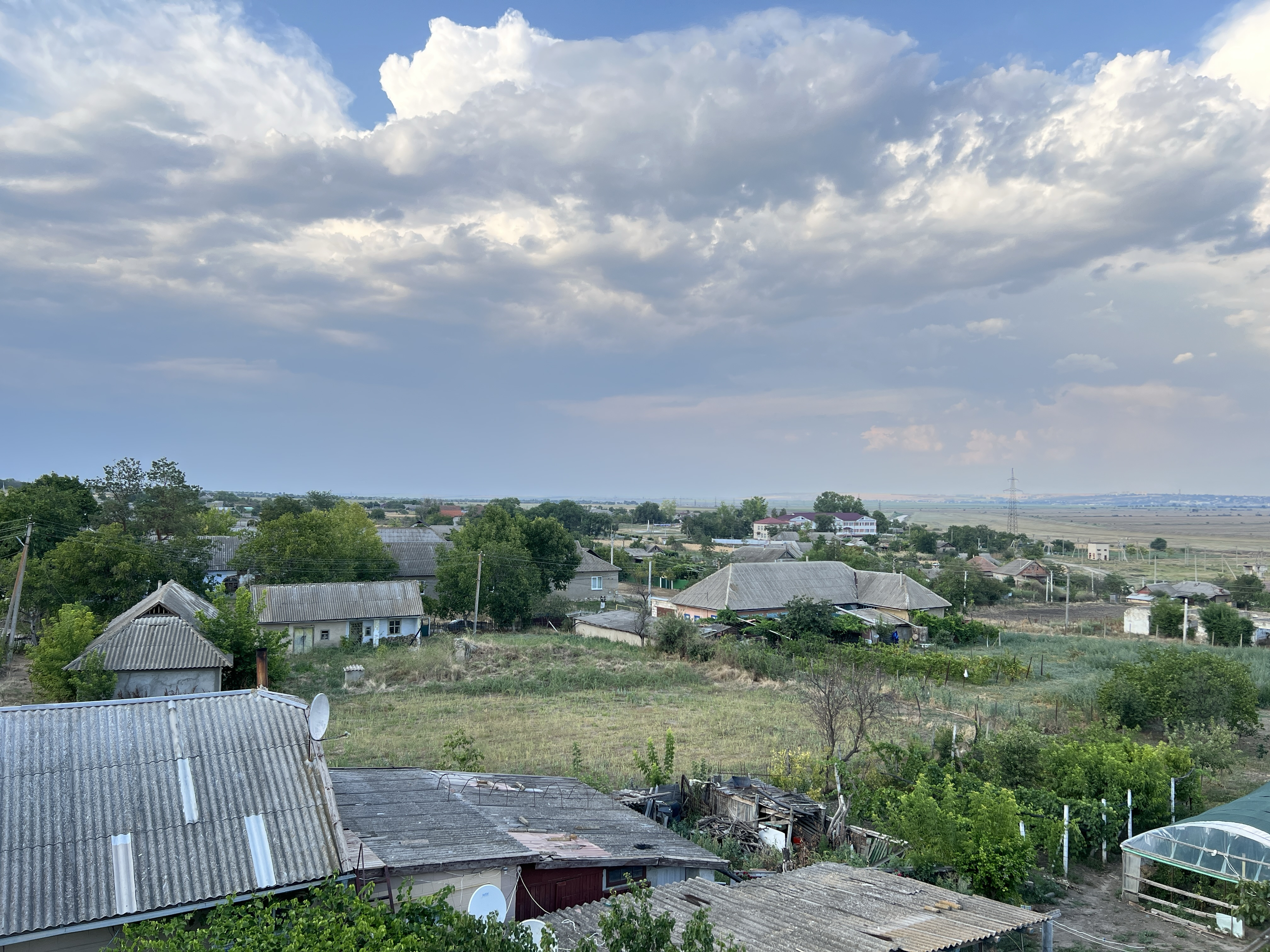
- View of Aluatu Village

- Location of Aluatu in Moldova
- Coordinates: 45°52′N 28°35′E
- Country: Moldova
- District: Taraclia District
- Founded: 1806

Government
  - Mayor: Anatolie Gusarenco

Area
  - Total: 1.55 km^{2} (0.60 sq mi)

Population (2024)
  - Total: 497
  - Density: 321/km^{2} (830/sq mi)

Ethnicity (2024 census)
  - Moldovans: 62.2%
  - Gagauz people: 26.0%
  - other: 11.8%
- Time zone: UTC+2 (EET)
  - Summer (DST): UTC+3 (EEST)
- Climate: Cfb

Aluatu (Bulgarian: Алуату) is a village in Taraclia District, Moldova. According to the 2024 Moldovan census the village has 497 people, 309 (62.2%) of them being Moldovans, 129 (26.0%) Bulgarians and 18 (3.6%) Gagauz people.

== History ==
First official documentation of the village goes back to 1806, the name of the settlement is most likely of Tatar origin. After the expulsion of the Budjak Tatars, the village was inhabited by Moldovans from Hîncești alongside Bulgarian and Gagauz refugees from the Ottoman Empire. In 1879, a stone church was built in the village.
