= Valea Perjei, Taraclia =

Valea Perjei Валя Пержей
- Village
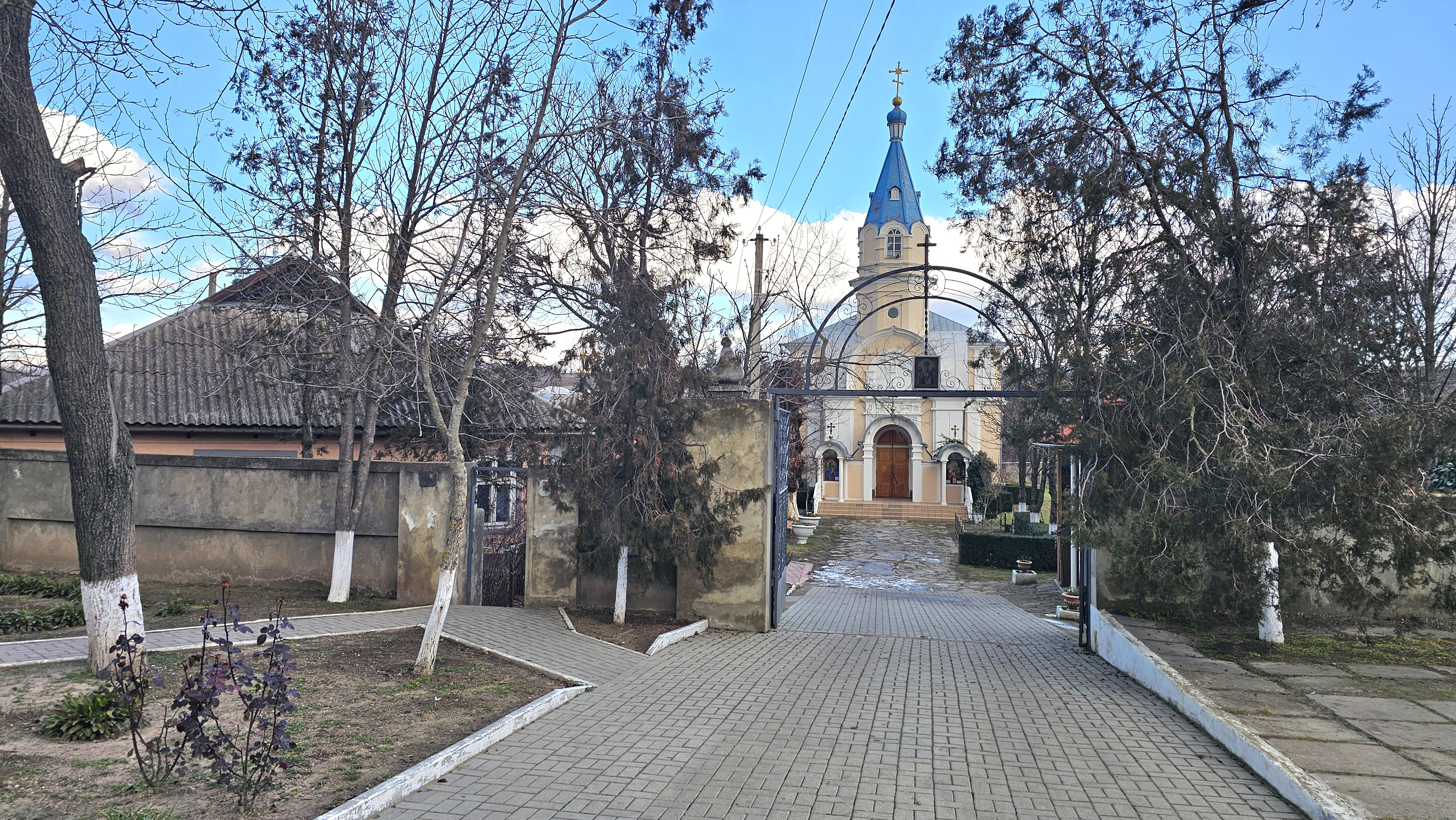
- Valea Perjei "St. Nicholas" Church

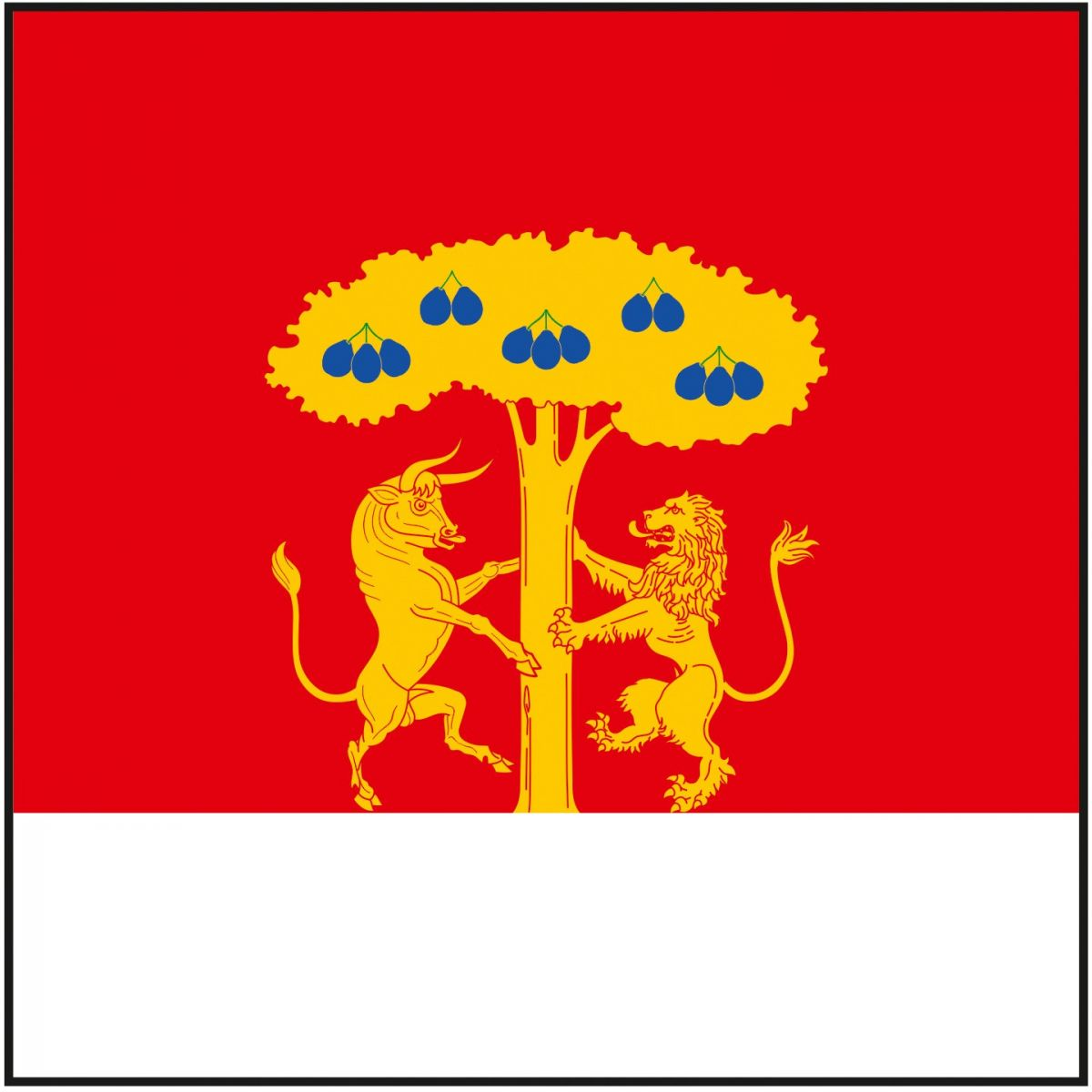
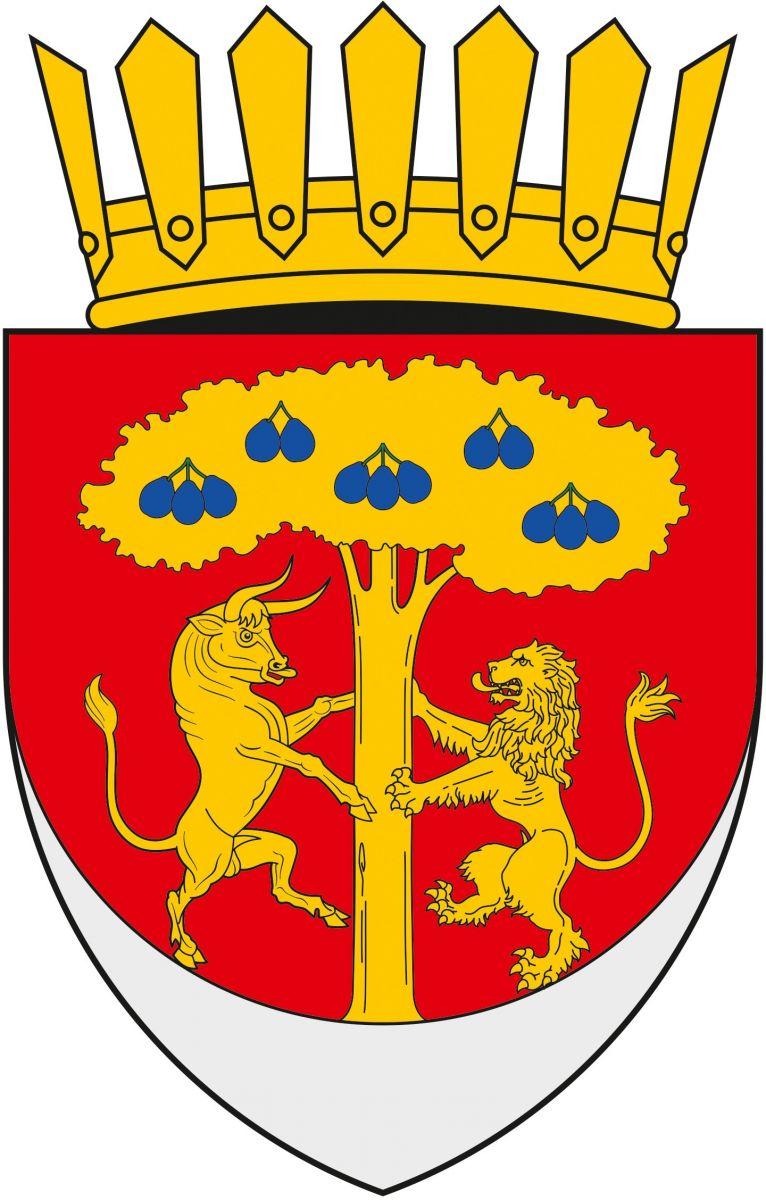
- Flag Coat of arms

- Location of Valea Perjei in Moldova
- Coordinates: 46.0394°N 28.925°E
- Country: Moldova
- District: Taraclia District
- Founded: 1790

Government
  - Mayor: Ivan Nereutsa

Area
  - Total: 8.6 km^{2} (3.3 sq mi)

Population (2024)
  - Total: 2,637
  - Density: 310/km^{2} (790/sq mi)

Ethnicity (2024 census)
  - Bulgarians: 74.6%
  - Moldovans: 18.8%
  - other: 6.6%
- Time zone: UTC+2 (EET)
  - Summer (DST): UTC+3 (EEST)
- Climate: Cfb
- Website: valea-perjei.primarie.md

Valea Perjei (Bulgarian: Валя Пержей) is a village in Taraclia District, Moldova. According to the 2024 Moldovan census the village has 2,637 people, 1,967 (74.6%) of them being Bulgarians, 496 (18.8%) Moldovans and 71 (2.7%) Gagauz.

== History ==
The village of Valea Perjei was founded around 1790. It was settled by Bulgarian refugees from the Ottoman Empire around the Sliven region of Bulgaria. Initially the village had around 400 courtyards of land but by 1817 this had expanded to 7793 hectares. By 1851 the population of the village had risen to 1,310 inhabitants, the vast majority being Bulgarians and Moldovans with smaller communities of Poles, Greeks and Jews, also hosting a school built in 1841. Many of the inhabitants took part in the Russo-Turkish War (1877–1878) as a part of the Bulgarian Volunteer Corps.

Following the World War II, the Soviet famine of 1946–1947 affected the village and around 495 people perished.

In 1953 the four kolhozes in the village were merged into one and was renamed "Krasnoye Znamya" in 1957. At its peak the kolhoz employed around 2,307 people, covering around 6,172 hectares of land.
