= Ukrainians in Moldova =

Total population
- 181,035 (2014 census, 6.6% of total population; excluding Transnistria)

Ukrainians in Moldova represent Moldova's largest ethnic minority. According to the 2014 Moldovan census, 181,035 ethnic Ukrainians lived in Moldova, representing 6.6% of the population of the country. Although Ukrainian settlement of Moldova predates that by Russians, and Ukrainians outnumber them, they have been heavily Russified, especially in urban areas and many speak Russian as their first language.

Furthermore, as a result of the 2022 Russian invasion of Ukraine, an influx of Ukrainian refugees entered the country escaping the war. More precisely, as of 26 July of that year, 549,333 refugees had entered Moldova from Ukraine. Romani refugees from Ukraine claimed that they face discrimination in Moldova.

== History ==
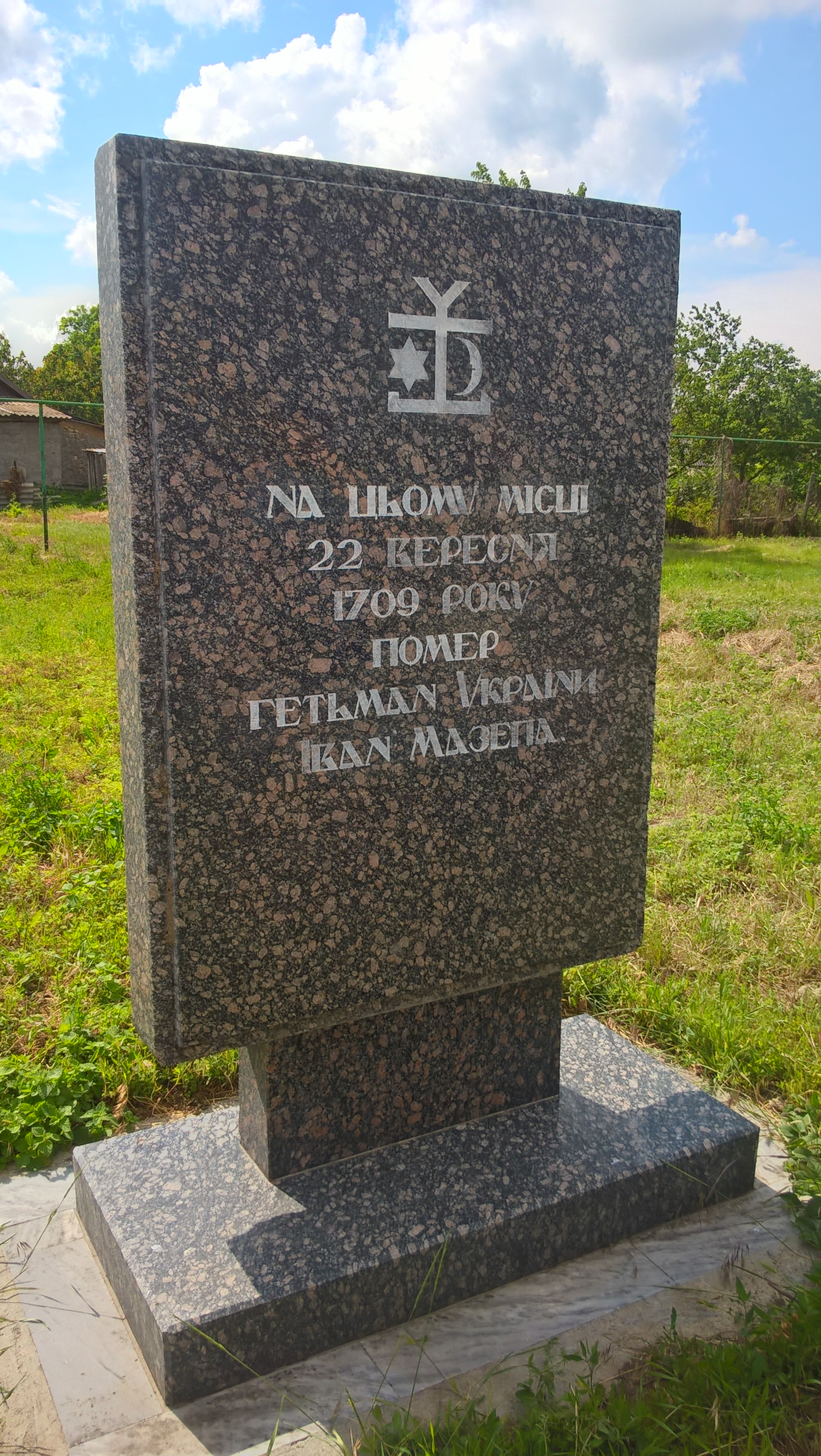
Memorial at the site of Ivan Mazepa's death in Varnița

The historical region of Bessarabia, to which most of the modern territory of Moldova belongs, experienced Slavic settlement starting from the 4th century AD, with tribes of Tivertsi and Uliches residing there in the 9th century. Between the 10th and 14th centuries the area came under the influence of Kyivan Rus and its successor, the Kingdom of Galicia-Volhynia. Bessarabia's incorporation by Moldavia in the 15th century eventually led to the establishment of an Ottoman protectorate over the territory. During the following two centuries, the region became the site of numerous campaigns led by Zaporozhian Cossacks. After the Khmelnytsky Uprising, areas of Rîbnița and Camenca were incorporated into the Cossack Hetmanate, but returned to Poland-Lithuania in 1667, and in 1793 were annexed by the Russian Empire as part of Podolia Governorate. In 1709, Ukrainian hetman Ivan Mazepa and his deputy Pylyp Orlyk stayed in the village of Varnița near Bender (Tighina), where Mazepa soon died.

After the 1812 Treaty of Bucharest, the territory of today's Moldova became part of the Russian Empire. This resulted in mass arrival of settlers from other parts of the empire, including Ukrainians. Following the 1918 Union of Bessarabia with Romania, Ukrainian population of Khotyn and Soroca counties protested against that decision, and sent its representatives to Kyiv, striving to unite their areas with the Ukrainian People's Republic. In 1925 a process against Ukrainian participants of the Tatarbunary Uprising took place in Chișinău. Between 1924 and 1940, a Moldavian Autonomous Soviet Socialist Republic (MASSR) existed on the Left Bank of the Dniester as an administrative part of Ukrainian SSR; starting from 1929, its capital was located in Tiraspol.

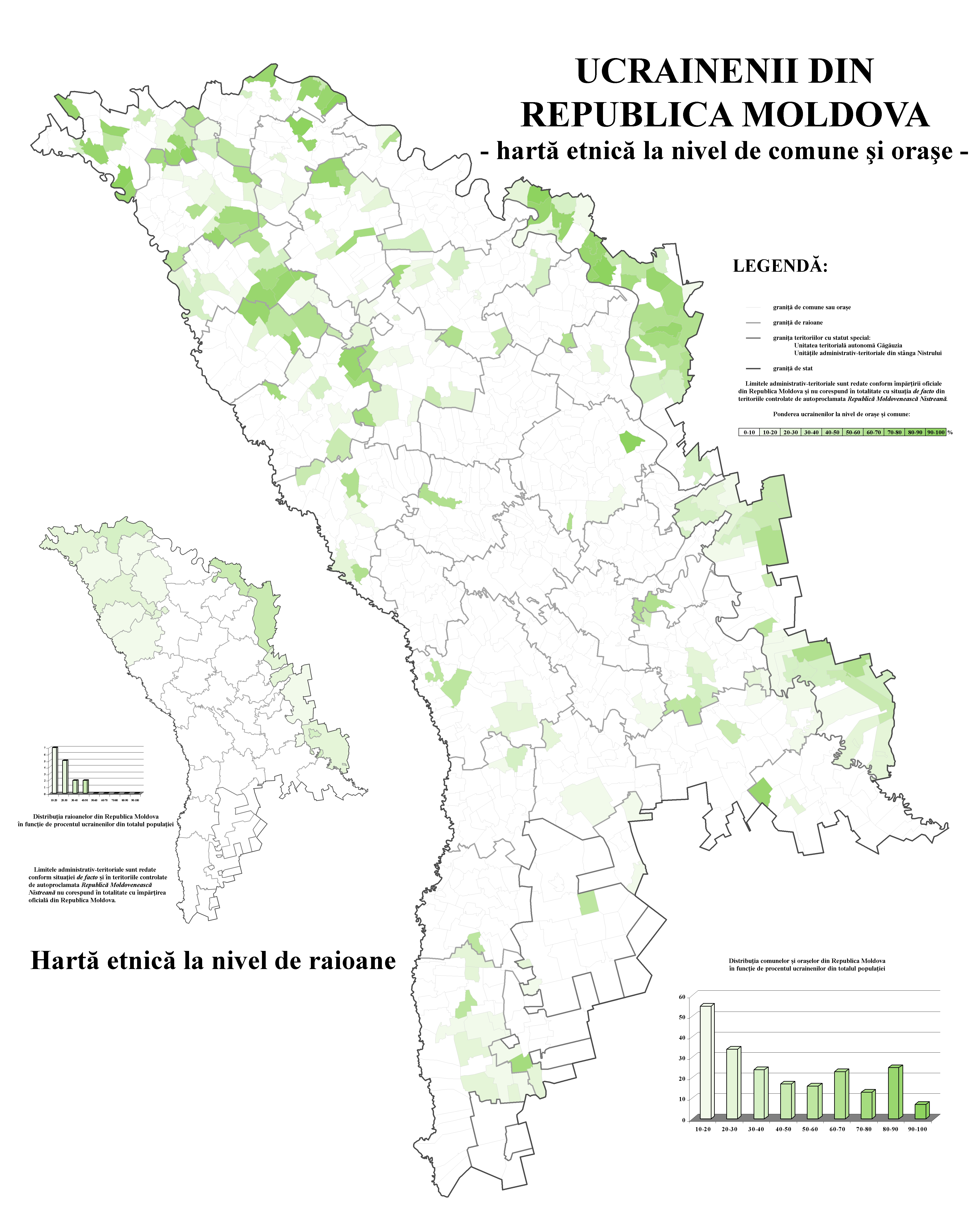
Percentage of ethnic Ukrainians in Moldova by district according to the 2004 Moldovan census

With the Soviet annexation of Bessarabia in 1940, western parts of MASSR, over a quarter of whose population consisted of ethnic Ukrainians, was transferred to Moldavian SSR. After World War II, significant Ukrainian populations existed in the areas of Bălți, Soroca, Orhei and Bender, where the share of ethnic Ukrainians was close to or exceeded 10% of the total number of inhabitants. According to the 1959 Soviet census, 420,000 Ukrainians lived in Moldavian SSR, which equalled to 14.6% of its population; of those 375,000 spoke Ukrainian as first language. The biggest concentrations of Ukrainians were present in the districts of Lipcani, Edineț, Râșcani, Bălți, Fălești, Bender, Căușeni, Rîbnița and Tiraspol. However, as of 1960 no Ukrainian schools, exsited in the republic, and all publications and media were produced either in "Moldovan" (Romanian) or in Russian language.

In the self-proclaimed republic of Transnistria, 160,000 Ukrainians resided as of 2011, which comprised 28.8% of the total population. Most Ukrainians were concentrated in the northern part of the region, where they represented the largest ethnic group. Despite this, only one Ukrainian-language newspaper existed in Transnistria, and broadcasting in Ukrainian was limited to three television programs per week. During the 2006 Ukrainian parliamentary election, Party of Regions had received 55% of votes of Ukrainians residing in Transnistria, and in 2007 that share grew to 70%. A Ukrainian philology department was active at Taras Shevchenko Transnistria State University, and a Ukrainian lyceum was active in Tiraspol. A branch of Interregional Academy of Personnel Management offered 60% of its curriculum in Ukrainian. According to local leader Igor Smirnov, 130,000 inhabitants of Transnistria, or almost a third of the population, had Ukrainian citizenship, although according to official data only 8% of the territory's inhabitants had Ukrainian passports.

Andrii Sybiha, the Minister of Foreign Affairs of Ukraine, announced on 26 June 2026 that Ukraine had included Moldova in its list of countries from which it accepted dual citizenship. This made the Moldovan Ukrainians able to use a simplified procedure to become citizens of Ukraine.

== Notable people ==
- Oleksandr Matsievskyi, Moldovan-born Ukrainian Ground Forces soldier executed by Russian soldiers during the Battle of Bakhmut
- Anatoliy Kinakh, Moldovan-born Ukrainian politician
- Natalia Gordienko, Moldovan singer
- Serhiy Tihipko, Moldovan-born Ukrainian politician
- Ivan Vakarchuk, Ukrainian physicist
- Yevgeny Shevchuk, former president of self-proclaimed Transnistria

== See also ==
- Moldovans and Romanians in Ukraine
- Moldova–Ukraine relations
