= 2024 Moldovan census =

2024 census held in Moldova

- 8 April–7 July 2024

General information
- Country: Moldova

The 2024 Moldovan census was a census in Moldova that was held from 8 April to 7 July 2024. Transnistria, a breakaway state internationally recognized as part of Moldova, refused to guarantee access and offer security guarantees to the Moldovan authorities to hold the census in Corjova and other localities in Dubăsari District.

== Results ==
According to the preliminary results of the 2024 census, out of 2.40 million people, 46.4% (1.11 million people) lived in urban areas and 53.6% (1.28 million people) lived in rural areas. The female population continued to be predominant in 2024, constituting 1.26 million people or 52.9% of the total population (compared to 52.0% in the 2014 census), while the male population constituted 1.13 million people or 47.1% of the country's population (compared to 48.0% in 2014).

At the 2024 census, 99.1% of the total population declared that they had Moldovan citizenship, of which 15.6% people declared that they also held the citizenship of other states, compared to the 2014 census in which 99.5% of the population declared that they held Moldovan citizenship, including 5.6% that also held that of other states. Of the total population that declared its first ethnicity in the 2024 census, people who declared themselves Moldovan and Romanian by first ancestry constituted 76.7% and 8%, respectively. Among the ethnic minorities, 5.1% declared themselves Ukrainian, 4.0% Gagauz, 3.4% Russian, 1.6% Bulgarian, 0.4% Roma/Gypsy and 0.5% other ethnicities. Moreover, 5.7% of the total population declared Romanian as their second ethnicity, 1.4% declared Moldovan, 0.4%, Russian, 0.2% Ukrainian and 0.1% Bulgarian. Those who declared their first ethnicity as Moldovan and Romanian as their second ethnicity formed 5.7% of the total population, while 0.9% declared Romanian as their first ethnicity and Moldovan as their second ethnicity.

Of the total population that declared its mother tongue (limba maternă; distinct from the usually spoken language) in the census, 49.2% declared "Moldovan" and 31.3% declared Romanian, with both adding up to 80.5%. The share of the population that declared Romanian as its mother tongue increased by 8.1% compared to the 2014 census (23.2%), and the share that declared "Moldovan" decreased by 7.8% (56.9% in the 2014 census). Among other languages declared as mother tongues, Russian stood out with 11.1% of the population, followed by Gagauz with 3.8%, Ukrainian with 2.9%, Bulgarian with 1.2%, Romani/Gypsy with 0.3% and other languages with 0.2%. The proportion of the population who declared its mother tongue to be Romanian was higher among younger age groups, and it actually predominated in the 20-29 age group (88.785 who declared their "language to be Romanian, and 88,737 who declared it to be Moldovan.

In contrast, regarding the usually spoken language (limbă vorbită de obicei; distinct from the mother tongue), 46.0% declared it to be "Moldovan" and 33.2% declared it to be Romanian, with both adding up to 79.2%. The two had together an increase of 0.5% compared to the 2014 census, and there was a significant increase in the share of self-declared speakers of Romanian as their usually spoken language, of 9.5%, as well as a decrease in the share of the self-declared speakers of "Moldovan" as their usually spoken language, of 9%, compared to the 2014 census. In the 2024 census, the percentage of speakers of Russian as their usually spoken language was 15.3%, a 0.7% increase since 2014, with other minority languages' share being lower: 2.3% for Gagauz, 2% for Ukrainian, 0.8% for Bulgarian, 0.3% for Romani and 0.2% for other languages. Compared to 2014, there was a decrease in the share of Ukrainian, Gagauz and Bulgarian of 0.8%, 0.3% and 0.2%, respectively. The proportion of the population who declared its usually spoken language to be Romanian was higher among younger age groups for which data is available, and it actually predominated in the 3-29 age group (319,303 who declared their "language to be Romanian, and 289,517 who declared it to be Moldovan).

Of the total urban population that declared its ethnicity in 2024, people who declared themselves Moldovan and Romanian constituted 70.5% and 9.7% respectively. Among the ethnic minorities, 6.1% declared themselves Ukrainian, 5.9% Russian, 4.1% Gagauz, 2.1% Bulgarian, 0.6% Roma/Gypsy and 1% other ethnicities. In Chișinău, the proportion was 72.9% Moldovans, 13.1% Romanians, 5.9% Russians, 5.1% Ukrainians, 0.8% Gagauz, 0.9% Bulgarians, 0.1% Roma/Gypsies and 1.2% other ethnicities. In the country's urban areas, the proportion for the mother tongue was 34.2% for "Moldovan" and 37.3% for Romanian (adding up to 71.5%), 20.0% for Russian, 3.4% for Gagauz, 2.6% for Ukrainian, 1.5% for Bulgarian, 0.5% for Romani/Gypsy and 0.4% for other languages. In the capital Chișinău, the proportion was 28.8% for "Moldovan" and 47.9% for Romanian (adding up to 76.7%), 19.5% for Russian, 2.2% for Ukrainian, 0.4% for Gagauz, 0.4% for Bulgarian, 0.1% for Romani/Gypsy and 0.6% for other languages. Regarding the usually spoken language, the proportion in the urban areas was 31.2% for "Moldovan" and 38.1% for Romanian (adding up to 69.3%), 26.9% for Russian, 1.1% for Ukrainian, 0.9% for Gagauz and Bulgarian, 0.4% for Romani/Gypsy and 0.3% for other languages. In Chișinău, the proportion was 26.1% for "Moldovan" and 49.1% for Romanian (adding up to 75.2%), 23.2% for Russian, 0.9% for Ukrainian, 0.1% for Gagauz and Bulgarian, 0% for Romani/Gypsy and 0.4% for other languages.

Most people declared themselves Eastern Orthodox by religion (95.0%). Among the most representated confessional minorities were the following: Baptists (1.1%), Jehovah's Witnesses (0.7%), Pentecostals (0.5%) and Adventists (0.3%). The following were declared as well: 0.6% atheists and 0.8% with no religion.

== See also ==
- List of cities and towns in Moldova#By population
