= List of villages in Sliven Province =

This is a list of villages in Sliven Province, Bulgaria.

== Kotel Municipality ==
- Borintsi
- Bratan
- Gradets
- Dubova
- Zheravna
- Katunishte
- Kipilovo
- Malko Selo
- Medvev
- Mokren
- Neykovo
- Oplovo
- Ostra Moguila
- Pudarevo
- Sedlarevo
- Sokolartsi
- Strelsti
- Ticha
- Topuzevo
- Filaretovo
- Yablanovo

== Nova Zagora Municipality ==
- Asenovets
- Banya
- Bogdanovo
- Bryastovo
- Byal Kladenets
- Diadovo
- Ezero
- Elenovo
- Zagortsi
- Kamenovo
- Karanovo
- Konovo
- Korten
- Kriva Krusha
- Lyubenets
- Lyubenova Mahala
- Mlekarevo
- Nauchene
- Novoselets
- Omarchevo
- Pet Mogili
- Pitovo
- Polsko Pudarevo
- Prohorovo
- Radevo
- Radetski
- Sokol
- Stoil Voyvoda
- Subrano
- Sadievo
- Sadiysko Pole
- Tsenino

== Sliven Municipality ==
- Bikovo
- Binkos
- Blatets
- Bozhevtsi
- Bozadzhii
- Byala
- Vaglen
- Gavrailovo
- Gergevets
- Glufishevo
- Glushnik
- Golyamo Chochoveni
- Gorno Aleksandrovo
- Gradsko
- Dragodanovo
- Zhelyu Voyvoda
- Zaychari
- Zlati Voyvoda
- Izgrev
- Ichera
- Kaloyanovo
- Kamen
- Kovachite
- Krushare
- Malko Chochoveni
- Mechkarevo
- Mladovo
- Nikolaevo
- Novachevo
- Panaretovtsi
- Rakovo
- Samuilovo
- Seliminovo
- Skobelevo
- Sotiria
- Sredorek
- Stara Reka
- Staro Selo
- Strupets
- Topolchane
- Trapoklovo
- Chintulovo
- Chokoba

== Tvarditsa Municipality ==
- Bliznets
- Borov Dol
- Byala Palanka
- Zhalt Bryag
- Orizari
- Sborishte
- Sartsevo
- Chervenakovo
- Shivachevo

== See also ==
- List of villages in Bulgaria
