= Katunishte =

Katunishte Катунище
- Village
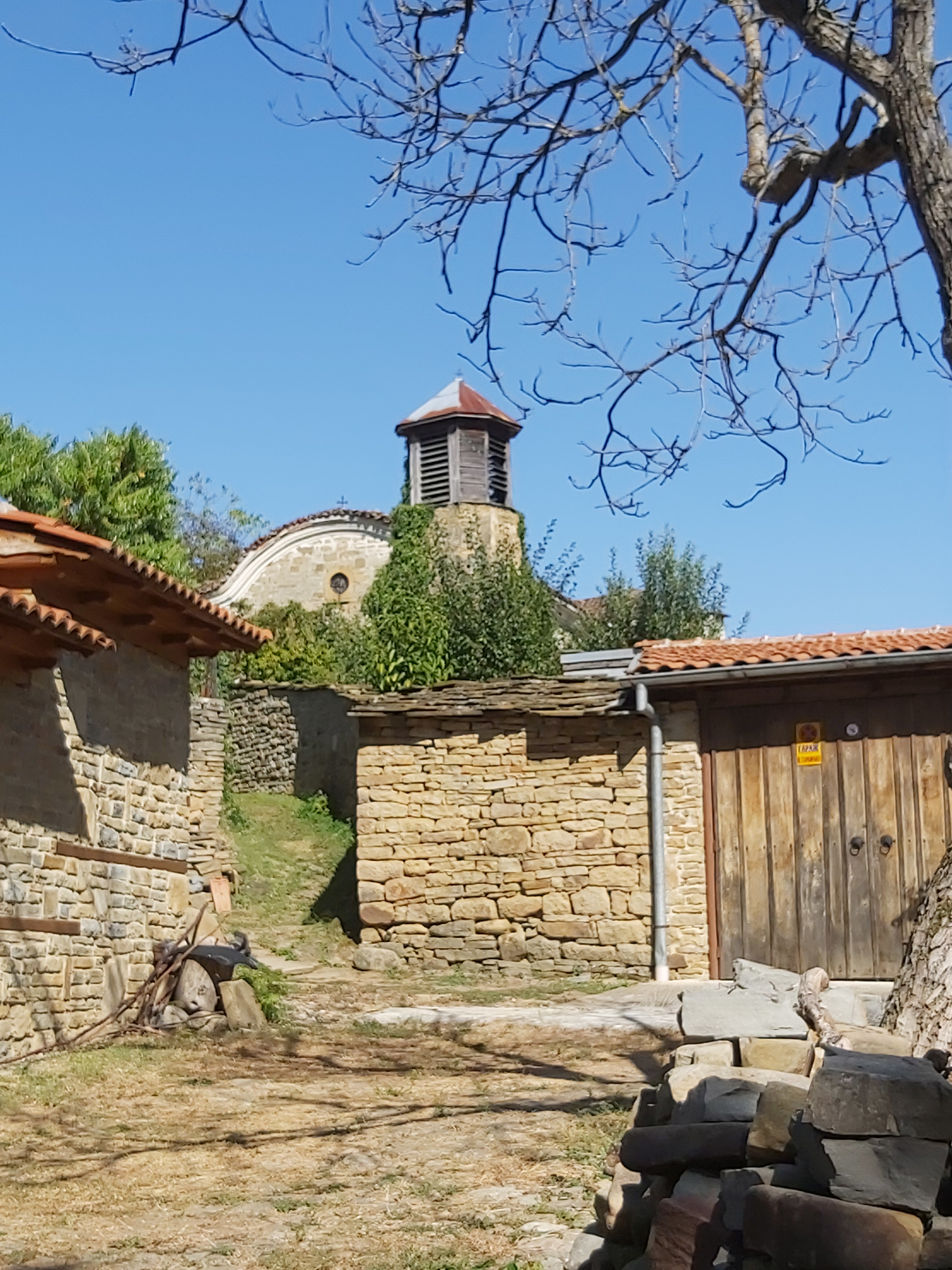

- Location in Bulgaria
- Coordinates: 42.8067°N 26.5059°E
- Country: Bulgaria
- Province: Sliven Province
- Municipality: Kotel
- Elevation: 457 m (1,499 ft)

Population (2013)
  - Total: 28
- Time zone: UTC+2 (EET)
  - Summer (DST): UTC+3 (EEST)

Katunishte Village (Bulgarian: Катунище) is a village in Sliven Province, Bulgaria. Katunishte features a community center and offers modern amenities such as cable TV, internet access, and mobile phone coverage. The village is home to several eco-friendly houses that operate as hotels, along with a restaurant, café, and local shops. Katunishte Village is recognized as a national architectural reserve, with all its houses showcasing Renaissance style architecture.

== Landmarks and Locations ==
The St. Trinity church, constructed in the 19th century can be found nearby. Surrounding the village are additional attractions areas such as Lisichi Dol, Valkov Chair, and Sredoryaka. Nearby, in Gradets the remnants of the ancient Roman Kale can be located, being positioned to oversee all routes to the site. The Kamchia River flows below, providing spots for fishing. The architectural reserves of Zheravna, located 8 km northwest, and Medven, 10 km northeast, are part of the network of tourist sites recognized by the Bulgarian Tourist Union.
