= II-48 road (Bulgaria) =

Road in Bulgaria

Republic Road I-48
- Републикански път I-48

Route information
- Length: 62.7 km (39.0 mi)

Major junctions
- From: Km 208.6 of I-4
- To: Km 221.2 of I-7

Location
- Country: Bulgaria

Highway system
- Highways in Bulgaria

Republican Road II-48 (Bulgarian: Републикански път II-48) is a second-class road in eastern Bulgaria, running through Targovishte and Sliven Provinces. Its length is 62.7 km.

== Route description ==
The road starts at Km 208.6 of the first class I-4 road north of the town of Omurtag. It bypasses the town from the east and the south, heads south through the Lisa mountain and in 13.4 km enters Sliven Province. The road the descends to the valley of the river Golyama Kamchiya at the village of Ticha and then ascends the Kotlen Mountain of the Balkan Mountains through the Kotlen Pass (659 m). The road descends to the town of Kotel in 4.5 km and continues southeast through the valley of the Kotlenska reka until reaching the river Luda Kamchiya at the village of Gradets. From there it ascends the northern slope of the Stidovska Mountain and at the highest point of the Mokren Pass (450 m) reaches its terminus at Km 221.2 of the first class I-7 road.
