= Romani people in Bulgaria =

Ethnic group

Ромите в България Roma andi Bulgariya

Total population
- 325,343 (2011 Census; 4.4%) European Commission's average estimate: 750,000 (last updated 14 September 2010) unofficial estimates: 800,000

Regions with significant populations
- Nationwide, rural and urban. Centered in cities with the largest concentrations in Sliven, Sofia, and Pazardzhik.

Languages
- Balkan Romani (84%); Bulgarian (7%); Turkish (7%) (by mother tongue; 2011 census)

Religion
- 2021 census in Bulgaria on those identified as Romani: Unaffiliated (29.5%); Eastern Orthodox Christianity (28.4%); Islam (17.2%); Protestant (12.1%)

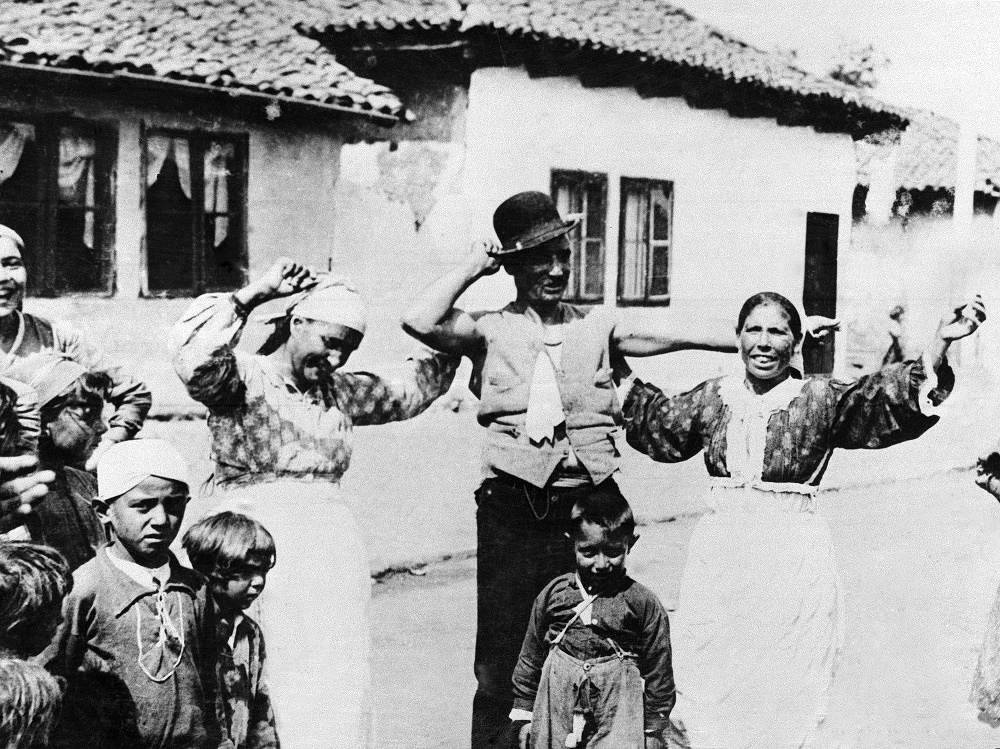
Romani wedding in Sofia, 1936

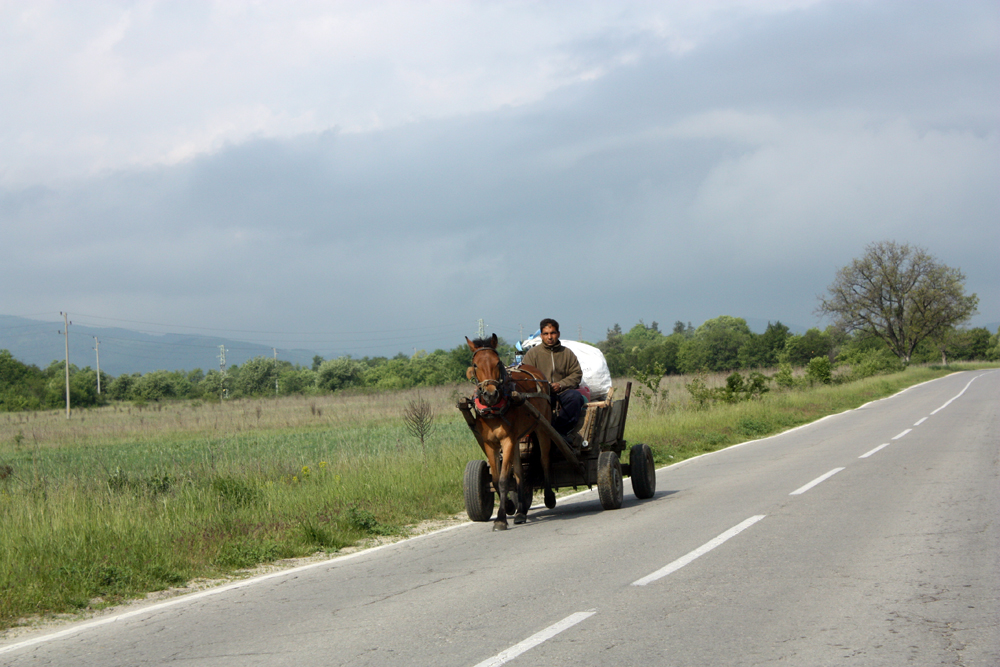
A Romani in wagon (Dolna Banya)

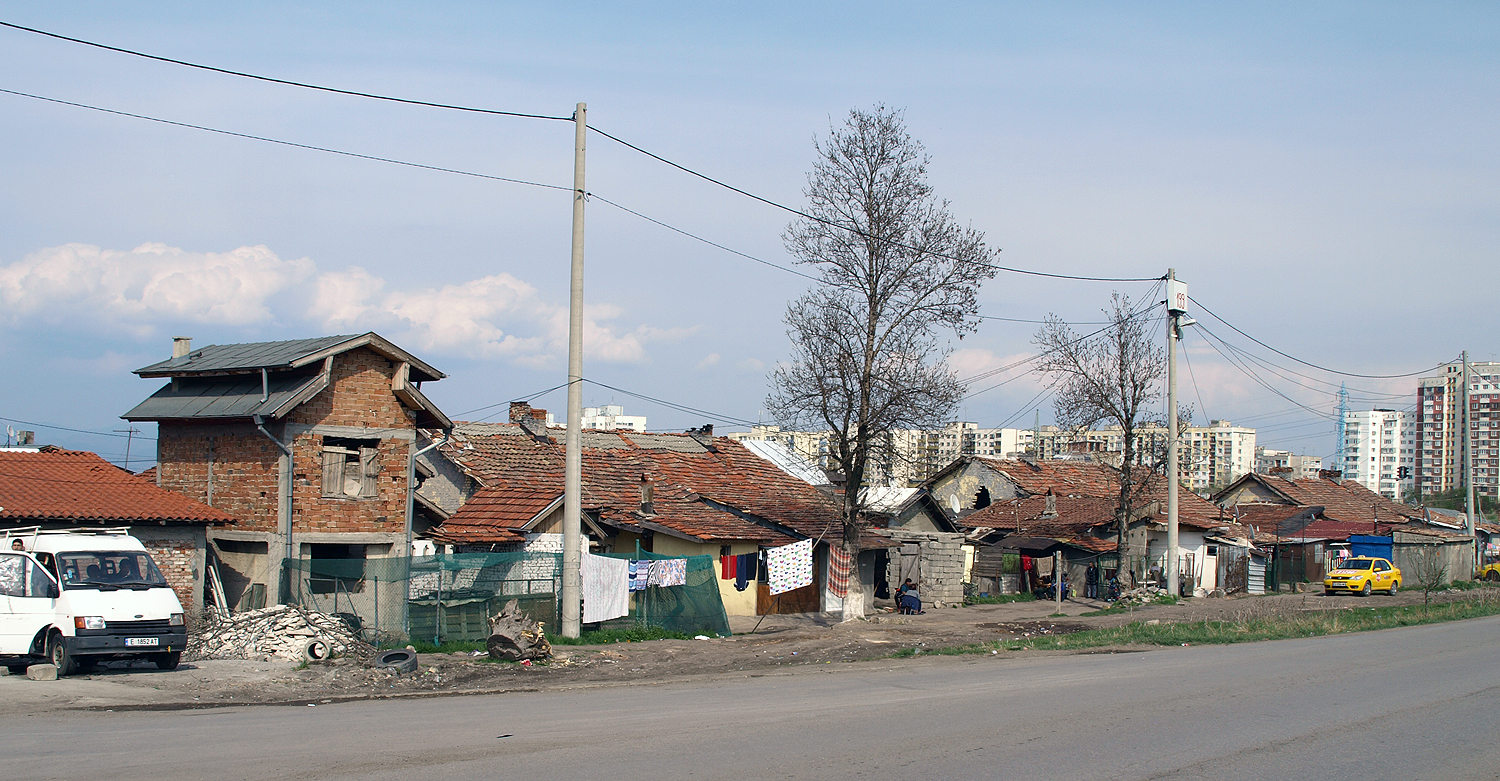
Romani ghetto in Filipovtsi, Sofia

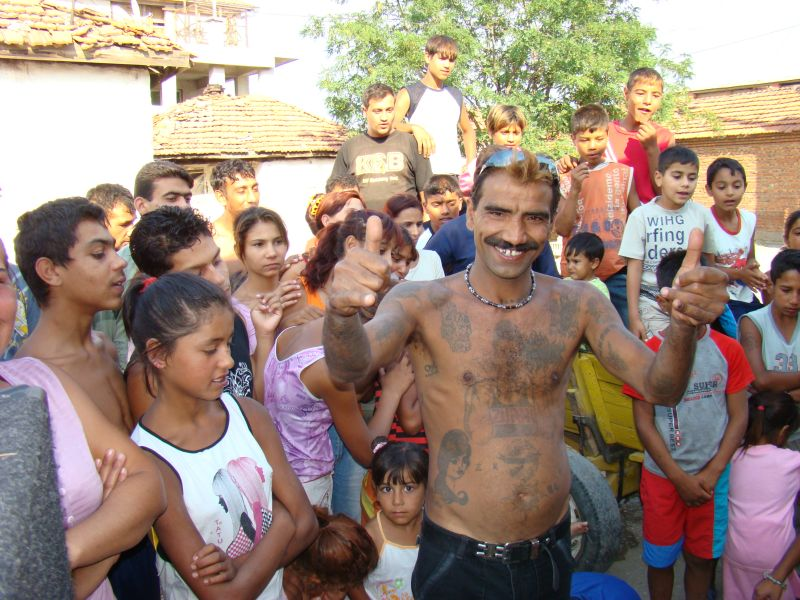
Roma people in Sliven

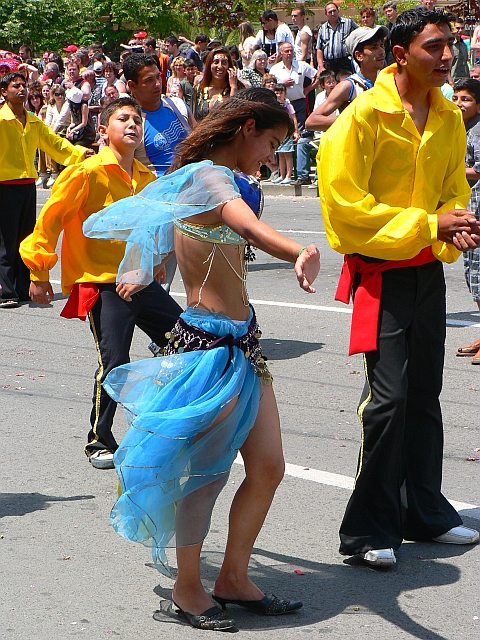
Roma dancers

Romani people in Bulgaria (Bulgarian: Ромите в България, romanized: Romite v Bǎlgariya; Romani: Romane ando Bulgariya) constitute Europe's densest Romani minority. The Romani people in Bulgaria may speak Bulgarian, Turkish or Romani, depending on the region.

== Statistics ==
According to the latest census in 2011, the number of the Romani is 325,343, constituting 4.4% of the total population, in which only one ethnic group could be opted as an answer and 10% of the total population did not respond to the question on ethnic group. In a conclusive report of the census sent to Eurostat, the authors of the census (the National Statistical Institute of Bulgaria) identified the census results on ethnicity as a "gross manipulation". The former head of the National Statistical Institute of Bulgaria, Reneta Indzhova claims to have been fired by the Bulgarian Prime Minister in 2014 for attempting to check the actual number of the Romani and implied that neither the census did enumerate the Romani, nor its statistics did provide the "real data".

The previous 2001 census recorded 370,908 Romani (4.7% of the population). The preceding 1992 census recorded 313,396 Romani (3.7% of the population), while a secret backstage 1992 census ordered by the Ministry of Interior recorded a figure of 550,000 Romani (6.5% of the population); the Ministry of Interior ordered at least two other secret censuses to enumerate the Romani in denial, the one in 1980 recorded 523,519 Romani, while the one in 1989 recorded that the number of the Romani was 576,927 (6.5% of the population) and that over half of the Romani identified as Turks. The majority of the estimated 200,000-400,000 Muslim Romani tend to identify themselves as ethnic Turks, some deny their origin, or identify as Bulgarians.

The demographic collapse in Bulgaria that has affected most ethnic groups in the country has not had the same effect on the Romani. According to data of the European Commission, to which Eurostat belongs, the Romani in Bulgaria number 750,000 and they constitute 10.33% of the population. An NGO disputes this claim and estimates that the number of the Romani in Bulgaria is twice as high, stating their population grows by 35,000 a year.

== Overview ==
In Bulgaria, Romani are most commonly referred as Tsigani (цигани, pronounced [tsiɡəni]), an exonym that some Romani resent as derogatory and others embrace. The form of the endonym Roma in Bulgarian is romi (роми). They are generally younger, according to the 2011 census they make up 10.2% of the population aged up to 9 years, on a note 14.9% of the total age group being non-respondents.

In Bulgaria Roma are disliked: 59% to 80% of non-Roma have negative feelings towards Roma. Roma constitute the majority of prison population according to self-identification of inmates, with 7000 prisoners (70%) out of 10,000 in total. According to 2002 data, the poverty rate among Romani is 61.8%, in contrast to a rate of 5.6% among Bulgarians. In 1997, 84% of Bulgarian Romani lived under the poverty line, compared with 32% of ethnic Bulgarians. In 1994, the poverty rate of Romani was estimated at 71.4%, compared with 15% for Bulgarians. The unemployment rate of non-Romani in Bulgaria was 25%, while of the Romani it was 65% in 2008, for instance in neighbouring Romania and Hungary the Romani had much lower unemployment rates—14% and 21% respectively. In 2016 23% of the Romani in Bulgaria are employed. The unemployed receive more financial aid than other citizens, especially for children, which may have prompted the higher birth rates of the Romani.

In 2011 the share of Romani with university degree reached 0.3%, while 6.9% have secondary education; the same share was 22.8%/47.6% for Bulgarians.

The Bulgarians are more negative towards the Romani than the Turks, with 30-50% rejecting various interactions and friendship with Romani. Although only 25% of Romani parents object to their children to be married with a Bulgarian and a Turk, only 4% of the Bulgarians and 6% of the Turks would marry a Romani person. Romani are avoided by the majority traditionally, especially for marriage, however, there are ethnically mixed people with Gypsy and Bulgarian or Turk parents who are called жоревци "zhorevtsi" (from the common name George). It is more common for a Roma Man to marry a Bulgarian or Turk woman, than for a Roma woman to marry a non-Romani Man.

Bulgaria participates in the Decade of Roma Inclusion, an international initiative to improve the socio-economic status and social inclusion of Roma, with eight other governments committing themselves to "work toward eliminating discrimination and closing the unacceptable gaps between Roma and the rest of society". The rights of the Romani people in the country are also represented by political parties and cultural organizations, most notably the Civil Union "Roma". Famous Roma from Bulgaria include musicians Azis, Sofi Marinova and Ivo Papazov, surgeon Aleksandar Chirkov, politicians Toma Tomov and Tsvetelin Kanchev, footballer Marian Ognyanov, and 1988 Olympic boxing champion Ismail Mustafov.

The occupations of Bulgarian Roma include fortune-telling, music, horse dealing, bear keeping, entertainment, animal training, acrobatics, blacksmithing, coppersmithing, tinsmithing, woodworking, sieve making, comb making, basket weaving, shoemaking, and seasonal agricultural work. Many of these professions persist in Bulgaria today, alongside middleman peddling, black market trading, and the nearly universal presence of wage labor. Within the realm of wage labor, the Roma in Bulgaria find themselves in a low-status economic position: unskilled factory jobs are prevalent, as well as agricultural work on cooperative farms, street cleaning, and railroad maintenance.

== History ==
=== Origin ===
The ancestors of the Romani people originated in South Asia, presumably from the present-day regions of Punjab, Rajasthan and Sindh.

Linguistic evidence reveals that the roots of the Romani language lie in what is now India: the language has grammatical characteristics of Indian languages and shares with them a big part of the basic lexicon, for example, body parts or daily routines. More exactly, Romani shares the basic lexicon with Hindi and Punjabi. It shares many phonetic features with Marwari, while its grammar is closest to Bengali.

The language of the Romani people is called Romani [romaňi čhib]. It is an Indo-Aryan language, which belongs to the Indo-Iranian branch of the Indo-European family. The language retains much Indic morphology, phonology and lexicon, although it has been significantly influenced by contact with other languages, particularly Persian, Armenian, Byzantine Greek. Its grammar and phonology also reflect South Slavic influence.

Genetic findings in 2012 suggest the ancestors of the Romanies originated in present-day northwestern India and migrated as a group. According to a genetic study in 2012, the ancestors of present Scheduled Castes and Scheduled Tribes populations of northern India, traditionally referred to collectively as the Ḍoma, are the likely ancestral populations of the modern European Roma.

In February 2016, during the International Roma Conference, the Indian Minister of External Affairs stated that the people of the Roma community were children of India. The conference ended with a recommendation to the Government of India to recognize the Roma community spread across 30 countries as a part of the Indian diaspora.

=== Migration to Bulgaria ===
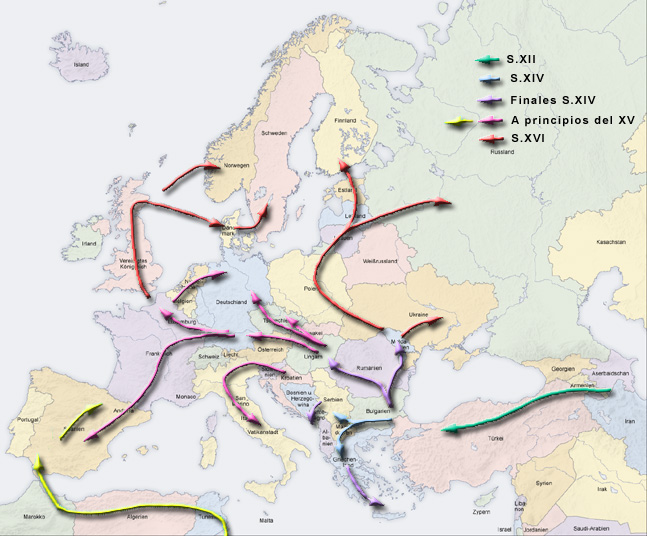
The migration of the Romani people through the Middle East and North Africa to Europe. The key shows the century of arrival in that area, e.g., S.XII is the 12th century

The Romani people emigrated from South Asia possibly as early as the 5th century. They settled in Persia, followed by Armenia, before arriving in the ancient Greek city of Byzantium likely in the 9th century, though possibly as early as the 7th century. The shift in the self-identification of the Romani people from "Doma" to "Roma"/"Romani" is believed to have taken place during the Romanies' arrival and settlement in the Balkans during the Byzantine era. "Roma"/"Romani" is believed to have been influenced by the Medieval Greek word Romaios, meaning Eastern Roman, referring to the inhabitants of the Byzantine Empire—which they called Romanía. It is suspected that given the proximity between Bulgaria and historical Byzantium, it is possible that the Romani people may have been present in the territory of present-day Bulgaria as early as the 7th century.

Bulgarian ethnologists Elena Marushiakova and Veselin Popov assert that no direct evidence indicates when precisely the Romani first appeared in Bulgaria. While they mention that other Bulgarian and international scholars have associated the 1387 Charter of Rila term Agoupovi Kleti with the Romani, they hold that the term refers to seasonal lodgings for mountain herdsmen. Instead, they delimit the mass settlement of Romani in Bulgarian territory between the 13th and 14th centuries, supporting this time frame with 13th- and 14th-century documents referring to Romani presence in the surrounding Balkan states. According to Bulgarian sociologist Ilona Tomova, Ottoman fiscal reports between the 15th and 17th centuries indirectly indicate Romani settlement in Bulgaria since the 13th century, as most registered Romani possessed Slavonic names and were Christians.

"Although the largest Roma migration wave to the Bulgarian lands seems to have occurred in the 13th and 14th centuries, many Roma arrived with the Ottoman troops, accompanying army craftsmen and complementary military units."

In addition, during the 14th and 15th centuries, Muslim Romani arrived in Bulgaria with the Ottoman rule, serving as auxiliaries, craftsmen, musicians and other professions. Unlike the Ottoman Empire's other subjects in the millet system, Romani were governed based on their ethnicity, not their religious affiliation. Ottoman tax records first mention Romani in the Nikopol region, where 3.5% of the registered households were Romani. Under Mehmed II's reign, all Romani – Christian and Muslim – paid a poll-tax that was otherwise imposed only on non-Muslims.

During the 16th century, Suleiman I enacted laws to prohibit the mingling of Muslim and Christian Romani and to administer taxes collected from the Romani: the 1530 Gypsies in the Rumelia Region Act and a 1541 law for the Romani sancak. Muslim Romani were taxed less than Christian Romani, yet they were taxed more than other Muslims for not adhering to Islamic laws and customs. Ottoman imperial assembly registers from 1558 to 1569 characterize the Romani as ehl-i fesad (people of malice), charging them with crimes such as prostitution, murder, theft, vagrancy and counterfeiting.

== Groups ==
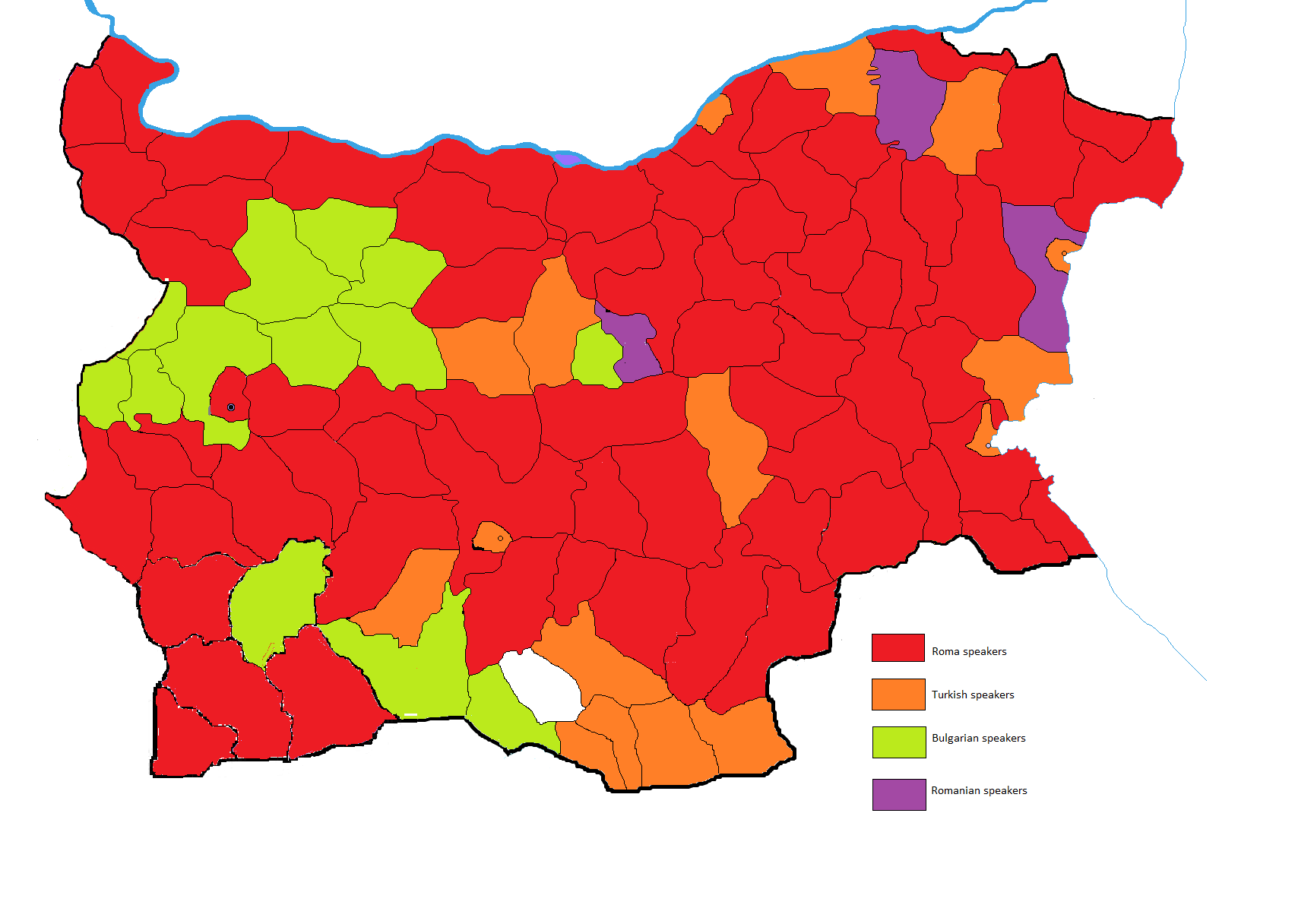
Mother tongue with largest population of the Romani according to the 1946 census

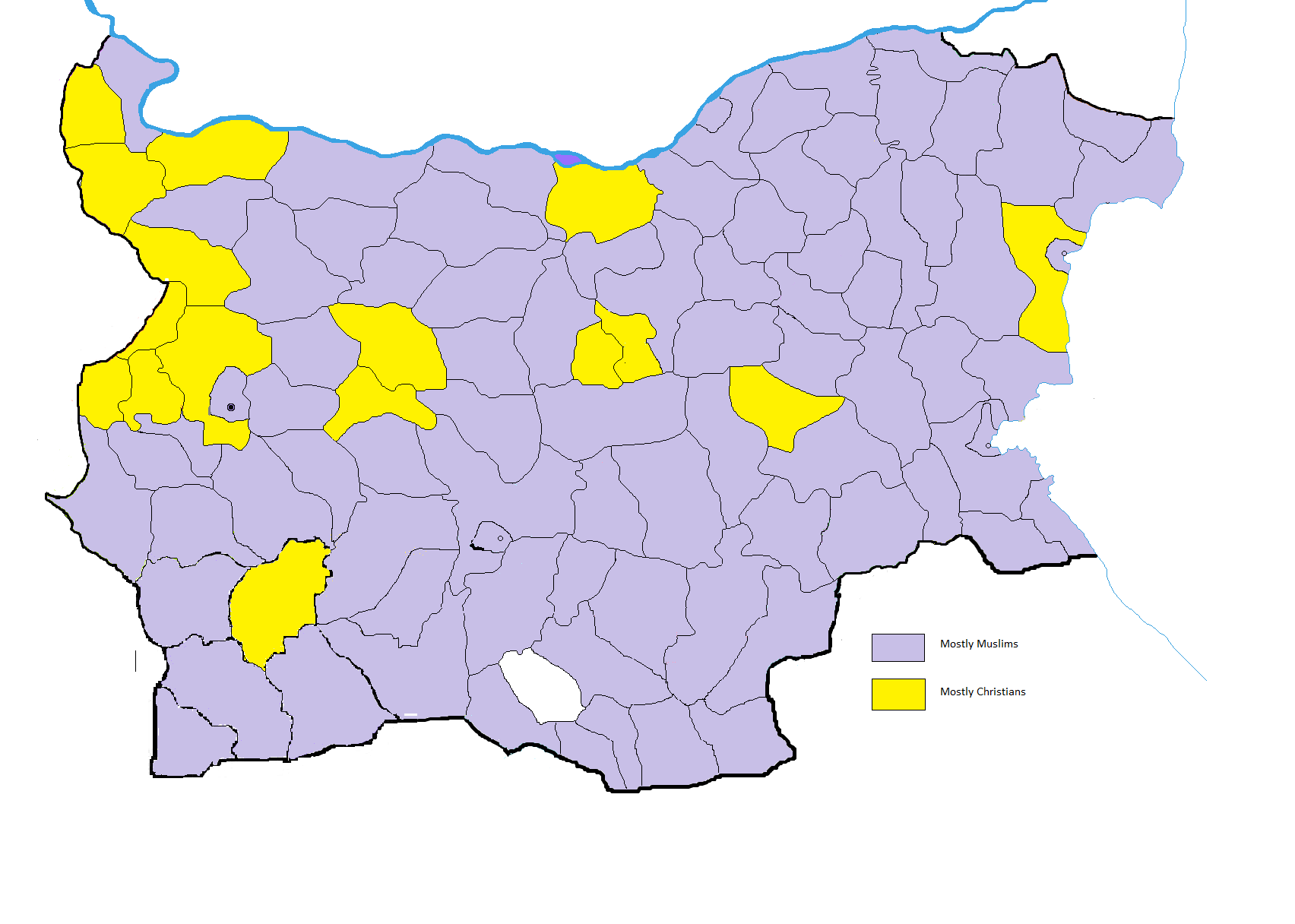
Religion with largest population of the Romani according to the 1946 census before most converted to Christianity

Roma in Bulgaria are not a unified community in culture and lifestyle. The most widespread group of the Romani in the country are the yerli or the 'local Roma', who are in turn divided into Bulgarian Gypsies (Dasikane Roma) and Turkish Gypsies (Horahane Roma). The former are Christian (Eastern Orthodox and some few are believe in Evangelicalism), while the latter are Cultural Muslims. Many of the Muslim Romani or the so-called Turkish Roma (Turkish Gypsies) are usually well integrated in the ethnic Turkish society in Bulgaria. Many possess Turkish ethnic identity and speak Turkish in addition to Romani. According to the latest census in 2021, of Romani 17.2% are Muslims. Muslim Romani can be divided into several linguistic groups: for example the Horahane Roma, who speak only Romani (although they know Turkish or Bulgarian) and identify themselves as Horahane Roma; Horahane Roma whose language is a mix between Balkan Romani and Turkish; Horahane Roma who use only Turkish (rarely Bulgarian and Romani); and Horahane Roma who can only speak Turkish, identifying themselves as Turks.

The Futadžides Romani dialect or Futadžiite, is spoken by the Muslim Romani Futacı (Fouta towel/Peshtemal maker, from Haskovo and Haskovo Municipality but also some of them live in Stara Zagora and Plovdiv and East Thrace in Turkey too. It is a very strong Turkish influenced Romani dialect.

=== Other identities ===
The Millet people — In Ottoman archives from the 18th and 19th centuries, a special sub-group of 4 clans of Turkish-speaking Nomads of Alevism faith, who did not speak Romany was mentioned, namely the Turkmen Kiptileri. In the past, this group had strong contact with Turkmen tribes, it is suspected that they are the same as Abdal of Turkey.

The Asparuhovi bâlgari ("Asparuh Bulgarians"), that is known also as stari bâlgari ("Old Bulgarians"), sivi gâlâbi ("Grey Doves", "Grey Pigeons"), or demirdzhii — self-identify as the descendants of blacksmiths for Khan Asparuh's army. They live mostly in southern Bulgaria. Some deny any connection with the Romani and most do not speak Romani.

== Demographics ==
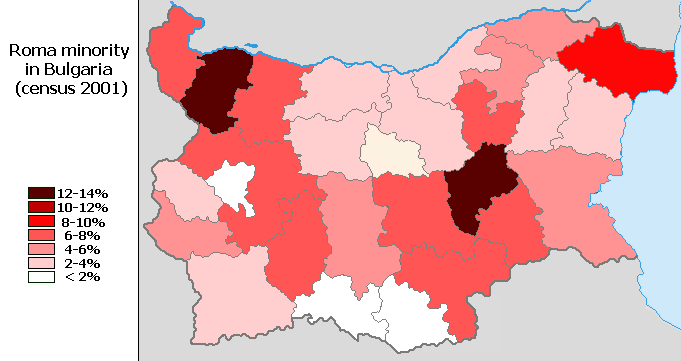
Romani minority in Bulgaria (census 2001)

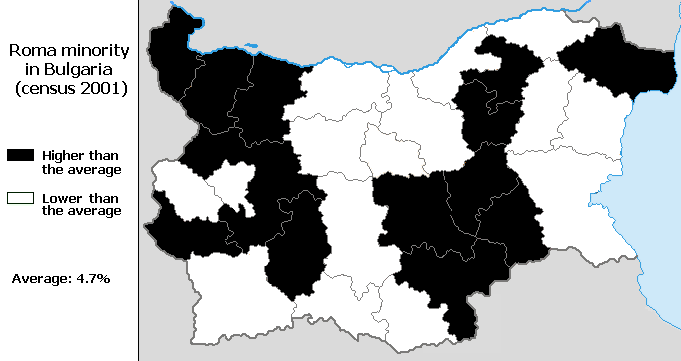
Romani minority in Bulgaria (census 2001)

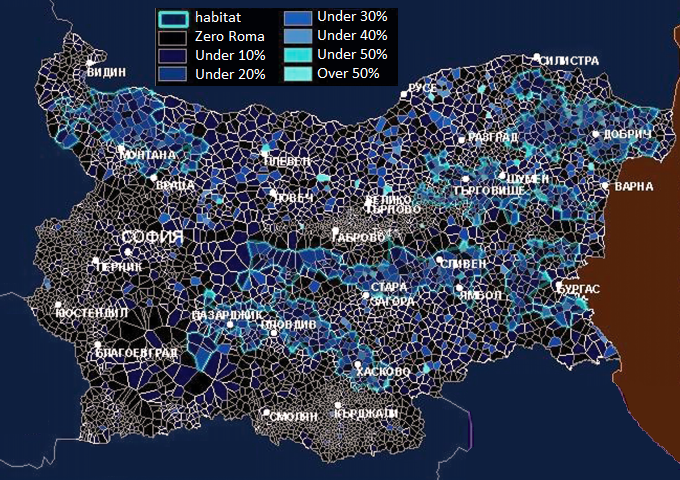
Distribution of the Romani in Bulgaria according to the 2001 census

Distribution of the Roma ethnic groups by municipalities in Bulgaria according to the 2011 census (represented as percentage of the municipality population)

Distribution of ethnic groups according to the 2011 census

According to the 2011 census of the population of Bulgaria, there are 325,343 Romani in Bulgaria, or 4.4 percent. 180,266 of these are urban residents and 145,077 rural.

Most of the Roma, 66%, are young children and adults up to 29 years old, the same group constitutes 37% among ethnic Bulgarians, while 5% of Roma are 60 years and over, Bulgarians are 22%.

From the 1992 census to the 2001 census, the number of Romani in the country has increased by 57,512, or 18.4%. The Romani were only 2.8% in 1910 and 2.0% in 1920.

While the Romani are present in all provinces of Bulgaria, their highest percentages are in Montana Province (12.5%) and Sliven Province (12.3%) and their smallest percentage is in Smolyan Province, where they number 686 — about 0.05% of the population.

Varbitsa is possibly the only urban settlement where the Romani are the most numerous group. The largest Romani quarters are Stolipinovo in Plovdiv and Fakulteta in Sofia. The number of places where Romani constitute more than 50% of the population has doubled from the 1992 to the 2001 census. The largest village with a Romani majority is Gradets in Kotel Municipality.

Province	Roma population (census 2011)	%
Blagoevgrad Province	9,739	3.43%
Burgas Province	18,424	4.97%
Dobrich Province	15,323	8.81%
Gabrovo Province	1,305	1.13%
Haskovo Province	15,889	6.99%
Kardzhali Province	1,296	0.99%
Kyustendil Province	8,305	6.36%
Lovech Province	5,705	4.38%
Montana Province	18,228	12.71%
Pazardzhik Province	20,350	8.27%
Pernik Province	3,560	2.84%
Pleven Province	9,961	4.15%
Plovdiv Province	30,202	4.87%
Razgrad Province	5,719	5.00%
Ruse Province	8,615	3.98%
Shumen Province	13,847	8.24%
Silistra Province	5,697	5.11%
Sliven Province	20,478	11.82%
Smolyan Province	448	0.47%
Sofia City Province	18,284	1.55%
Sofia Province	17,079	7.40%
Stara Zagora Province	24,018	7.80%
Targovishte Province	7,767	7.27%
Varna Province	13,432	3.16%
Veliko Tarnovo Province	3,875	1.66%
Vidin Province	7,282	7.66%
Vratsa Province	10,082	6.18%
Yambol Province	10,433	8.48%
Total	325,343	4.87%

estimates
Province	Ministry of Interior 1989		RSC 2021		PROUD ROMA 2021	
Province	Number	%	Number	%	Number	%
Blagoevgrad Province	16,100	4.6%	18,900	6.78%	19,950	7.16%
Burgas Province	37,894	8.4%			30,000	8.32%
Dobrich Province	23,665	9.2%	5,000	6.30%	7,000	8.83%
Gabrovo Province	5,920	3.4%			5,000	5.04%
Haskovo Province	13,488	4.5%			20,000	9.96%
Kardzhali Province	9,843	3.3%			12,000	9.25%
Kyustendil Province	8,463	4.4%	14,000	12.75%	15,000	13.66%
Lovech Province	17,746	8.8%			7,000	5.97%
Montana Province	28,813	12.9%	5,700	5.08%	30,000	26.71%
Pazardzhik Province	45,705	14.0%	22,244	10.34%	49,000	22.77%
Pernik Province	38	0.0%			5,000	4.42%
Pleven Province	24,870	6.9%	3,506	1.65%	35,000	16.45%
Plovdiv Province	45,333	6.0%	18,900	3.02%	87,000	13.89%
Razgrad Province	15,213	7.7%	5,400	5.59%	12,000	12.43%
Ruse Province	16,306	5.4%			11,000	6.06%
Shumen Province	20,128	7.9%	9,500	6.58%	18,000	12.46%
Silistra Province	12,826	7.4%			10,000	10.92%
Sliven Province	46,491	19.4%	42,900	27.31%	44,000	28.01%
Smolyan Province	548	0.3%			3,000	3.14%
Sofia City Province	38,000	3.2%	64,081	3.76%	79,000	4.64%
Sofia Province	14,136	4.6%	64,081	3.76%	79,000	4.64%
Stara Zagora Province	28,289	6.9%			40,000	13.98%
Targovishte Province	17,035	10.0%			10,000	10.67%
Varna Province	20,682	4.5%	7,000	1.64%	20,000	4.68%
Veliko Tarnovo Province	20,880	6.2%			20,000	10.03%
Vidin Province	15,115	9.1%			20,000	26.85%
Vratsa Province	22,160	7.7%	12,000	8.01%	23,000	15.36%
Yambol Province	11,240	5.5%			15,000	14.47%
Total	576,927	6.4%	229,131	3.51%	646,950	9.92%

=== Age structure ===
Although Roma constitute only 4.4 percent of the Bulgarian population, they constitute around 12 percent of all children aged between 0 and 9 years old according to the 2011 census. In some municipalities, like Valchedram and Ruzhintsi in northwestern Bulgaria, more than the half of all children belong to the Roma ethnicity.

Roma population by age group and share of total Bulgarian population as of 2011
Ethnic group	Total	0 – 9	10 – 19	20 – 29	30 – 39	40 – 49	50 – 59	60 – 69	70 – 79	80+
Roma	325,343	67,568	59,511	59,442	49,572	37,723	28,411	15,833	6,031	1,252
Percentage of Bulgarian population	4.9	12.0	9.7	6.8	5.1	4.1	3.0	1.8	1.0	0.4

Historical population
Year	Pop.	±%
1900	89,549	—
1905	99,004	+10.6%
1910	122,296	+23.5%
1920	98,451	−19.5%
1926	134,844	+37.0%
1934	149,385	+10.8%
1946	170,011	+13.8%
1956	197,865	+16.4%
1965	148,928	−24.7%
1975	18,323	−87.7%
1992	313,396	+1610.4%
2001	370,908	+18.4%
2011	325,343	−12.3%
2021	266,720	−18.0%

== Culture ==
Chalga is influenced by Romani music. Bulgarian Roma often use the zurna instrument. Bulgarian wedding music is often performed by Bulgarian Roma.

Foods that Bulgarian Roma typically eat are cabbage rolls, vine rolls, New Year's rooster, meat casserole, grtsmuli, baklava, baked pumpkin, gypsy banitsa, resenitsa, cabbage soup with leeks, and red wine served with roasted hot peppers.

Romani folklore in Bulgaria significantly integrates local mythical beings, including samodivi (forest fairies), zmeyove (dragons), and talasami (goblins or household spirits), thereby connecting traditional Romani oral traditions with Bulgarian mythology. The Bulgarian Roma also possess superstitious beliefs regarding the Dhampir, a being that is a hybrid of vampire and human.

== Crime ==
Romani women and girls from Bulgaria frequently fall victim to human trafficking for the purposes of sexual exploitation and sexual abuse. Recent trends reveal an increase in child trafficking incidents within the Bulgarian Roma community, where Bulgarian Roma children are compelled to engage in labor and street begging in foreign nations, including Austria, France, and Sweden. Heroin use is prevalent among Bulgarian Roma. Widespread unemployment, poverty, and serious economic and social challenges drive many Bulgarian Roma to engage in criminal activities, primarily theft and burglary. Violent crime rates and sexual assault cases involving Romani communities in Bulgaria have increased significantly. Statistics from 1994 show that 88% of gang rapes were perpetrated by Bulgarian Roma males, and according to law enforcement data, Roma were responsible for approximately eight out of nine murders and burglaries, as well as 15 out of 16 robberies throughout Bulgaria. Research indicates that Romani men commit rape at higher rates compared to other groups. A 1992 investigation revealed that Bulgarian Romani men operating as pimps controlled a human trafficking operation targeting ethnic white Bulgarian girls between ages 12 and 14, subjecting them to kidnapping, gang rape, and severe psychological trauma before forcing them into street-level sex work.

== Health ==
Romani men have higher rates of sexually transmitted diseases such as HIV in Bulgaria due to low condom use, casual sex and having multiple sex partners.

== Problems of exclusion and discrimination ==
In a UNDP/ILO survey, Bulgarian Romani identified unemployment, economic hardship and discrimination in access to employment as major problems.

The Council of Europe body ECRI stated in its June 2003 third report on Bulgaria that Romani encounter "serious difficulties in many spheres of life", elaborating that:

"The main problems stem from the fact that the Roma districts are turning into ghettos. [...] Most Roma neighbourhoods consist of slums, precariously built without planning permission on land that often belongs to the municipalities [...]. As the Bulgarian authorities have not taken steps to address the situation, the people living in these districts have no access to basic public services, whether health care, public transport, waste collection or sanitation."

To which the Bulgarian government answered officially in the same document:

ECRI has correctly observed that members of the Roma community encounter "serious difficulties" "in many spheres of life". The rest of this paragraph, however, regrettably contains sweeping, grossly inaccurate generalizations ... Due to various objective and subjective factors, many (but by no means all!) members of the Roma community found it particularly difficult to adapt to the new realities of the market economy. "...Romani mahala-dwellers are still captives of the past, holding onto and behaving according to preconceptions about the socialist welfare state that clash with the modern realities of a market economy and privatisation". (Skopje Report, p.6)

More concretely, the allegation that the people living in these districts "have no access to basic public services" is largely inaccurate. Certain difficulties (though not remotely on the scale suggested) do exist in this regard, and the authorities are taking concrete measures to address them (see above). However, as the Advisor on Roma and Sinti issues at the OSCE, N. Gheorghe remarked during the Skopje meeting: "...many of the Roma confuse public services with rights to which they are entitled and which are guaranteed by the welfare state" (Skopje Report, p.16). ...

Concerning the issue of the electricity supply it should be noted that dwellers of such neighbourhoods sometimes refuse to pay their electricity bills. This attitude could at least in part be explained by the fact that "...Romani mahala-dwellers believe they have rights as citizens to electricity and other services, and that the state has an obligation to provide and to a large extent to subsidize them" (Skopje Report, p. 7). In these circumstances electricity suppliers may find themselves with no other option but to "sometimes cut off" the electricity supply in order to incite the consumers to commence honouring their debts. Such cut-offs are part of standard practice and the ethnic origin of the consumers is irrelevant in these cases.

With respect to welfare benefits, which allegedly "in some cases, moreover, Roma do not receive" while "they are entitled" to them, it should be underscored that Bulgaria's social welfare legislation sets uniform objective criteria for access to welfare benefits for all citizens, irrespective of their ethnic origin (furthermore, any discrimination, including on ethnic grounds is expressly prohibited by law). The question of who is entitled or not entitled to welfare benefits is determined by the relevant services on the basis of a means test. Every single decision of these services must be (and is) in written form and clearly motivated. If a claimant is not satisfied with a decision, he/she is entitled to appeal it before the regional welfare office. Consequently, this allegation of ECRI is also erroneous."

A monitoring report by the Open Society Institute found that Romani children and teenagers are less likely to enroll in primary and secondary schools than the majority population and less likely to complete their education if they do. Between 60% and 77% of Romani children enroll in primary education (ages 6–15), compared to 90-94% of ethnic Bulgarians. Only 6%-12% of Romani teenagers enroll in secondary education (ages 16–19). The drop-out rate is significant, but hard to measure, as many are formally enrolled but rarely attend classes.

The report also indicates that Romani children and teenagers attend de facto segregated "Roma schools" in majority-Romani neighbourhoods and villages. These "Roma schools" offer inferior quality education; many are in bad physical condition and lack necessary facilities such as computers. As a result, Romani literacy rates, already below those for ethnic Bulgarians, are much lower still for Romani who have attended segregated schools.

The official position of the Bulgarian government to such segregation is:

"There had never been a policy of "segregation" of Roma children in the national education system. The fact that in some neighbourhoods in certain towns particular schools were attended predominantly by pupils of Roma origin was an unintended consequence of the administrative division of the school system. According to the rules valid for all children irrespective of their ethnic origin, admittance to any public school was linked administratively to the domicile of the family. In neighbourhoods where the population was predominantly of Roma origin, this system produced schools, attended predominantly by pupils of Roma origin. It is precisely this situation that the authorities are taking special measures to rectify. Therefore, the word "segregation" with respect to Roma children is inaccurate."

Romani children are often sent to special schools for children with intellectual disabilities or boarding schools for children with "deviant behavior" (so-called "delinquent schools"). According to reports of the Bulgarian Helsinki Committee (BHC), Romani made up half the number of students in schools for children with intellectual disabilities and about two-thirds of the students of the boarding schools, where the BHC found a variety of human rights abuses, including physical violence. In both sets of special schools, the quality of teaching is very poor and essential things such as desks, textbooks and teaching materials are inadequate or altogether lacking.

On two occasions, the European Committee of Social Rights has found violations of the European Social Charter in situations with Bulgaria's Romani population: in 2006, concerning right to housing, and in 2008, concerning right to health—in both cases on complaints from the European Roma Rights Centre.

=== Political representation ===
According to a report of Politeia, "For the most of the 1990s the only representation the Romani got was through the mainstream political parties. This was a very limited form of representation in which one or two Romani had a symbolic presence in Parliament during each term." The Bulgarian Constitution does not allow political parties based on ethnic, religious, or racist principles or ideology. However, "Twenty one Roma political organizations were founded between 1997 and 2003 in Bulgaria [...]".

In the 2005 Bulgarian parliamentary election, three Romani parties took part: Euroroma, Movement for an Equal Public Model (as part of a coalition led by the Union of Democratic Forces) and the Civil Union "Roma" (as part of a coalition led by the Bulgarian Socialist Party). Currently, the Movement for Rights and Freedoms represents Muslim Romani. The party relies on the biggest share of Romani people, 44% of the total Romani vote, including non-Muslims.

Romani integration programmes funded by the European Union have had mixed success.

== Notable people ==
- 100 Kila, rapper
- Azis, singer

== See also ==
- NGO Roma Together
