= Zlatina Nedeva =

Bulgarian actress

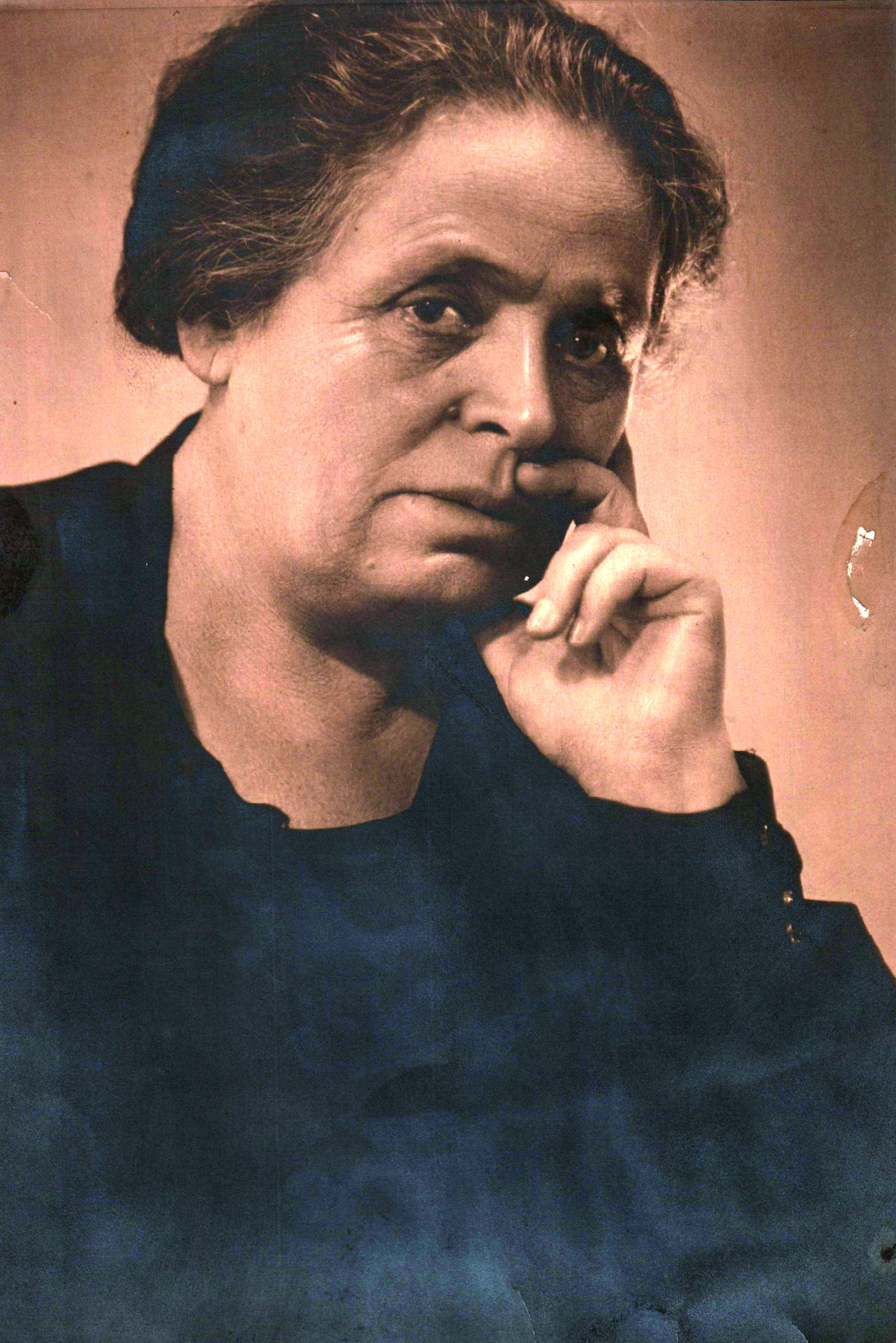
- A Portrait photo of Nedeva in 1937
- Born: Zlatina Ivanova Popova; November 26, 1878; Tryavna, Bulgaria
- Died: May 21, 1941 (aged 62); Sofia, Bulgaria

Zlatina Nedeva (1878–1941) was a Bulgarian actress and director.

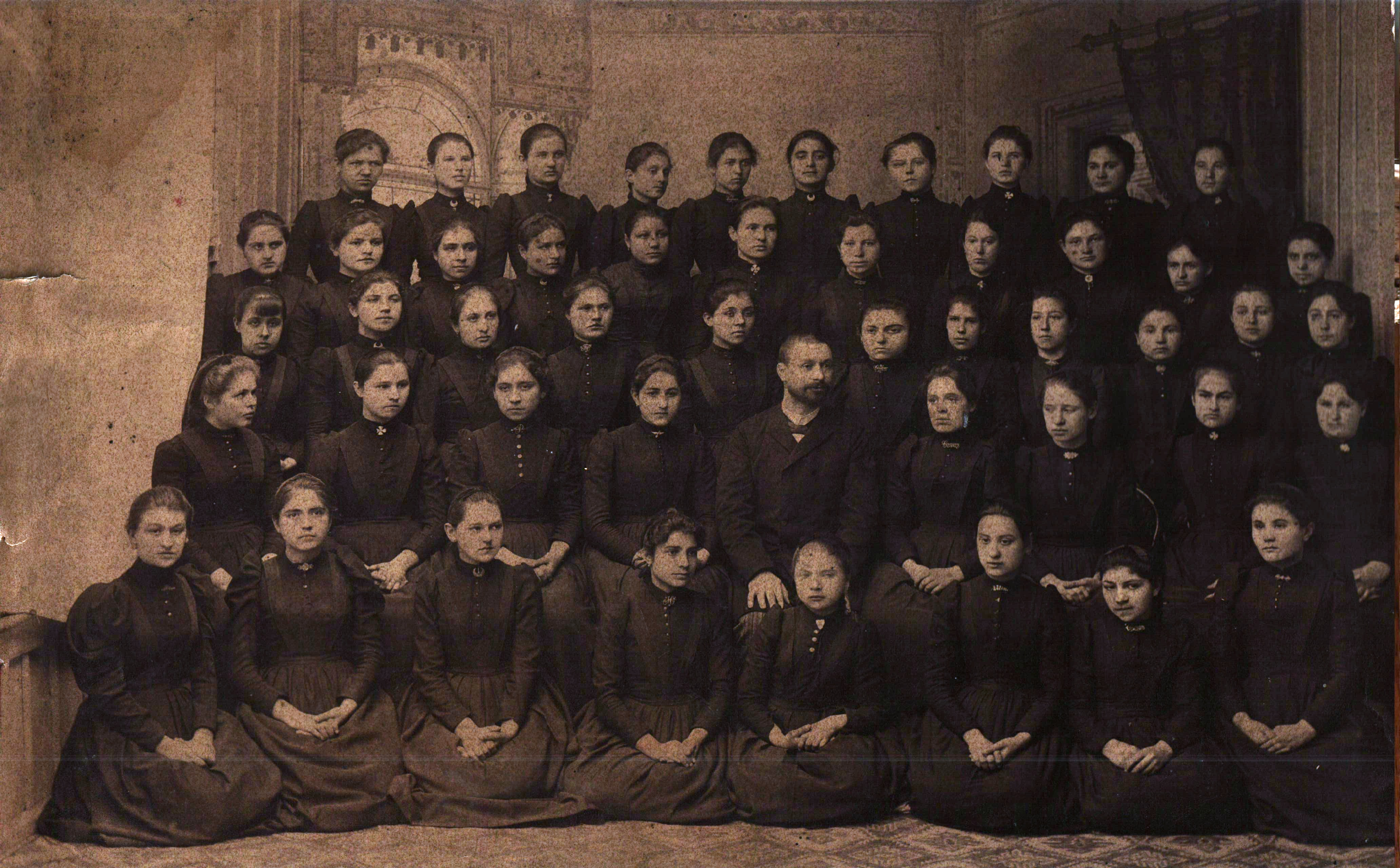
Zlatina Nedeva with school mates in the Veliko Tarnovo girls high-school

== Biography ==
She was born 26 November 1878 in Tryavna. Her sisters Nevena Teneva and Marta Popova were drama artists. She graduated from the Veliko Tarnovo girl high-school in 1894.

Zlatina Nedeva relocated to Zagreb and graduated as a drama artist. She made her first debut in the Croatian National Theatre in Zagreb in the role of Elisaveta in Mary Stuart of Friedrich Schiler. In 1903 she became and actress in the "Salza i Smyah" troupe in Sofia.

During the periods of 1904–1920, 1926–1930, 1932-1934 and 1936–1941, she was acting in the Ivan Vazov National Theatre in Sofia, Bulgaria.

Between 1921 and 1924 She also worked in the traveling theater "Kameren Theater" that she founded. In 1934 and 1935 she was a director and producer in the Pleven and Burgas Theaters.

== Major roles ==
- Anisiya - "The Power of Darkness" by Leo Tolstoy
- Masha - "Three Sisters" by Anton Chehov
- Vasilisa - "The lower depths" by Maxim Gorky
- Zoya - "Borislav" by Ivan Vazov
- Maria - "Ivaylo" by Ivan Vazov
- Vida - "Boryana" by Yordan Yovkov
- G-zha Maslarska - "Milionerat" by Yordan Yovkov
