= Bratan, Sliven Province =

Village in Sliven Province, Bulgaria

Bratan Братан
- Village
- Location in Bulgaria
- Coordinates: 42.9859°N 26.3416°E
- Country: Bulgaria
- Province: Sliven Province
- Municipality: Kotel
- Elevation: 639 m (2,096 ft)

Population (2013)
  - Total: 6
- Time zone: UTC+2 (EET)
  - Summer (DST): UTC+3 (EEST)

Bratan (Bulgarian: Братан) is a village in southeastern Bulgaria. It is located in Kotel Municipality, Sliven Province.

== Landmarks and Locations ==
The Golyama Kamchia river passes through Bratan, creating conditions for fishing and outdoor recreation.

Nearby, in Kotel, the Pantheon of Georgi Rakovski, Museum of Renaissance and Natural History Museum and Historical Museum can be visited.

About 39 km northwest from the village is located village of Zheravna which features an architectural reserve, where over 200 wooden houses built during the Revival period are located.
