= Mustafa Shibil =

- Mustafa Şibil/Şibiloğlu
- Died: 1856–1870

Mustafa Shibiloglu, shortened form: Shibil (Turkish: Mustafa Şibil/Şibiloğlu, lit. Mustafa son of Shibil), was a notable Muslim Roma born in Ottoman Bulgaria in the village Gradets, to a Turkish Roma Drandari Musician Family.

== Life ==
During the Crimean War (1853–1856), with the help of the Kirdzhalis (of which he was a member), he opposed Ottoman sovereignty and robbed the Orthodox Christian Bulgarian population. He gained local power in the Balkan Mountains around Sliven.

Panayot Hitov described him as "well built, tall, fair-skinned and broad-shouldered". Shibil was in love with Radka, a Bulgarian woman. Shibil's other wife was Jenda, who was also a Bulgarian woman. Mustafa Shibil held the title of Agha and lived like a Sultan in Sliven, with many homes and a big herd of goats. It is said that the people around him feared him.

=== Death ===
Mustafa Shibil was killed sometime between 1856 and 1870.

=== Legacy ===
Several Turkish Roma families in Bulgaria and those who emigrated to Turkey claim to be descendants of Mustafa Shibil, especially the musician Roma groups in Bulgaria. The titular character of Shibil by Yordan Yovkov is a fictionalized version of Mustafa Shibil. This story was adapted into a film twice.
