= Gradsko =

Gradsko may refer to:

- Gradsko, Bulgaria, a small village in south-eastern Bulgaria
- Gradsko, North Macedonia, a village in North Macedonia
- Gradsko Municipality, a municipality in North Macedonia
