= List of villages in Bulgaria =

This is a list of villages in Bulgaria by province.

- List of villages in Blagoevgrad Province
- List of villages in Burgas Province
- List of villages in Dobrich Province
- List of villages in Gabrovo Province
- List of villages in Haskovo Province
- List of villages in Kardzhali Province
- List of villages in Kyustendil Province
- List of villages in Lovech Province
- List of villages and towns in Montana Province
- List of villages in Pazardzhik Province
- List of villages in Pernik Province
- List of villages in Pleven Province
- List of villages in Plovdiv Province
- List of villages in Razgrad Province
- List of villages in Rousse Province
- List of villages in Shumen Province
- List of villages in Silistra Province
- List of villages in Sliven Province
- List of villages in Smolyan Province
- List of villages in Sofia City
- List of villages in Sofia Province
- List of villages in Stara Zagora Province
- List of villages in Targovishte Province
- List of villages in Varna Province
- List of villages in Veliko Tarnovo Province
- List of villages in Vidin Province
- List of villages in Vratsa Province
- List of villages in Yambol Province

== See also ==
- List of villages in Europe
- Bulgaria
- Provinces of Bulgaria
- List of cities and towns in Bulgaria
- Municipalities of Bulgaria
