= Krushare =

Village of Bulgaria

Krushare Крушаре
- Village
- Location within Bulgaria
- Coordinates: 42°33′N 26°22′E
- Country: Bulgaria
- Oblast: Sliven
- Opština: Sliven

Government
  - Mayor (Municipality): Stefan Radev (GERB)
  - Mayor (Town Hall): Dimo Stankov

Area
  - Total: 29.134 km^{2} (11.249 sq mi)
- Elevation: 144 m (472 ft)

Population (2024)
  - Total: 2,253
  - Density: 77.33/km^{2} (200.3/sq mi)
- Postal code: 8877
- Area code: 04514
- Vehicle registration: СН

Krushare (Bulgarian: Крушаре) is a village in Bulgaria. It is situated in Sliven Municipality, Sliven Province.
