= Malko Selo =

Malko Selo Малко село
- Village
- Location in Bulgaria
- Coordinates: 42.9787°N 26.5064°E
- Country: Bulgaria
- Province: Sliven Province
- Municipality: Kotel
- Elevation: 400 m (1,300 ft)

Population (2021)
  - Total: 483
- Time zone: UTC+2 (EET)
  - Summer (DST): UTC+3 (EEST)

Malko Selo (Малко село) is located roughly 20 km northeast from the town of Kotel, and 376 km in the same direction from the capital Sofia. The village has a regular bus service.

== Landmarks and Locations ==
The Zlosten protected area features eleven caves, among which the "Glacier" is a national landmark, measuring 1,111 meters in length and reaching a depth of 242 meters. Another significant cave is "Rakovsky," where the Revolutionary Rakovski began writing his book "Forest Passenger" in 1854. Additional caves in the region include "Subatta" and "40 Beds."

The Urushka Rocks are also nearby, which are a natural fortress situated about 4 km from Kotel along the route to Omurtag.
