= Kotel Municipality =

- Municipality
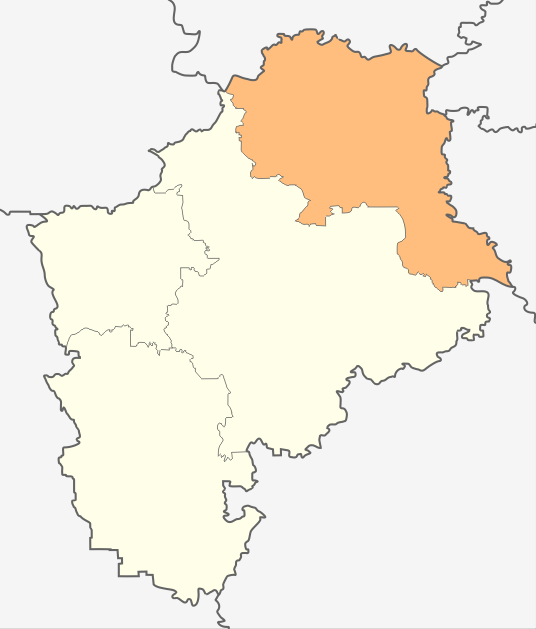
- Location of Kotel Municipality in Sliven Province

- Location of Kotel Municipality in Bulgaria
- Coordinates: 42°53′00″N 26°27′00″E
- Country: Bulgaria
- Province: Sliven Province
- Capital: Kotel

Area
  - Total: 858.306 km^{2} (331.394 sq mi)

Population (2011)
  - Total: 19,391
  - Density: 22.592/km^{2} (58.513/sq mi)
- Postal code: 8970
- Area code: 0453

Kotel Municipality (Bulgarian: Община Котел) is a municipality in the Sliven Province of Bulgaria.

== Demography ==
Ethnic composition of Kotel Municipality
1. Bulgarians (36.2%)
2. Turks (29.9%)
3. Gypsies/Romani (24.7%)
4. No identification (8.14%)
5. Other (1.05%)

At the 2011 census, the population of Kotel was 19,391. Most of the inhabitants were either Bulgarians (36.22%), Turks (29.87%), or Gypsies/Romani (24.7%). 8.14% of the population's ethnicity was unknown.

== Villages ==
In addition to the capital town of Kotel, there are 21 villages in the municipality:

- Borintsi
- Bratan
- Gradets
- Dubova
- Zheravna
- Katunishte
- Kipilovo
- Malko Selo
- Medven
- Mokren
- Neykovo
- Oplovo
- Ostra Moguila
- Pudarevo
- Sedlarevo
- Sokolartsi
- Strelsti
- Ticha
- Topuzevo
- Filaretovo
- Yablanovo
