= Borintsi =

Borintsi Боринци
- Village
- Location in Bulgaria
- Coordinates: 42.9348°N 26.2125°E
- Country: Bulgaria
- Province: Sliven Province
- Municipality: Kotel
- Elevation: 478 m (1,568 ft)

Population (2021)
  - Total: 121
- Time zone: UTC+2 (EET)
  - Summer (DST): UTC+3 (EEST)

Borintsi (Боринци) is a village in southeastern Bulgaria. It is located in Kotel Municipality, Sliven region.

Nearby are the towns of Elena and Kotel which attract local and foreign tourists with their cultural significance and Renaissance architecture.
