= Gorno Aleksandrovo =

Coordinates: 42°39′16″N 26°37′59″E

Gorno Aleksandrovo (Bulgarian: Горно Александрово) is a small village in the Sliven Municipality in Bulgaria. The village is named after the governor of Eastern Rumelia, Aleksandar Bogoridi.
