= Sliven Municipality =

- Municipality
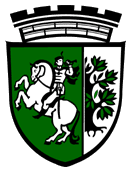
- Coat of arms

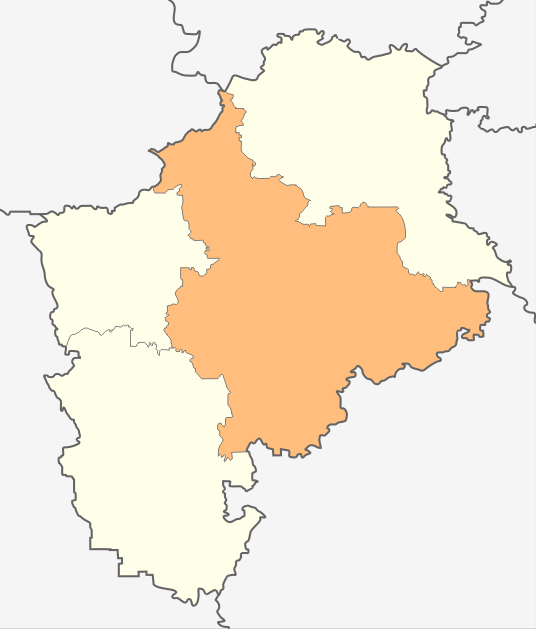
- Location of Sliven Municipality in Sliven Province

- Location of Sliven Municipality in Bulgaria
- Coordinates: 42°41′00″N 26°20′00″E
- Country: Bulgaria
- Province: Sliven Province
- Capital: Sliven

Area
  - Total: 1,366.63 km^{2} (527.66 sq mi)
- Elevation: 261 m (856 ft)

Population (2011)
  - Total: 125,268
  - Density: 91.6620/km^{2} (237.403/sq mi)

Sliven Municipality (Bulgarian: Община Сливен) is a municipality in the Sliven Province of Bulgaria.

== Demography ==
Ethnic composition of Sliven Municipality
1. Bulgarians (70.8%)
2. Turks (3.35%)
3. Gypsies/Romani (9.70%)
4. No identification (14.9%)
5. Other (1.20%)

At the 2011 census, the population of Sliven was 125,268. Most of the inhabitants were Bulgarians (70.65%) with a minority of Turks (3.35%) and Gypsies/Romani (9.7%). 14.88% of the population's ethnicity was unknown.

== Villages ==
In addition to the capital town of Sliven, there are 44 villages in the municipality:

- Bikovo
- Binkos
- Blatets
- Bozhevtsi
- Bozadzhii
- Byala
- Vaglen
- Gavrailovo
- Gergevets
- Glufishevo
- Glushnik
- Golyamo Chochoveni
- Gorno Aleksandrovo
- Gradsko
- Dragodanovo
- Zhelyu Voyvoda
- Zaychari
- Zlati Voyvoda
- Izgrev
- Ichera
- Kaloyanovo
- Kamen
- Kermen (town)
- Kovachite
- Krushare
- Malko Chochoveni
- Mechkarevo
- Mladovo
- Nikolaevo
- Novachevo
- Panaretovtsi
- Rakovo
- Samuilovo
- Seliminovo
- Skobelevo
- Sotiria
- Sredorek
- Stara Reka
- Staro Selo
- Strupets
- Topolchane
- Trapoklovo
- Chintulovo
- Chokoba
