= Gradsko, Bulgaria =

Village in Sliven municipality, Bulgaria

Coordinates: 42°46′N 26°08′E

Gradsko (Bulgarian: Градско) is a small village in southeastern Bulgaria. It is situated in the Sliven Municipality of the Sliven Province. The population was 456 at the end of December, 2013.
