= Topolchane, Sliven Province =

Coordinates: 42°39′4″N 26°25′39″E

Topolchane is a village located in Sliven Municipality, 10 km southeast of Sliven, Bulgaria, near the road to Burgas.

== History ==
Near the village there are Thracian tumuli which were also used in medieval times.

In the summer of 2007, the crew of Thracological Expedition for Tumular Investigations, led by Georgi Kitov.
