= Gradets, Sliven Province =

Village in Kotel municipality, Sliven Province, in Bulgaria

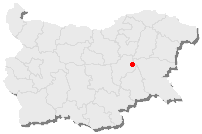
Location of Gradets, Sliven Province in Bulgaria

Gradets (Bulgarian: Градец, "small town") is a village in southeastern Bulgaria, part of Kotel municipality, Sliven Province. It lies at 42°47′N 26°32′E, 380 m above sea level. As of 2019, the mayor is Vesselin Urunov of the GERB party (Citizens for European Development of Bulgaria) and the population of Gradets is 2,434, which makes it the second most populous village in Bulgaria, after Aydemir, Silistra Province, and the most populous in Bulgarian Thrace.

== Demographics ==
Gradets is situated in the Eastern Balkan Mountains, along the valley of the Luda Kamchiya. Gradets is characteristic because the vast majority of its residents are Bulgarian Roma (in 2000, 5,500 of 6,000 according to the then-mayor). In the early 20th century, Gradets had only around twenty Roma households, but their number later grew rapidly.

Population of Gradets (1934-2019)
Census	1934	1946	1956	1965	1975	1985	1992	2001	2011	2019
Population	2,458	2,797	2,351	2,649	2,849	3,130	3,238	3,932	3,759	4,153

Notable natives include politician Petar Gudev (1862–1932), officer Radko Dimitriev (1859–1918) and Mustafa Shibil, a 19th-century Turkish Muslim Roma brigand who served as Yordan Yovkov's prototype for a hajduk character, as well as possibly the noted socialist Christian Rakovsky (1873–1941).

== Gallery ==
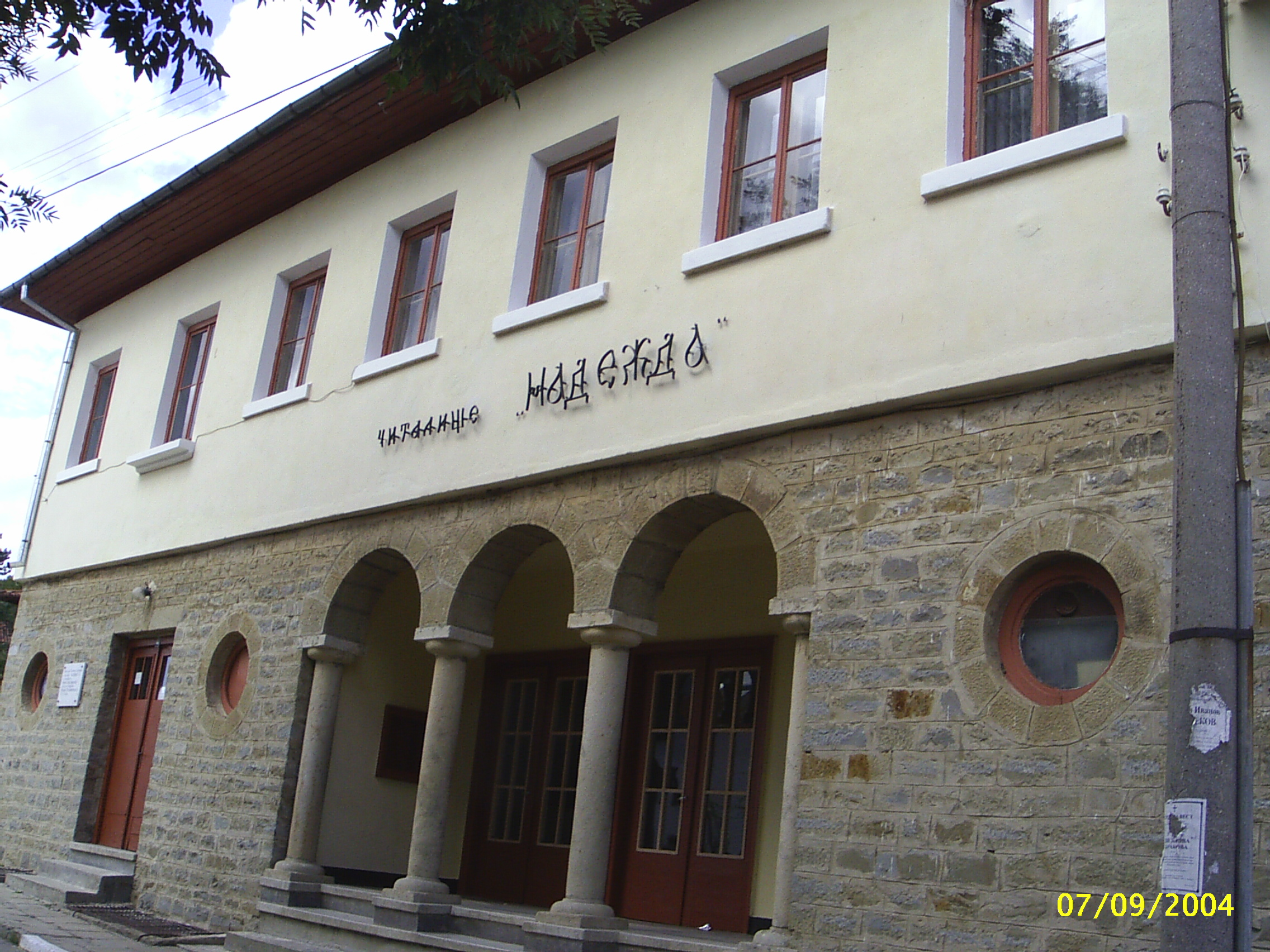
The Nadezhda chitalishte (cultural centre), founded in 1869

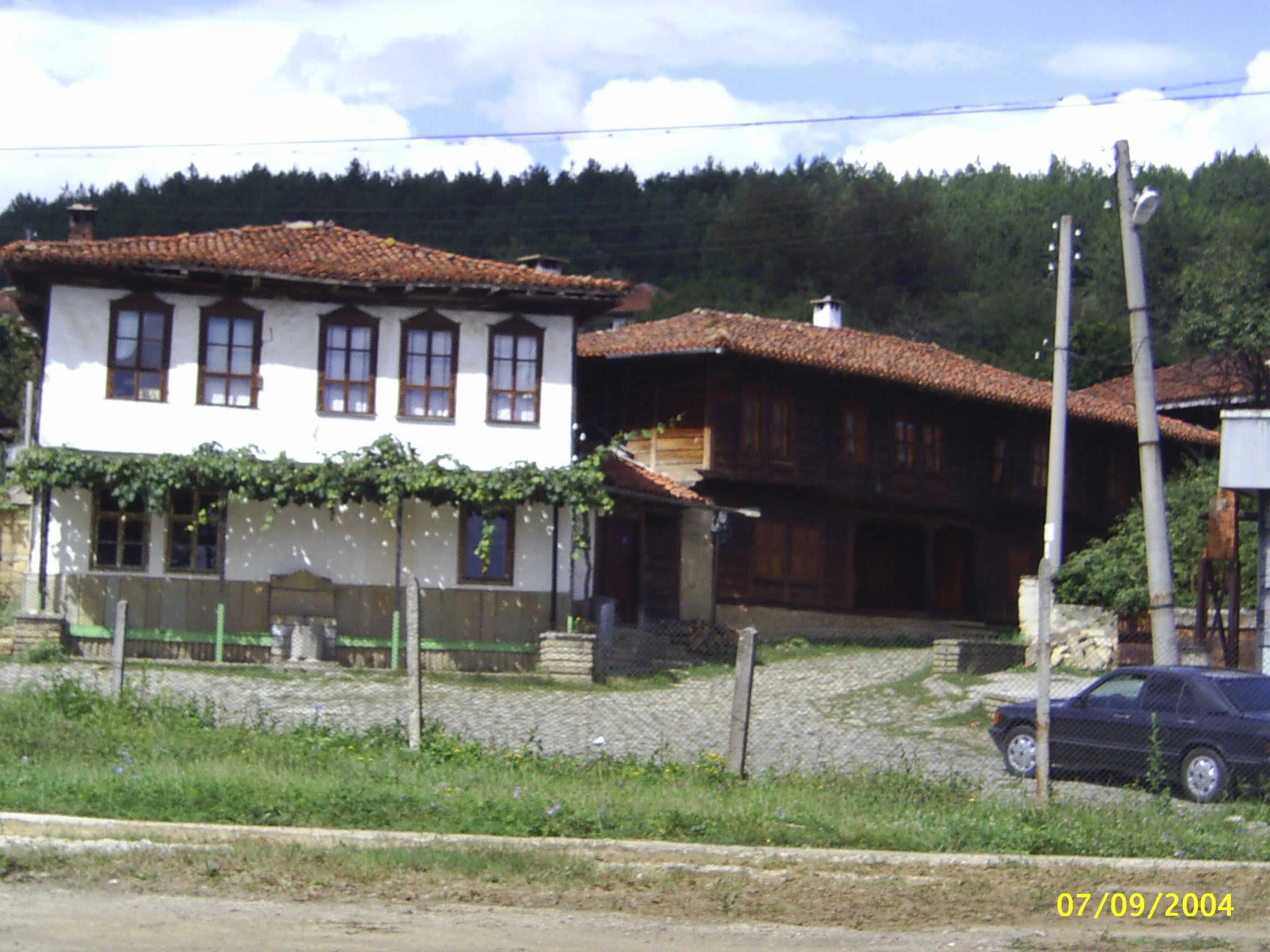
The Parlapanov Fountain

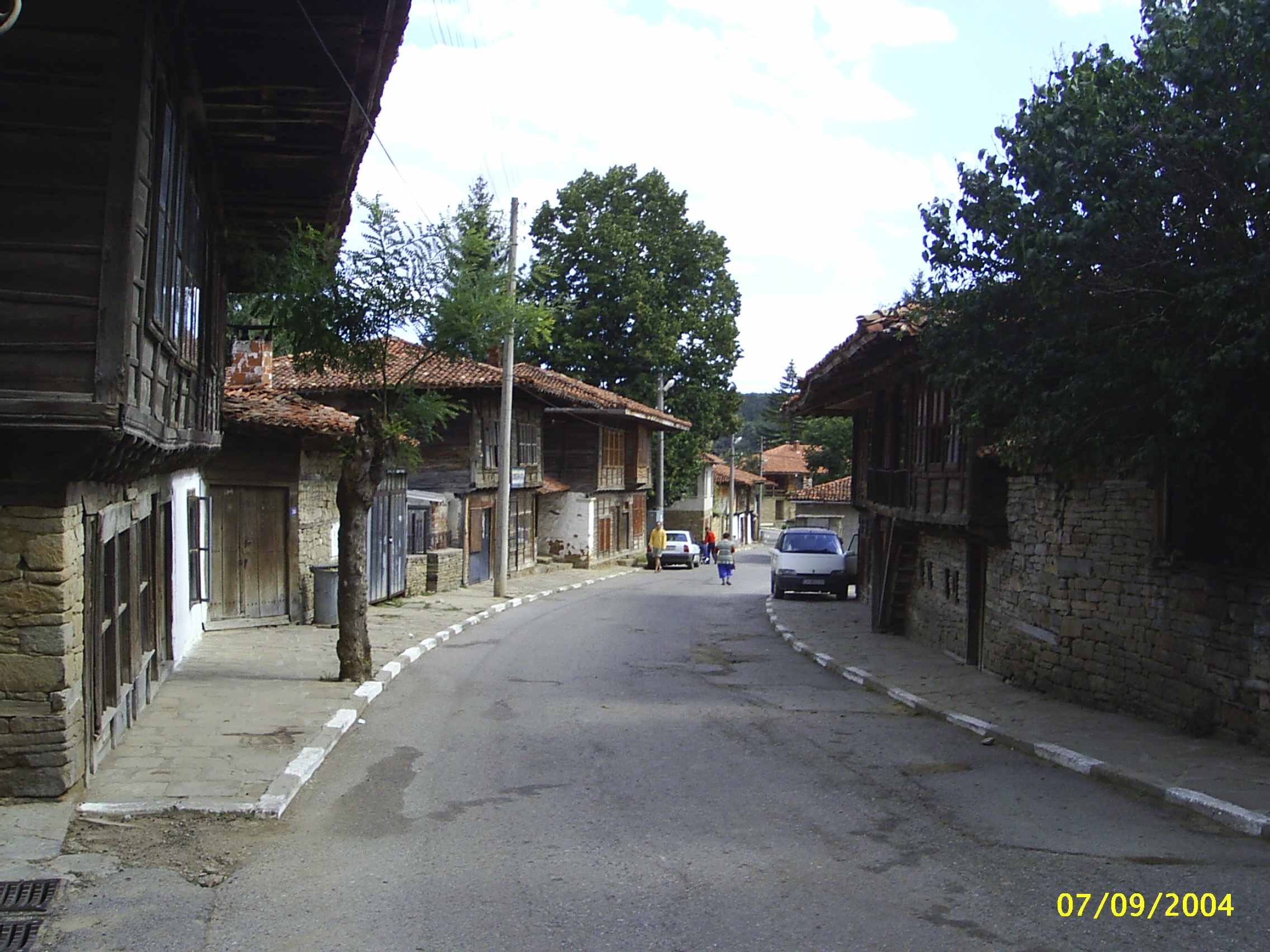
The Main Street
