= Zheravna =

Village in Bulgaria

Coordinates: 42°50′N 26°28′E

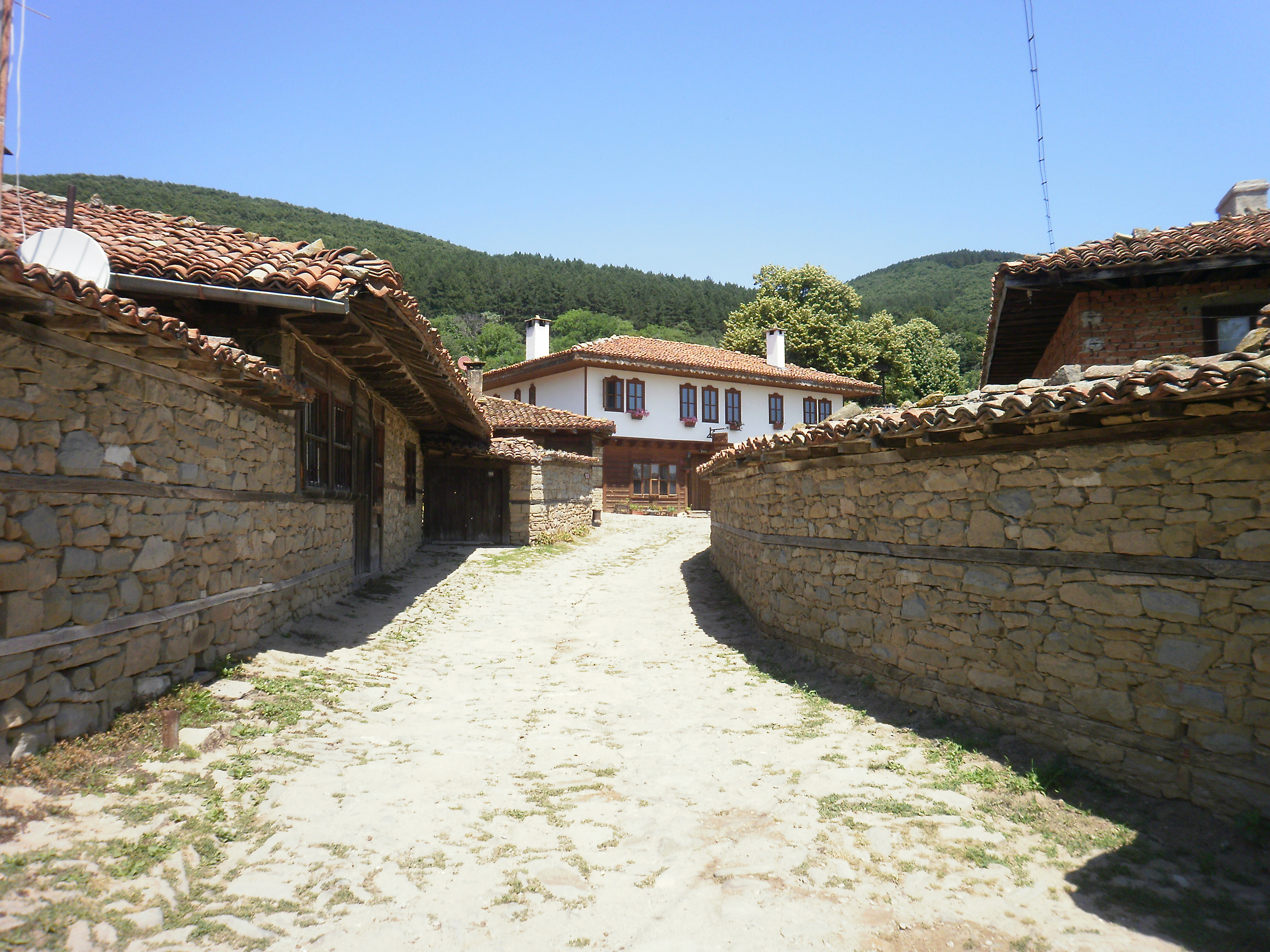
A street in Zheravna in 2011

Zheravna (Bulgarian: Жеравна [ˈʒɛrɐvnɐ]) is a village in central eastern Bulgaria located 579 meters above sea level, and is part of the Kotel municipality in the Sliven Province. The village, set in a small valley at the southern foot of the eastern Balkan Mountains, is an architectural reserve of national importance consisting of more than 200 wooden houses from the Bulgarian National Revival period (18th and 19th century), and a tourist destination.

The village emerged between the 12th and 14th centuries, and by the 18th century had grown to become a cultural and handicraft centre. This increase in wealth gave rise to the present architectural appearance of the village, comprising one- or two-story wooden houses surrounded by stone walls and cobblestone alleys.

Popular sights in the village include the museum house of the merchant Rusi Chorbadzhi from the early 18th century, the Church of St Nicholas inaugurated in 1834 and housing icons from the 18th and early 19th century, the museum house of the noted writer Yordan Yovkov born in 1880, the art gallery occupying the old school, and the museum house of the educator Sava Filaterov.

As of September 2005 the village had a population of 460.

== Geography ==
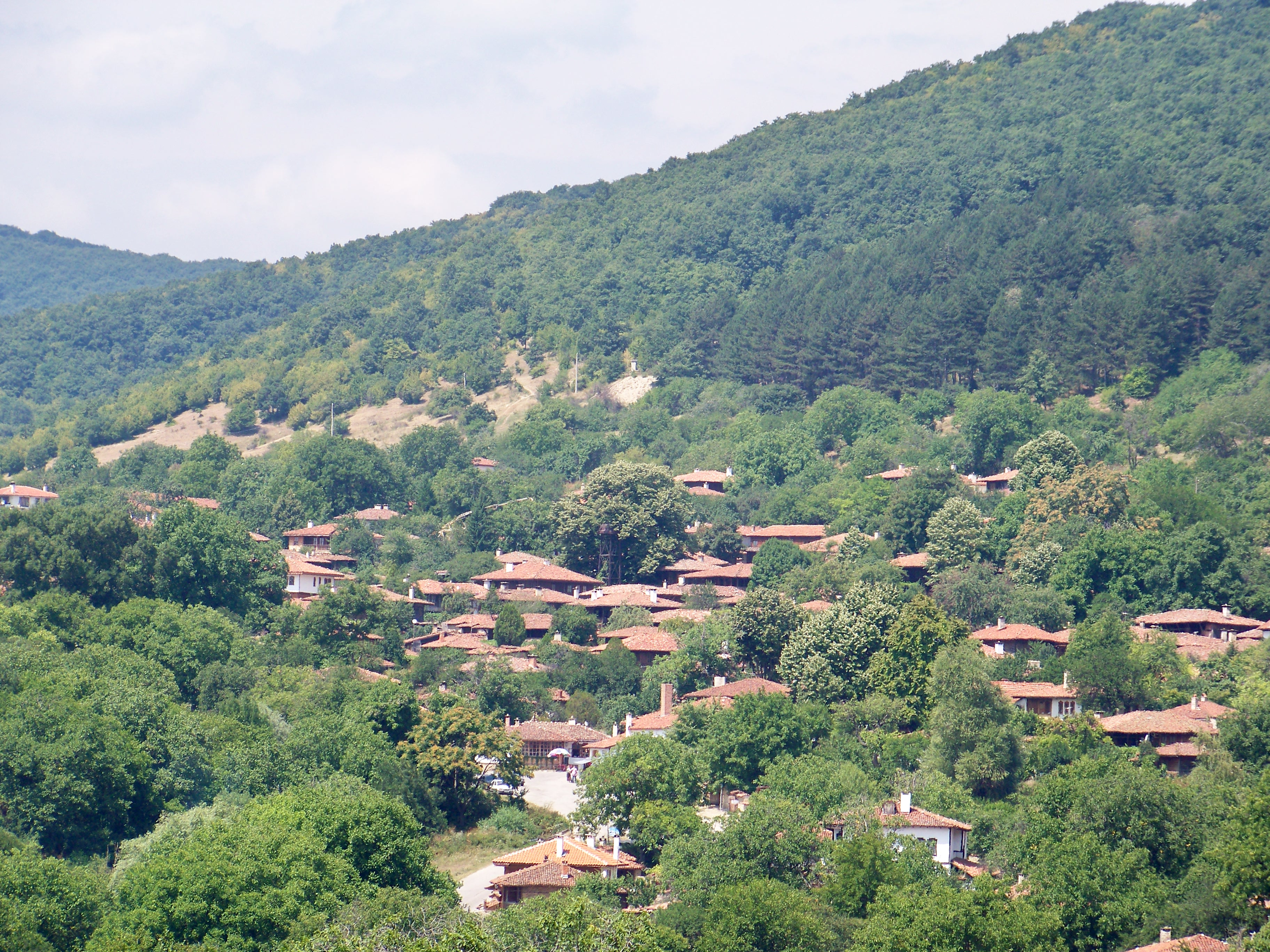
Overview of Zheravna

Zheravna is situated in the middle of Stara Planina in the municipality of Kotel. It is situated 12 kilometers away from Kotel, 110 km away from Burgas and 330 km away from Sofia, the capital of Bulgaria. The territory of Zheravna covers an area of 5,000 m^{2} with an average altitude of 650 meters. The terrain is mountainous, and there is also a valley, crossed by wooded hills. The highest peak is Razboyna at 1128 meters above sea level and is located 6 km west of the village. The natural resources of Zheravna consist mostly of strangely shaped rock formations, mysterious cave complexes, and diverse flora and fauna. Zheravna is rich in water resources with springs and rivers supplied by rain and melting snow. Zheravna is rich in forest vegetation and both deciduous and coniferous trees are common. Animal diversity is great and includes wild boar, roe deer, red deer, jackal, wolf, rabbit, quail, partridge and others.

The climate in Zheravna is a typical mountain climate with an early autumn, very cold winter, and late spring. 57.5% of the days in the year are windless. Winter winds are strongest and reach average maximum speed 3.3 m/s. The air is clean and dry. The Zheravna environment can be defined as an ecologically clean area as there is no industry in the town and is away from big cities.

== History ==
Historically the area contained an old Thracian village called Potuka (and now there is an area within Zheravna itself called Potuka). There are several versions for the origin of the name of the village. One is that it comes from the Bulgarian word for crane, "zherav", although this is unlikely as cranes do not live in the area. Alternatively, some speculate that it comes from older Slavic root words meaning watermill given the mills in the area: "zherna", "zherka", and "jerkov".

In the previous few centuries Zheravna had been called Zheruna but after the Liberation of Bulgaria in 1878, the name gradually changed into Zheravna. Over time crafts, livestock, and trade developed here. The village prospered in the 17th century because it was on the main road to the old capital of Tarnovo. The rooms of the houses have carved ceilings and exquisite decoration on the doors, windows, and iconostases. Today, the old school is turned into a gallery, and many fountains and old mills are preserved. There were schools of carving in the town.

== Tourism and places of interest ==
Zheravna is an easy location to travel to, situated 32 km from the Petolachkata junction on the road from Sofia to Burgas. The distances to the cities of Sliven, Burgas, Varna and Sofia are respectively 48, 110, 184 and 333 km.

There are many uninhabited houses in Zheravna.

Much of the uninhabited houses were bought and restored, in order to attract tourists and they are categorized as guest houses. Each year, Zeravna is visited by about 20,000 tourists.

Most of the houses in Zheravna were built during the Bulgarian Revival, but their inner interior has been since renovated.

The Saint Nicholas Church was built in 1834. It was originally painted by master painters Jordan Mihajlovic from Elena and Georgi and Gencho from Tryavna. Today the church is adorned with a rich collection of icons, stone sculptures and church plates. The icons are dated from the second half of the 18th and the early 19th century.

Zheravna is a heritage site. Today, there are nearly 200 houses registered as monuments of culture, each of them built some 150 to 300 years ago. During the Revival, Zheravna became a major cultural center.

The village took an active part in the resistance against Ottoman rule and participated in the April Uprising.

The times of the village Revival period is preserved in the local museums: the House of Sava Filaretov; the Home of Yordan Yovkov, the St. Nicholas Church, the Old school - now an art gallery; the House of Rusi Chorbadzhi. Close to Zheravna is the town of Kotel with its Natural History Museum; Galatan school; Kyorpev house; Museum of the Revival; and the village of Medven where House of Zahari Stoyanov is. Other interesting thing is the Zheravna National costume festival in the same village.

Other interesting sight seeings are the Chorbadzhi Rusi's house and the native house of the famous Bulgarian writer Yordan Yovkov, as well as the house of Sava Filaretov. Moreover, there is a traditional festival of national costumes held every summer, which is relatively popular with tourists. The popular Festival of Folklore Costume lasts up to 3 days and people wear traditional old folklore costumes, masks or uniforms and sleep under the stars near an open fire.

== People born in Zheravna ==
Rusi Chorbadzi was a wealthy landowner and master in Zheravna and later a mayor. He was one of the richest men in the village, had some 30,000 sheep and was trading with the Turks and the Greeks. When the kurdzhalii came to the village, he devised a plan to hide all the village girls in the woods, for which he and he two sons were murdered by the vagabonds. The house of Chorbadzi is a museum now and it narrates the life of Rusi – a wealthy man involved in the governance of the village. The original openwork carvings above the doors in the framework of the cupboards are Impressive.

- Georgi Bonchev (1866-1955), geologist
- Boncho Georgiev (1849-1899), merchant and owner of the animal shop for meat. He was mayor after the Liberation
- Petar Dimitrov (1848-1919), diplomat
- Todor Ikonomov (1835-1892), politician
- Yordan Yovkov (1880-1937), writer
- Rhino Popovic (1773-1858), teacher and writer
- Sergei Todorov (1896-1974), a former mayor of Varna
- Russi Chorbadji gaffer and mayor at the end of the 18th century
- Vasil Stoyanov (1839-1910), philologist
- Sava Filaretov (1825-1863), educator
- Nikolay Dimitrov (1919-1993), a mayor and politician contributed to preserving the look of the village Zheravna
- Rayu Topalov (1908-1990) founder of museums in Zheravna
- Ivan Raev (1935-1978) actor, director, writer
- Eng. Vasil Rankov (1874-1950), founder of the pioneer (engineer) troops in Bulgaria.
- Ivan Tsankov (1840-1925), Bulgarian revolutionary.

== Honours ==
Zheravna Glacier on Greenwich Island in the South Shetland Islands, Antarctica is named after the village.

== Gallery ==
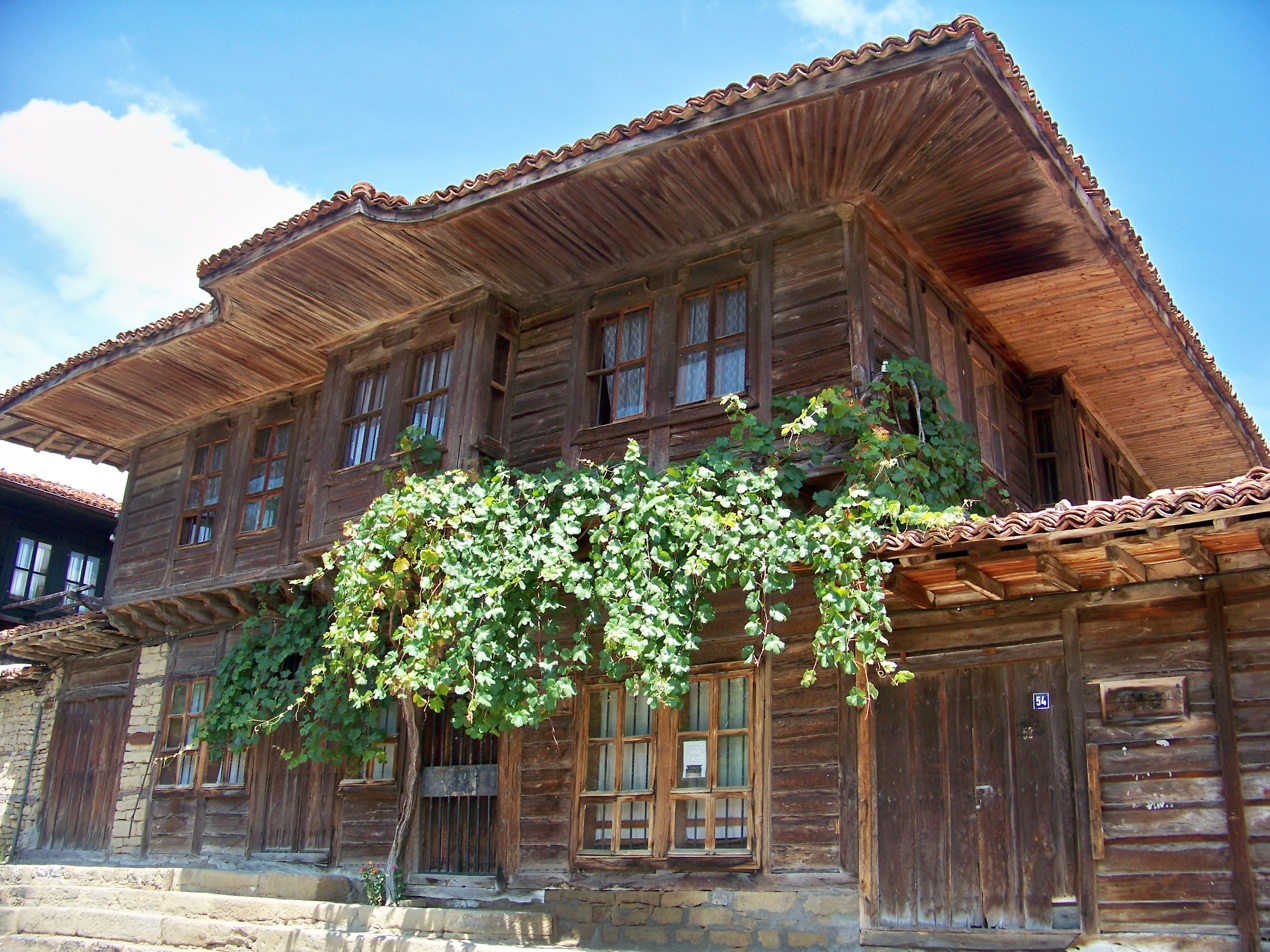

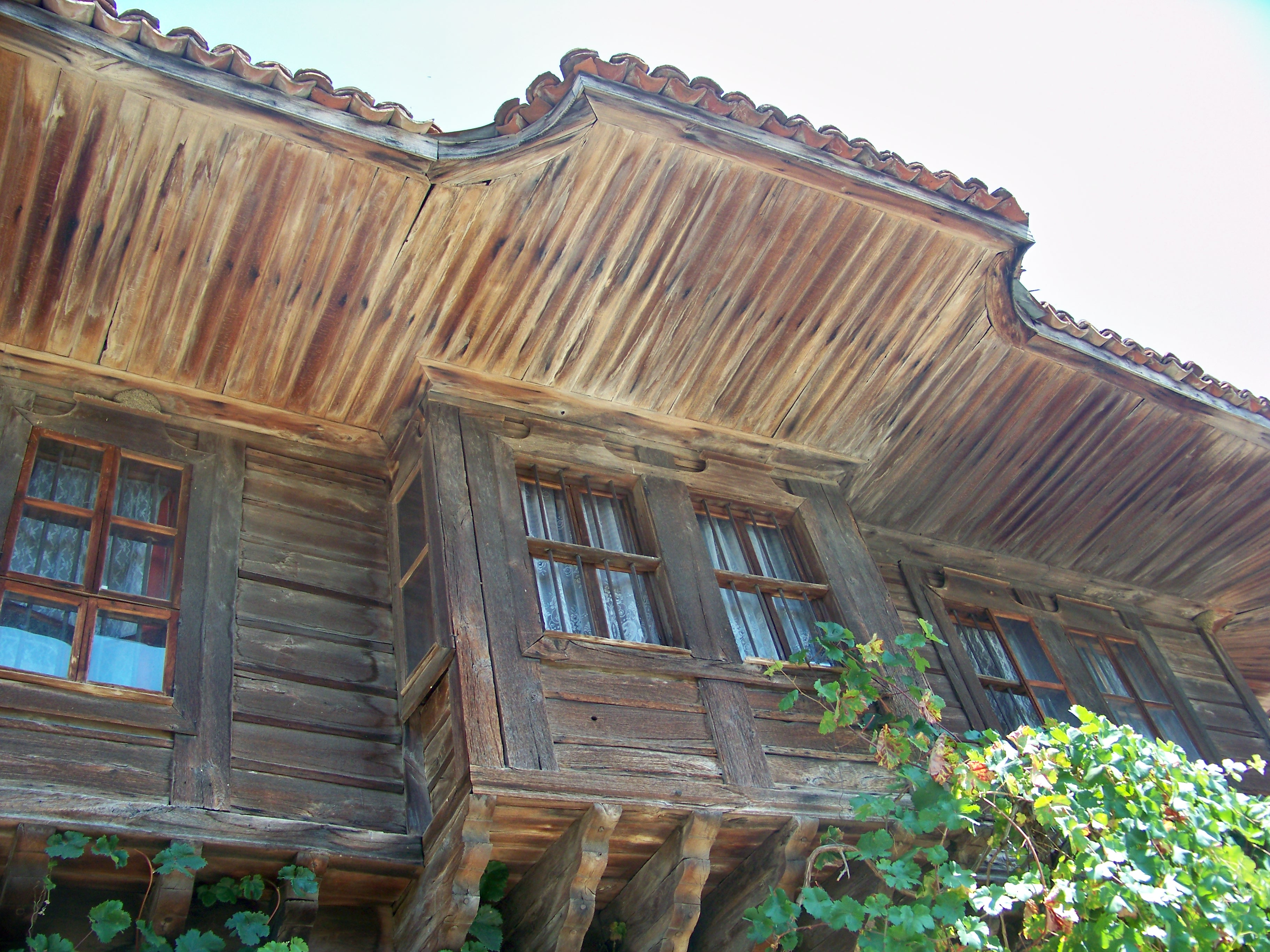

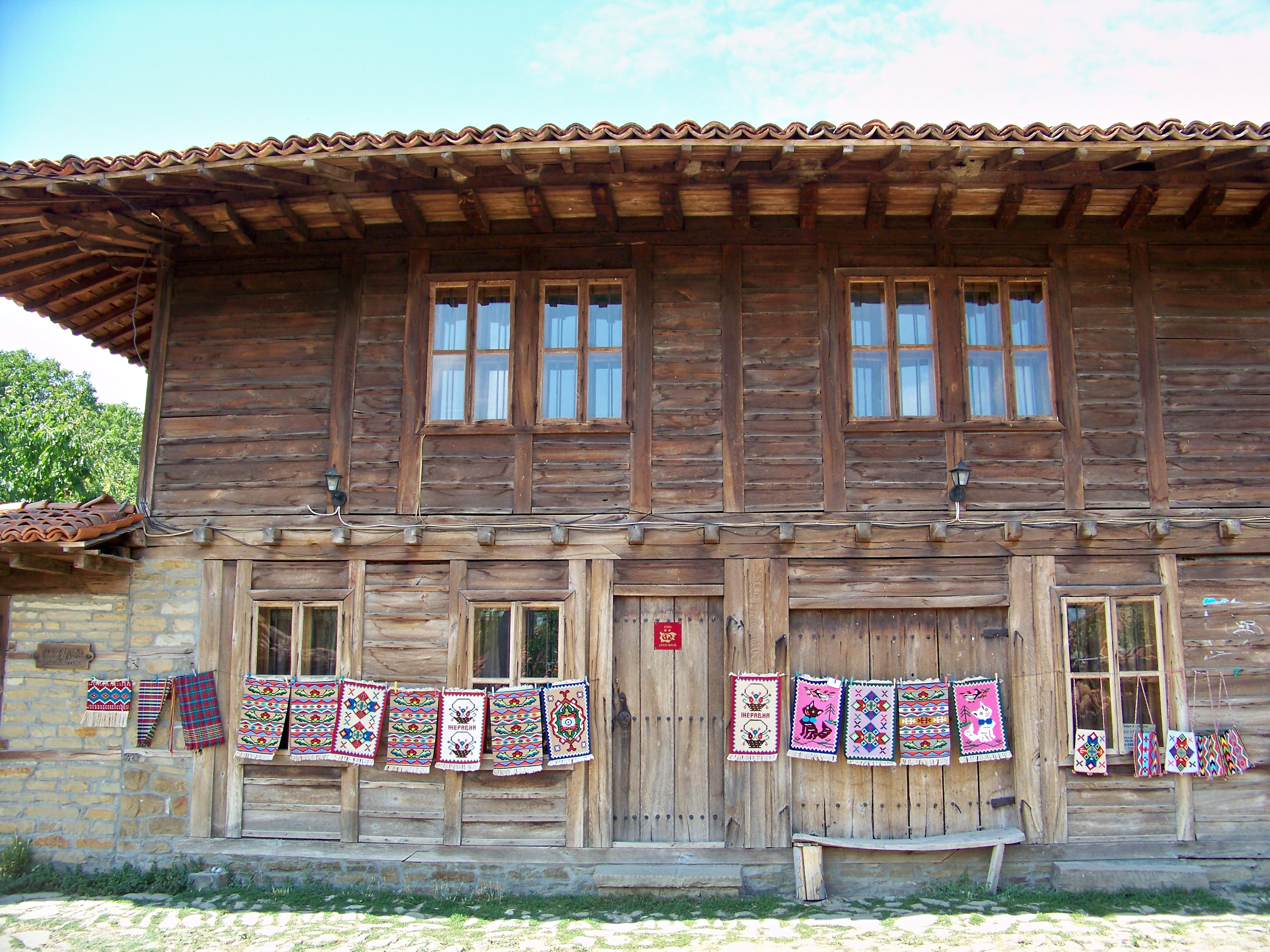

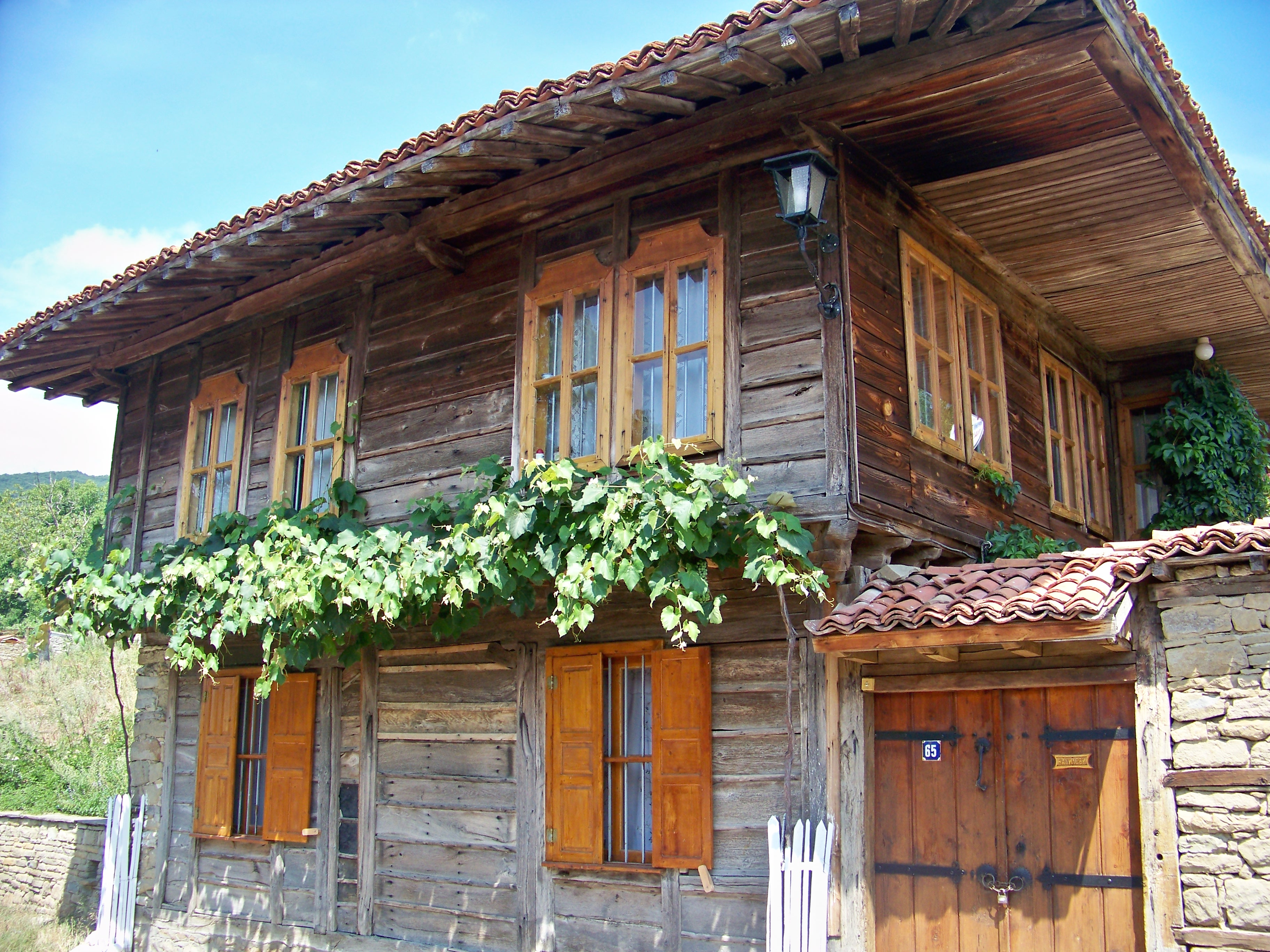

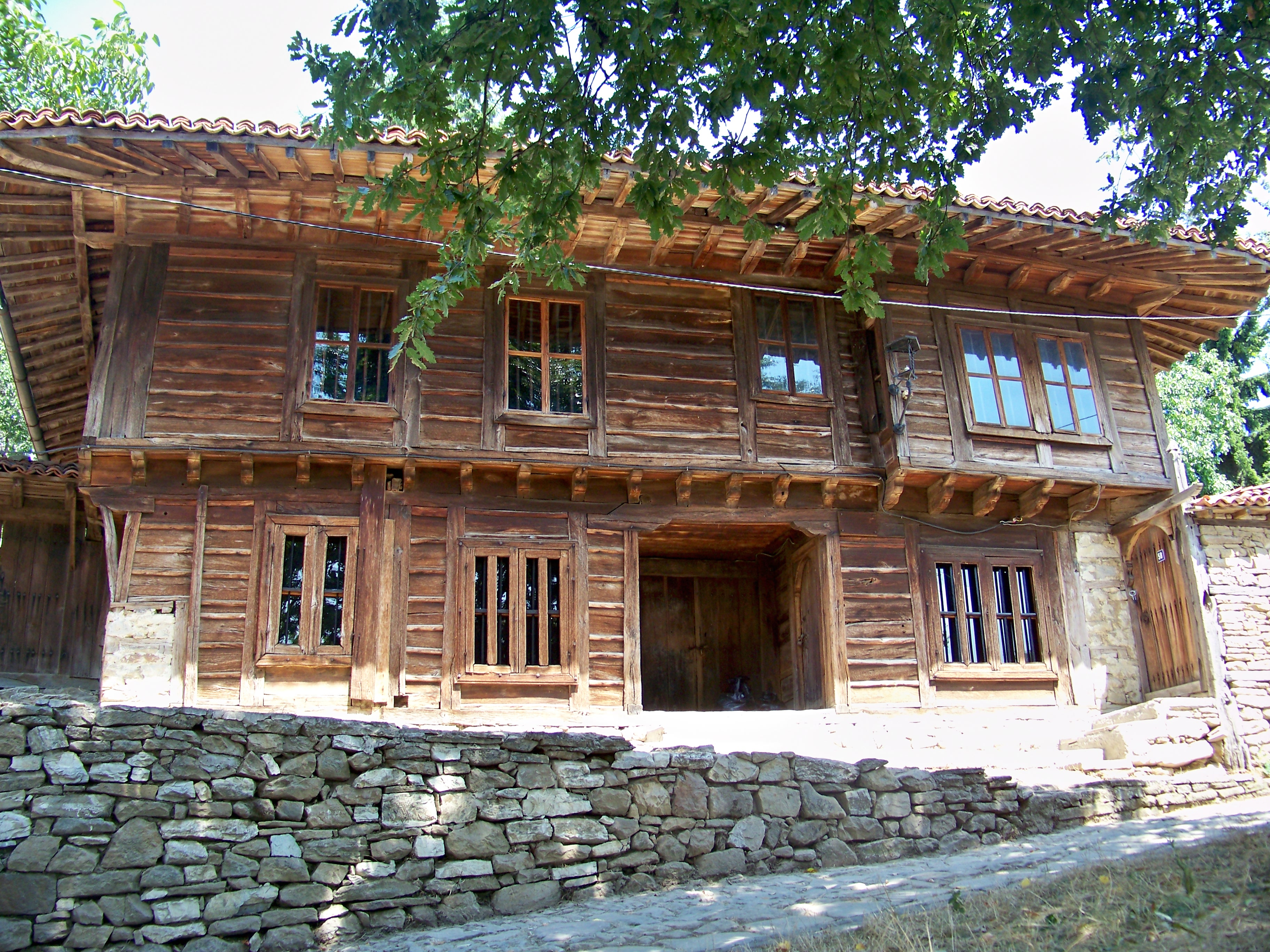

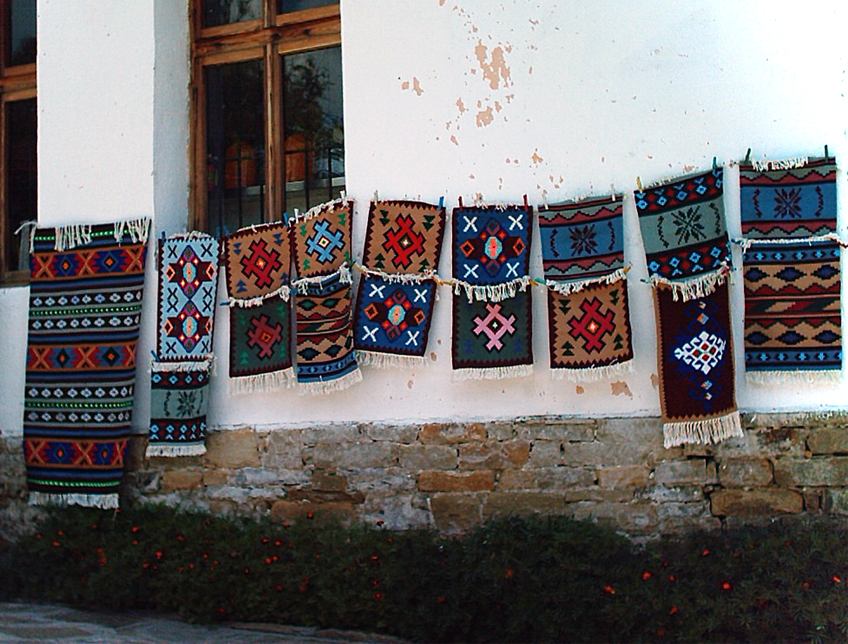
Hand made rugs from Zheravna

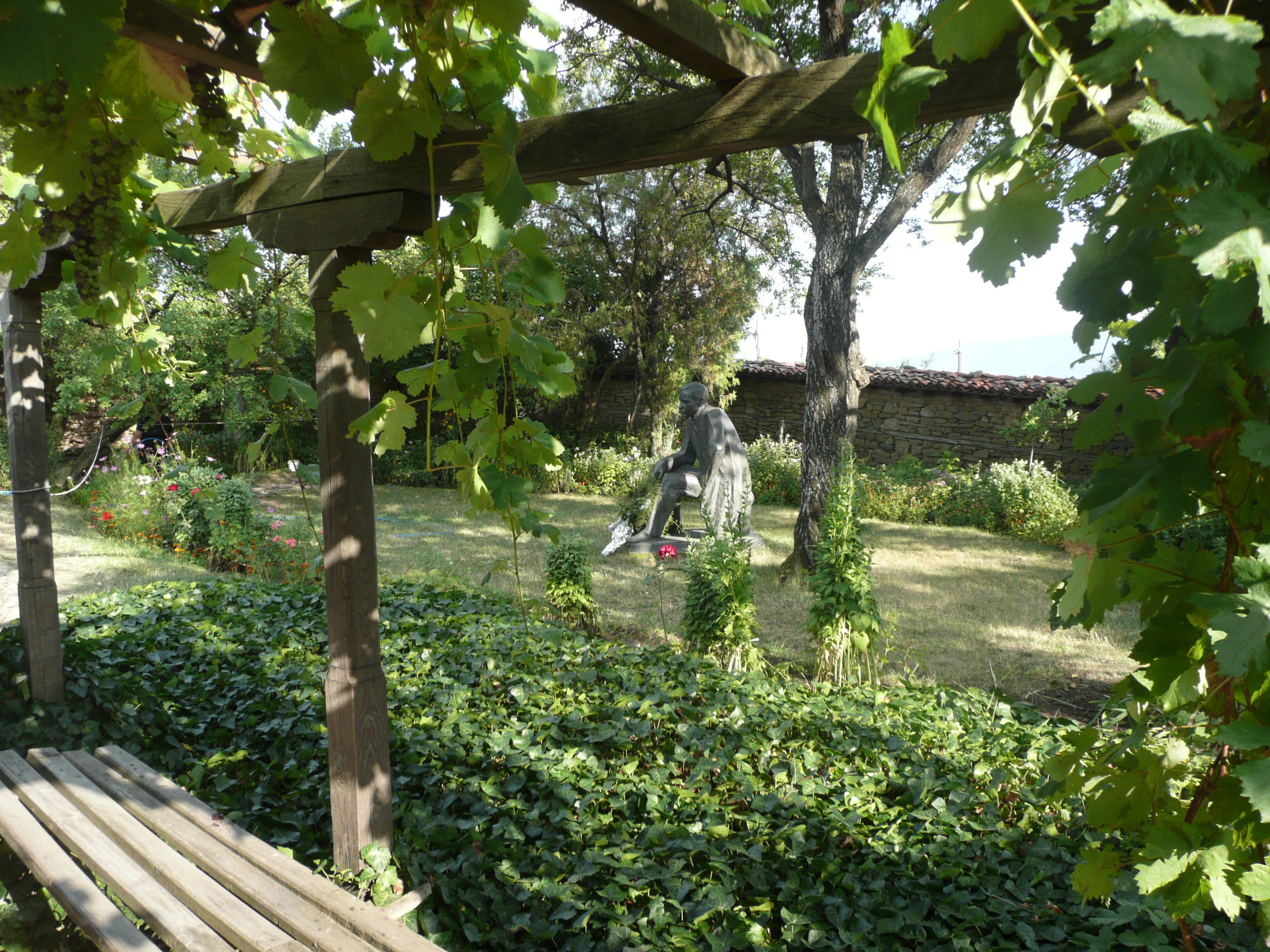
