= Yordan Yovkov =

Bulgarian writer

- Йордан Стефанов Йовков
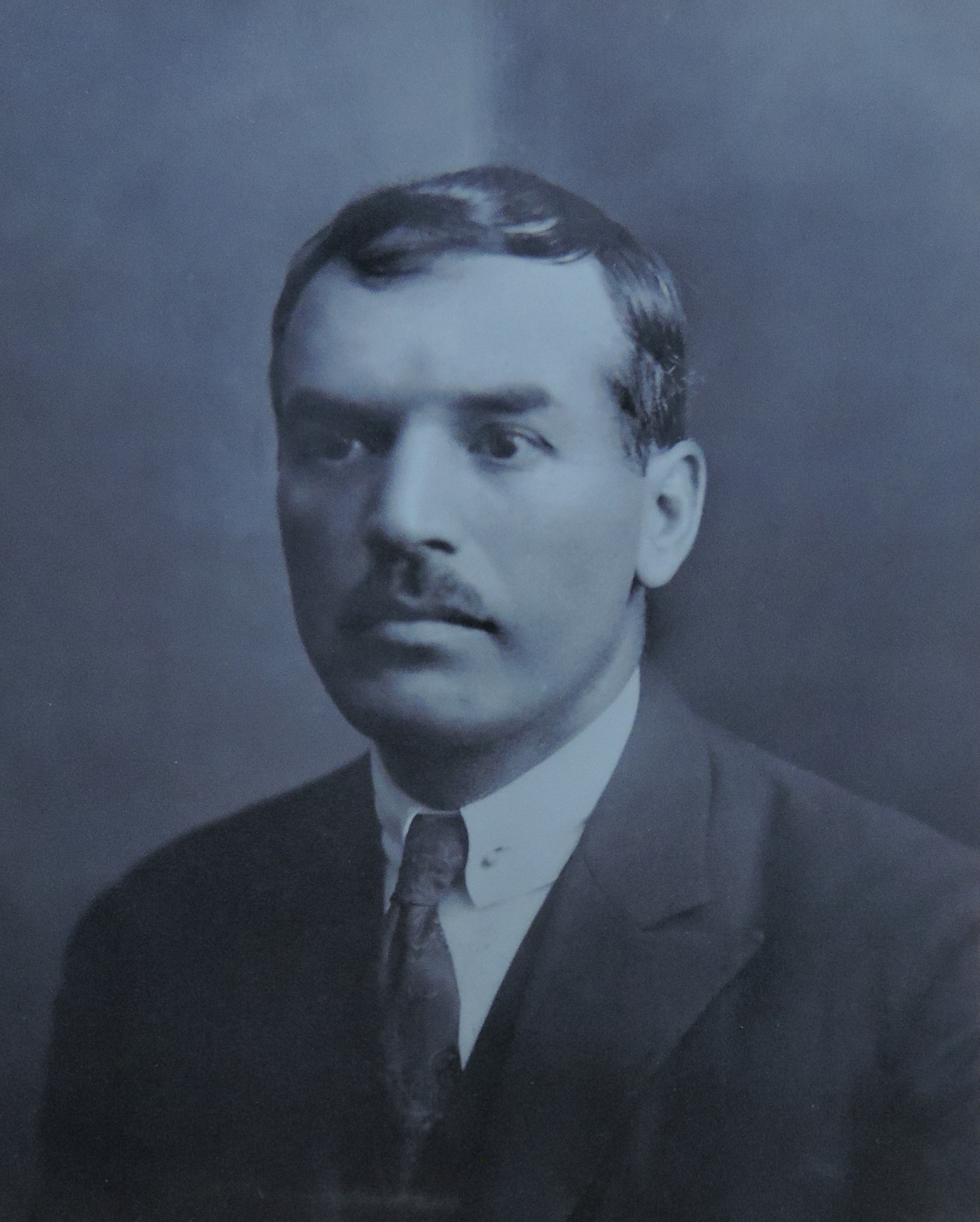
- Born: 9 November 1880; Zheravna, Eastern Roumelia
- Died: 15 October 1937 (aged 56); Plovdiv, Kingdom of Bulgaria
- Resting place: Sofia Central Cemetery; 42°42′55.3″N 23°20′06.9″E

Yordan Stefanov Yovkov (Bulgarian: Йордан Стефанов Йовков), Aka Jordan Jovkov or Iordan Iovkov (November 9, 1880 – October 15, 1937) was a prominent Bulgarian writer from the interwar period.

== Biography ==
Born in the village of Zheravna, Yovkov studied at First Sofia Men’s High School, from which he graduated in 1900 with honors, and became a teacher. After teaching for one year in a village in central Bulgaria he entered into the School for Reserve Officers in Knyazhevo as a cadet, before moving to Sofia University to study law in 1904. He never completed his studies due to the lack of funds.

When the First Balkan War began in 1912, he received the rank of enlisted, and along with his brother Kosta, joined the 41st division (probably 41st regiment) at Bourgas. He was wounded by a bullet in his leg fighting in the Second Balkan War in 1913, during a battle near Doyran. Following this, he settled in Sofia and became an editor of the People’s Army (Narodna Armiya) magazine, and then librarian for the Minister of Interior Affairs and editor of a state publication.

During World War I, he was sent to work as a border officer at the Greek border near the Mesta River. Whilst there he received a summons to work as a correspondent for the paper Military News.

He spent years teaching in Varna until the autumn of 1920, after which he served as a press secretary in the Bulgarian embassy in Bucharest. He was demoted in 1927 for unspecified reasons, which caused him to resign and return to Sofia.

== Literary work and legacy ==
Yovkov’s war experiences greatly influenced his mentality and style of writing. Whereas his first literary effort was a short story about village life and patriarchal customs, published in 1910, his post-war pieces were harsher and more militaristic. Eventually he moved away from melancholic, depressive themes towards authentic descriptions of villagers and country life. In his short story Shibil, he used turkisms to give a sense of realism to the work. His works Legends of Stara Planina (1927, Staroplaninski legendi, alternately known as the Balkan Legends) and Inn at Antimovo (1927) established him as a major writer. In 1929, he received the Cyril and Methodius Prize for Literature from the Bulgarian Academy of Science.

His other works include the dramas Albena (1930) and Boryana (1932); a comedy The Millionaire (1930, Milionerut); and a book, The Family by the Frontier (1934, Chiflikut krai granitsata). "Albena" (1962) - libretto Peter Filchev (after the drama of Yordan Yovkov) and "Millionaire" (1965) were made into operas by Parashkev Hadjiev.

A number of his stories were made into films, including Nai-vyarnata strazha (The Most Loyal Guard, film in 1929); Shibil (1968); Nona (1973, from the novel Chiflikut krai granitsata); 24 Chasa duzhd (1982, based on the novel Chastinyat uchitel); and Serafim (short movie, 2017).

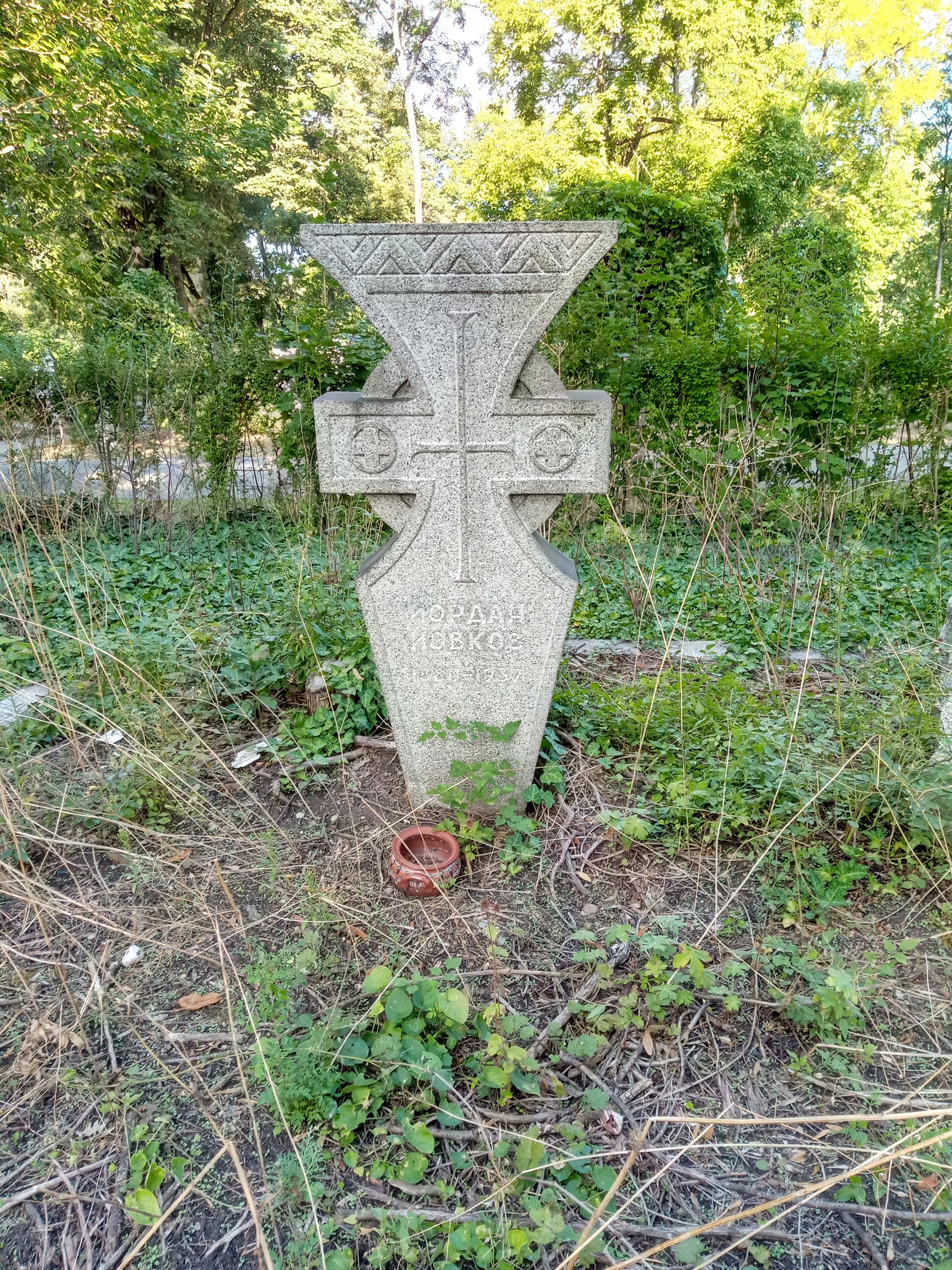
The Grave of Yordan Yovkov at Sofia Central Cemetery (42°42′55.3″N 23°20′06.9″E

== Honors ==
Yovkov’s natal home in Zheravna was turned into a museum in 1957.

In 1985, a dam in northeastern Bulgaria was named after him. Yovkovtsi Dam, situated 5 km from the town of Elena, supplies water to Veliko Turnovo and surrounding areas. It is 223,000 decares in size and is a hygienic protected zone.

A street in Sofia and Prague is named after Yordan Yovkov.

Yovkov Point on Greenwich Island, South Shetland Islands, Antarctica is named after Yordan Yovkov.

There is a bust of Yovkov in the park behind Vasil Levski National Stadium in Sofia.

The village Yovkovo in General Toshevo Municipality in Dobrich Province is named after him.

== Selected works ==
- Yovkov, Yordan (1990). The Inn at Antimovo and Legends of Stara Planina. Translated by Burnip, John. Columbus, Ohio: Slavica Publishers – via Internet Archive.
