= Sliven Province =

Province in southern Bulgaria

Coordinates: 42°41′N 26°21′E

Sliven Province Област Сливен
- Province
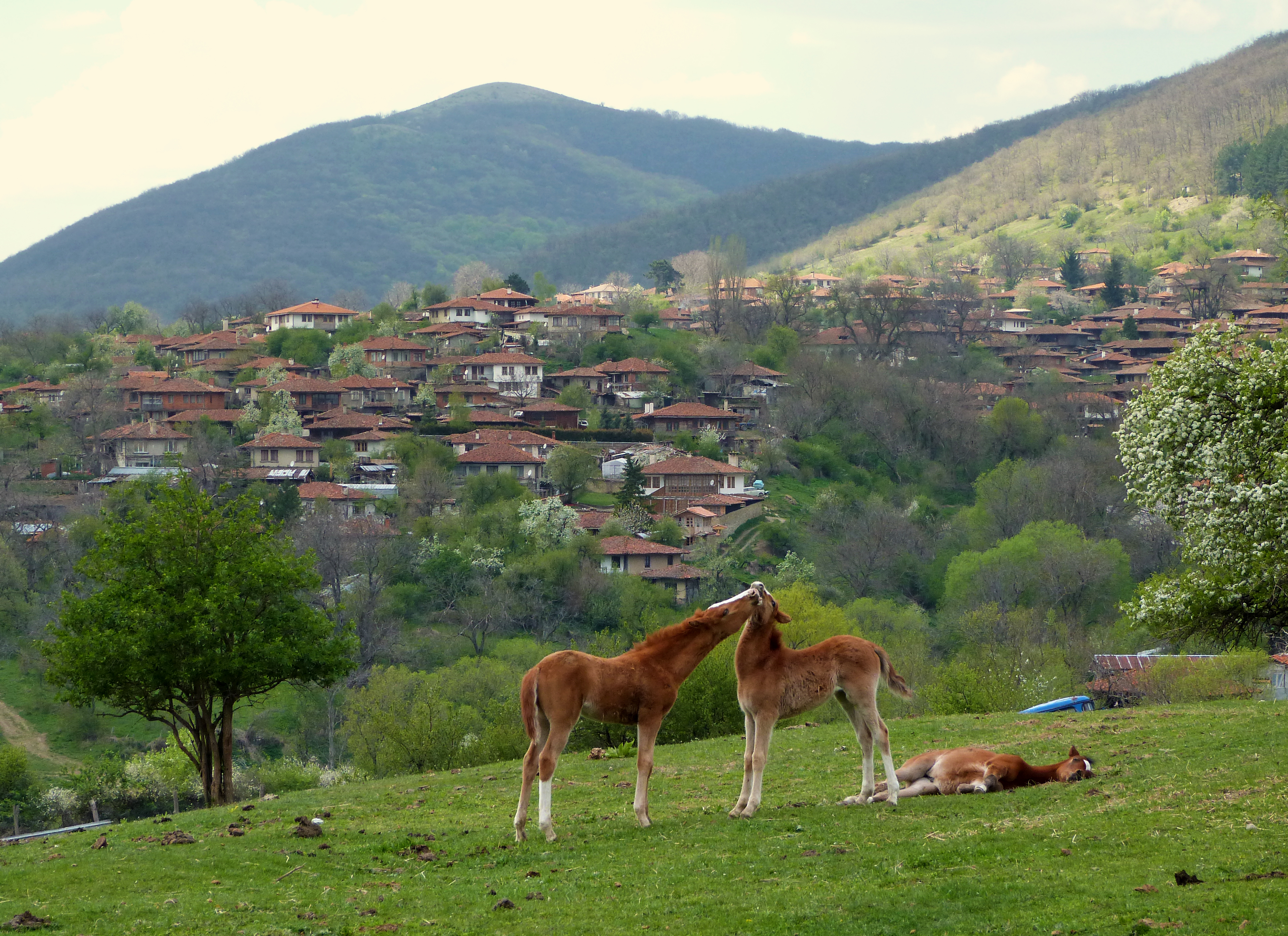
- A rural landscape in Sliven Province

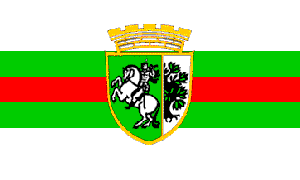
- Flag

- Location of Sliven Province in Bulgaria
- Country: Bulgaria
- Capital: Sliven
- Municipalities: 4

Government
  - Governor: Chavdar Bozhourski

Area
  - Total: 3,544.1 km^{2} (1,368.4 sq mi)

Population (December 2022)
  - Total: 170,583
  - Density: 48.132/km^{2} (124.66/sq mi)
- Time zone: UTC+2 (EET)
  - Summer (DST): UTC+3 (EEST)
- License plate: CH
- Website: regionsliven.com

Sliven Province (Bulgarian: Област Сливен, former name Sliven okrug) is a province in southeastern Bulgaria, named after its administrative and industrial centre Sliven. It has a territory of 3,544.1 km^{2} (1,368.4 sq mi) that is divided into four municipalities, with a total population, as of December 2009, of 204,887.

== Municipalities ==
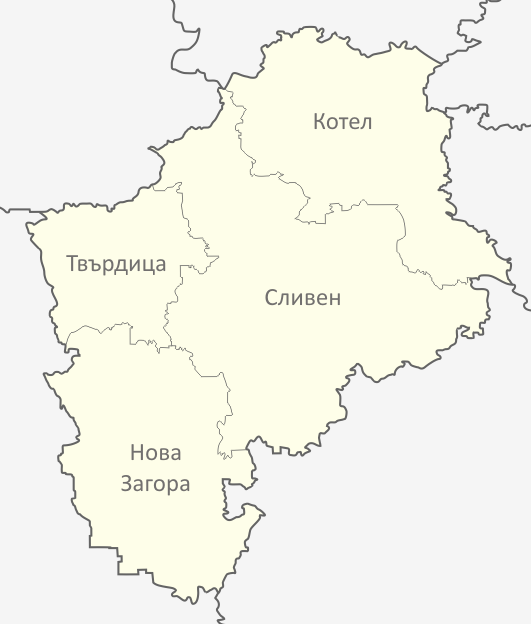
Map of Sliven Province

The Sliven province contains four municipalities. The following table shows the names of each municipality in English and Cyrillic, the main town or village (towns are shown in bold), and the population of each as of December 2009.

Municipality	Cyrillic	Pop.	Town/Village	Pop.
Kotel	Котел	20,338	**Kotel**	6,232
Nova Zagora	Нова Загора	41,959	**Nova Zagora**	23,625
Sliven	Сливен	128,249	**Sliven**	93,781
Tvarditsa	Твърдица	14,341	**Tvarditsa**	5,669

== Main city ==
Sliven is situated in the Sliven Valley at the foothills of the unique rock massif "Sinite Kamani" (The Blue Rocks) in the Balkan Mountains, very close to mineral springs. The town is famous for its clean fresh air, clean water sources, mild winters and cool summers.

Sliven is thought to be one of the oldest settlements in Europe. Thracians, Romans, Slavs, and Ancient Greeks have all lived in the region. The first Roman settlement on this place, Tuida (3rd century BC), was a famous trade centre. Sliven was mentioned as a big town for the first time in 1153 by the Arab traveler Muhammad al-Idrisi.

== Demographics ==
Historical population
Year	Pop.	±%
1946	175,053	—
1956	193,309	+10.4%
1965	219,702	+13.7%
1975	232,986	+6.0%
1985	239,448	+2.8%
1992	234,785	−1.9%
2001	218,474	−6.9%
2011	197,473	−9.6%
2021	172,690	−12.6%
Source: pop-stat.mashke.org

As of the end of 2009, the population of the province, announced by the Bulgarian National Statistical Institute, numbered 204,887 of which 22.3% are inhabitants over 60 years old.

=== Ethnic groups ===
Ethnic groups in Sliven Province (2011 census)
Ethnic group	Percentage
Bulgarians	76.6%
Romani	11.8%
Turks	9.7%
others and indefinable	1.9%

Total population (2011 census): 197 473
Ethnic groups (2011 census): Identified themselves: 173 206 persons:

- Bulgarians: 132 697 (76.61%)
- Romani: 20 478 (11.82%)
- Turks: 16 784 (9.69%)
- Others and indefinable: 3 247 (1.87%)

A further 24,000 persons in Sliven Province did not declare their ethnic group at the 2011 census.

According to the 2001 census, the province had a population of 218 474 inhabitants, of whom 163 188 were Bulgarians, 26 777 Romani, 22 971 Turks, etc.

=== Religion ===
Religious adherence in the province according to 2001 census:

Census 2001
religious adherence	population	%
Orthodox Christians	178,721	81.80%
Muslims	21,668	9.92%
Protestants	5,071	2.33%
Roman Catholics	251	0.11%
Other	1,057	0.48%
Religion not mentioned	11,706	5.36%
**total**	**218,474**	100%

== Sinite Kamani Nature Park ==
Sliven

The Sinite Kamani Nature Park is known for its nature landmarks. Halkata, the arc-shaped rock garland, is one of the symbols of the town of Sliven.

The vertebrate animals are represented by 235 species: eight species of fish, nine species of amphibians, nineteen species of reptiles, 165 species of birds and 34 species of mammals.

The lay is of typical mountain type, with steep and ravine slopes between 290 and 1181 metres above sea level. IThrough the park flow many rivers and their beds form numerous shoots, pools and waterfalls.

== See also ==
- Provinces of Bulgaria
- List of villages in Sliven Province
