= Nikolay Chervenkov =

Ukrainian and Moldovan scientist (1948–2025)

- Николай Червенков
- Born: 2 January 1948; Chiyshia, Ukrainian SSR, USSR
- Died: 1 July 2025 (aged 77)
- Education: Odessa National University
- Occupations: Philologist; Ukrainian-Moldovan historian
- Notable work: Academy of Sciences of Moldova; Taraclia State University
- Office: History, Bulgarian Studies

Nikolai Nikolaevich Chervenkov (Bulgarian: Николай Червенков; 2 January 1948 – 1 July 2025) was a Ukrainian and Moldovan historian of Bulgarian descent and a member of the Bulgarian national movement in Moldova and Ukraine.

== Life and career ==
Chervenkov was born in the village of Chiyshiya (Gorodnee, Chiyshiy), Bolhrad Raion, Odessa Oblast, Ukraine into a family of descendants of Bulgarian immigrants. He graduated from the Faculty of History of Odessa National University "Ilya Mechnikov" (1972). He received the scientific degree of Doctor of History (1982) with a dissertation on the topic "Bulgarian emigration to Romania and the national liberation movement in Bulgaria (the second half of the 1950s – 1960s of the 19th century)", and then became a Doctor of Historical Sciences (2003) with a dissertation on the topic "Formation of ideas of Bulgarian statehood (mid-18th – 1970s of the 19th century)". He had the scientific title of senior research associate. He specialized at the Institute of History of the Bulgarian Academy of Sciences and the Institute of Slavic Studies of the Russian Academy of Sciences.

From 1972 to 2004, he worked at the Academy of Sciences of Moldova, initially at the Institute of History (junior, senior research fellow, head of the Department of "History of the Countries of Southeast Europe"), and then at the Institute of Interethnic Studies (leading research fellow, head of the "Bulgarian Studies" section, deputy director of the institute). For many years, he was a full-time associate professor at the Moldovan State University and the Chișinău State Pedagogical University "I. Creanga". He was the first rector (2004–2010) of the Gregory Tsamblak State University in Taraclia, where he was elected professor.

In the fall of 1990 at a meeting with the President of Bulgaria Zhelyu Zhelev, Chervenkov discussed the issues of Bulgarians living in the USSR and their relations with Bulgaria; handed him a letter from the Department of Bulgarian Studies, in which he proposed the creation of a semi-higher institute in Gabrovo for the training of teachers for the Bessarabian and Tavrian Bulgarians, on the basis of the existing Institute for the Improvement of the Qualification of Personnel there. The idea was adopted and in 1993 an independent unit was formed at the institute — the Educational and Qualification Center for Bulgarians Abroad.

Chervenkov was Chairman of the Scientific Society of Bulgarians in the Republic of Moldova. He was elected a member of the Board of Directors of the Association of Bulgarians in the Soviet Union, of the Bulgarian Municipality in the Republic of Moldova, of the Board of Directors of the All-Bulgarian Committee "Vasil Levski", etc.

Chervenkov's scientific interests included the history of the Bulgarian national liberation movement, Bulgarian-Russian-Moldovan relations, and Bulgarian immigrants in Romania, Moldova and Ukraine.

Chervenkov was the author or co-author of more than 150 articles, studies, books and textbooks, including 13 monographs, documentary collections, textbooks and up to 200 popular science articles. He was the scientific editor of a whole series of books and collections, the scientific director of international projects and scientific conferences and the editor responsible for the almanac "Bulgarian Horizons".

Chervenkov died on 1 July 2025, at the age of 77.

== Awards ==
- Order "Gloria Muncii" for the Republic of Moldova
- Order “St. St. Cyril and Methodius” I degree (2018)

Honors:

- for the President of the Republic of Bulgaria
- "Marin Drinov" on Bulgarskata Academy on Naukite
- at Sofia University "Kliment Ohridski"
- "Recognition" at the Academy of Sciences of Moldova
- for the All-Bulgarian Committee "Vasil Levski"

== Bibliography ==
- Political organizations of the Bulgarian national liberation movement in the second. half of the 50s - 60s. XIX century Responsible Ed. V.Ya.Grosul, Kishinev, “Shtiinca”, 1982, 132 p.
- Formation of National Independent States in the Balkans. Late 18th – 1870s. Responsible ed. I. Dostyan. Moscow “Nauka”, 1986, 332 p. (Collective)
- Bulgarian-Russian Socio-Political Relations. 1850s-1870s. Responsible ed. B.N. Bilunov. Kishinev “Shtiinca”, 1986, 267 (Collective)
- International Relations in the Balkans. 1830–1856. Responsible ed. V.N. Vinogradov. Moscow “Nauka”, 1999, 326 p. (Collective)
- Vasil Levsky. Responsible ed. I. Grek. Chișinău-Chimishlia, 1993, 134 p.
- Bulgarians from Ukraine and Moldova. Past and Present. Sofia, IK "Hristo Botev", 1993. - 296 (Author - I. Grek)
- Bulgaria of the 20th Century. Responsible ed. E. Valeva. Moscow "Science", 2003. P. (Collective)
- Чийшия: essays on the history and ethnography of the Bulgarian village of Gorodneye in Bessarabia Chief ed. N. Stanko Odessa, “Asgroprint”, 2003, 788 pp. (collective)
- Besarabskite-Bulgari-za-sebe-si. Compiled by P.-E. Mitev and N. Chervenkov. Sofia, 1996, 317 pp.
- the way.pdf Along the path of the national spirituality of the Bulgarians of Moldova. Authors I. Grek, N. Chervenkov, T. Shikirliyskaya. Scientific editors I. Grek, N. Chervenkov. Chișinău, SȘB, 2005, 600 p.
- Church of Sts. Peter and Paul in the village of Chiyshia (Gorodnee). Chișinău: SȘB: Cu drag, 2013. 240 s.
- Taraclia – 200 years. Volume I (1813 – 1940). Scientific editor K. Kalchev. Chișinău, SȘB, 2013, 608 pp. (author I. Duminica)
