= Chervenkov =

Chervenkov (Bulgarian: Червенков) is a Bulgarian masculine surname, its feminine counterpart is Chervenkova. It may refer to

- Angel Chervenkov (born 1964), Bulgarian football player and manager
- Nikolay Chervenkov (1948–2025), Ukrainian and Moldovan historian of Bulgarian descent and a member of the Bulgarian national movement
- Slavcho Chervenkov (born 1955), Bulgarian wrestler
- Valko Chervenkov (1900–1980), Bulgarian politician
