= Corten, Taraclia =

Corten Кортен
- Village
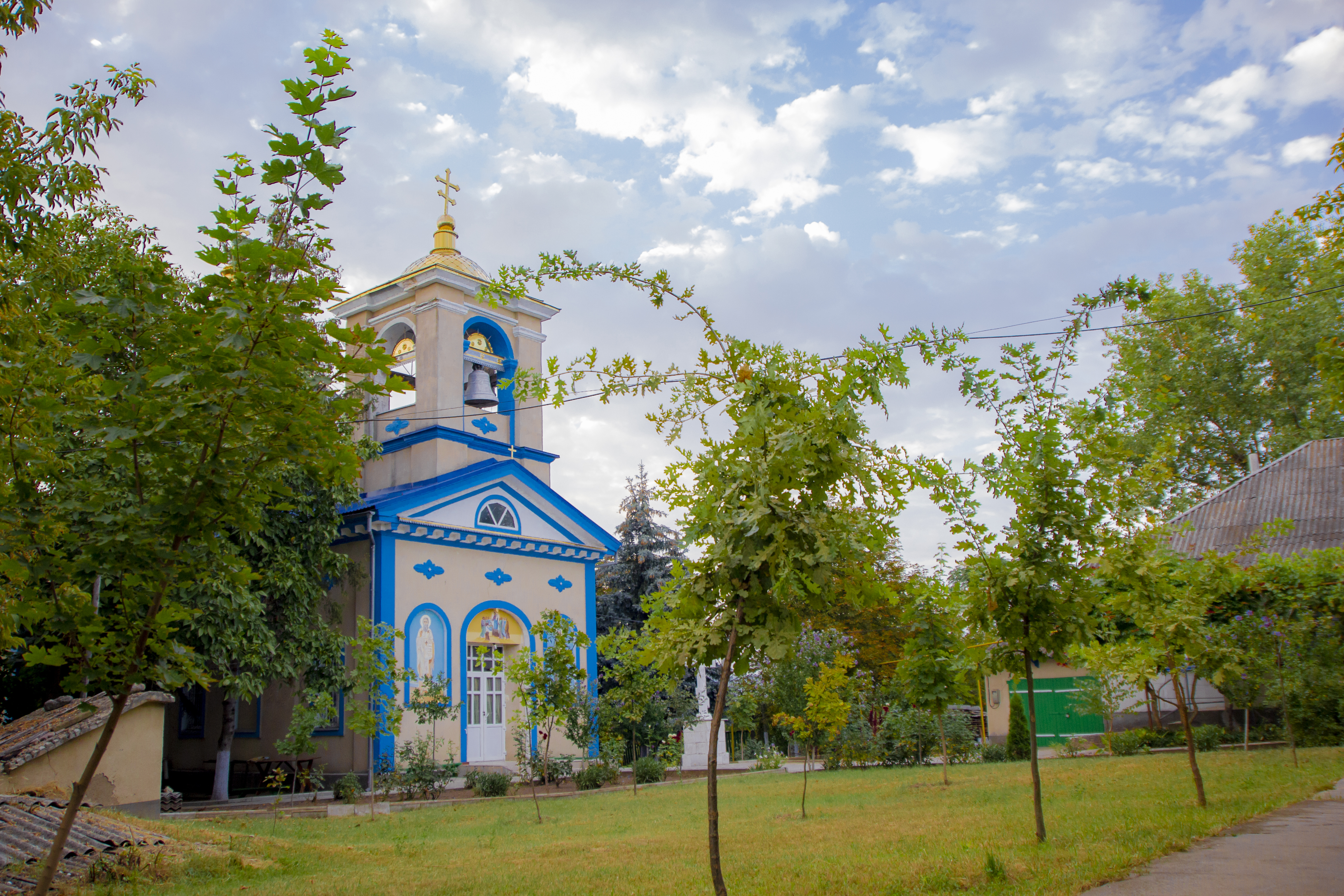
- Church of the Assumption in Corten

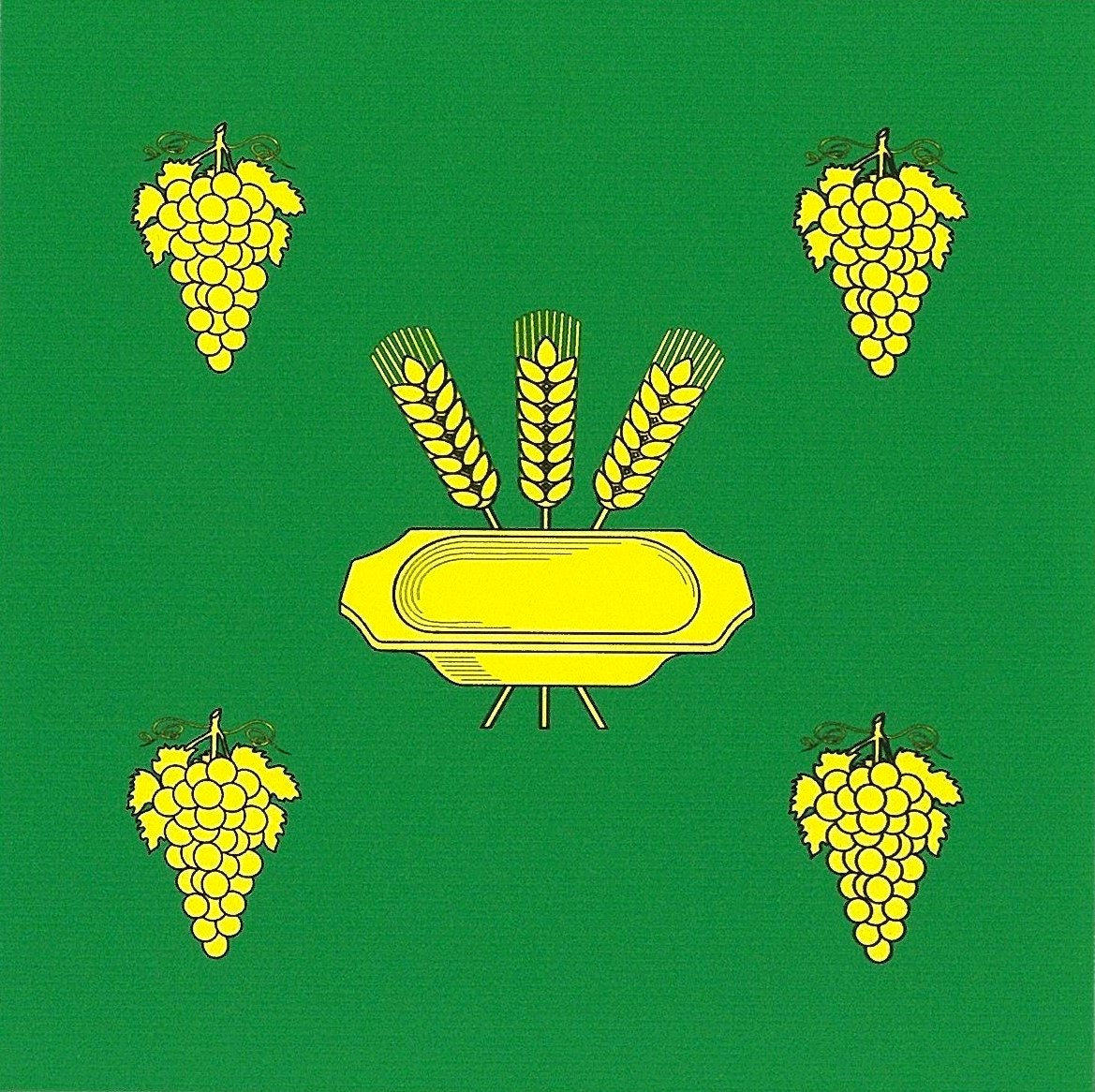
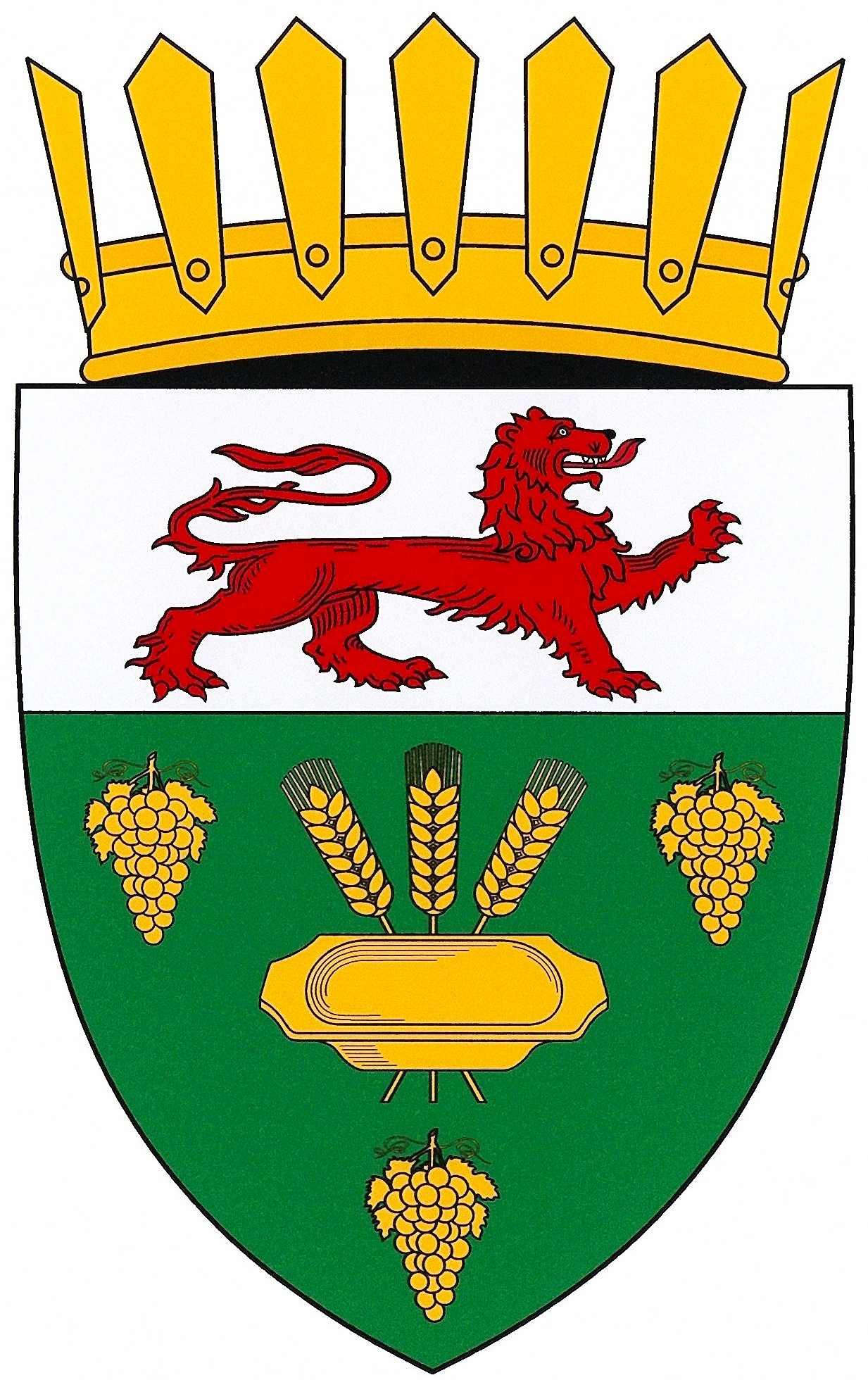
- Flag Coat of arms

- Location of Corten in Moldova
- Coordinates: 46.0166°N 28.7333°E
- Country: Moldova
- District: Taraclia District
- Founded: 1830

Government
  - Mayor: Stepan Tanurcov

Area
  - Total: 2.62 km^{2} (1.01 sq mi)

Population (2024)
  - Total: 1,833
  - Density: 700/km^{2} (1,810/sq mi)

Ethnicity (2024 census)
  - Bulgarians: 82.3%
  - Gagauz people: 6.9%
  - other: 10.8%
- Time zone: UTC+2 (EET)
  - Summer (DST): UTC+3 (EEST)
- Climate: Cfb

Corten (Bulgarian: Кортен), also Kiryutnya (Кирютня; 1830–1990), is a village in Taraclia District, Moldova. According to the 2024 Moldovan census the village has 1,833 people, 1,508 (82.3%) of them being Bulgarians, 127 (6.9%) Gagauz people and 75 (4.1%) Moldovans. The inhabitants of the village speak an archaic variety of the Bulgarian Subbalkan dialect, of the Sliven area.

== History ==
The village of Corten was founded in 1830 by Bulgarian refugees from the village of Korten in Rumelia, Ottoman Empire following the Russo-Turkish War (1828–1829). The name of the village was officially recorded in documents as Kiryutnya (Russian: Кирютня), while the locals referred to the village as Corten. According to the Russian Imperial documents, in 1835 around 654 people lived in the village.

In 1946, two collective farms were formed in the village, named "Stalin" and "Lenin", which in 1951 merged into a single collective farm called "Lenin's Way."

Following the Independence of Moldova, the village was officially renamed to Corten and a Bulgarian kindergarten was opened in the village alongside switching to Bulgarian in schools, before this education was exclusively in either Romanian, Russian or Ukrainian.

== See also ==
- Korten, Bulgaria
