= Banya, Sliven Province =

Banya Баня
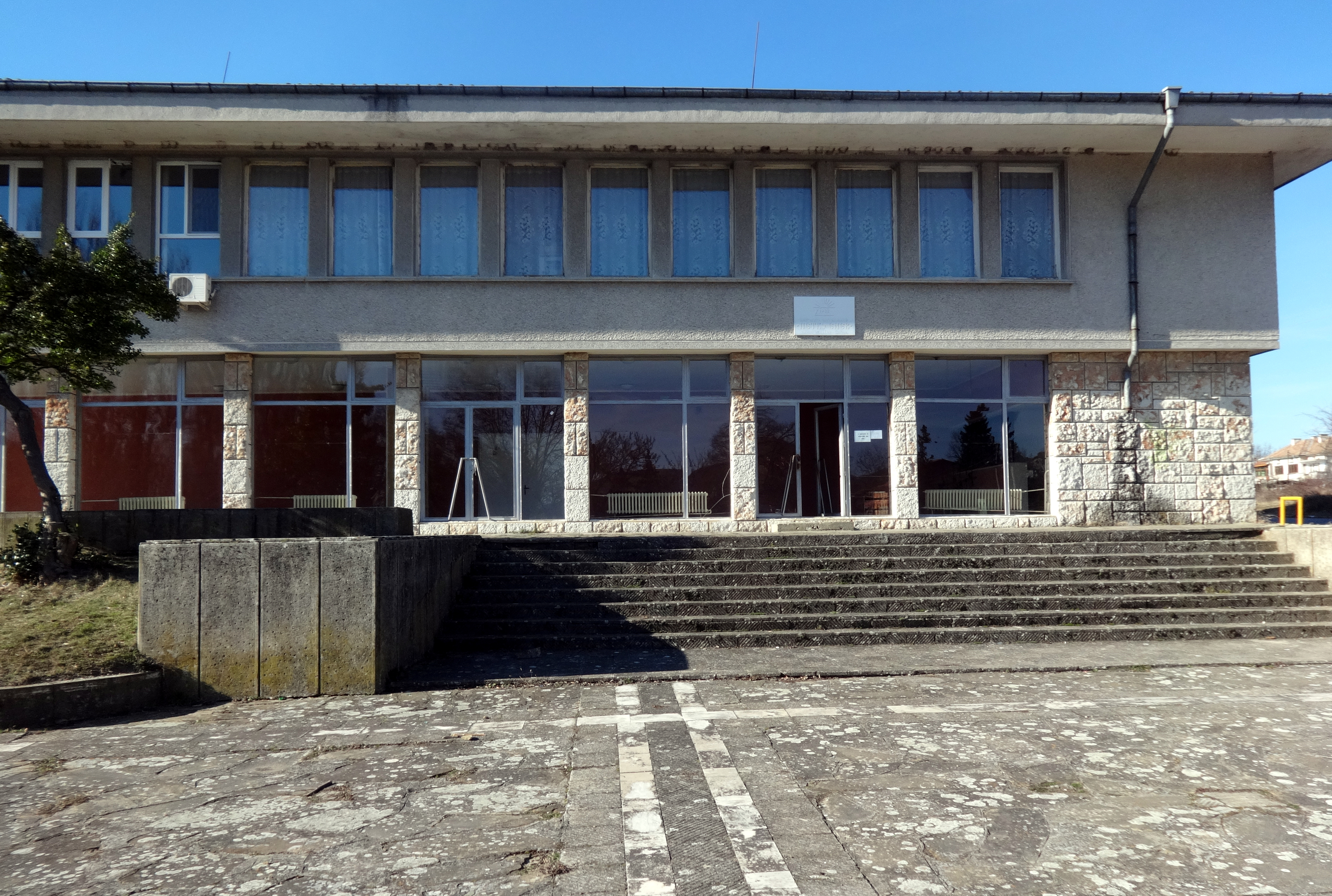

- Location of Banya, Bulgaria
- Coordinates: 42°36′22.18″N 25°59′25.68″E
- Country: Bulgaria
- Provinces (Oblast): Sliven Province

Government
  - Mayor: Dinko Ivanov
- Elevation: 231 m (758 ft)

Population (15.09.2022)
  - Total: 1,798
- Time zone: UTC+2 (EET)
  - Summer (DST): UTC+3 (EEST)
- Postal Code: 8914
- Area codes: 04567 from Bulgaria, 003594567 from outside

Banya (Bulgarian: Баня) is a village in central Bulgaria. It has a population of 1,798 as of 2022. It is also known as Novozagorski Mineralni Bani or Kortenski Mineralni Bani, meaning Nova Zagora or Korten Mineral Baths.

== Geography ==
Banya is located in Sliven Province and has a territory of 43.517 km^{2}. It is part of Nova Zagora Municipality. It is situated 13 km north of the municipal center Nova Zagora, 36 km south-southwest of the city of Sliven and 36 km northeast of the city of Stara Zagora. The village lies just south of the first class I-6 road Gyueshevo–Sofia–Karlovo–Burgas and has direct road connection with the villages of Orizari and Sborishte to the north, Chervenakovo to the east and Korten to the south.

Banya is situated in the Mezhdenik ridge just north of the Sredna Gora mountain range, facing the Tvarditsa Valley. The village is on the left bank of the river Tundzha some 2 km downstream of the Zhrebchevo Reservoir. Its altitude at the village hall is 217 m, which increases to 260–270 m in its northern neighbourhoods.

== Mineral springs ==
The mineral waters near the village of Banya are captured in the alluvial sediments along the right bank of the river Tundzha. Their temperature is 42 °С – 57 °С, with a discharge of about 8 L/sec. The water is with mineralization of 0.94 °g/L, with high content of fluorine — up to 16 °mg/L, and silicon dioxide. They are used for the prevention and treatment of diseases of the musculoskeletal system, the peripheral nervous system and gynecological diseases.

== Demographics ==
In 2011, 60% of the village's population was Bulgarian, 20.9% was Turkish, and the remaining 19.1% belonging to other ethnic groups or choosing not to answer.
