= Bessarabian Bulgarians =

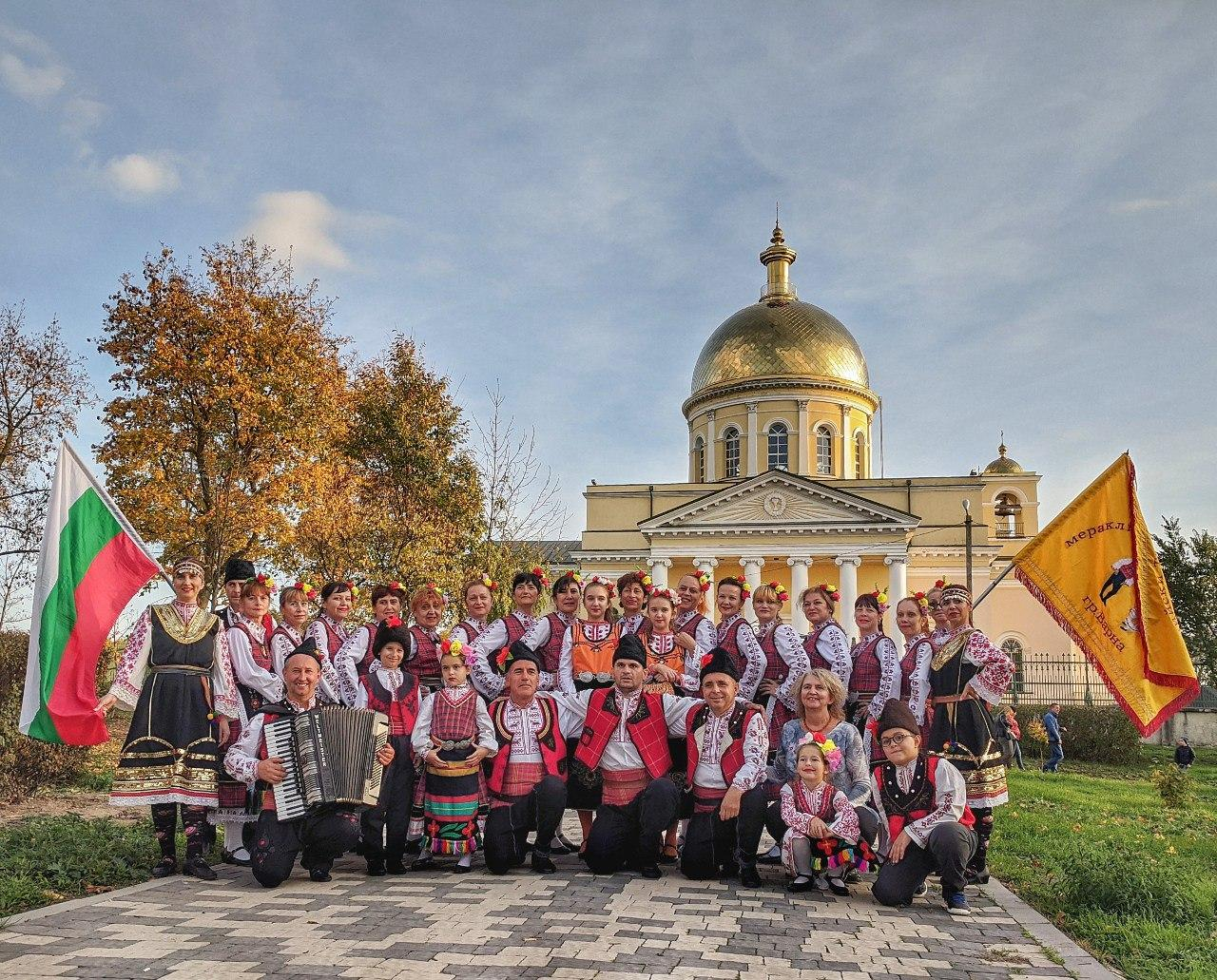
- Bulgarians at a wine festival in Bolhrad, November 2019

Regions with significant populations
- Ukraine: 204,600; Moldova: 88,400

Languages
- Bulgarian (Subbalkan dialect); Ukrainian; Russian

Religion
- Predominantly † Eastern Orthodox Christianity (Bulgarian Orthodox Church)

The Bessarabian Bulgarians (Bulgarian: бесарабски българи, romanized: besarabski bǎlgari; Romanian: bulgari basarabeni; Ukrainian: бесарабські болгари, romanized: bessarabski bolháry) are a Bulgarian minority group of the historical region of Bessarabia, inhabiting parts of present-day Ukraine (Budjak region of the Odesa Oblast) and Moldova.

== Location and number ==
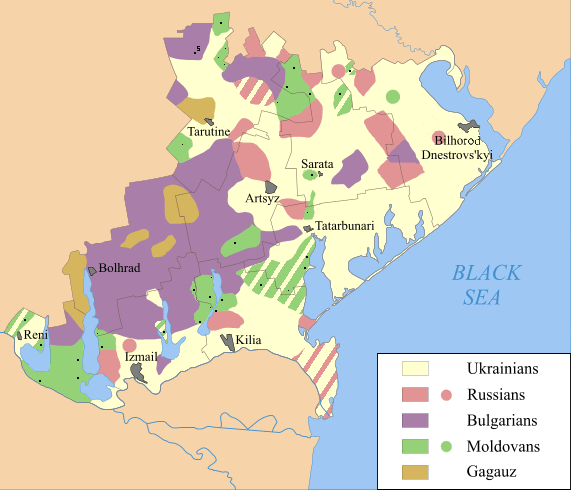
Bulgarian-inhabited areas in Budjak (purple)

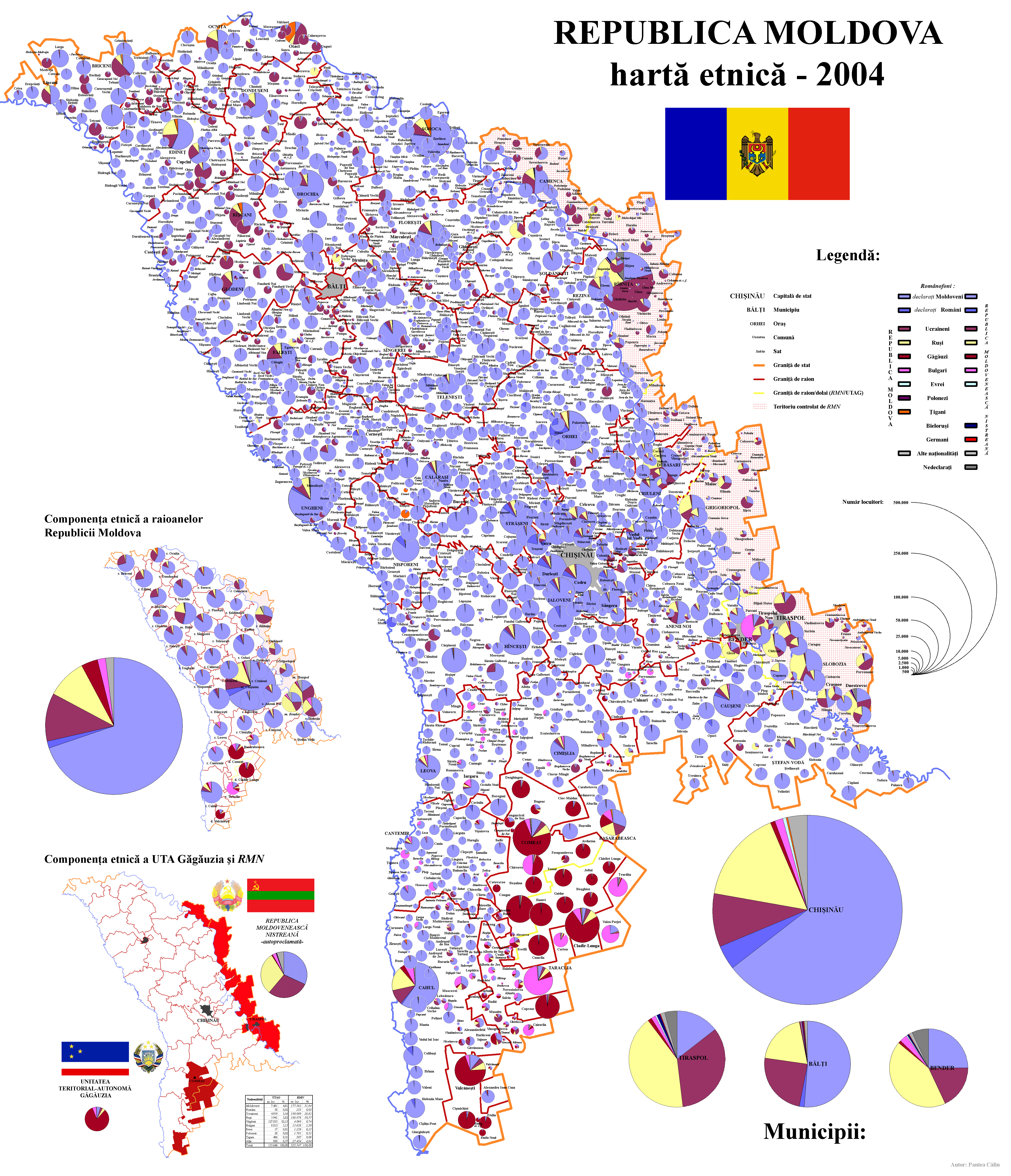
Bulgarian-inhabited areas in Moldova (pink)

=== Modern Ukraine ===
In Ukraine, the number of Bessarabian Bulgarians is estimated at over 129,000 in Budjak (in the Odesa Oblast in the southern part of the country), and 75,000 elsewhere (mostly in other parts of Southern Ukraine), according to the 2001 Ukrainian Census, which counted a total of 204,600 Bulgarians in Ukraine.

Bulgarians are a majority in Bolhrad District (45,600 of its 75,000 inhabitants), but they also inhabit other districts of Budjak: Artsyz – 20,200 of the 51,700, Bessarabske – 17,000 of the 45,200, Izmail – 14,100 of the 54,700, and Sarata – 10,000 of the 49,900. There are also 8,600 Bulgarians in the city of Izmail (85,100 total population).

Outside Budjak, Odesa has many Bulgarians that have moved there in recent years. The city of Bilhorod-Dnistrovsky is about 4% Bulgarian, making them the third-largest ethnicity there.

=== Modern Moldova ===
According to the results of the census held in October 2004, there are 65,072 Bessarabian Bulgarians (1.95% of the population) in Moldova (excluding the region of Transnistria), concentrated mostly in the southern parts — chiefly in Taraclia district. In the census held in November 2004 in Transnistria, 3,164 (3.16%) Bulgarians have been counted in Tighina and surroundings and further 10,515 (2.39%) on the Eastern bank of the river Dnestr.

29,447 Bulgarians live in the cities (and represent 2.26% of the urban dwellers), and 36,215 live in the countryside (1.74% of the rural inhabitants). 90.60% of ethnic Bulgarians were born in Moldova (the national average is 94.6%), 5,968 (9.09%) in other countries that were once in the Soviet Union (the national average is 5.16%), and 199 (0.30%) were born elsewhere.

In Moldova (and likely Ukraine too, although statistics are not available here), the Bulgarians tend to use their native Bulgarian in rural areas, and Russian (instead of the majority language Romanian) in cities and towns. 53,178 or 80.99% of ethnic Bulgarians declared Bulgarian language as native (69.23% in urban areas, and 90.55% in rural ones), 2,766 or 4.21% of them declared Romanian language as native (4.91% in urban areas, and 3.64% in rural ones), 9,134 or 13.91% of them declared Russian language as native (25.08% in urban areas, and 4.83% in rural ones), and 584 or 0.89% of them declared another language as native (0.78% in urban areas, and 0.98% in rural ones).

35,808 or 54.53% of ethnic Bulgarians declared Bulgarian language as first language in daily use (36.81% in urban areas, and 68.95% in rural ones), 5,698 or 8.68% of them declared Moldovan language/Romanian language as first (7.93% in urban areas, and 9.29% in rural ones), 23,259 or 35.42% of them declared Russian language as first (54.45% in urban areas, and 19.95% in rural ones), and 897 or 1.37% of them declared another first language (0.81% in urban areas, and 1.81% in rural ones).

Bessarabian Bulgarians represent 28,293, or 65.56% of the population of the Taraclia district. There are also Bulgarians in Chişinău (8,868, or 1.2%), Găgăuzia (8,013, or 5.1%), Cahul district (5,816, or 4.9%), Leova district (3,804, or 7.4%), and Cantemir district (3,736, or 6.2%). The share of ethnic Bulgarians in Transnistria is 10,515 (2.39%), of which 2,450 (1.55%) in Tiraspol, and 7,323 (8.44%) in Slobozia sub-district (which contains the village of Parcani). There are also 3,001 (3.09%) Bulgarians in the city of Tighina, and 342 in 3 suburbs. In total, there are 79,520 (2.02%) Bulgarians in Moldova, including Transnistria.

Bessarabian Bulgarians represent a majority in one city of Moldova, Taraclia (10,732 Bulgarians, or 78%) and in 8 communes in the country:

- Tvardița (Tvarditsa, Tvarditca), Taraclia district (5,396 of 5,882 inhabitants, 91.7%)
- Corten, Taraclia district (3,036 of 3,407 inhabitants, 87.5%)
- Colibabovca, Leova district (934 of 1,142 inhabitants, 81.8%)
- Cairaclia, Taraclia district (1,733 of 2,124 inhabitants, 81.6%)
- Stoianovca, Cantemir district (1,055 of 1,372 inhabitants, 76.9%)
- Valea Perjei, Taraclia district (3,792 of 4,986 inhabitants, 76%)
- Vozneseni, Leova district (985 of 1,396 inhabitants, 70.5%)
- Parcani, Transnistria territorial unit, 6,648 ethnic Bulgarians out of 10,543 inhabitants (63.05%)

== History ==
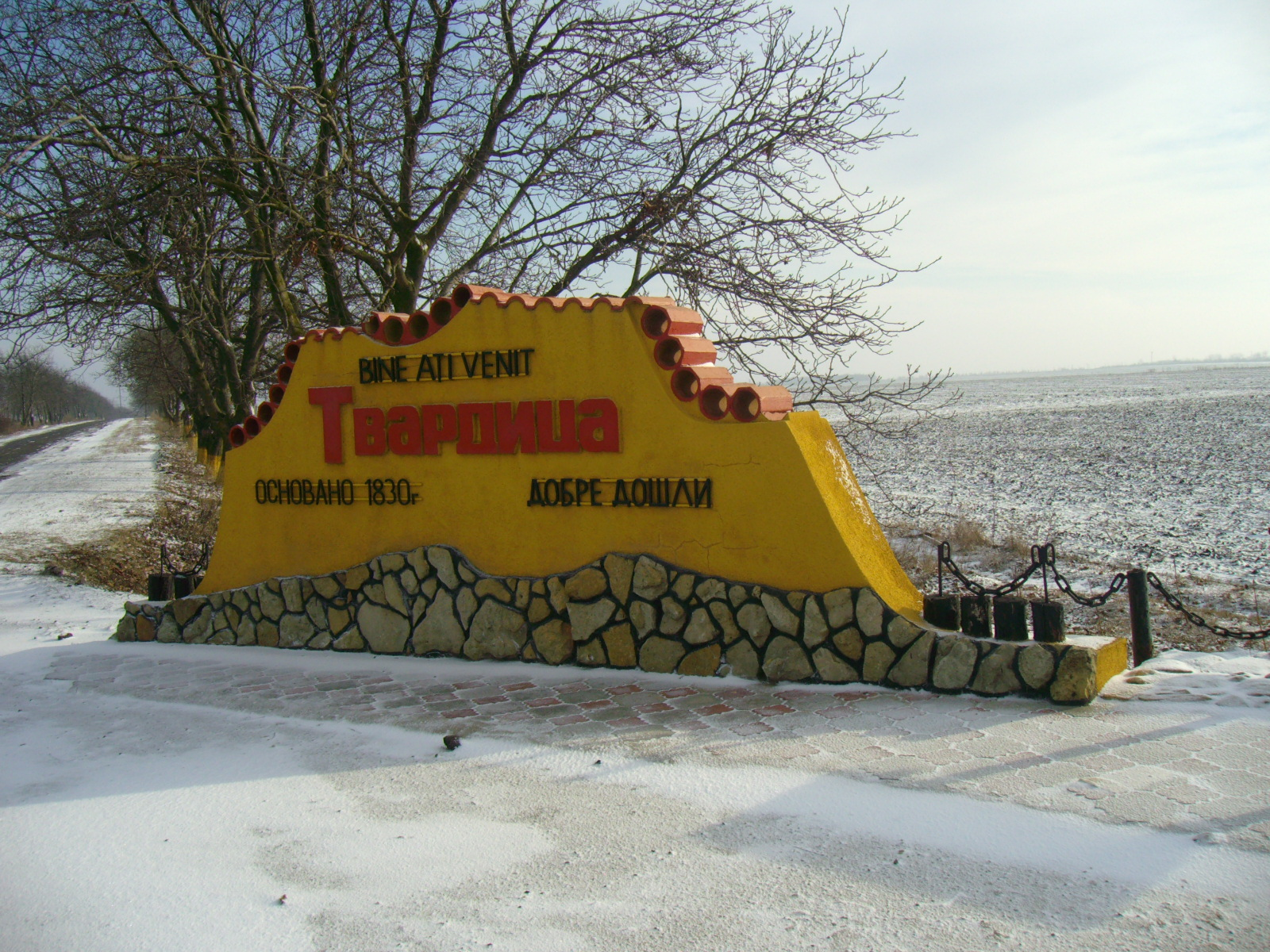
The welcome sign of Tvardița, Moldova, written mostly in Bulgarian

The first Bulgarians settled in southern Bessarabia at the end of the 18th and beginning of the 19th centuries, at the time of feudal sedition in the Ottoman Empire, and after the Russo-Turkish Wars of the period. Particularly strong waves of emigration emerged after the Russo-Turkish Wars of 1806–1812 and 1828-1829. The settlers came primarily from what is now Thrace - Glavan village, Stara Zagora Bulgaria, but many were also descendants from the western areas of the Bulgarian homelands (as far west as modern-day Albania) but had moved east in and before the 18th century. Alongside the Bulgarians who immigrated to Bessarabia were also a handful of Albanians who also had settled in eastern Bulgaria some time before.

When Russian Armies were reaching and crossing the Danube during the Russian-Ottoman Wars, some local Bulgarians supported them. These people were compromised in the eyes of the Ottomans and therefore had a better chance moving to the Russian Empire. Russian propaganda also worked to convince Bulgarians to settle in areas recently conquered by them, from which Tatars were removed. Bulgarians settled not only in Bessarabia, but also in the Kherson region.

For the first time, Bulgarian and Gagauzian refugees in Bessarabia are mentioned in 1769. The 1817 census found Bulgarians in 12 Bessarabian villages in the valleys of the Ialpug and Lunga Rivers (Creeks): 482 Bulgarian and Gagauzian families and 38 Romanian families in these 12 villages. The leader of the Bulgarians and Gagauzians was a man referred to as Copceac. Seven of the 12 villages were Gagauzian (Baurci, Beșalma, Ceadîr-Lunga, Chessău, Dezghingea, Gaidar, and Tomai), and 5 were Bulgarian.

After arriving in Bessarabia, Bulgarians and Gagauzians founded their own towns, such as Bolhrad (1819) and Comrat, and around 64 (according to some sources) or 43 (according to other sources) villages. In 1856, after the Treaty of Paris, three counties of southern Bessarabia, Cahul, Bolgrad and Ismail, reverted to the Principality of Moldavia (the United Principalities after 1859). These included the cities of Bolgrad, Ismail and Chilia. Gaguzian settlements centred on Comrat, however, remained in the Russian Empire. A Bulgarian high school (gymnasium), the Bolhrad High School, was founded in Bolgrad (Bolhrad) on June 28, 1858 by the Moldavian authorities of Alexandru Ioan Cuza, which had a positive effect on the development of Bulgarian education and culture, and is in fact the first modern Bulgarian gymnasium.

In 1861, 20,000 Bulgarians from the Romanian part of Bessarabia moved to Russia, where they were given land in Taurida Governorate to replace the Nogais who had left what was formerly territory of the Crimean Khanate. Those settlers founded another Bulgarian community—the Tauridan Bulgarians.

After the whole region of southern Bessarabia was incorporated again by the Russian Empire in 1878, the process of Russification grew stronger, as many Bulgarian intellectuals returned to newly established Principality of Bulgaria to help set up the Bulgarian state. The Bulgarian minority was deprived of the rights earned during the Romanian control.

The whole of Bessarabia united with Romania in April 1918, after the Russian Revolution and the collapse of the Russian Empire. In contrast with the previous period of Romanian control, most cultural and educational rights of the Bulgarian minority were not returned, as many Bulgarians underwent Romanianization policies.

During the Tatarbunary Uprising of 1924, when Soviets unsuccessfully tried to overthrow the Romanian administration in southern Bessarabia, many Bulgarians (alongside local Moldovans (Romanians), and Bessarabian Germans) sided with Romanian authorities, as pointed out by Gheorghe Tătărescu in the report given on behalf of the Ministry of the Interior to the Romanian Parliament in 1925.

The Molotov–Ribbentrop Pact of 1939 led to a Soviet ultimatum in June 1940, the invasion of Soviet forces into Bessarabia, and its inclusion into the Soviet Union. Although being an officially accepted minority under Soviet rule, the Bessarabian Bulgarians lost some features of their cultural identity in the period.

A movement of national revival originated in the 1980s, with Bulgarian newspapers being published, cultural and educational associations being established, and Bulgarian being introduced into the local schools especially after the dissolution of the Soviet Union: first only as an optional, but later as a compulsory subject. The Association of Bulgarians in Ukraine was founded in 1993, and Taraclia State University, co-funded by the Bulgarian state, was established in the largely Bulgarian-populated Moldovan town of Taraclia in 2004. The languages of education at the university are Bulgarian and Romanian.

== Notable Bessarabian Bulgarians ==
- Dimitar Agura, historian
- Ilie Cătărău (disputed origin), spy, fugitive and adventurer
- Vladimir Cavarnali (mixed Bulgarian–Gagauz), poet, editor and political figure
- Petar Draganov, philologist
- Dimitar Grekov, politician and public figure, Prime Minister of Bulgaria
- Anastasiya Kisse, rhythmic gymnast
- Ivan Kolev, general
- Kirill Kovaldzhi (on father's side), Russian poet and translator
- Iurie Leancă (on mother's side), diplomat and Prime Minister of Moldova
- Aleksandar Malinov, politician and public figure, three times Prime Minister of Bulgaria
- Ruslan Maynov, actor and musician
- Dmitrii Milev, writer and communist politician
- Dimitar Mutev, writer and meteorologist
- Culai Neniu, folklorist, dramatist and schoolteacher
- Danail Nikolaev, military figure, known as "The Patriarch of the Bulgarian army"
- Anton Novakov (mixed Bulgarian–Gagauz), politician, banker and industrialist
- Olimpi Panov, military figure
- Nikolay Paslar, freestyle wrestler
- Ivan Shishman, painter
- Vasile Tarlev, economist and Prime Minister of Moldova
- Aleksandar Teodorov-Balan, linguist, first rector of Sofia University
- Georgi Todorov, military figure
- Arkadiy Tsopa, freestyle wrestler
- Yona Tukuser, painter
