= Asenovets =

Asenovets Асеновец
- Location of Asenovets, Bulgaria
- Coordinates: 42°31′40.24″N 25°57′6.66″E
- Country: Bulgaria
- Provinces (Oblast): Sliven Province

Government
  - Mayor: Dimitrina Stefanova
- Elevation: 179 m (587 ft)

Population (15.03.2024)
  - Total: 650
- Time zone: UTC+2 (EET)
  - Summer (DST): UTC+3 (EEST)
- Postal Code: 8933
- Area codes: 04522 from Bulgaria, 003594522 from outside

Asenovets (Bulgarian: Асеновец) is a village in central Bulgaria. It has a population of 650 as of 2024.

== Geography ==
Asenovets is located in Sliven Province and has a territory of 20.624 km^{2}. It is part of Nova Zagora Municipality. It is situated 35 km southwest of Sliven, 6 km northwest of the municipal center Nova Zagora and 29 km northeast of the city of Stara Zagora. The village lies on the second class II-55 road that connects Veliko Tarnovo in the north and Svilengrad on the border with Turkey and Greece to the south.

Asenovets is situated in the Upper Thracian Plain, at the southern foothills of the easternmost low parts of the Sredna Gora mountain range. The terrain is evenly sloping to the south and the altitude at the village center is 168 m. The climate is temperate continental.

== Culture ==
The village school was established in 1868 and closed down in 2008. The Church of Saints Cyril and Methodius was constructed in 1887. The local chitalishte "Desko Krastev–1902" was established in 1902.

== Economy ==
Asenovets lies in a fertile agricultural area. The most important crops include grain, grapes, industrial crops and orchards. Livestock breeding is also developed.
