= Nova Zagora Municipality =

- Municipality
- Coat of arms

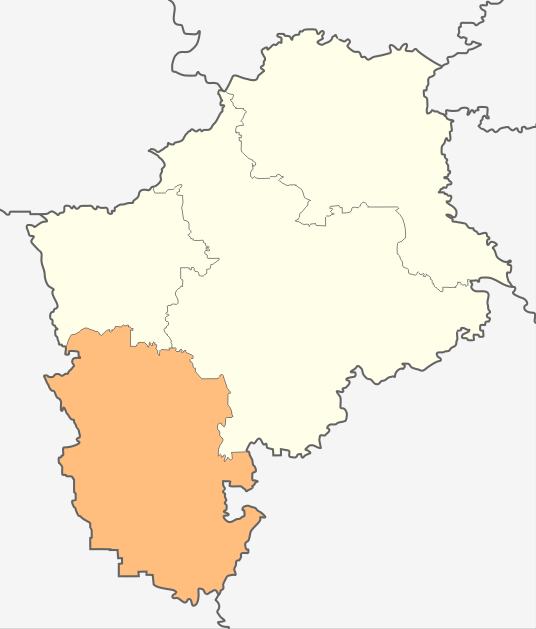
- Location of Nova Zagora Municipality in Sliven Province

- Location of Nova Zagora Municipality in Bulgaria
- Coordinates: 42°28′59″N 26°01′01″E
- Country: Bulgaria
- Province: Sliven Province
- Capital: Nova Zagora

Area
  - Total: 876.86 km^{2} (338.56 sq mi)
- Elevation: 162 m (531 ft)

Population (2011)
  - Total: 39,010
  - Density: 44.49/km^{2} (115.2/sq mi)
- Postal code: 8900
- Area code: 0457

Nova Zagora Municipality (Bulgarian: Община Нова Загора) is a municipality in the Sliven Province of Bulgaria.

== Demography ==
Ethnic composition of Nova Zagora Municipality
1. Bulgarians (70.7%)
2. Turks (14.1%)
3. Gypsies/Romani (3.67%)
4. No identification (11.2%)
5. Other (0.38%)

At the 2011 census, the population of Nova Zagora was 39,010. Most of the inhabitants were Bulgarians (70.65%) with a minority of Turks (14.08%) and Gypsies/Romani (3.67%). 11.18% of the population's ethnicity was unknown.

== Villages ==
In addition to the capital town of Nova Zagora, there are 32 villages in the municipality:

- Asenovets
- Banya
- Bogdanovo
- Bryastovo
- Byal Kladenets
- Diadovo
- Ezero
- Elenovo
- Zagortsi
- Kamenovo
- Karanovo
- Konovo
- Korten
- Kriva Krusha
- Lyubenets
- Lyubenova Mahala
- Mlekarevo
- Nauchene
- Novoselets
- Omarchevo
- Pet Mogili
- Pitovo
- Polsko Pudarevo
- Prohorovo
- Radevo
- Radetski
- Sokol
- Stoil Voyvoda
- Sabrano
- Sadievo
- Sadiysko Pole
- Tsenino
