= Korten, Bulgaria =

Korten Кортен
- Location of Korten, Bulgaria
- Coordinates: 42°32′44.13″N 26°0′0.49″E
- Country: Bulgaria
- Provinces (Oblast): Sliven Province

Government
  - Mayor: Mincho Atanasov
- Elevation: 193 m (633 ft)

Population (15.09.2022)
  - Total: 1,593
- Time zone: UTC+2 (EET)
  - Summer (DST): UTC+3 (EEST)
- Postal Code: 8930
- Area codes: 04522 from Bulgaria, 003594522 from outside

Korten (Bulgarian: Кортен) is a village in central Bulgaria. It has a population of 1,593 as of 2022.

== Geography ==
Korten is located in eastern Sliven Province and has a territory of 52.006 km^{2}. It is part of Nova Zagora Municipality. The distance from the municipal center Nova Zagora is 6 km. It is situated halfway between the major cities of Stara Zagora to the west and Sliven to the east, at 40 km from both. Korten is situated in the Upper Thracian Plain, at the southern foothills of the Sredna Gora mountain range. There is a school and a church. North of the village is the spa resort of Banya, also known as Kortenski Bani, meaning Korten Baths.

== Economy ==
The village lies in a fertile agricultural area. The most important crop is grape, with many vineyards surrounding the settlement. Korten produces red and white wines. There are also companies producing dairy products.
