= Timofei Silistaru =

Romanian politician

Timofei Silistaru (born in 1894 in Taraclia) was a Bessarabian politician. He served as Member of the Moldovan Parliament (1917–1918).
