= Colibabovca =

Colibabovca Rosental
- Village
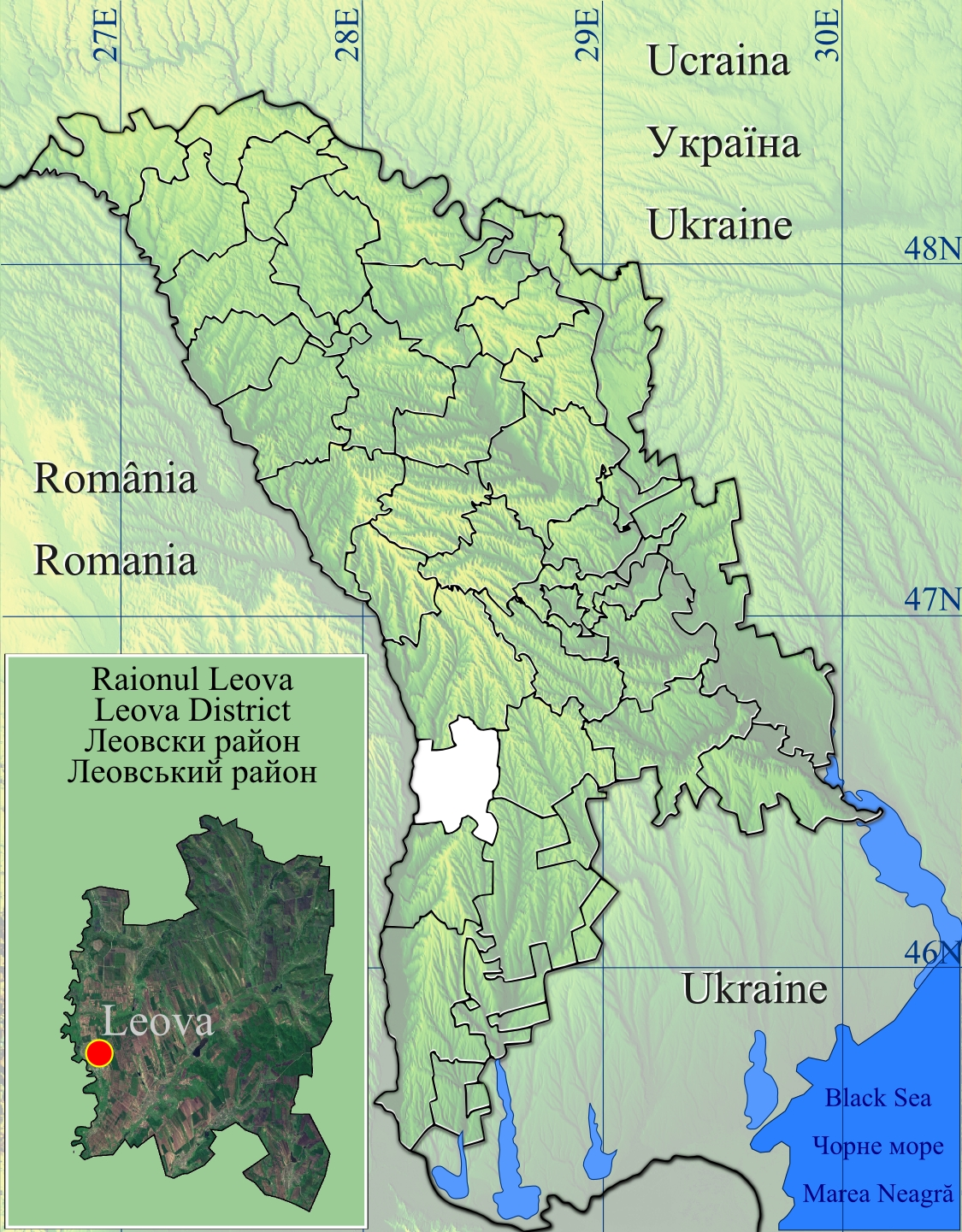
- Location within Moldova Leova
- Coordinates: 46°38′51″N 28°25′43″E
- Country: Moldova

Government
  - Mayor: Gheorghe Șavriev (PCRM)
- Elevation: 127 m (417 ft)

Population (2014 census)
  - Total: 891
- Time zone: UTC+2 (EET)
  - Summer (DST): UTC+3 (EEST)
- Postal code: MD-6316

Colibabovca is a village in Leova District, Moldova.
