= Kirill Kovaldzhi =

Writer

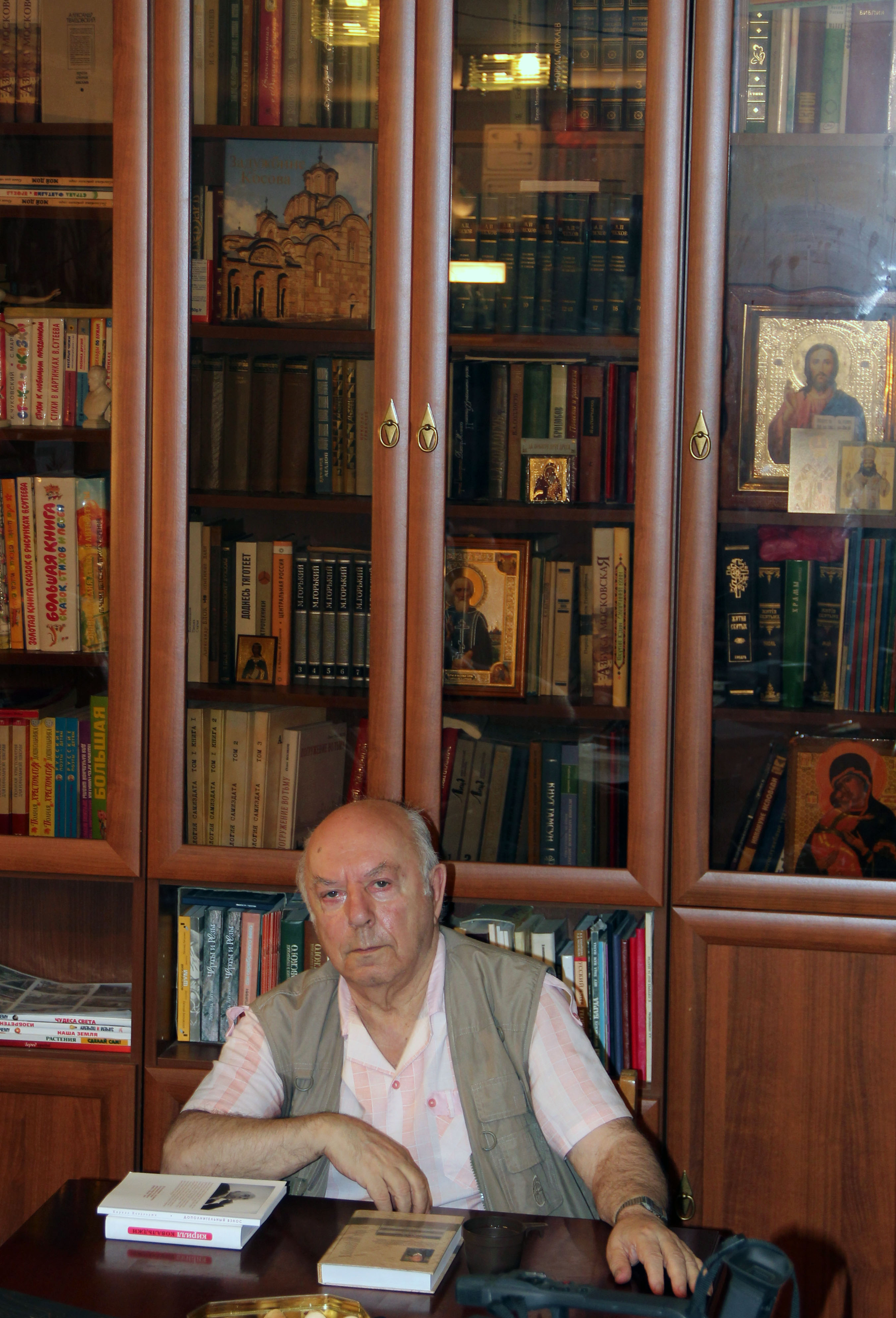
- Born: Kirill Vladimirovich Kovaldzhi; March 14, 1930; Tașlîc, Kingdom of Romania
- Died: April 10, 2017 (aged 87); Moscow, Russia
- Occupations: poet, novelist, literary critic, translator
- Years active: 1954–2017

Kirill Vladimirovich Kovaldzhi (Russian: Кирилл Владимирович Ковальджи; March 14, 1930 – April 10, 2017) was a Russian poet, novelist, literary critic and translator.

== Biography ==
Kovaldzhi was born on March 14, 1930, in the Bessarabian village of Tașlîc (then Kingdom of Romania, now Moldova). In 1940 he moved to Akkerman (now Bilhorod-Dnistrovskyi), where he graduated from high school (1947) and Teachers' Institute (1949).

In 1949 he entered the Moscow's Maxim Gorky Literature Institute, who graduated in 1954, after which he worked as a journalist in Chișinău. In the same place he published the first collection of poems The Trial (1955), was admitted to the Writers' Union (1956), was elected a member of the board and chairman of the Russian section of the Union of Writers of the Moldavian SSR. Then came the poetry collections of The Lyrics (1956), Talk with the Beloved (1959), The Man of My Generation (1961), The Poems (1963), The Test of Love (1975).

In 1959 he was sent to work in Moscow as a consultant under the management board of the USSR Joint Venture, then as deputy chairman of the Inocommission of the Writers' Union (1969). Responsible editor of the magazine Works and opinions (1971), head of the department and a member of the editorial board in the magazines Literary Review (1972), Yunost (1979), editor-in-chief of the publishing house Moscow Worker (1992-2001). Member of the editorial board of the magazine Ring A, an almanac Origins. He was a member of the commission on pardons under the President of the Russian Federation (1995-2001). Works in the SEEP Foundation as the editor-in-chief of the Internet magazine Prolog.

In Moscow, he published collections of poems: At Dawn (1958), Voices (1972), After Noon (1981), Yearly Rings (1982), High Dialogue (1988), Links and Grains (1989), The Book of Lyrics (1993), The Invisible Threshold (1999), To You. On Demand (2002), the book of prose and poetry Countdown (2003), and the short book Zerna (2005).

The author of a number of short stories, the story Five Points on the Map (1965), the novel Liman Stories (1970) – his new supplemented edition, published under the title Candle in draft (1996), was nominated for the State Prize of Russia. Winner of the literary prize of the Writers Union of Moscow The Crown (2000). He was awarded medals of the USSR, Romania and Moldova. Honored Worker of Culture of the Russian Federation. Poems and prose translated into a number of languages, individual publications – in Bulgaria, Romania, Poland.

For about two decades he directed the poetry studio, lectured and conducted creative seminars at the Literary Institute. Translator of poetry and prose of Romanian and Moldovan writers, critic, publicist. Secretary of the Writers' Union of Moscow, he is a member of PEN Russia.

Honored Worker of Culture of the Russian Federation (2006).

Kovaldzhi died in Moscow on April 10, 2017.
