= Gregory Tsamblak State University =

Public university in Moldova

- Universitatea de Stat „Grigore Țamblac” din Taraclia
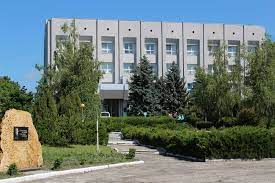
- Type: Public
- Active: 2004–2023
- Affiliations: Ion Creangă State Pedagogical University
- Location: Taraclia, Moldova; 45.9131°N 28.6706°E
- Website: Archive
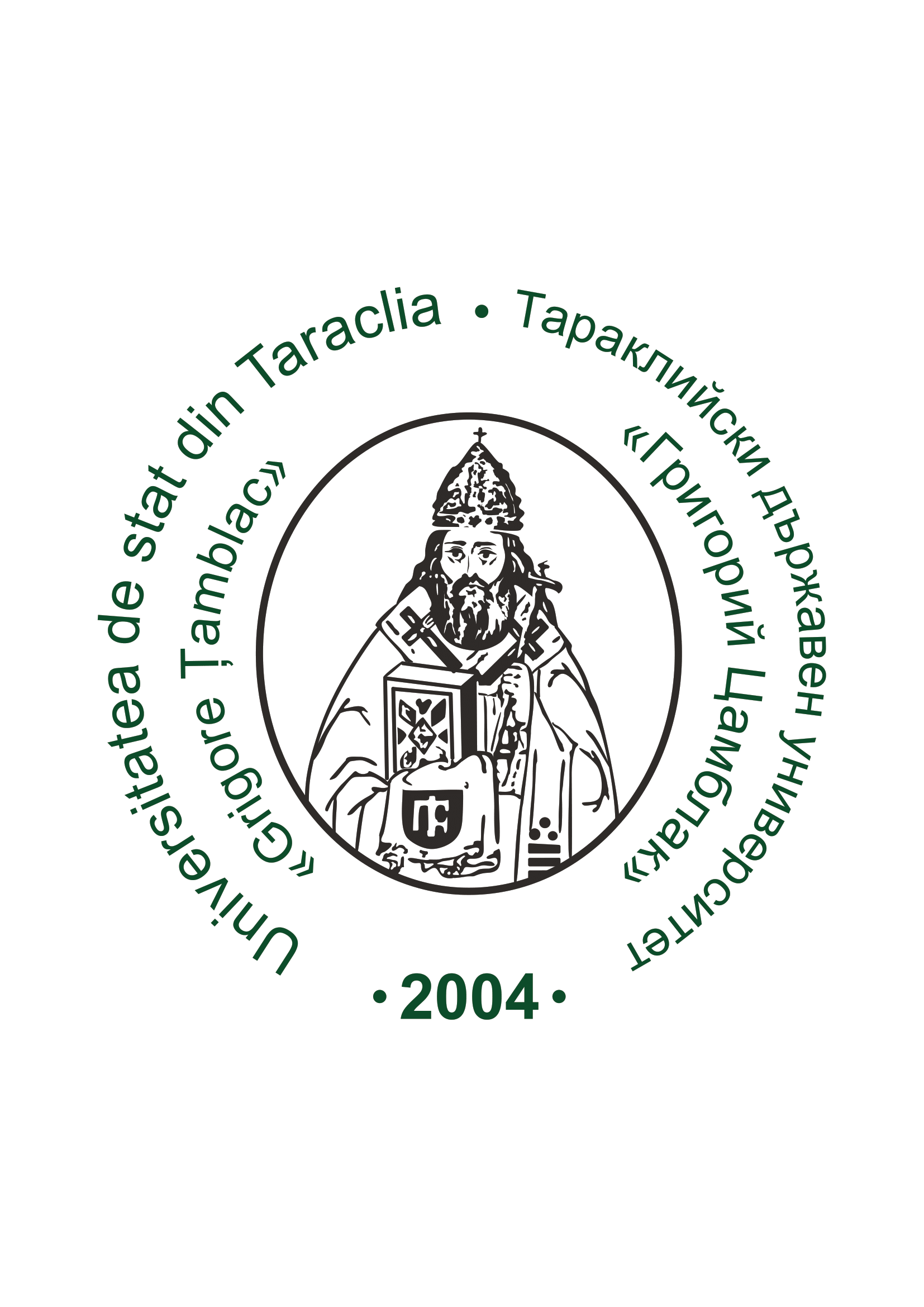

The Gregory Tsamblak State University (Romanian: Universitatea de Stat „Grigore Țamblac” din Taraclia; Bulgarian: Тараклийски държавен университет "Григорий Цамблак") was a public university located in Taraclia, Moldova. It was dissolved in 2023.

== History ==
The University grew out of the St. Cyril and Methodius Tarakley Pedagogical College being established by decree of Moldovan President Vladimir Voronin on March 31, 2004 as the Tarakliy State University. Primarily a teachers college to train prospective teachers how to give classes in Moldovan, Bulgarian and at least one other foreign language.

The University was opened on 1 October 2004 with a ceremony attended by Voronin and the President of Bulgaria Georgi Parvanov The university was designed to service the Besserabian Bulgarian population of Southern Moldova and was the only university among Bulgarian communities outside of Bulgaria.

In 2009 the Moldovan government changed the University's name to the Gregory Tsamblak State University after the Bulgarian writer and cleric.

In 2019, Moldovan President Igor Dodon assured Bulgarian President Rumen Radev that the Moldovan side will transform the university into a branch of the Bulgarian University of Ruse. However, the school wanted to instead merge with Ion Creangă State Pedagogical University of Chișinău. The Moldovan government agreed to the handover to the University of Ruse on October 23, 2024, with Gregory Tsamblak State University being liquidated. At the time of its closure it only had 150 students.

== Courses ==
The university offers both undergraduate and postgraduate courses. Some of the topics taught at this university are—

- Bulgarian language and literature and Romanian language and literature;
- Romanian Language and Literature and English Language and Literature;
- Pedagogy of primary education;
- Music;
- History;
- Social protection services;
- Accounting;
- Preschool Pedagogy and the Romanian language and literature.
