= Taraclia =

Taraclia Тараклия
- City
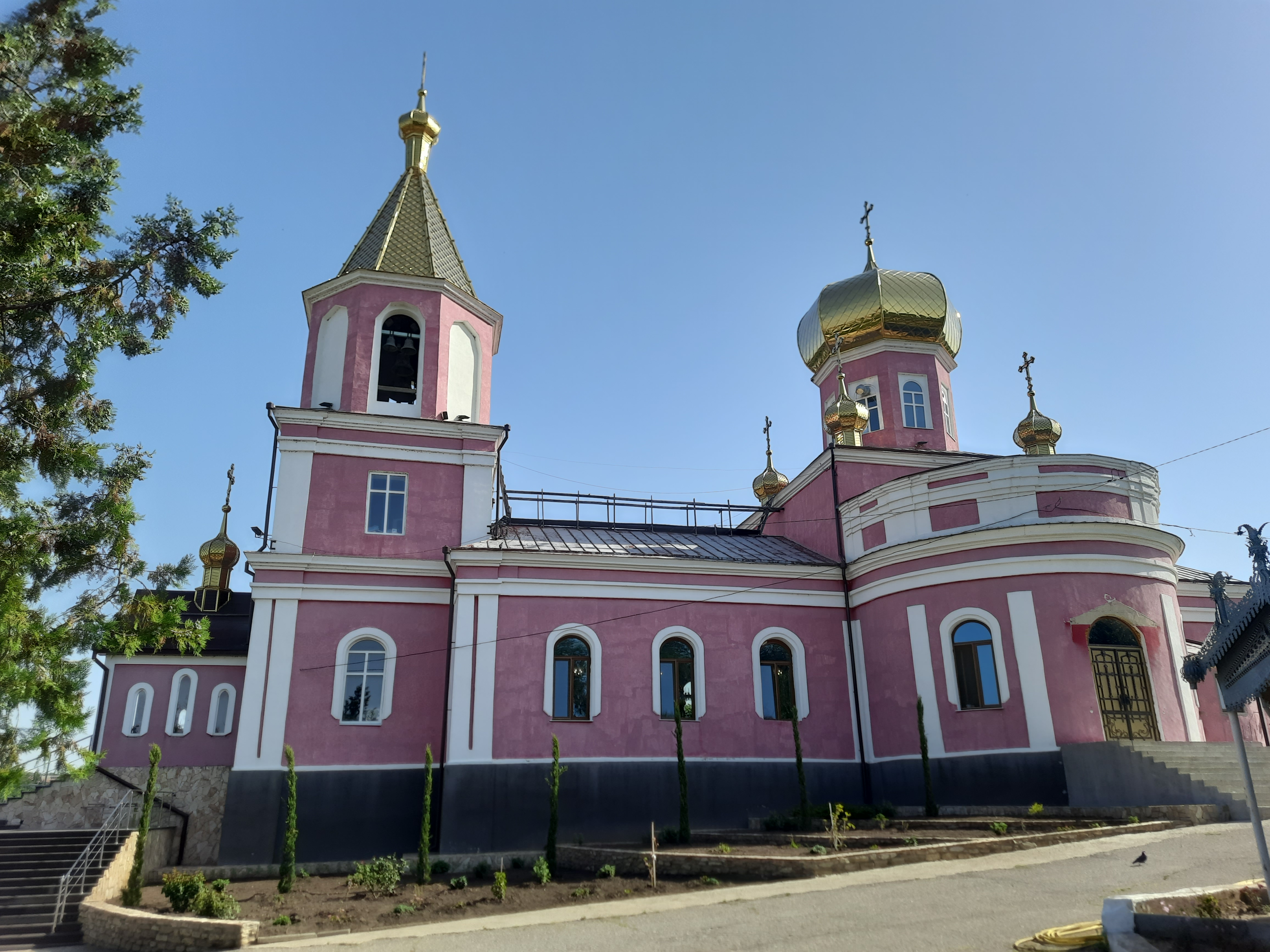
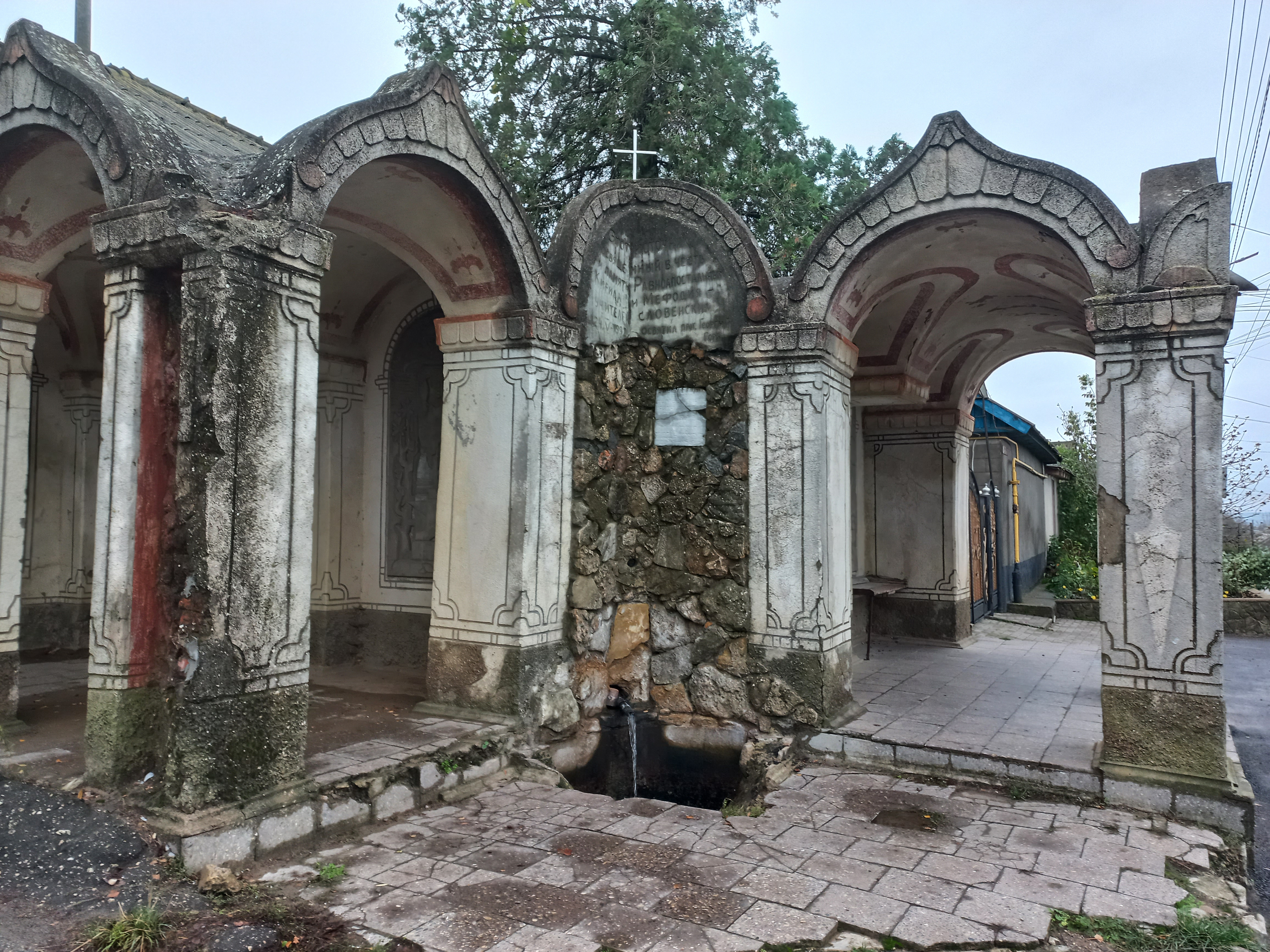
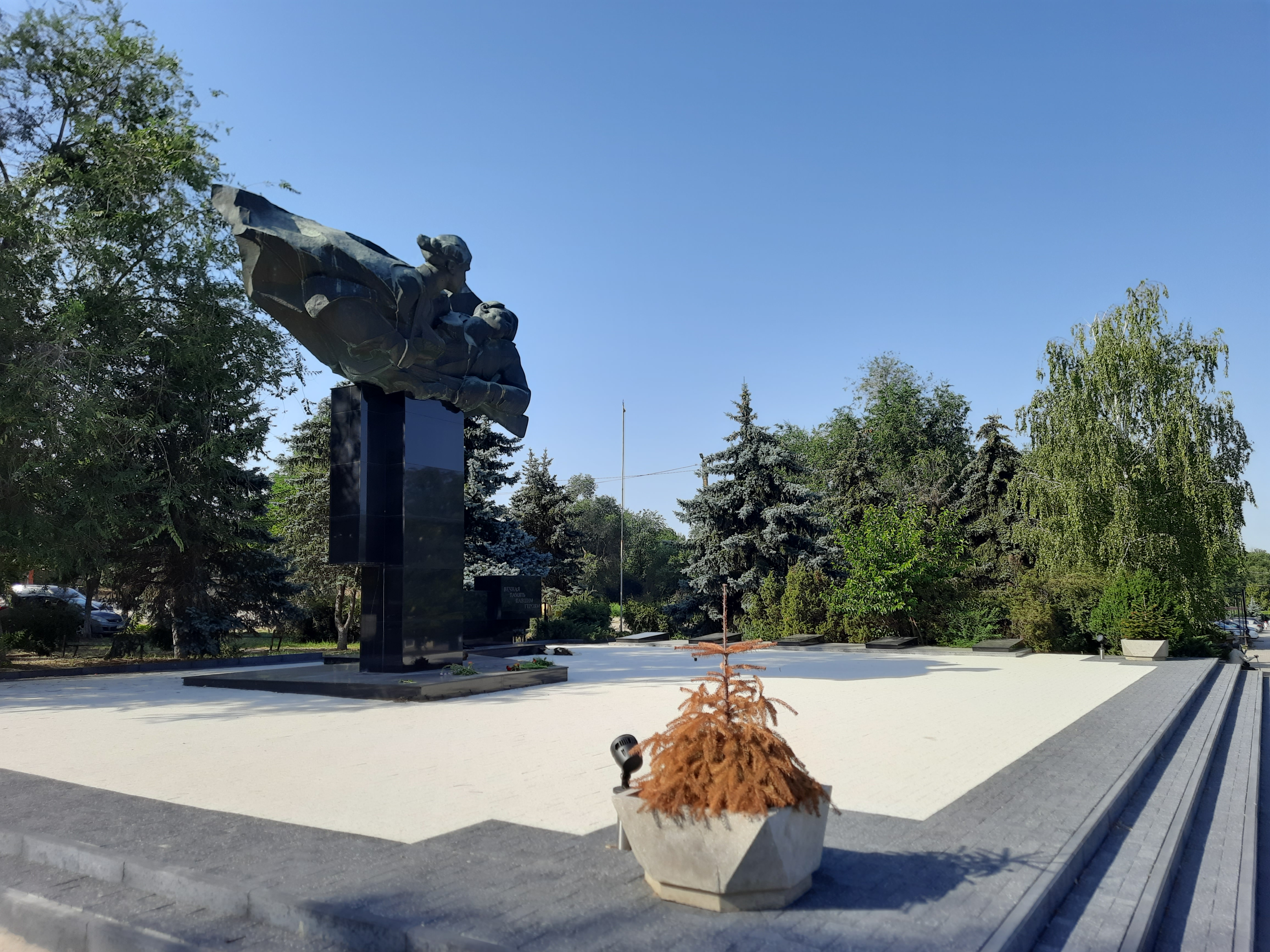
- Saint George church Hadjidinkova cheshma World War II memorial

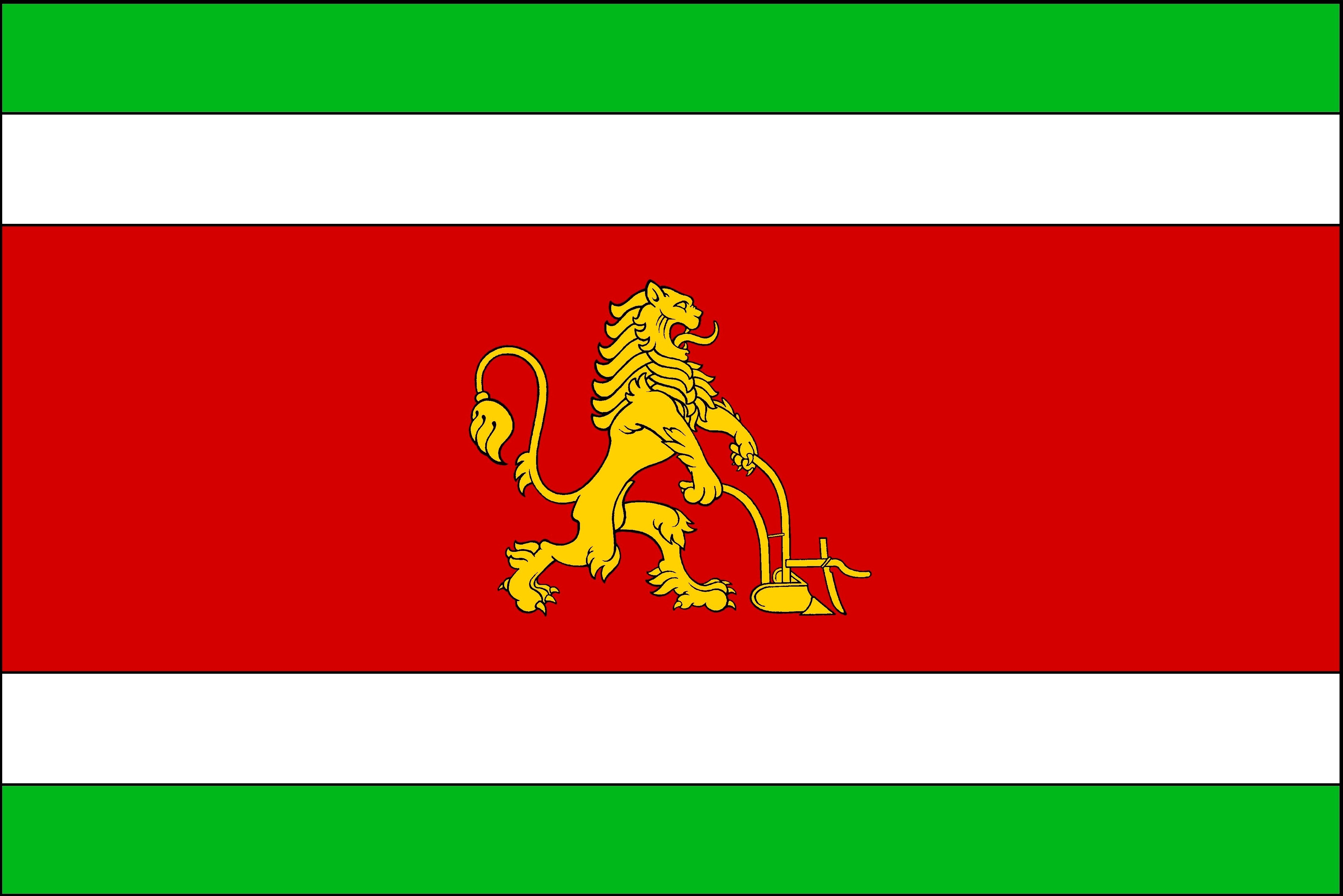
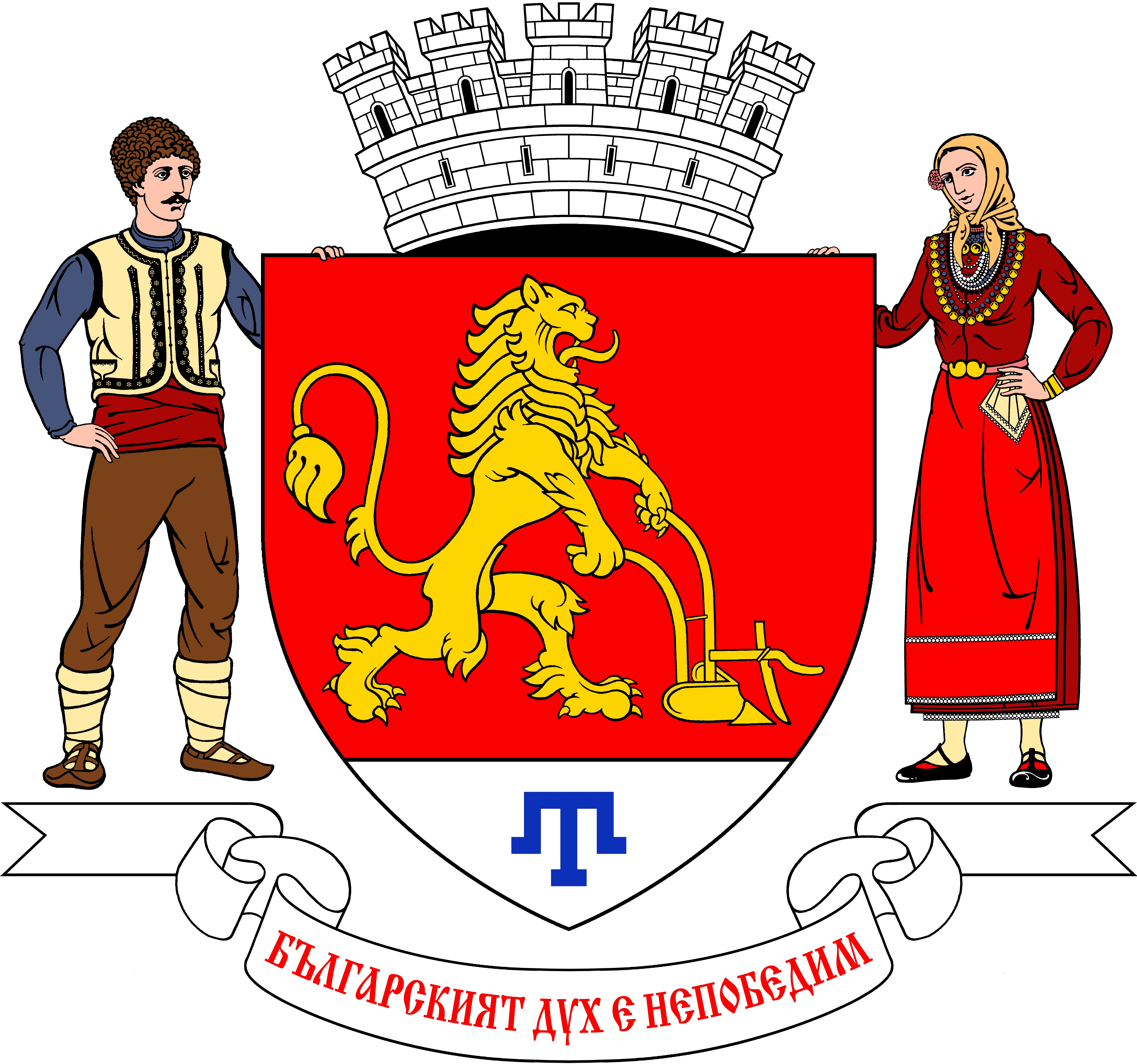
- Flag Seal
- Interactive map of Taraclia
- Location of Taraclia in Moldova
- Coordinates: 45°54′0″N 28°40′08″E
- Country: Moldova
- District: Taraclia District
- Founded: 1813

Government
  - Mayor: Ecaterina Iacobceac
- Elevation: 76 m (249 ft)

Population (2024)
  - Total: 10,021

Ethnicity (2024 census)
  - Bulgarians: 76.3%
  - Gagauz people: 8.2%
  - other: 17.7%
- Time zone: UTC+2 (EET)
  - Summer (DST): UTC+3 (EEST)
- Climate: Cfb
- Website: taraclia.md

Taraclia (Romanian pronunciation: [taraˈkli.a]; Bulgarian: Тараклия) is a city located in southern Moldova. It is the capital of Taraclia District and the center of Bulgarians in Moldova.

== History ==
=== Prehistory ===
The earliest archaeological sites near the present day city show the existence of a settlement belonging to the Gumelnița culture, discovered in 1980. Human activity shows the construction of dwellings, dugouts, flint tools, grain and animal bones, pointing to livestock herding. Clay artifacts show influence from the Cucuteni–Trypillia culture pointing to the area being a contact point between the two cultures. Excavations have revealed large dwellings alongside ceramics, bronze and gold. The settlement likely ceased to exist due to a recorded wild fire in the area, wiping out the local Gumelnița.

Following the retreat of the Gumelnița, the Yamnaya culture spread into the area, shown by various burial mounds and wooden chariots found in the area, outgrown by the Catacomb culture.

During the Middle Bronze Age, members of the Multi-cordoned ware culture settled the region. They made distinct burial mounds, with the deceased usually buried facing the east.

=== Middle ages ===
In the 7th century the Bulgar Khan Asparuh led the Bulgar horde to the region of Budjak and the Danube, including the present day are of Taraclia. Migrations to the area lasted until the 8th century until the established First Bulgarian Empire retreated from Budjak due to pressure from the Pechenegs.

In 1569 around 30 clans of Nogais from the Astrakhan area arrived in the Budjak area, with several latter waves following. In the period of 1606-1637 the region was dominated by Nogai-Tatars of the Manghud tribe, which lasted until the Russian annexation of Bessarabia in 1812.

=== 19th century ===
The settlement of Taraclia was founded in 1813, although they have been settling there much earlier. It is believed the city derives its name from a Nogai-Tatar village named "Tarak" meaning ridge or comb, located south of the present day city or from a local Tatar clan named "Tarakly". The first settlers arrived at Taraclia during the Russo-Turkish war of 1806–1812. In 1821 it has settled a large group, which was originally located in the nearby village Aluatu. Following the Russo-Turkish War (1828–1829), a large wave of Bulgarian refugees from the Ottoman Empire, specifically northeastern Bulgaria, settled the area, corresponding to Tatars who were expelled from the area of Budjak. Initially the then village was founded by 49 families, with the latter wave of refugees bringing in an additional 241 people. Having the rights of colonists, they built houses and churches and had children, taking advantage of several decades of privileges granted to them by the Tsarist Russian government. By 1816 the settlement had a population of 1,312.

In the middle of the 19th century, the famous explorer Apollon Skalkowski wrote about them: "Residents, good hosts, herds of large cattle, sheep, and a great deal to the success of horticulture and viticulture, and women bred mulberry trees, collect the cocoons and have silk in large quantities"

=== Modern era ===
In the interwar period, the city was the seat of Plasa Traian, in Cahul County, Romania. During this period a portion of the population in the region migrated to South America, specifically Brazil. The Romanian state took no action to stop this phenomenon among people in Bessarabia, while not allowing migration of inhabitants in the "Old Kingdom".

In 1999 the city was the administrative center of the Taraclia County, which was later reformed to the Taraclia District.

2026 national reform proposals issued by the national government included special consideration for Taraclia, due to its Bulgarian population.

== Demographics ==
According to the 2024 census, 10,021 inhabitants lived in Taraclia, a decrease compared to the previous census in 2014, when 12,355 inhabitants were registered.

Ethnic composition of Taraclia (2024)
1. Bulgarians (76.3%)
2. Gagauz (8.20%)
3. Moldovans (Note: There is an ongoing controversy regarding the ethnic identification of Moldovans and Romanians.) (7.30%)
4. Romanians (0.10%)
5. Russians (4.00%)
6. Ukrainians (2.70%)
7. Others (1.20%)
Linguistic composition of Taraclia (2024)
1. Bulgarian (73.9%)
2. Russian (11.6%)
3. Gagauz (6.60%)
4. Moldovan (5.80%)
5. Romanian (0.10%)
6. Ukrainian (1.20%)
7. Other (0.70%)

Historical population

Year	Pop.	±%
1816	1,312	—
1835	2,376	+81.1%
1877	3,029	+27.5%
1930	8,507	+180.9%
1959	5,986	−29.6%
1970	11,336	+89.4%

Year	Pop.	±%
1979	11,717	+3.4%
1989	14,726	+25.7%
2004	13,756	−6.6%
2014	12,355	−10.2%
2024	10,021	−18.9%

== Education ==
The Gregory Tsamblak State University, co-funded by Bulgaria and Moldova, was established in 2004. The languages of education are Bulgarian and Romanian. In 2025 it was acquired by the University of Ruse in Bulgaria.

== Media ==
- Vocea Basarabiei, 101,9

== Notable people ==
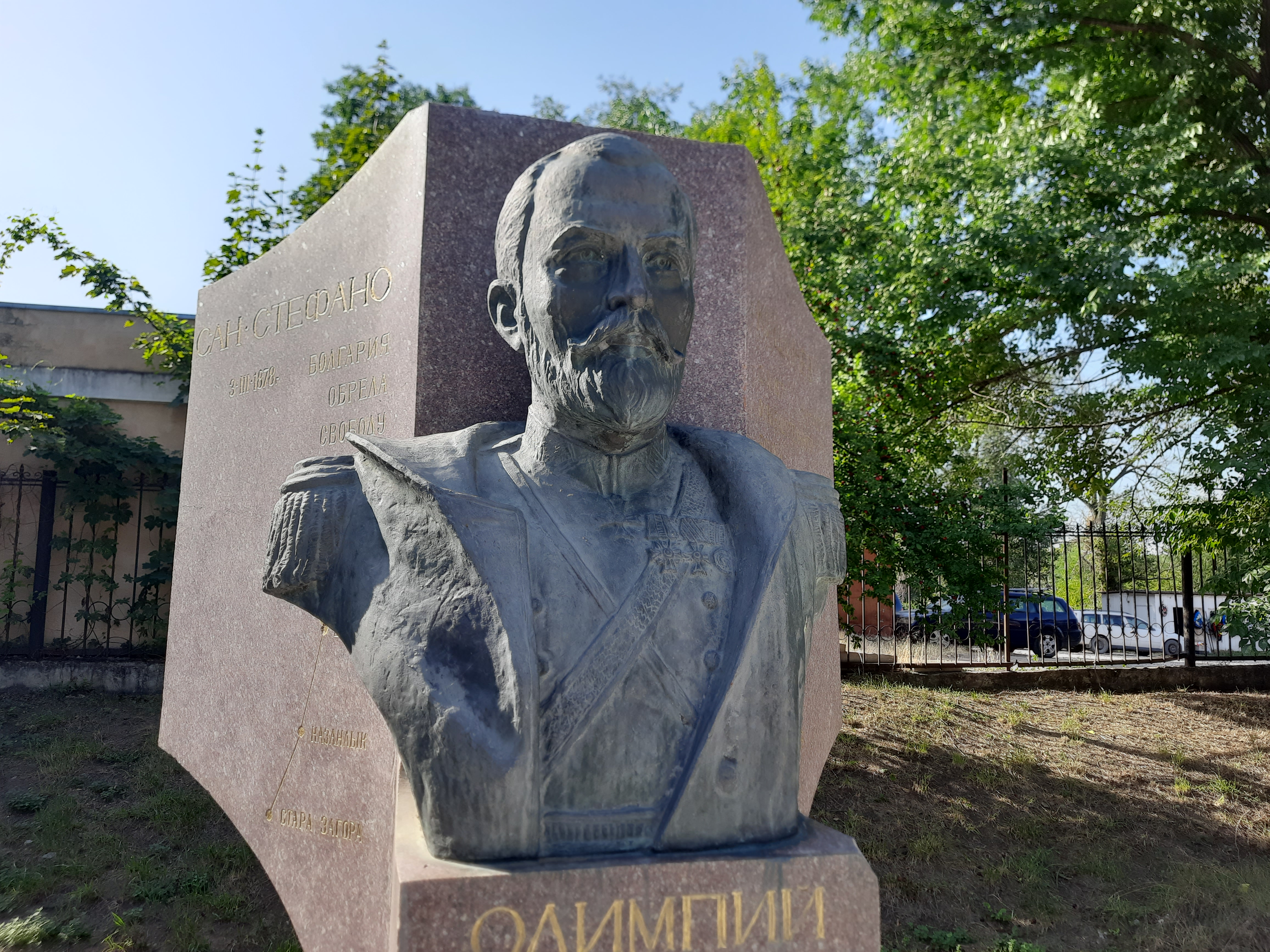
Bust of Olimpiy Panov

- Olimpiy Panov (1852–1887), Bulgarian military figure
- Timofei Silistaru, Member of the Moldovan Parliament (1917–1918)

== International relations ==
=== Twin towns – Sister cities ===
Taraclia is twinned with:

- Aksakovo, Bulgaria
- Nova Zagora, Bulgaria
- Sliven, Bulgaria
