= Nova Zagora =

Nova Zagora Нова Загора
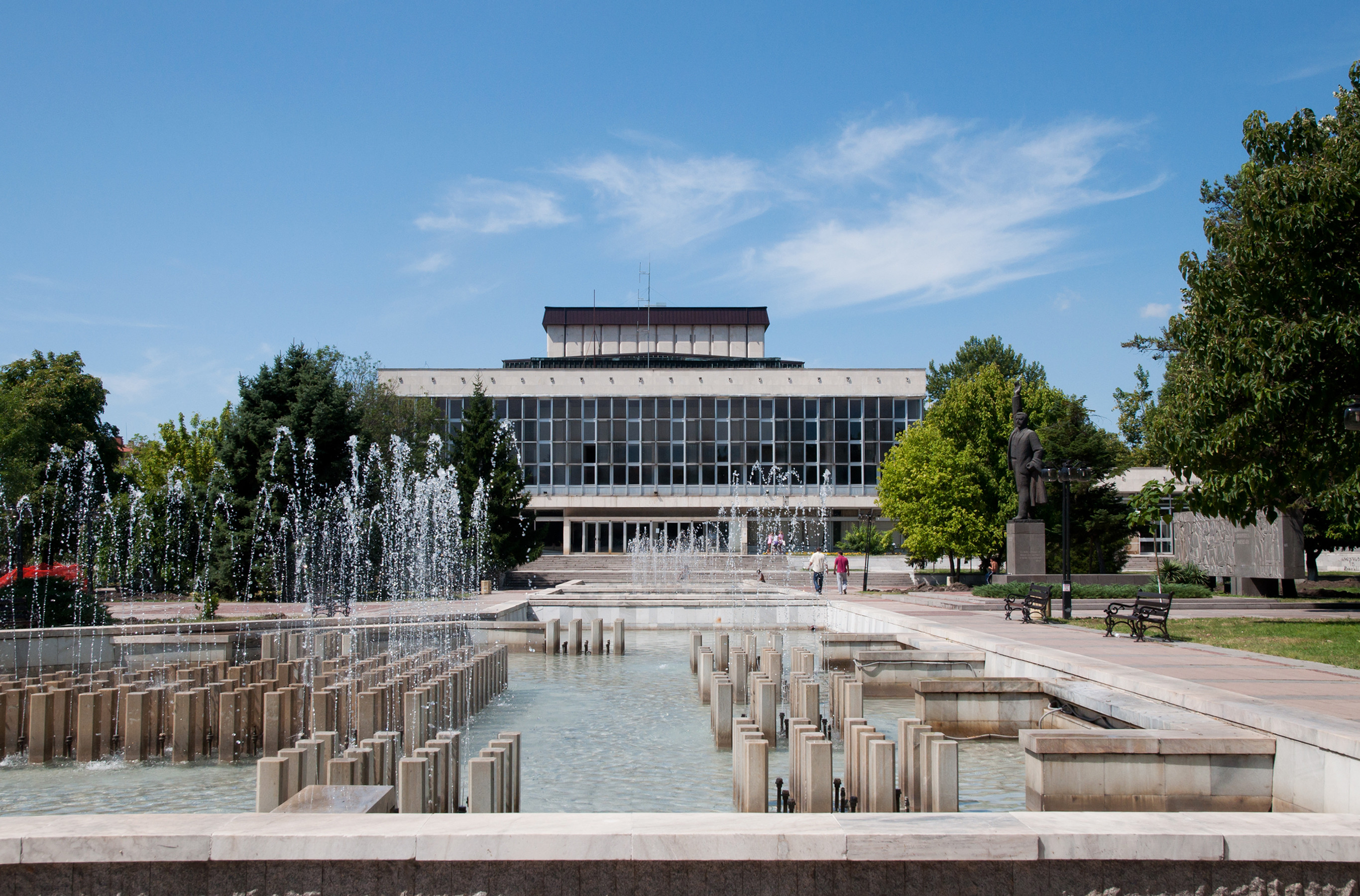
- The main square of Nova Zagora

- Coat of arms

- Location of Nova Zagora
- Coordinates: 42°29′28″N 26°0′52″E
- Country: Bulgaria
- Province (Oblast): Sliven

Government
  - Mayor: Galya Zaharieva

Area
  - City: 24.449 km^{2} (9.440 sq mi)
- Elevation: 131 m (430 ft)

Population (December 2021)
  - City: 34,041
  - Density: 1,392.3/km^{2} (3,606.1/sq mi)
  - Urban: 19,562
- Time zone: UTC+2 (EET)
  - Summer (DST): UTC+3 (EEST)
- Postal Code: 8900
- Area code: 0457
- Website: Official website

Nova Zagora (Bulgarian: Нова Загора [ˈnɔvɐ zɐˈɡɔrɐ]) is a town located in the southeastern plains of Bulgaria, in Sliven Province. It is the administrative centre of Nova Zagora Municipality. As of December 2009, the town had a population of 19,562 inhabitants, while the entire municipality (including surrounding villages) had a population of 34,041.

== Geography ==
Nova Zagora is located on the main Sofia-Plovdiv-Burgas railroad, as well as the Trakiya motorway that runs from Sofia to Burgas. It is 35 km east of Stara Zagora and 30 km west of Sliven. The Nova Zagora Municipality is part of the Sliven administrative district.

=== Climate ===
The climate is mild, with an average winter temperature of 1.2 °C and an average temperature in August of 23.5 °C.

== History ==
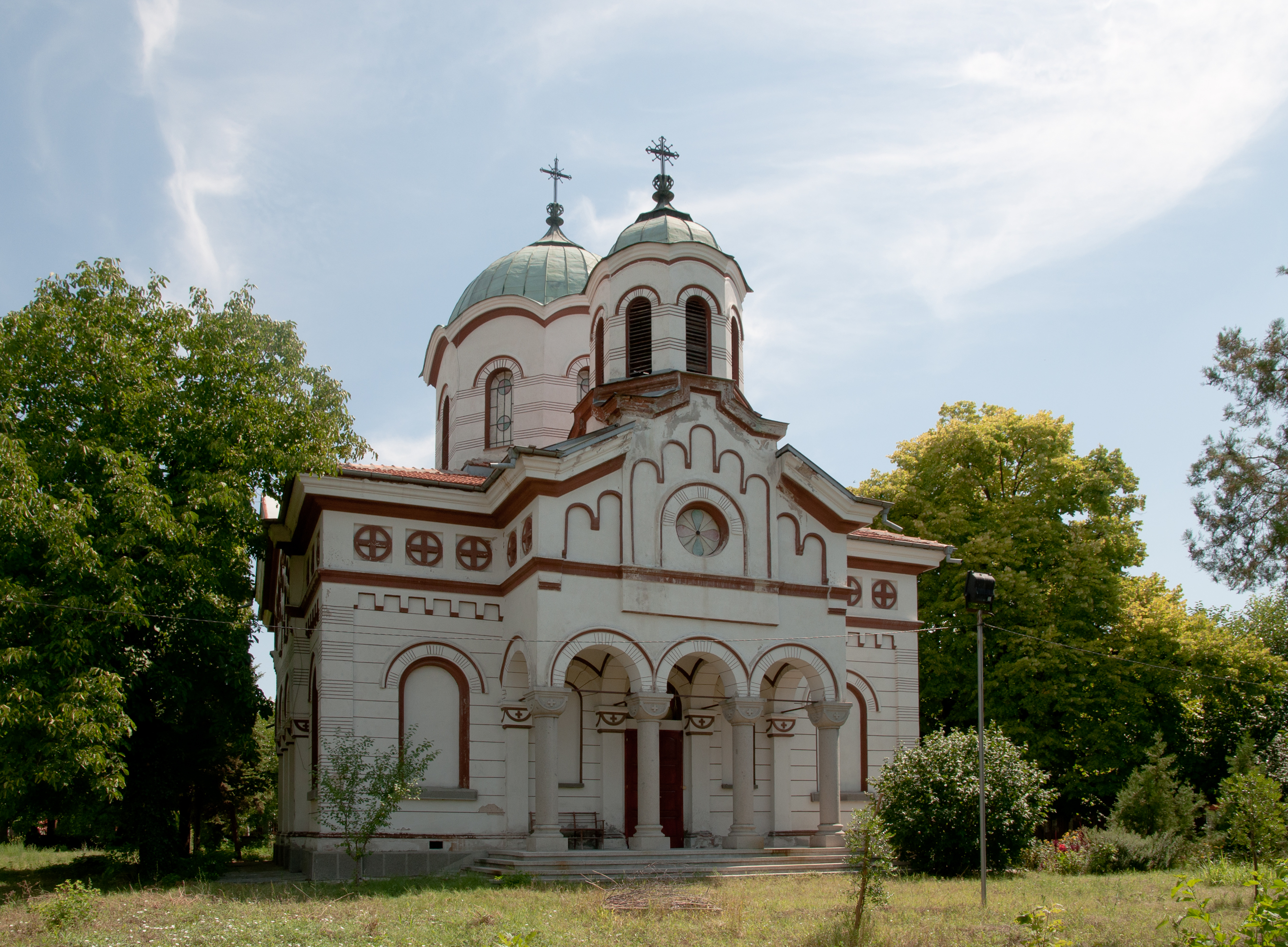
The Dormition of the Theotokos Church

The first traces of life in the region date back thousands of years. Many archeological sites are located in the region, showing settlements dating back to the Stone Age and the Stone-Copper age (Eneolithic). The most prominent archeological site is in the nearby village of Karanovo. The Nova Zagora Historical Museum has many historically significant artifacts dating back to this era.

== Economy ==
Nova Zagora is an agricultural center. The region is very fertile, growing a wide range of produce, including grapes, sunflowers, cereals and other. The surrounding region has many farms and vineyards, and various foods, herbs, and wines are produced in the towns and villages around Nova Zagora. The municipality has a manufacturing base including machine tools producer ZMM Ltd., agriculture equipment maker Perla Ltd., and textile manufacturer Miroglio Ltd.

== Sports ==
The town has a variety of sports facilities, including tennis courts, a soccer and athletics stadium, and karate. Nova Zagora also has a football (soccer) team called Zagorets Nova Zagora.

== International relations ==
Nova Zagora is twinned with:

- Feres, Greece
- Estoril, Portugal
- Petroșani, Romania
- Taraclia, Republic of Moldova

== Notable people ==
- Tsvetana Paskaleva, Armenian-Bulgarian journalist, documentary filmmaker, and a member of the International Documentary Association
