= List of cities and towns in Moldova =

There are 66 cities and towns in the Republic of Moldova.

== Alphabetical list ==
=== A ===
- Anenii Noi

=== B ===
- Basarabeasca
- Bălți
- Biruința
- Borceag
- Briceni
- Bucovăț

=== C ===
- Cahul
- Camenca
- Cantemir
- Căinari
- Călărași
- Căușeni
- Ceadîr-Lunga
- Chișinău
- Cimișlia

- Codru
- Comrat
- Cornești
- Costești
- Crasnoe
- Cricova
- Criuleni
- Cupcini

=== D ===
- Dnestrovsc
- Dondușeni
- Drochia
- Dubăsari
- Durlești

=== E ===
- Edineț

=== F ===
- Fălești

- Florești
- Frunză

=== G ===
- Ghindești
- Glodeni
- Grigoriopol

=== H ===
- Hîncești

=== I ===
- Ialoveni
- Iargara

=== L ===
- Leova
- Lipcani

=== M ===
- Maiac

- Mărculești

=== N ===
- Nisporeni

=== O ===
- Ocnița
- Orhei
- Otaci

=== R ===
- Rezina
- Rîbnița
- Rîșcani

=== S ===
- Sîngera
- Sîngerei
- Slobozia
- Soroca
- Strășeni

=== Ș ===
- Șoldănești
- Ștefan Vodă

=== T ===
- Taraclia
- Telenești
- Tighina (Bender)
- Tiraspol
- Tiraspolul Nou
- Tvardița

=== U ===
- Ungheni

=== V ===
- Vadul lui Vodă
- Vatra
- Vulcănești

== By status ==
There are 13 localities with municipiu status: Bălți, Cahul, Ceadîr-Lunga, Chișinău, Comrat, Edineț, Hîncești, Orhei, Soroca, Strășeni, Ungheni, Bender (Tighina), and Tiraspol. The other 53 have city status.

== By location ==
For the distribution of cities and towns by district, see List of localities in Moldova.

northern Moldova
- Bălți
- Biruința
- Briceni
- Costești
- Cupcini
- Dondușeni
- Drochia
- Edineț
- Fălești
- Florești
- Frunză
- Ghindești
- Glodeni
- Lipcani
- Mărculești
- Ocnița
- Otaci
- Rîșcani
- Sîngerei
- Soroca
central Moldova
- Anenii Noi
- Bucovăț
- Căinari
- Călărași
- Căușeni
- Cornești
- Criuleni
- Hîncești
- Ialoveni
- Nisporeni
- Orhei
- Rezina
- Strășeni
- Șoldănești
- Ștefan Vodă
- Telenești
- Tighina (Bender)
- Ungheni
Chișinău municipality
- Chișinău
- Codru
- Cricova
- Durlești
- Sîngera
- Vadul lui Vodă
- Vatra
southern Moldova
- Basarabeasca
- Cantemir
- Cahul
- Cimișlia
- Iargara
- Leova
- Taraclia
- Tvardița
Transnistria
- Camenca
- Crasnoe
- Dnestrovsc
- Dubăsari
- Grigoriopol
- Rîbnița
- Maiac
- Slobozia
- Tiraspol
- Tiraspolul Nou
Gagauzia
- Ceadîr-Lunga
- Comrat
- Vulcănești

== By population ==
Cities and towns in Moldova
Rank	City/town	Population								Administrative unit
Rank	City/town	Census 1930	Census 1959	Census 1970	Census 1979	Census 1989	Census 2004	Census 2014	Census 2024	Administrative unit
1.	Chișinău	117,016	213,078	358,890	526,023 (667,082)	661,410 (717,853)	589,445	532,513	567,038	Chișinău municipality
2.	Bălți	30,667	65,514	101,428	123,068	158,517	122,669	97,930	90,954	Bălți municipality
3.	Ungheni		12,595	19,558	27,062	37,788 (40,489)	32,530	30,804	26,457	Ungheni district
4.	Durlești					17,807	15,395	17,210	26,308	Chișinău municipality
5.	Cahul	10,437	16,068	26,572	32,695	42,904	35,488	30,018	22,223	Cahul district
6.	Orhei	14,805	14,131	25,707	30,260	31,843 (37,517)	25,641	21,065	22,183	Orhei district
7.	Soroca	14,661	14,895	24,465	31,831	42,297	28,362	22,196	21,135	Soroca district
8.	Comrat					25,822	23,327	20,113	19,120	Gagauzia
9.	Codru					11,716	14,277	15,934	18,310	Chișinău municipality
10.	Ialoveni				8,083	12,846	15,041	12,515	14,665	Ialoveni district
11.	Strășeni					20,119	18,320	18,376	14,497	Strășeni district
12.	Ceadîr-Lunga					23,161	19,401	16,605	14,285	Gagauzia
13.	Căușeni					20,761	17,757	15,939	13,458	Căușeni district
14.	Drochia				15,355	21,298	16,606	13,150	12,939	Drochia district
15.	Edineț					19,586	15,624	15,520	12,369	Edineț district
16.	Sîngera						7,354	9,966	12,368	Chișinău municipality
17.	Fălești				9,770	14,043	14,931	12,074	11,946	Fălești district
18.	Hîncești				16,317	19,235	15,281	12,491	11,391	Hîncești district
19.	Stăuceni						6,204	8,694	11,210	Chișinău municipality
20.	Vulcănești					18,230	15,462	12,185	10,919	Gagauzia
21.	Florești				~14,700	18,228	13,164	11,998	10,925	Florești district
22.	Taraclia				11,417	14,726	13,756	12,355	10,021	Taraclia district
23.	Sîngerei					15,023	12,667	12,465	9,954	Sîngerei district
24.	Cricova					7,164	9,878	10,669	9,536	Chișinău municipality
25.	Călărași				16,032	18,326	14,516	10,818	9,469	Călărași district
26.	Rezina				8,314	14,476	10,196	11,032	9,380	Rezina district
27.	Nisporeni				13,137	15,663	12,105	10,063	9,140	Nisporeni district
28.	Anenii Noi				7,000	9,954	8,358	10,872	8,933	Anenii Noi district
29.	Cimișlia				13,340	16,509	12,858	11,997	8,765	Cimișlia district
30.	Rîșcani					17,650	11,104	9,259	8,622	Rîșcani district
31.	Glodeni				10,179	13,180	10,465	8,676	7,284	Glodeni district
32.	Leova					12,203	10,027	7,443	6,394	Leova district
33.	Basarabeasca				12,959	14,517	11,192	8,471	6,291	Basarabeasca district
34.	Dondușeni				9,084	11,398	9,801	7,101	5,987	Dondușeni district
35.	Criuleni				7,138	9,452	7,138	6,708	5,844	Criuleni district
36.	Briceni					11,500	8,765	7,341	5,785	Briceni district
37.	Telenești				7,159	9,322	6,855	7,227	5,670	Telenești district
38.	Cupcini						7,441	7,190	5,493	Edineț district
39.	Ștefan Vodă				6,540	9,869	7,768	7,078	5,436	Ștefan Vodă district
40.	Ocnița					11,455	9,325	7,254	5,187	Ocnița district
41.	Șoldănești					7,578	6,304	5,883	4,797	Șoldănești district
42.	Vadul lui Vodă						4,559	5,295	4,280	Chișinău municipality
43.	Otaci					8,158	8,469	6,043	3,598	Ocnița district
44.	Lipcani						5,465	4,685	3,569	Briceni district
45.	Tvardița						5,882 (Note: Counted as rural)	5,420	3,503	Taraclia district
46.	Vatra						3,296	3,457	3,391	Chișinău municipality
47.	Cantemir				4,225	5,320	3,872	3,419	2,655	Cantemir district
48.	Costești						2,247	3,507	2,544	Rîșcani district
49.	Iargara						4,384	3,957	2,536	Leova district
50.	Biruința						3,093	2,625	2,203	Sîngerei district
51.	Căinari						4,184	3,803	2,135	Căușeni district
52.	Cornești						2,781	2,470	1,698	Ungheni district
53.	Ghindești						1,841	1,649	1,251	Florești district
54.	Bucovăț						1,313	1,601	1,064	Strășeni district
55.	Mărculești						2,081	1,396	1,049	Florești district
56.	Frunză						1,476	790	581	Ocnița district
*	Tiraspol	N/A	62,000	105,700	138,698	181,862	n/a	n/a	n/a	Transnistria
*	Bender (Tighina)	31,698	43,000	72,300	101,292	129,969	n/a	n/a	n/a	Bender municipality
*	Rîbnița	N/A		32,400		61,352	n/a	n/a	n/a	Transnistria
*	Dubăsari	N/A				35,806	n/a	n/a	n/a	Transnistria
*	Slobozia	N/A				18,748	n/a	n/a	n/a	Transnistria
*	Grigoriopol	N/A				11,712	n/a	n/a	n/a	Transnistria
*	Dnestrovsc	N/A				14,876	n/a	n/a	n/a	Transnistria
*	Camenca	N/A				13,689	n/a	n/a	n/a	Transnistria
*	Crasnoe	N/A					n/a	n/a	n/a	Transnistria
*	Tiraspolul Nou	N/A					n/a	n/a	n/a	Transnistria
*	Maiac	N/A					n/a	n/a	n/a	Transnistria

== Gallery ==
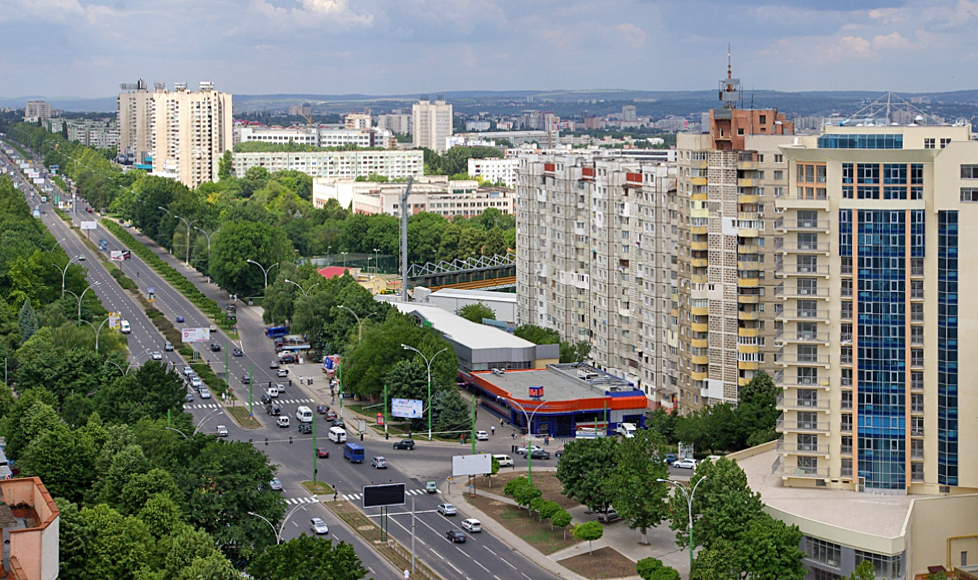
Chișinău

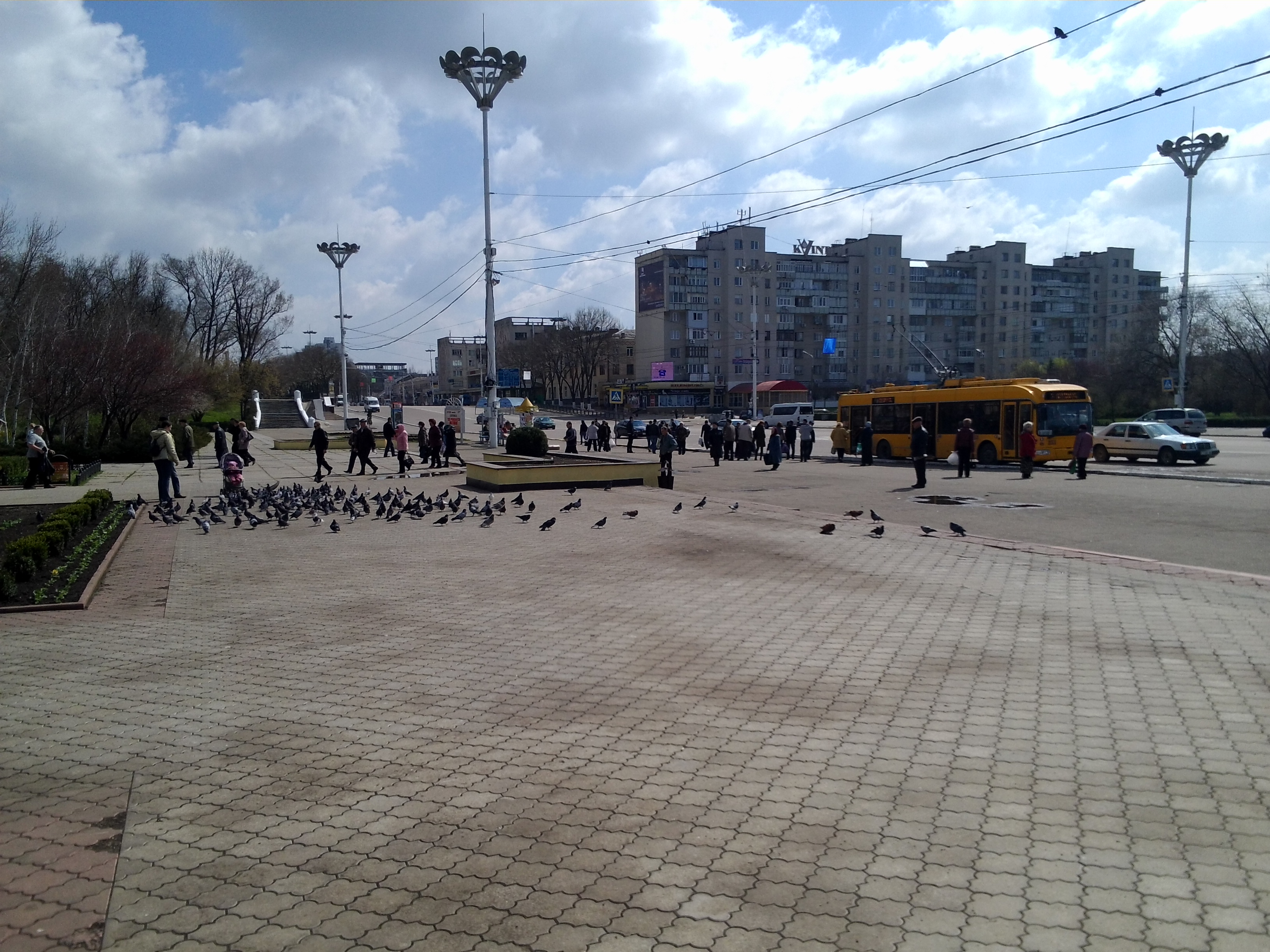
Tiraspol

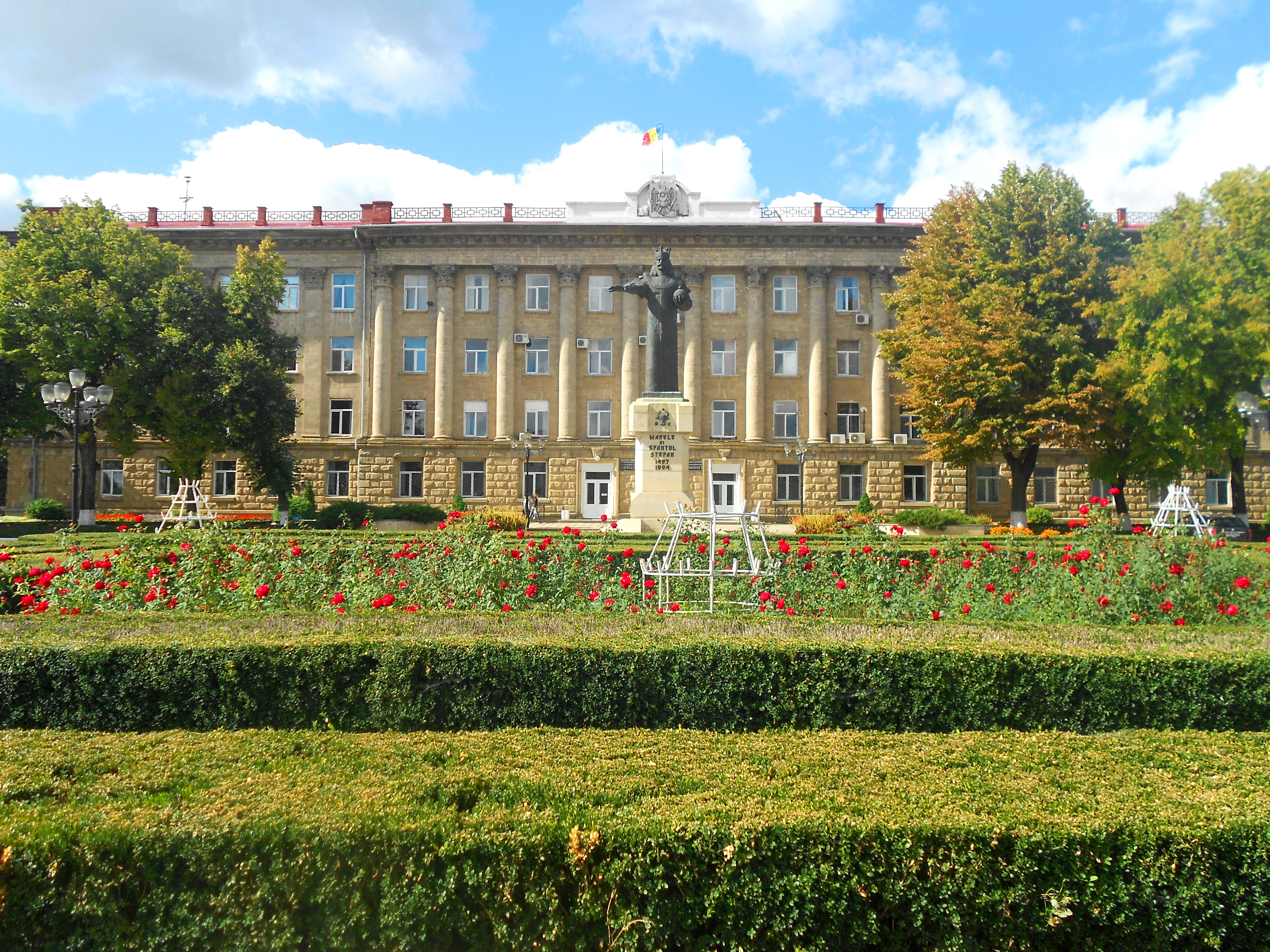
Bălți

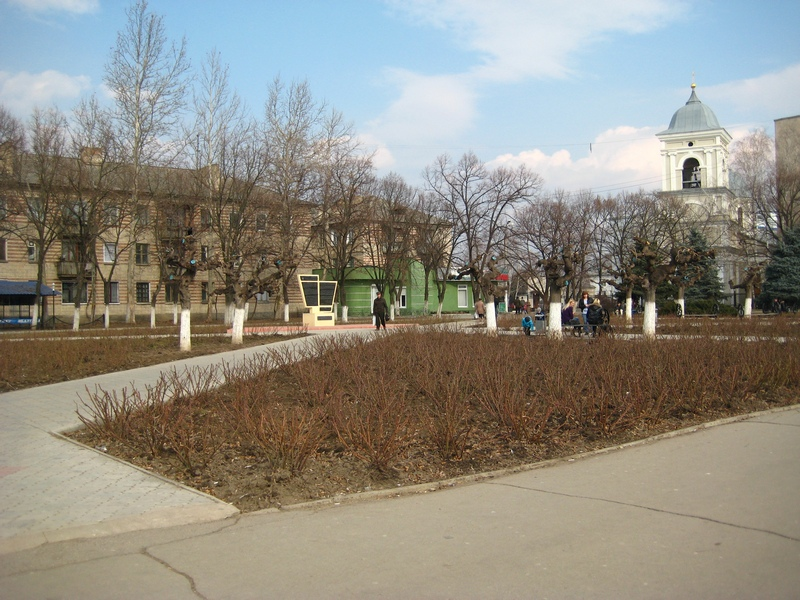
Bender (Tighina)

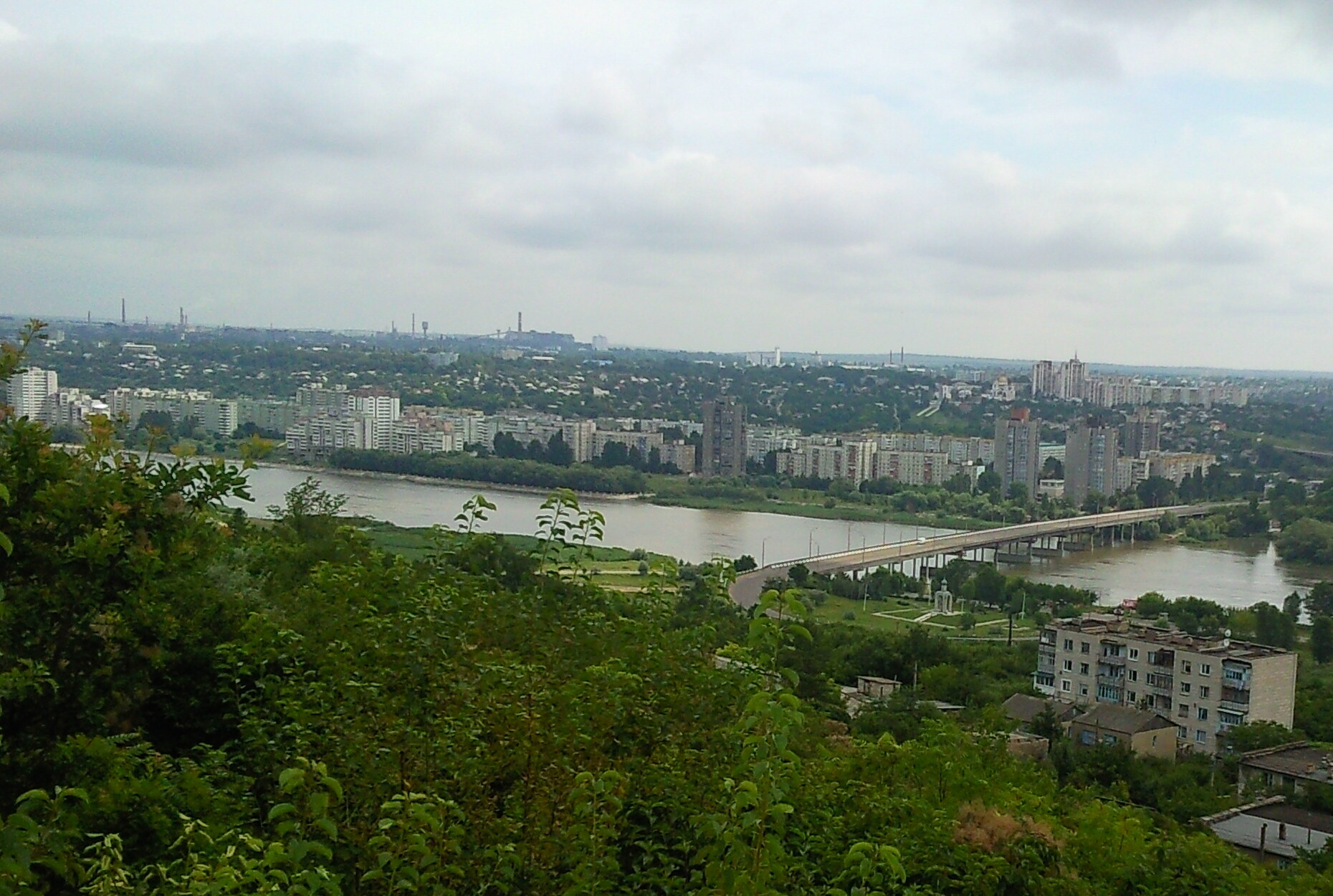
Rîbnița

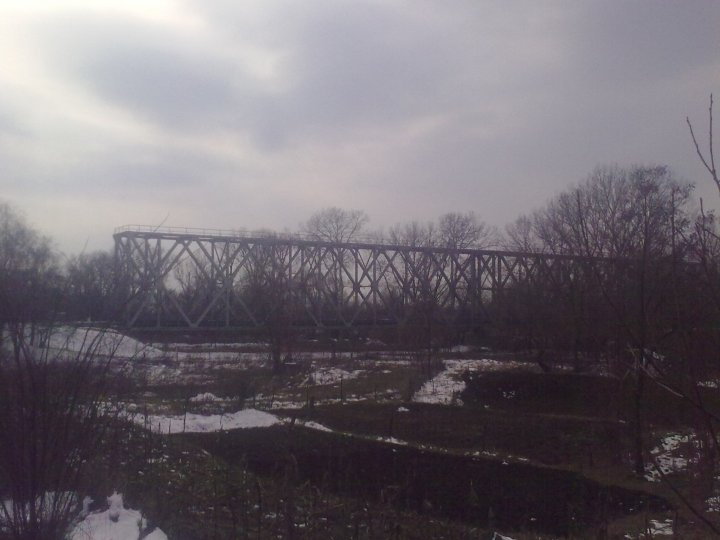
Ungheni

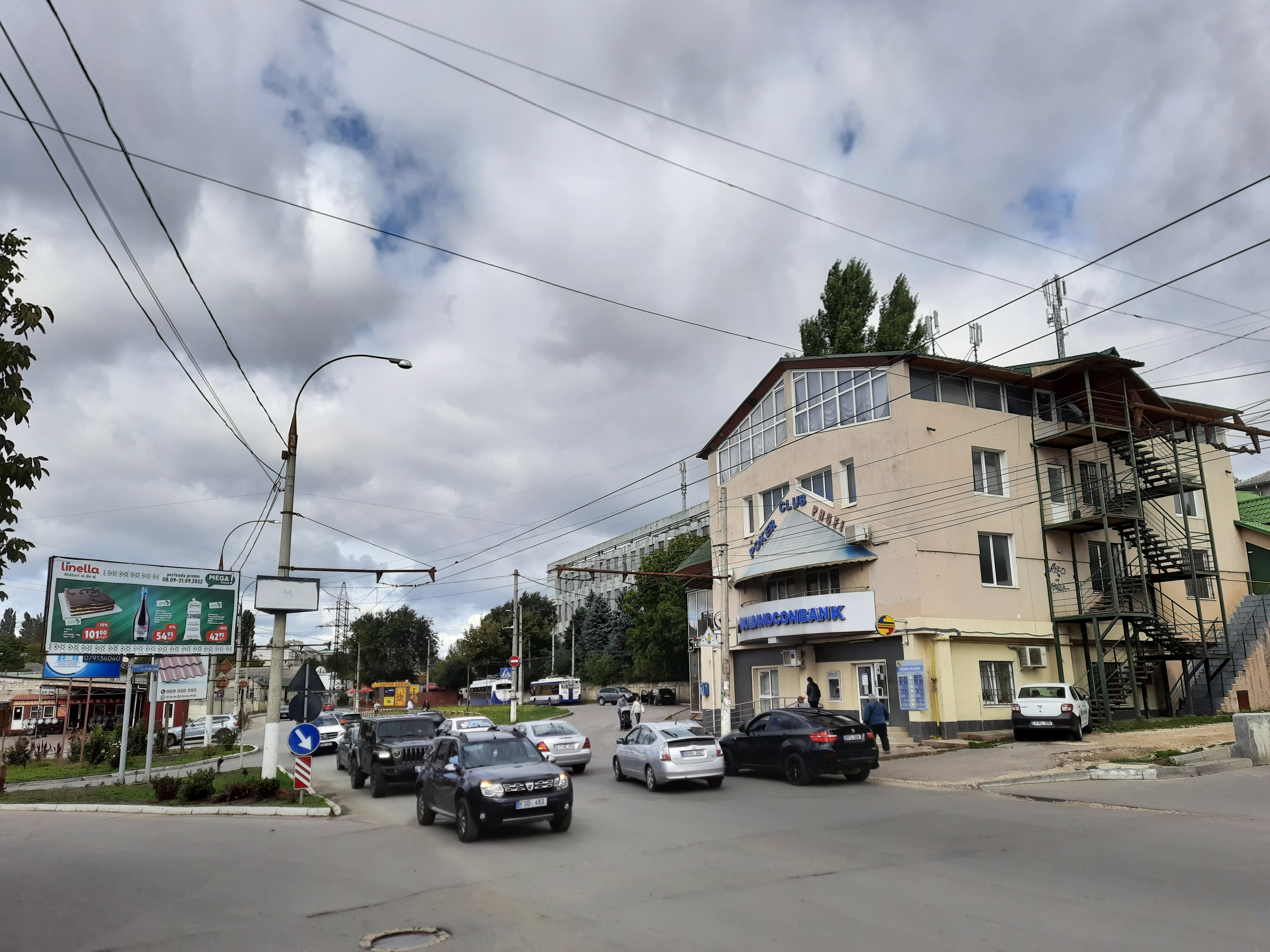
Durlești

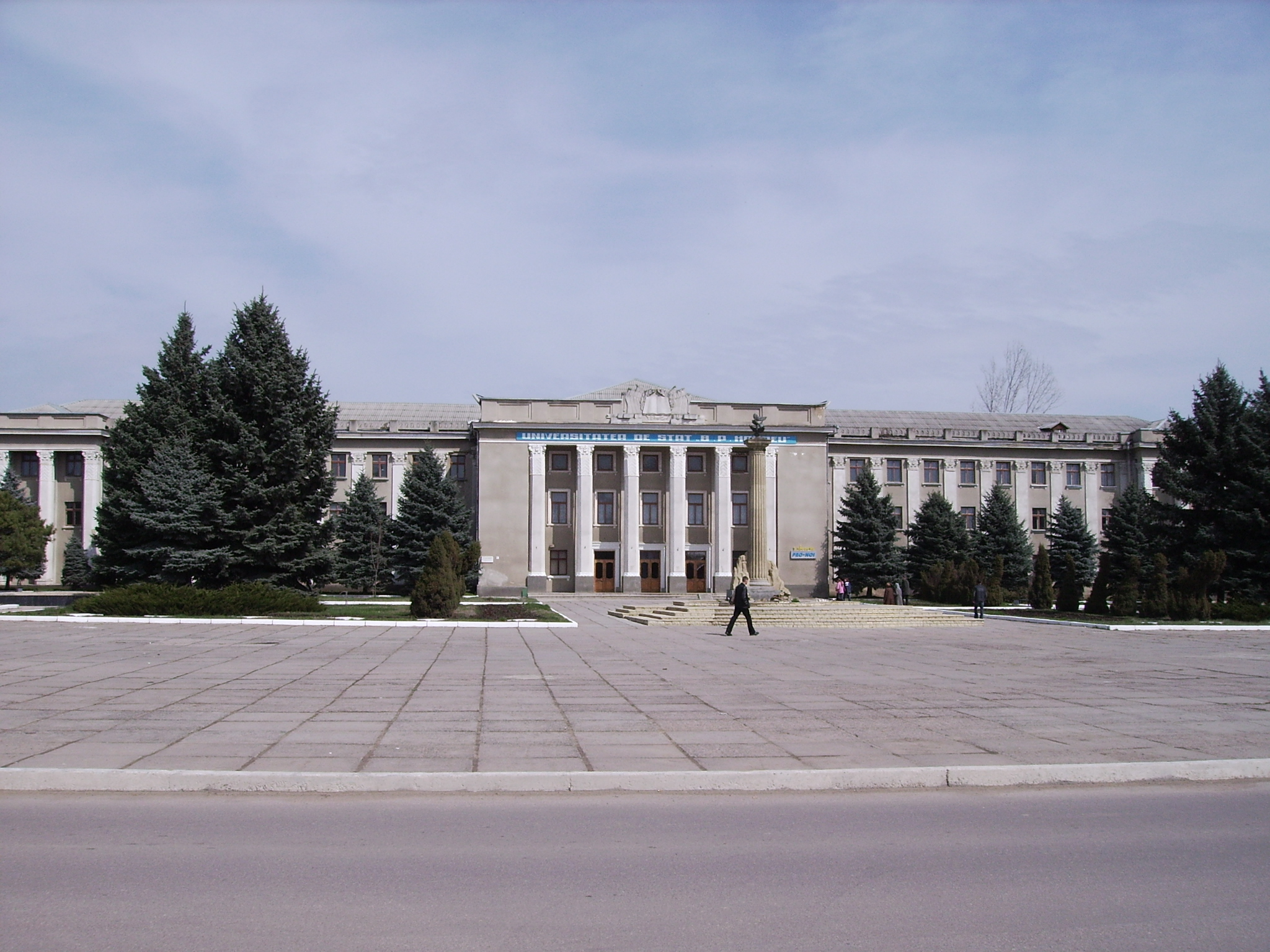
Cahul

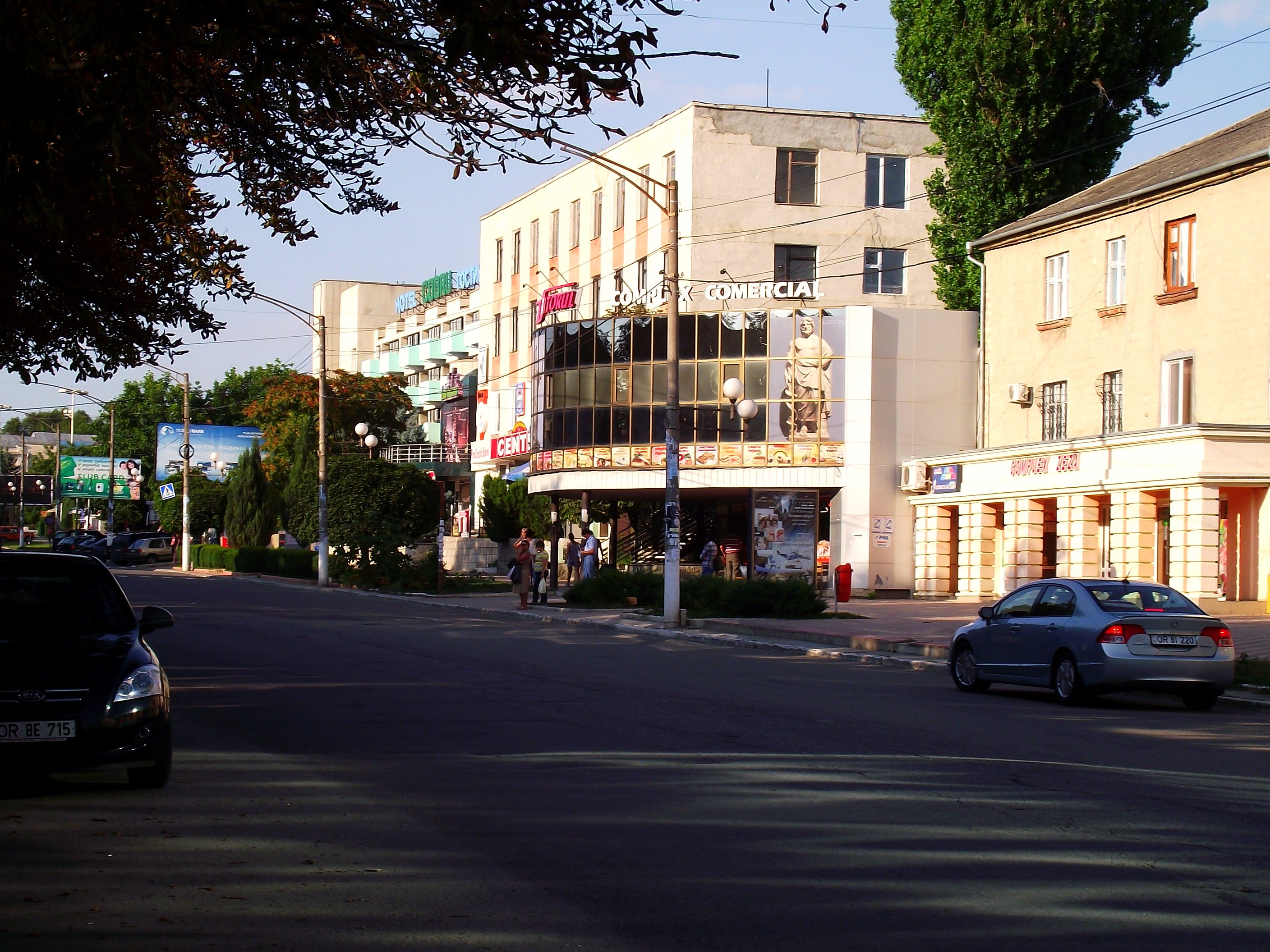
Orhei

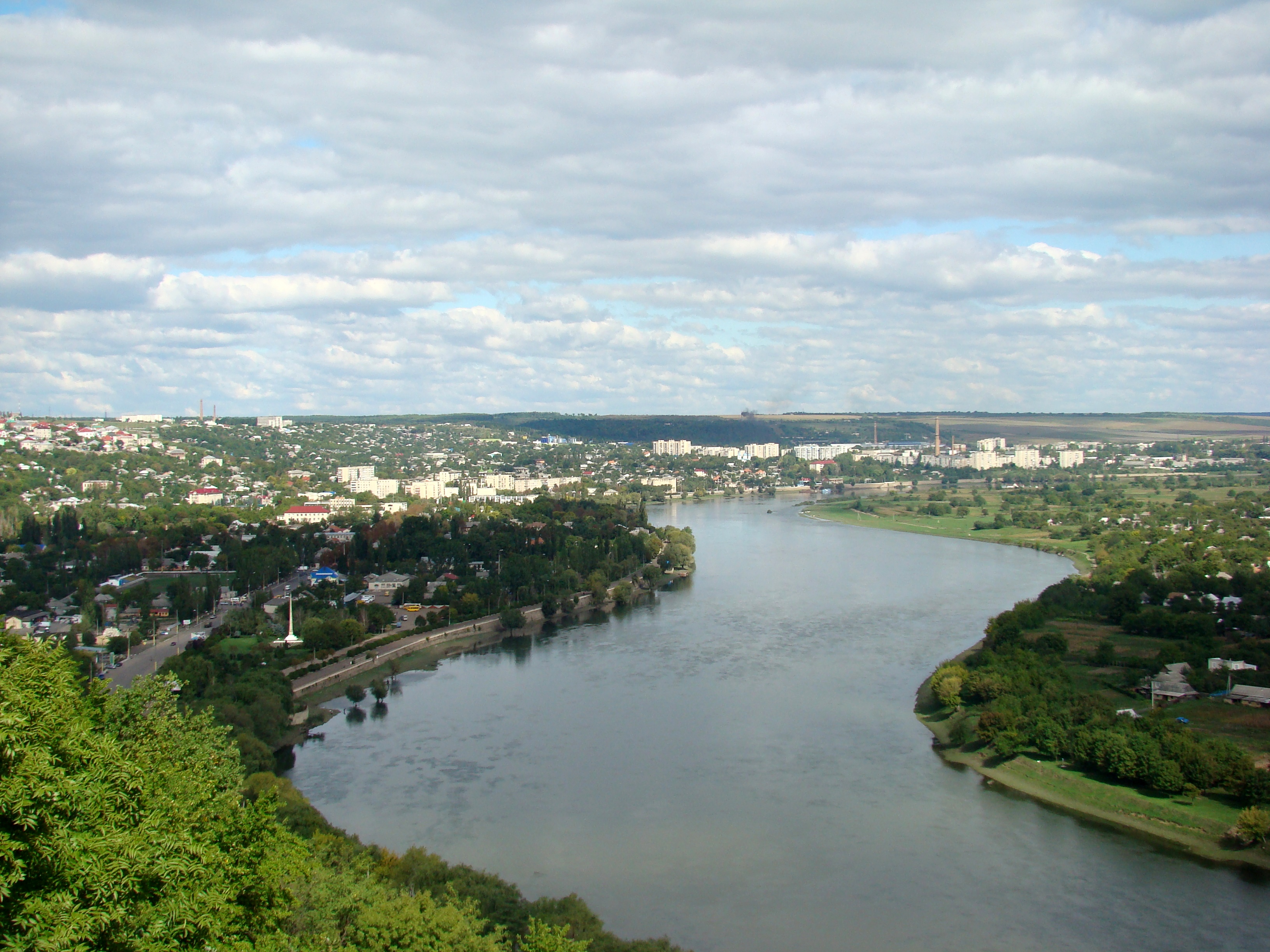
Soroca
