= Muncești Highway =

Street in Chișinău, Moldova

- Length: 20 km (12 mi)
- Location: Chișinău
- Coordinates: 46.9686588°N 28.9087686°E
- From: Gargarin Street
- To: Sîngera

Muncești Highway (Romanian: Şoseaua Muncești) is an urban highway located in the Botanica sector of Chișinău, the capital of Moldova. It is the longest street of Europe, with a length of c. 14 km (8.7 mi).

It starts at the boundary of the Botanica and Centru sectors, head to head with Gagarin Street near the Chișinău Railway Station, and ends at the city periphery with a viaduct near the town of Sîngera (administratively part of the Municipality of Chișinău), being continued to the south-eastern part of Moldova by the M14 road (part of European routes E58 and E581). It runs in parallel with the Moldovan inter-urban railway route Chișinău–Bender, at a short distance from it. There are 970 house (address) numbers throughout the route, and is the host for a big number of industrial enterprises.

The Muncești Highway is one of the oldest streets of Chişinău. In the XVI–XVIII centuries in this area was located a homonymous village, Muncești, which later was enclosed in Chișinău.
