= Japca =

- Commune
- Location within Moldova
- Coordinates: 47°58′55″N 28°42′13″E
- Country: Moldova
- District: Florești District

Government
  - Mayor: Leonid Pascari (Respect Moldova Movement)

Population (2014)
  - Total: 1,489
- Time zone: UTC+2 (EET)
  - Summer (DST): UTC+3 (EEST)

Japca is a commune in Florești District, Moldova. It is composed of two villages, Bursuc and Japca.

== Demographics ==
According to the 2014 Moldovan census, Japca had a population of 1,489 residents. The commune covers an area of 27.8 km², resulting in a population density of approximately 53.6 inhabitants per square kilometer as of 2014. Between the 2004 and 2014 censuses, Japca experienced a population decline of about 1.6%.

Women made up a slight majority of the population at 52.5%, while men accounted for 47.5%. In terms of age distribution, 16.3% of residents were under 15 years old, 68% were of working age (15–64), and 15.7% were aged 65 or older. The entire population lived in rural areas.

The vast majority of residents (98%) were born in Moldova, with small numbers originating from the Commonwealth of Independent States (1.5%) and the European Union (0.4%). Ethnically, the population was overwhelmingly Moldovan (97.%), with small minorities of Romanians (1.4%) and Russians (0.9%). Moldovan was reported as the native language by 94.5% of residents, followed by Romanian (4.3%) and Russian (1.2%). Nearly all inhabitants (100%) identified as Orthodox, reflecting a high degree of religious homogeneity.

== Administration and local government ==
Japca is governed by a local council composed of nine members. The most recent local elections, in November 2023, resulted in the following composition: 5 councillors from the party Respect Moldova Movement and 4 councillors from the Party of Action and Solidarity. The Party of Socialists of the Republic of Moldova and the Chance Political Party also ran, but didn't get any councillors selected. In the same elections, the candidate from the Respect Moldova Movement, Leonid Pascari, was elected as mayor with a 58.79% majority.

== See also ==
- Japca Monastery
