= Cotovca =

Cotovca may refer to several places in Moldova:

- Cotovca, a village in Dobrogea Veche Commune, Sîngerei district
- Cotovca, a village in Carmanova Commune, Transnistria
