= Tiraspolul Nou =

Tiraspolul Nou Новотира́спольский Новотира́спольський
- Town
- Location of Tiraspolul Nou in Moldova
- Country (de jure): Moldova
- Country (de facto): Transnistria (Note: Transnistria's political status is disputed. It considers itself to be an independent state, but this is not recognised by any UN member state. The Moldovan government and the international community consider Transnistria a part of Moldova's territory.)

Population (2004)
  - Total: 1,488

Tiraspolul Nou (Moldovan Cyrillic: Тирасполул Ноу; Russian: Новотираспольский, romanized: Novotiraspolskiy; Ukrainian: Новотираспольський, romanized: Novotyraspolskyi; lit. 'New Tiraspol'), is a town in Transnistria (de facto) in Moldova (de jure). In Transnistria, it is considered to be only a part of Tiraspol (located in the south-west of the country).
