= Japca Monastery =

Coordinates: 47°59′17″N 28°42′42″E

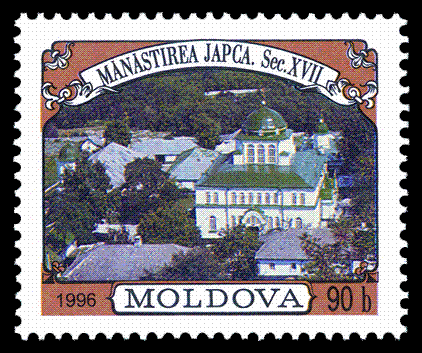
- 1996 stamp
- Japca Monastery
- Location: Japca, Florești District
- Country: Moldova
- Denomination: Eastern Orthodoxy

History
- Status: Monastery
- Founded: 1693

The Japca Monastery (Romanian: Mănăstirea Japca) is a monastery in Florești District, Moldova. The Japca Monastery is situated on the shore of Nistru River at a distance of 10 kilometres (6.2 mi) from Camenca. It is the only monastery from Basarabia which was never closed by the Soviet authorities. The monastery has no electricity and services are conducted in old Church Slavonic.

== History ==
The founding of the monastery is unclear. There is a legend that a monk named Ezekiel, from the Deleni monastery, built a church carved into the rock and a monastery here at the end of the 17th century, which he dedicated to the Exaltation of the Holy Cross. A second story is that a monk named Theodosius founded the monastery here after buildings on the site were destroyed by the Tartars and an earthquake.

One of the Japca churches is a stone church built in 1825 by local landowner Constantin Andronovich Stati, and dedicated to the Ascension. In 1949 Mihai Lobov, from Chisinau, built another church dedicated to St. Archangel Michael. The main church has been rebuilt several times, and has three altars.

It is the only monastery from Basarabia which was never closed by the Soviet authorities.

The monastery has no electricity, the residents do not eat meat, and services are carried out in old Church Slavonic. There are springs at the site that are considered to have healing properties.

An image of the monastery appeared on a 90b postage stamp issued by the Moldovan Post Office in 1996.
