= Biruința =

- Town
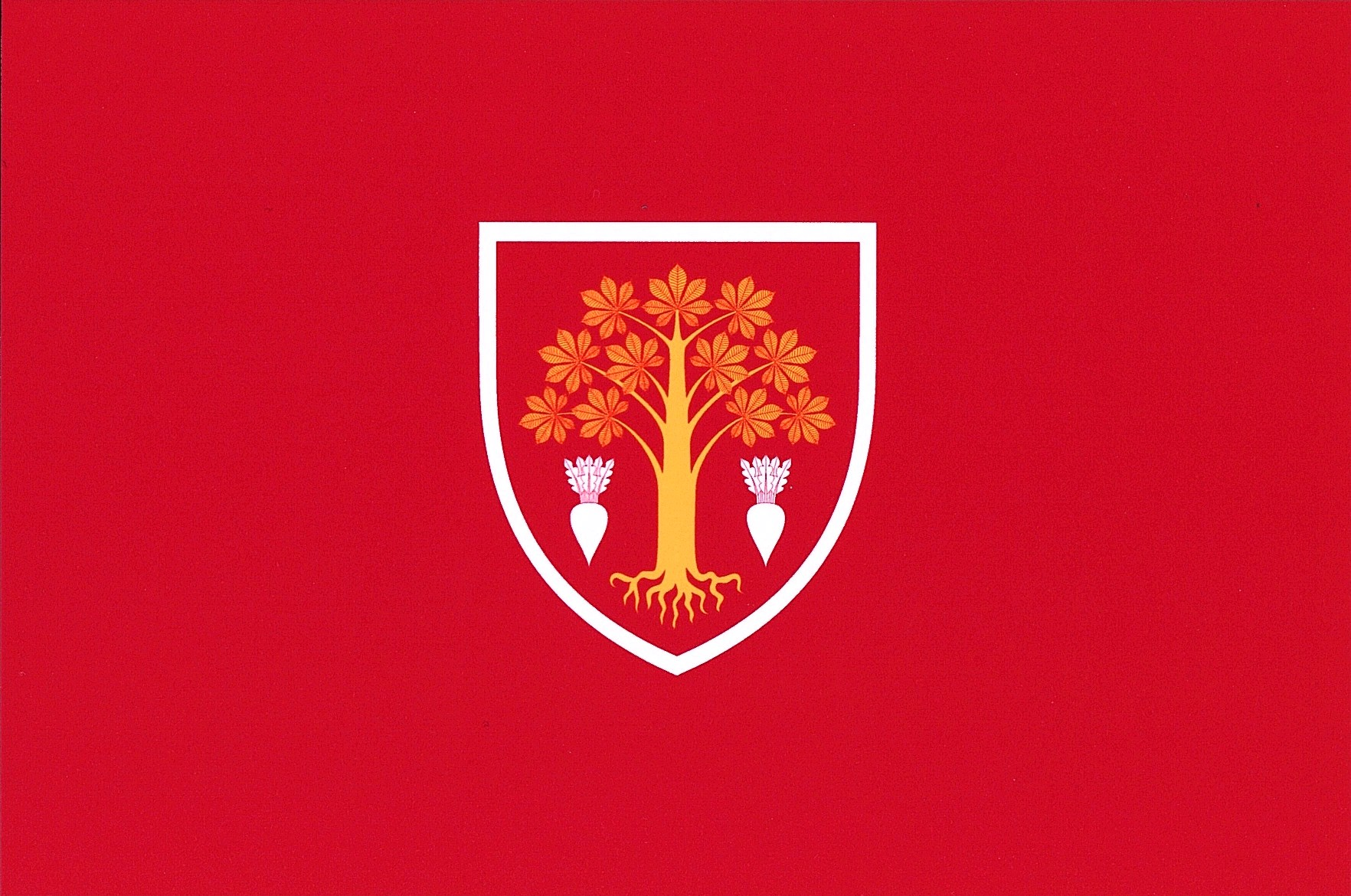
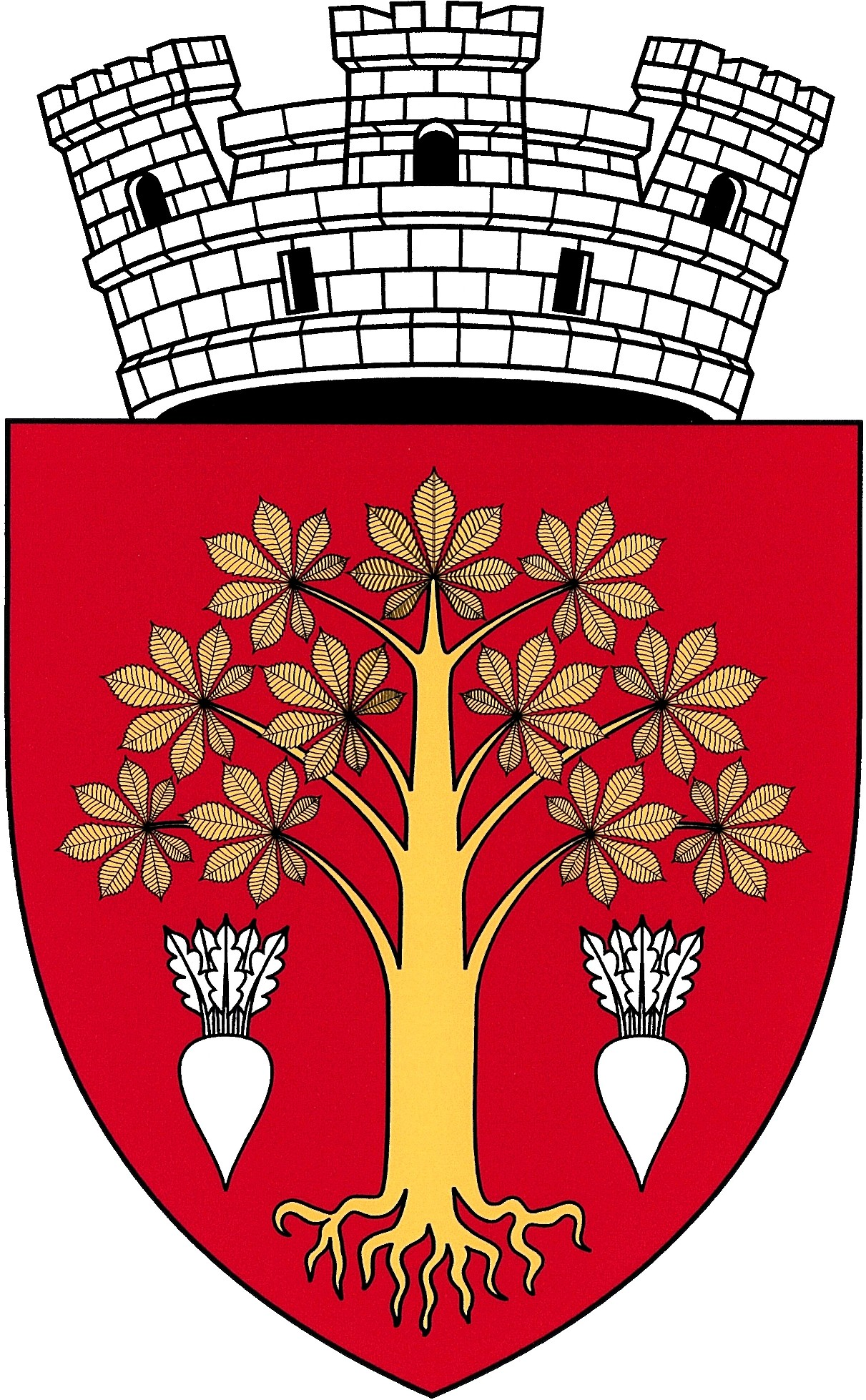
- Flag Coat of arms

- Location within Moldova
- Coordinates: 47°48′58″N 28°4′7″E
- Country: Moldova
- District: Sîngerei District

Government
  - Mayor: Maxim Gritunic (Ecological Green Party of Moldova) (PN)

Area
  - Total: 237 km^{2} (92 sq mi)
- Elevation: 97 m (318 ft)

Population (2014)
  - Total: 2,625
- Time zone: UTC+2 (EET)
  - Summer (DST): UTC+3 (EEST)
- Postal code: MD-6202
- Climate: Dfb

Biruința (Romanian pronunciation: [biruˈint͡sa]) is a town in Sîngerei District, Moldova.

The town is located 19 km (12 mi) from the district seat, Sîngerei, and 118 km (73 mi) from Chișinău.
