= Ghindești =

- Town
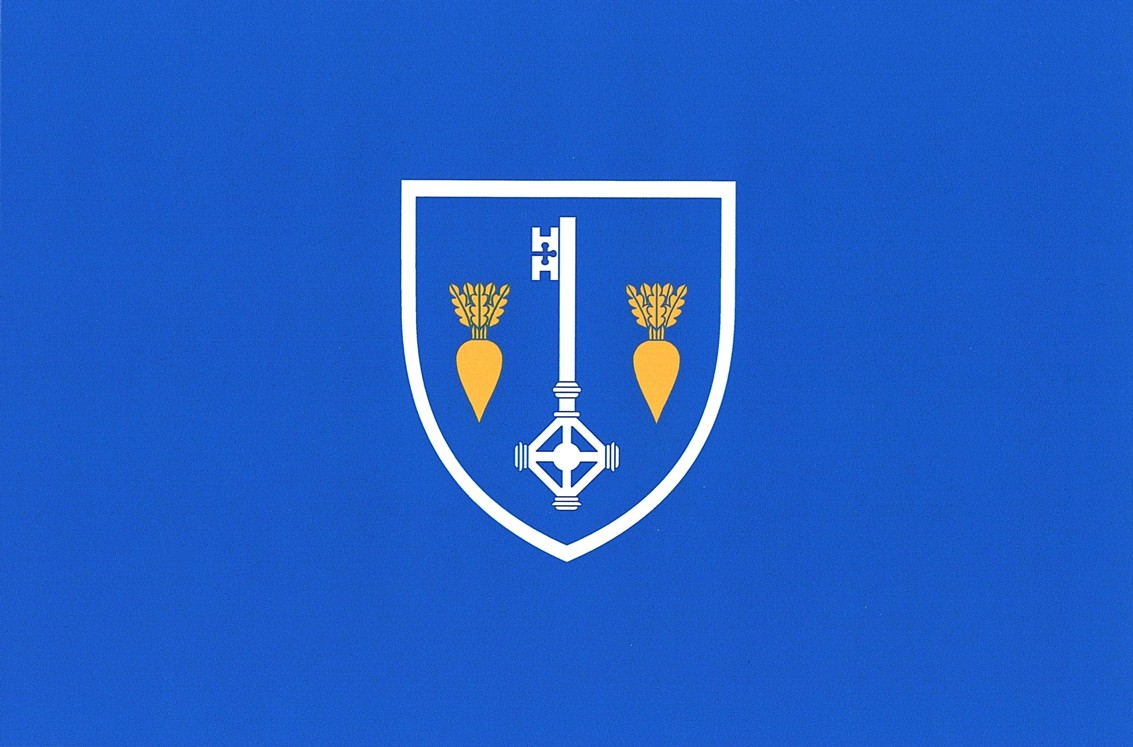
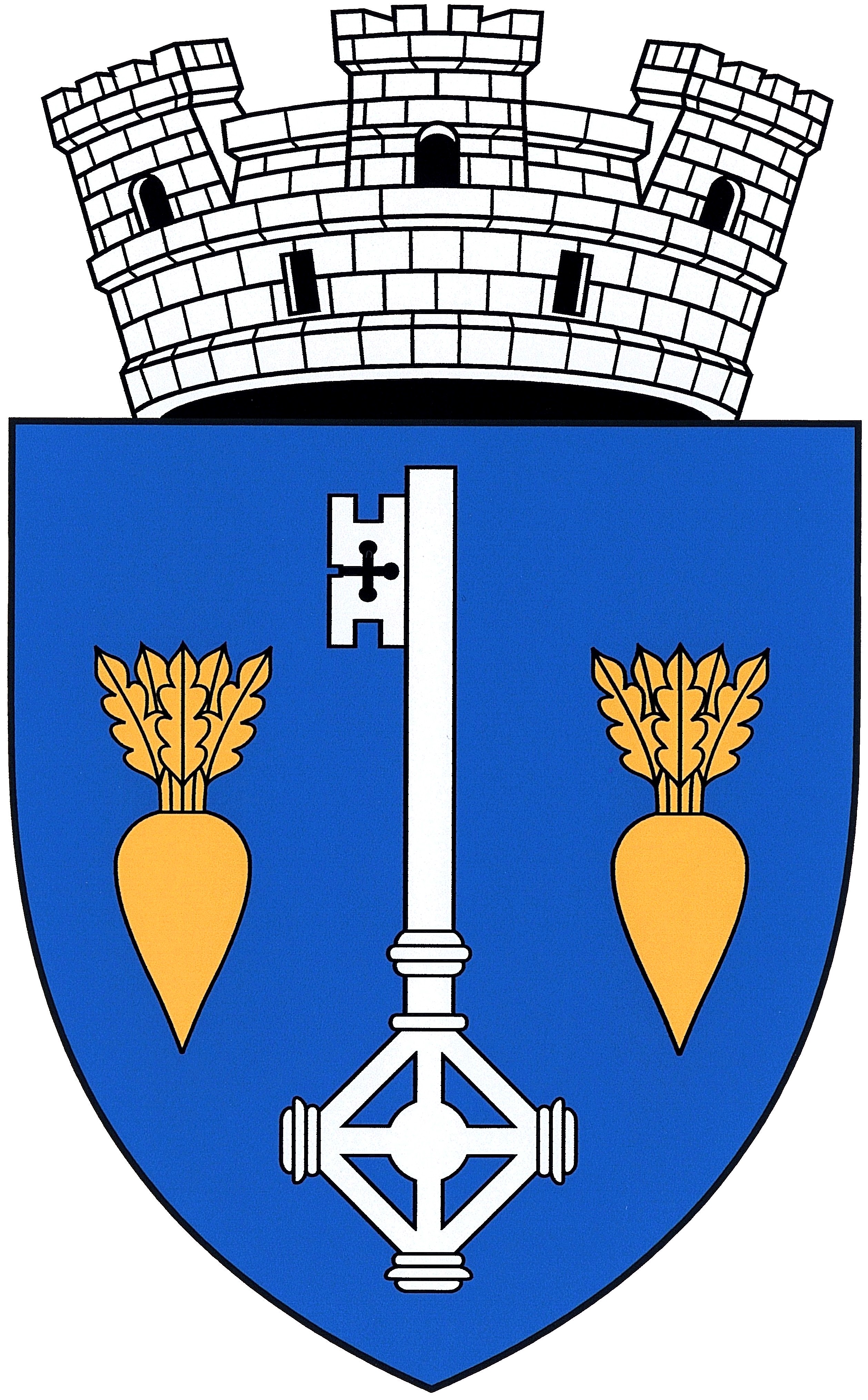
- Flag Seal

- Location within Moldova
- Coordinates: 47°51′28″N 28°22′58″E
- Country: Moldova
- District: Florești District

Government
  - Mayor: Mihail Bulat (2015; PDM)

Area
  - Total: 3.690 km^{2} (1.425 sq mi)
- Elevation: 90 m (300 ft)

Population (2014)
  - Total: 1,649
- Time zone: UTC+2 (EET)
  - Summer (DST): UTC+3 (EEST)

Ghindești (Romanian pronunciation: [ɡinˈdeʃtʲ]) is a city in Moldova. It is situated in Florești District in north eastern part of the country. Spread across an area of 3.690 km^{2} (1.425 sq mi), the town had a population of 1,649 inhabitants in 2014.

== Geography ==
Ghindești is located in Florești District in the north eastern part of Moldova. Spread across an area of 3.690 km^{2} (1.425 sq mi), it is one of 30 sub-divisions (Three cities and 27 communes) in the district. It is situated about 113 km (70 mi) from the Moldovian capital of Chișinău and 14 km (8.7 mi) from Floresti.

== Demographics ==
According to the 2014 census, the population of Cantemir was 1,649 inhabitants, a decrease compared to the previous census in 2004, when 1,841 inhabitants were registered. Of these, 761 were men and 888 were women. About 308 inhabitants were under the age of fourteen, and 217 inhabitants were above the age of 65 years. The entire population lived in urban areas. The town had an expatriate population of 130 individuals, all of whom belonged to the Commonwealth of Independent States. The population is further projected to reduce over the next few decades. The city had a Human Development Index of 0.699 in 2015.

Moldovans formed the major ethnic group (82.3%), with Ukrainians (8.1%) and Russians (7.2%) forming a significant minority. "Moldovan" (Romanian) was the most spoken language, spoken by 1,188 (74.2%) inhabitants, with Russian and Romanian (self-declared) spoken by significant minorities. About 98.2% of the population followed Eastern Orthodox Christianity.
