= Iargara =

- Town
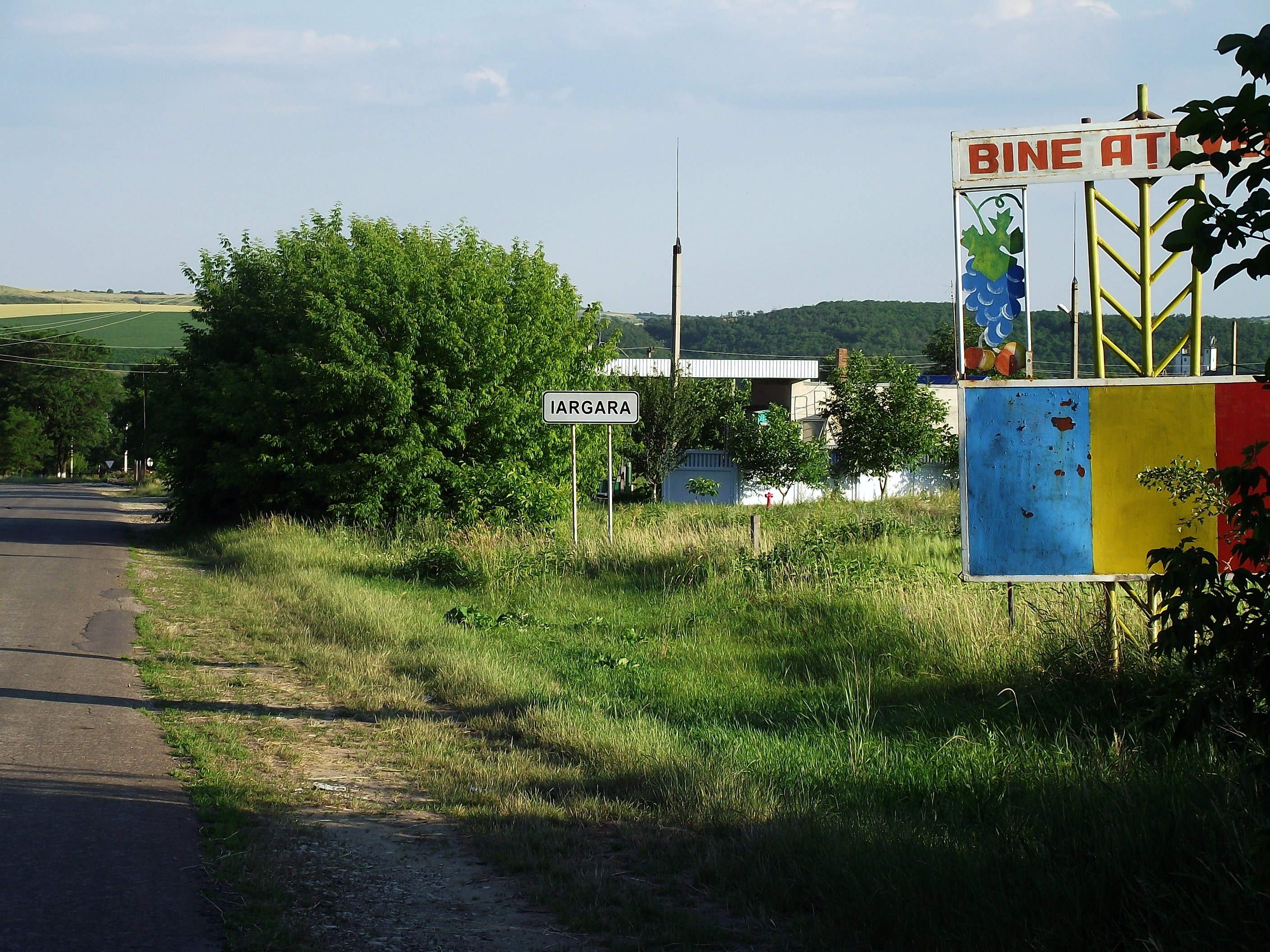
- Entrance sign, 2011

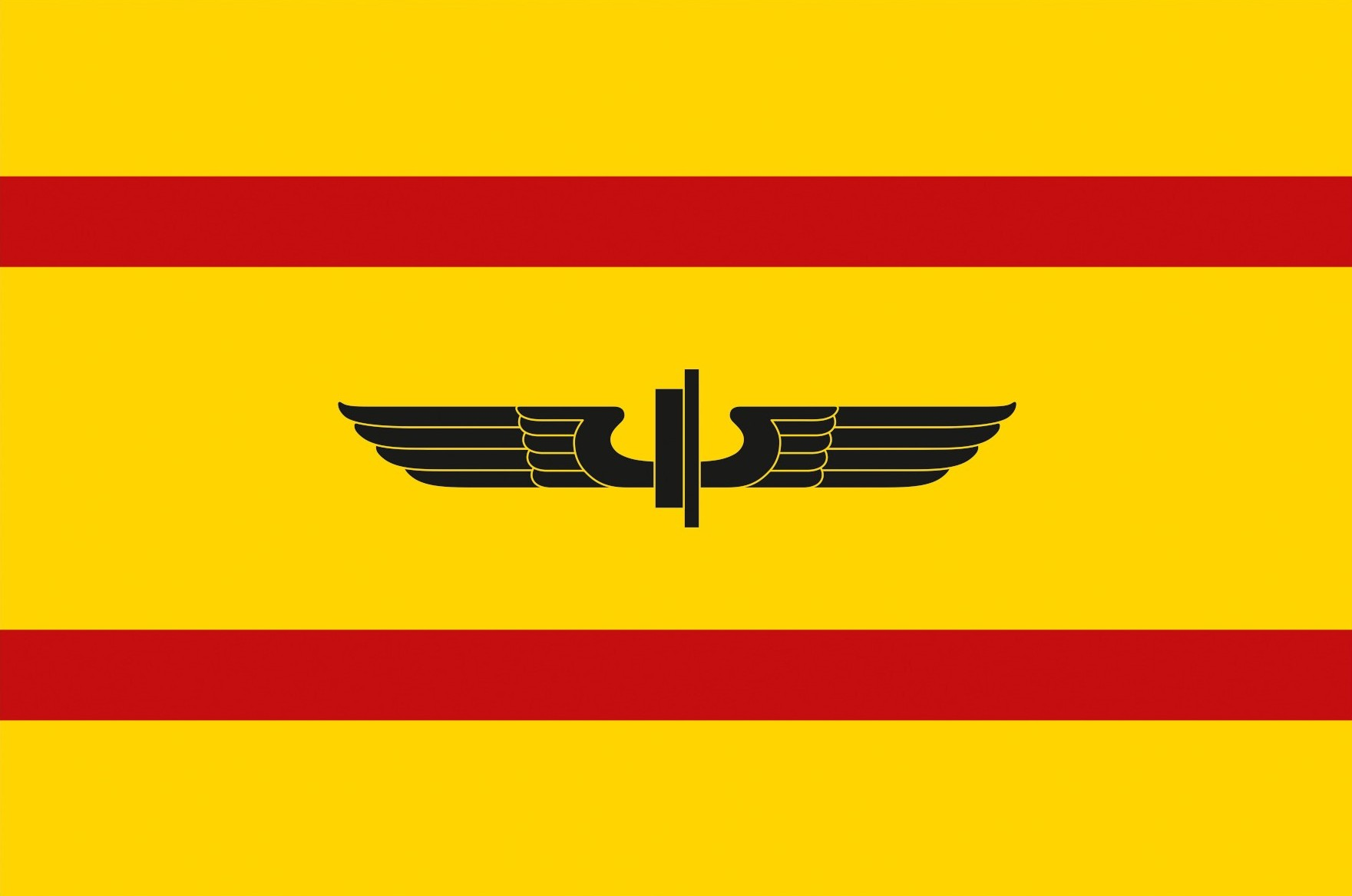
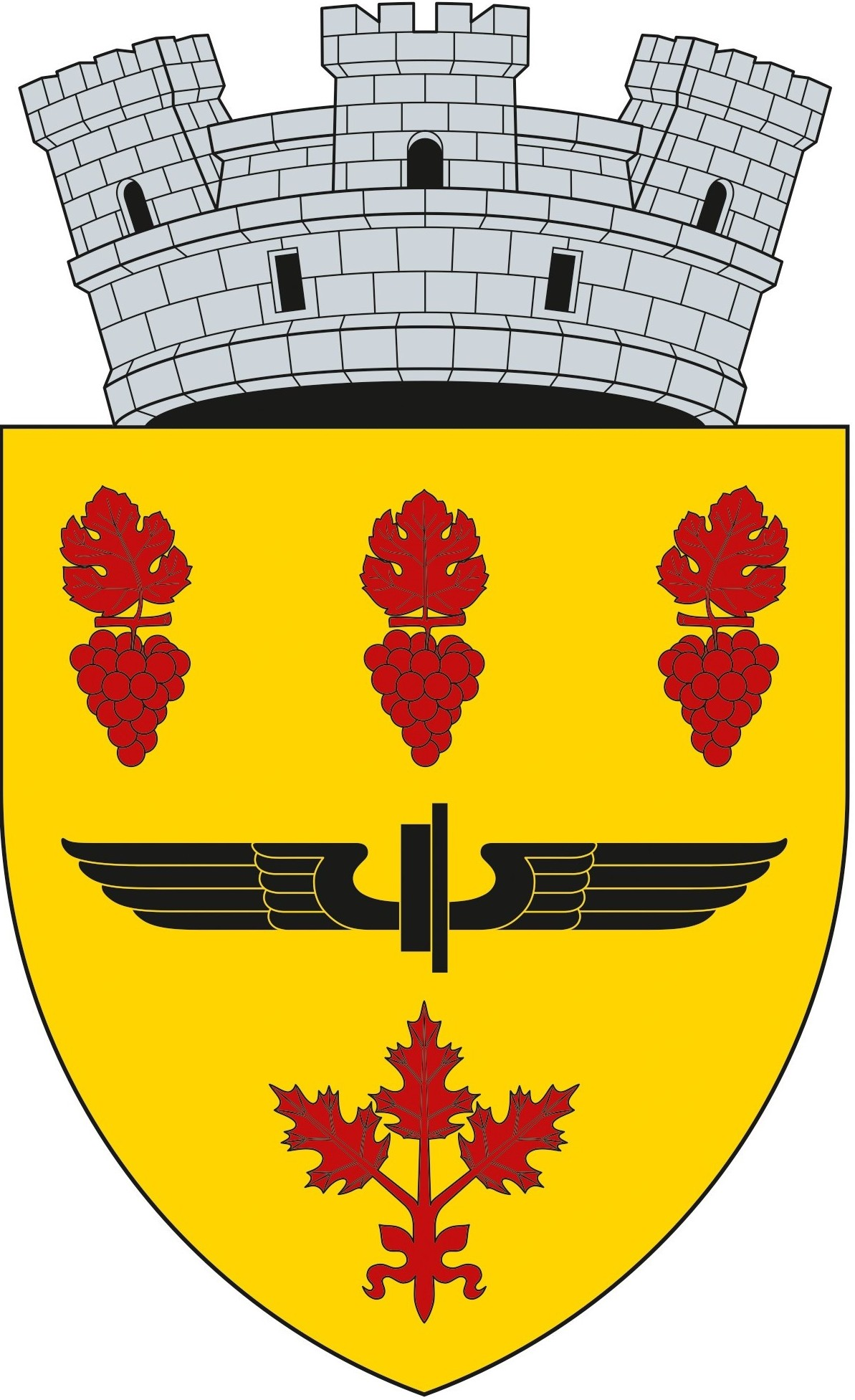
- Flag Coat of arms
- Interactive map of Iargara
- Location of Iargara in Moldova
- Country: Moldova
- District: Leova
- Elevation: 110 m (360 ft)

Population (2014)
  - Total: 3,957

Iargara is a town in Leova District, Moldova. One village, Meșeni, is administered by the town.

== International relations ==
=== Twin towns — Sister cities ===
Iargara is twinned with:

- Mizil, Romania
