= Crasnoe =

Crasnoe Красное Красне
- Town
- Location of Crasnoe in Moldova
- Country (de jure): Moldova
- Country (de facto): Transnistria (Note: Transnistria's political status is disputed. It considers itself to be an independent state, but this is not recognised by any UN member state. The Moldovan government and the international community consider Transnistria a part of Moldova's territory.)
- District of Transnistria: Slobozia District

Population (2014)
  - Total: 3,553

Crasnoe (Moldovan Cyrillic and Russian: Красное, romanized: Krasnoye, Ukrainian: Красне, romanized: Krasne) is an urban-type settlement (according to Transnistrian legislation) or town (according to Moldovan legislation) in the Slobozia District of Transnistria, Moldova. It is under the administration of the breakaway government of the Pridnestrovian Moldavian Republic.

According to the 2004 census, the population of the town was 2,981 inhabitants, of which 938 (31.46%) were Moldovans (Romanians), 845 (28.34%) Ukrainians and 1,045 (35.05%) Russians.
