= Codru, Moldova =

Suburb of Chișinău City, Moldova

Codru
- Town
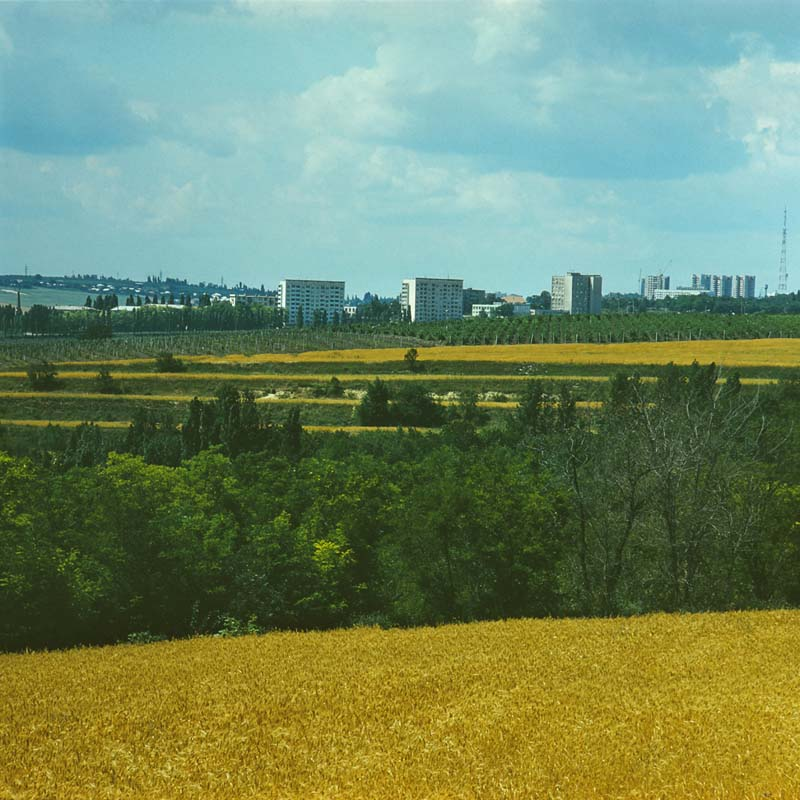

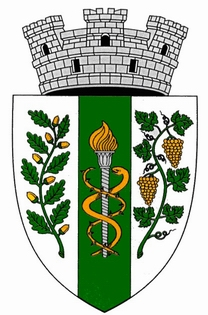
- Flag Coat of arms

- Location within Moldova
- Coordinates: 46°58′31″N 28°49′10″E
- Country: Moldova
- Municipality: Chișinău

Government
  - Mayor: Stelian Manic (PAS)

Area
  - Total: 29.45 km^{2} (11.37 sq mi)
- Elevation: 126 m (413 ft)

Population (2024)
  - Total: 18,310
- Time zone: UTC+2 (EET)
  - Summer (DST): UTC+3 (EEST)
- Website: Official website

Codru (Romanian pronunciation: [ˈkodru]) is a town in Chișinău municipality, Moldova, and the second-largest suburb of the capital after Durlești. It lies directly on the southwestern outskirts of Chișinău, separated from the city proper only by Grenoble Street. Codru is home to Costiujeni Psychiatric Hospital, a historic and prominent institution in Moldova.

== Demographics ==
According to the 2024 census, 18,310 inhabitants lived in Codru, an increase compared to the previous census in 2014, when 15,934 inhabitants were registered.

Ethnic composition of Codru (2024)
1. Moldovans (Note: There is an ongoing controversy regarding the ethnic identification of Moldovans and Romanians.) (68.1%)
2. Romanians (23.2%)
3. Ukrainians (3.70%)
4. Russians (2.80%)
5. Others (1.90%)
6. Not stated (0.30%)
Linguistic composition of Codru (2024)
1. Romanian (51.4%)
2. Moldovan (Note: In March 2023, the Parliament of Moldova passed a law updating all legislative texts and the constitution to refer to the national language as Romanian, effectively rendering the term "Moldovan" obsolete.) (33.6%)
3. Russian (11.7%)
4. Ukrainian (2.10%)
5. Other (1.10%)

Historical population
Year	Pop.	±%
1979	10,446	—
1989	11,716	+12.2%
2004	14,277	+21.9%
2014	15,934	+11.6%
2024	18,310	+14.9%

== Administration ==
The city is governed by a local council and a mayor, currently Stelian Manic of the Party of Action and Solidarity.

== Transport ==
Multiple public transport options operate within Codru. The city is served by two bus lines — the 14 and 15 buses of Chișinău Municipality — as well as several minibuses, most notably the 178 minibus line, which also covers a large area of Chișinău, particularly the city center.

== Costiujeni Psychiatric Hospital ==
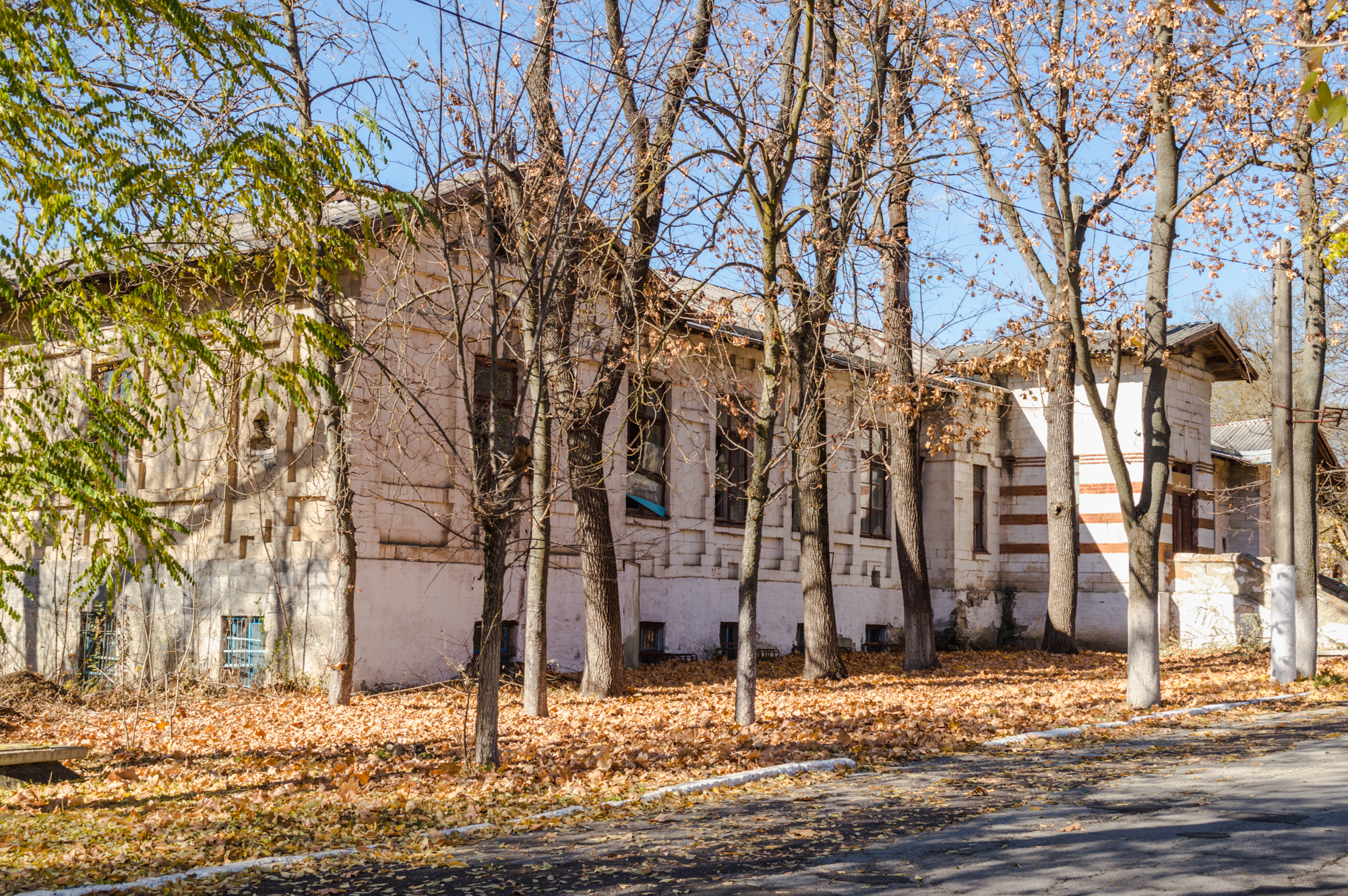
Part of the Costiujeni Psychiatric Hospital complex

According to a legend recounted by Irina Cantacuzino (1915–2007), during a heavy blizzard a wolf pack killed two children, Constantin (Kostea) and Eugene (Jenea), and their mother subsequently lost her mind and soon died. Their father became a monk and built a small monastic hermitage, which over time became known as “Kostea-Jenea.” In 1895, the clinical psychiatric hospital Costiujeni (now officially Chișinău Psychiatric Hospital) was founded nearby, soon to be recognized as one of the leading institutions of its kind in Eastern Europe.
