= Mărculești =

- Town
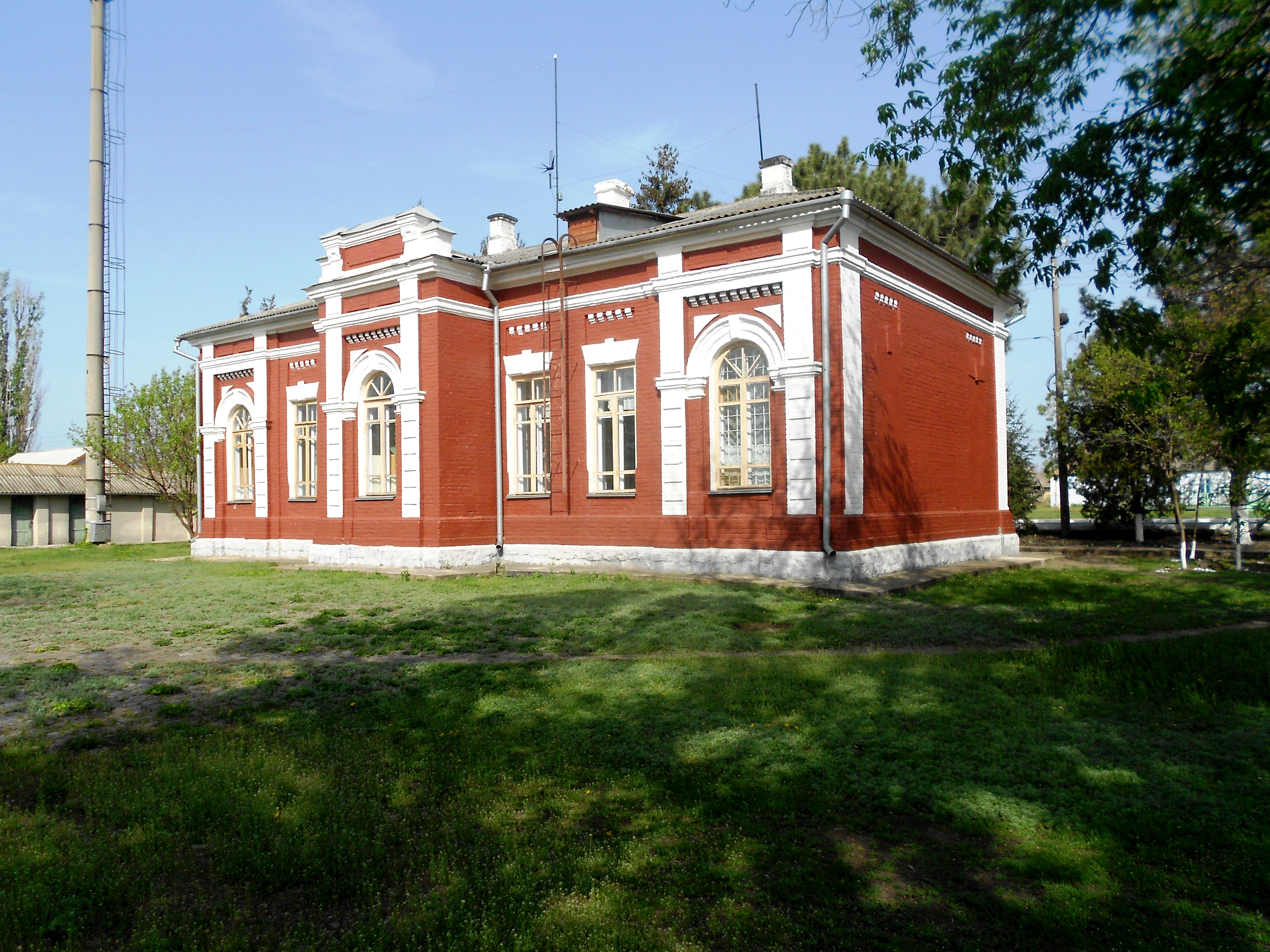
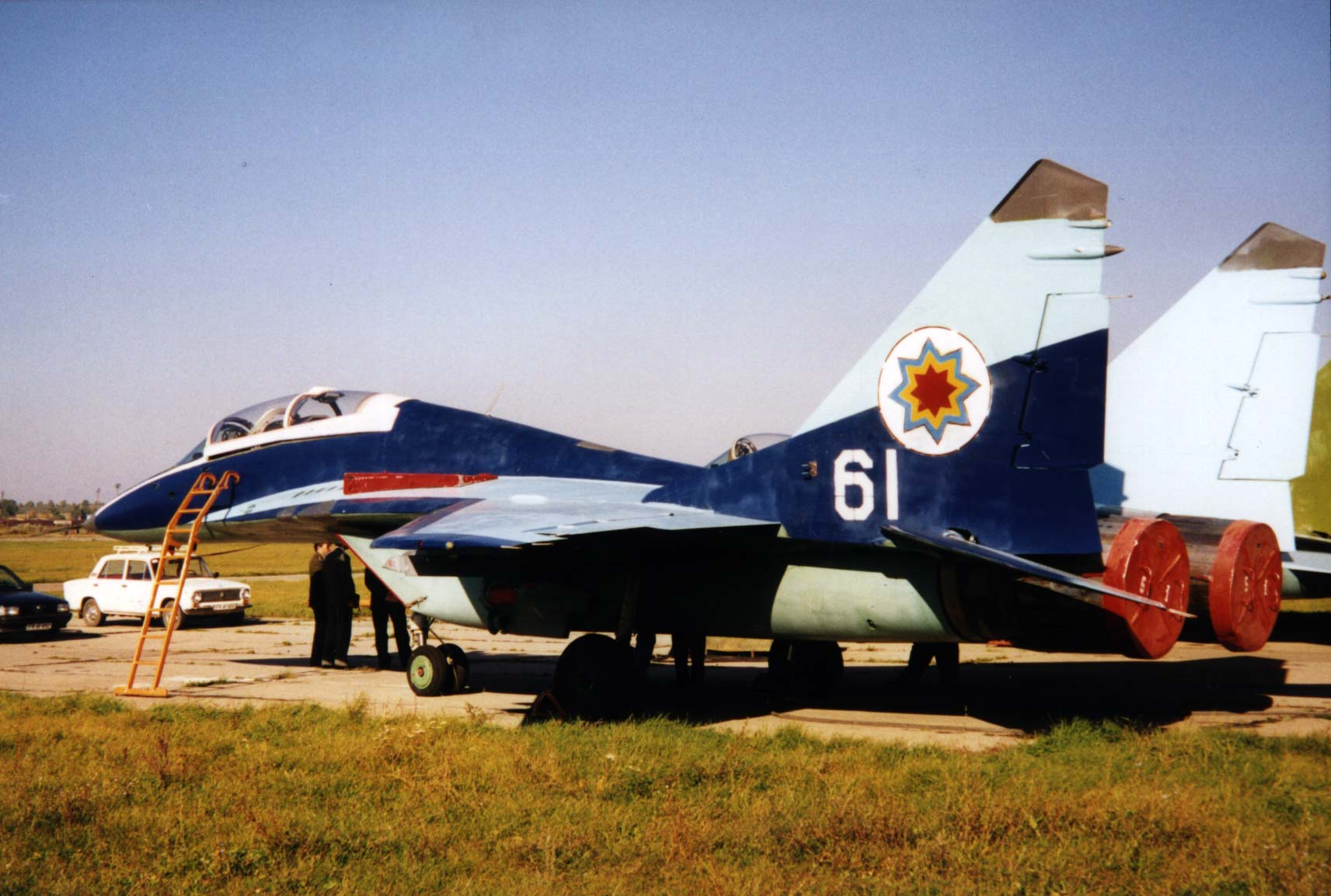
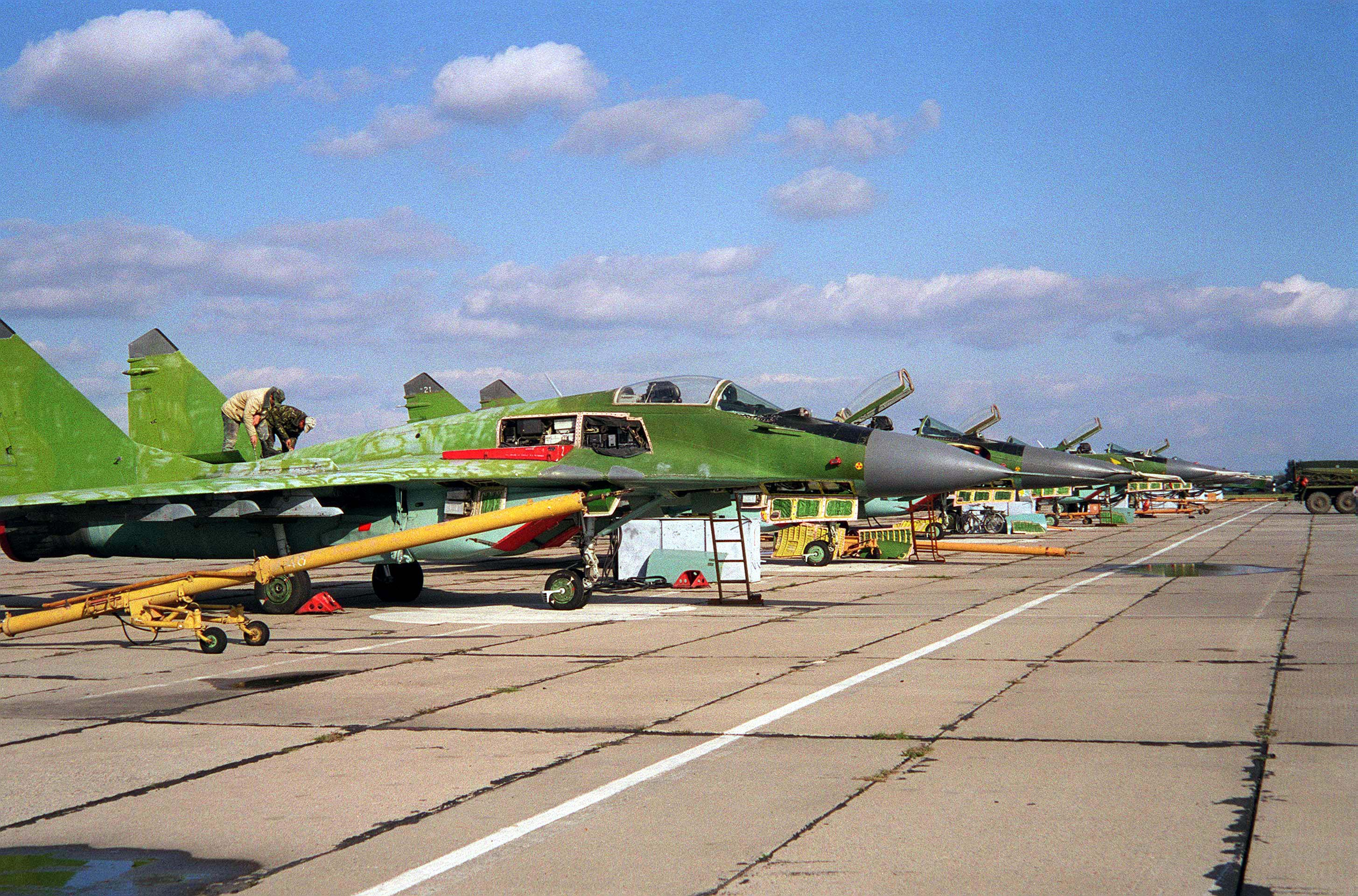
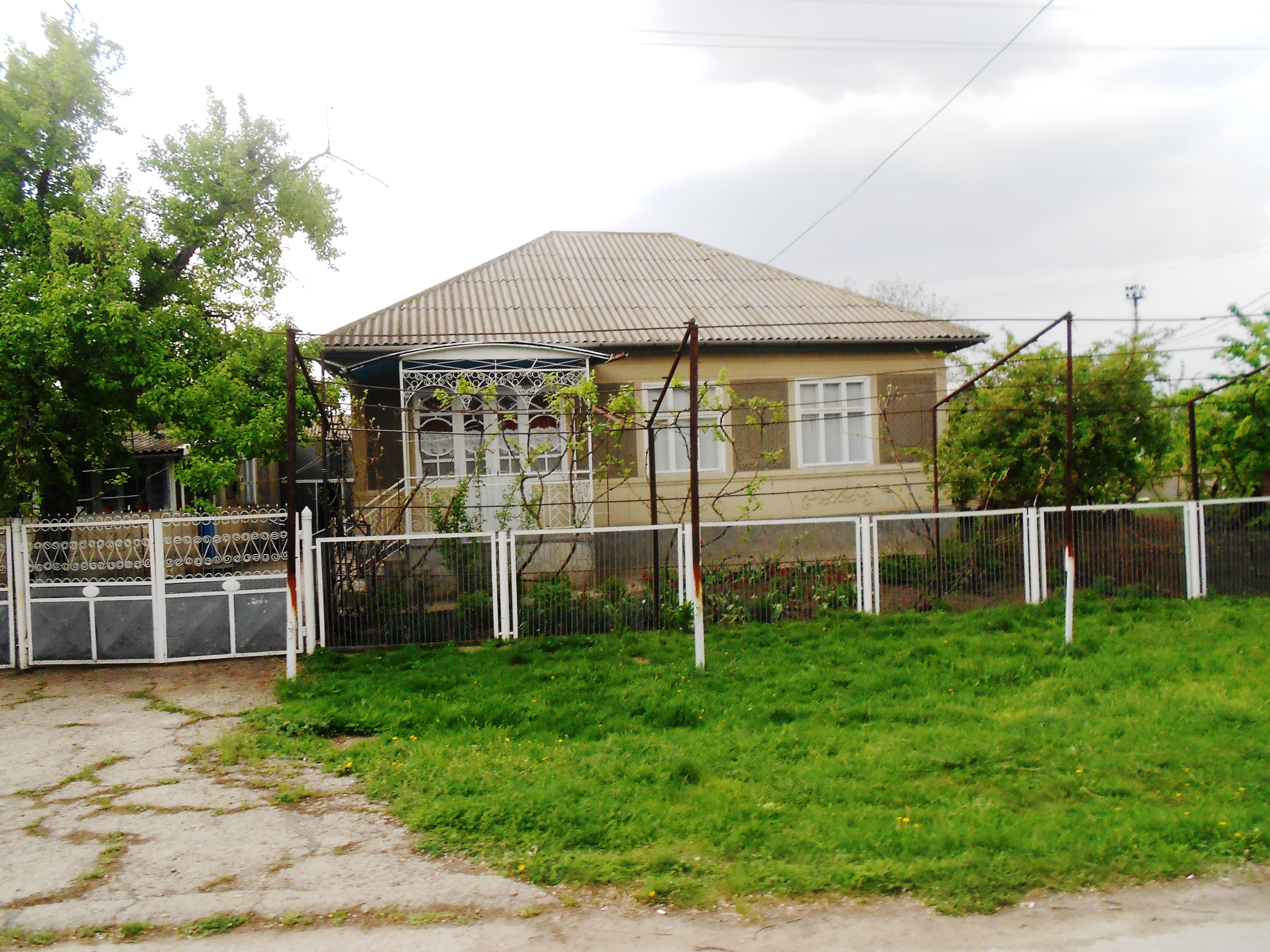
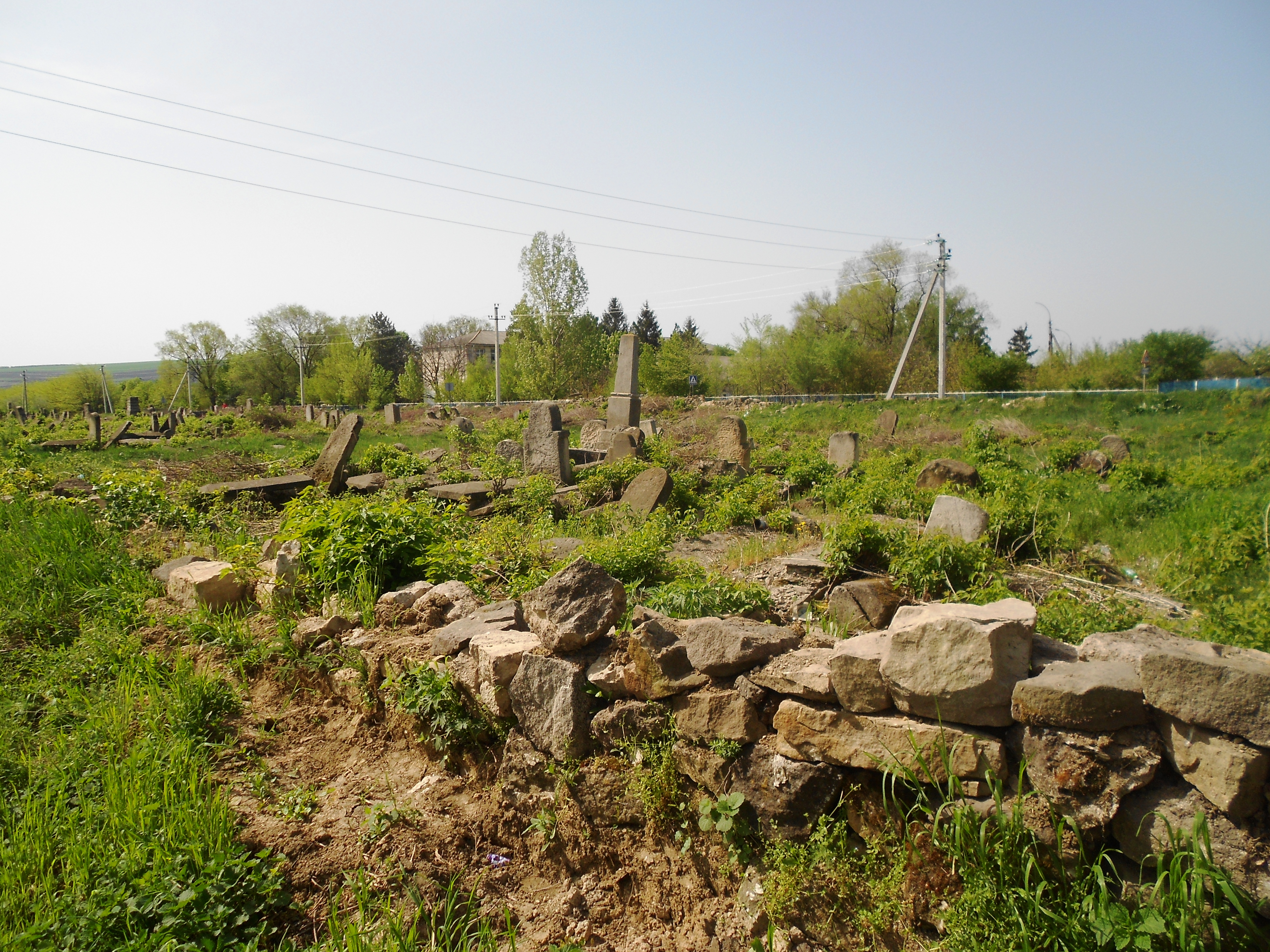

- Location within Moldova
- Coordinates: 47°52′7″N 28°14′51″E
- Country: Moldova
- District: Florești District

Government
  - Mayor: Ion Vîrlan (PCRM)

Area
  - Total: 5 km^{2} (1.9 sq mi)
- Elevation: 90 m (300 ft)

Population (2014)
  - Total: 1,396
- Time zone: UTC+2 (EET)
  - Summer (DST): UTC+3 (EEST)

Mărculești (Romanian pronunciation: [mərkuˈleʃtʲ]) is a city in Florești District, in northern Moldova, with a population of 2,081 at the 2004 census. The city was once the site of a Jewish agricultural and mercantile colony until its destruction in the Holocaust.

== In film and television ==
Filmmaker Matthew Mishory's 2015 documentary Absent was filmed in Mărculești, the site of a horrible atrocity in 1941 in which all of the village's Jews were massacred by the Romanian army. The film introduces the current residents of Mărculești, some of whom seem to be unaware (or unwilling to discuss) what happened. Mishory's own grandparents lived in the village, escaping to Israel just before the start of the Holocaust. In an interview with Tablet, Mishory discussed the complex emotions of filming there: "The history of Mărculești and the Holocaust pose impossible intellectual and theological questions. All I can say is that my feelings about what happened in Mărculești are complicated. I remain a practicing Jew. And I also have serious doubts about human nature. I'm angry that people who live overlooking a killing field lie about their history. But I also have a lot of empathy for the current residents of the village and their difficult circumstances". The film had its world premiere at the Astra Film Festival in Sibiu, Romania and led to efforts to preserve Mărculești's abandoned Jewish cemetery.
