= Sectorul Botanica =

Coordinates: 46°58′57″N 28°51′43″E

Botanica Sectorul Botanica
- Administrative Sector
- Botanica Sector
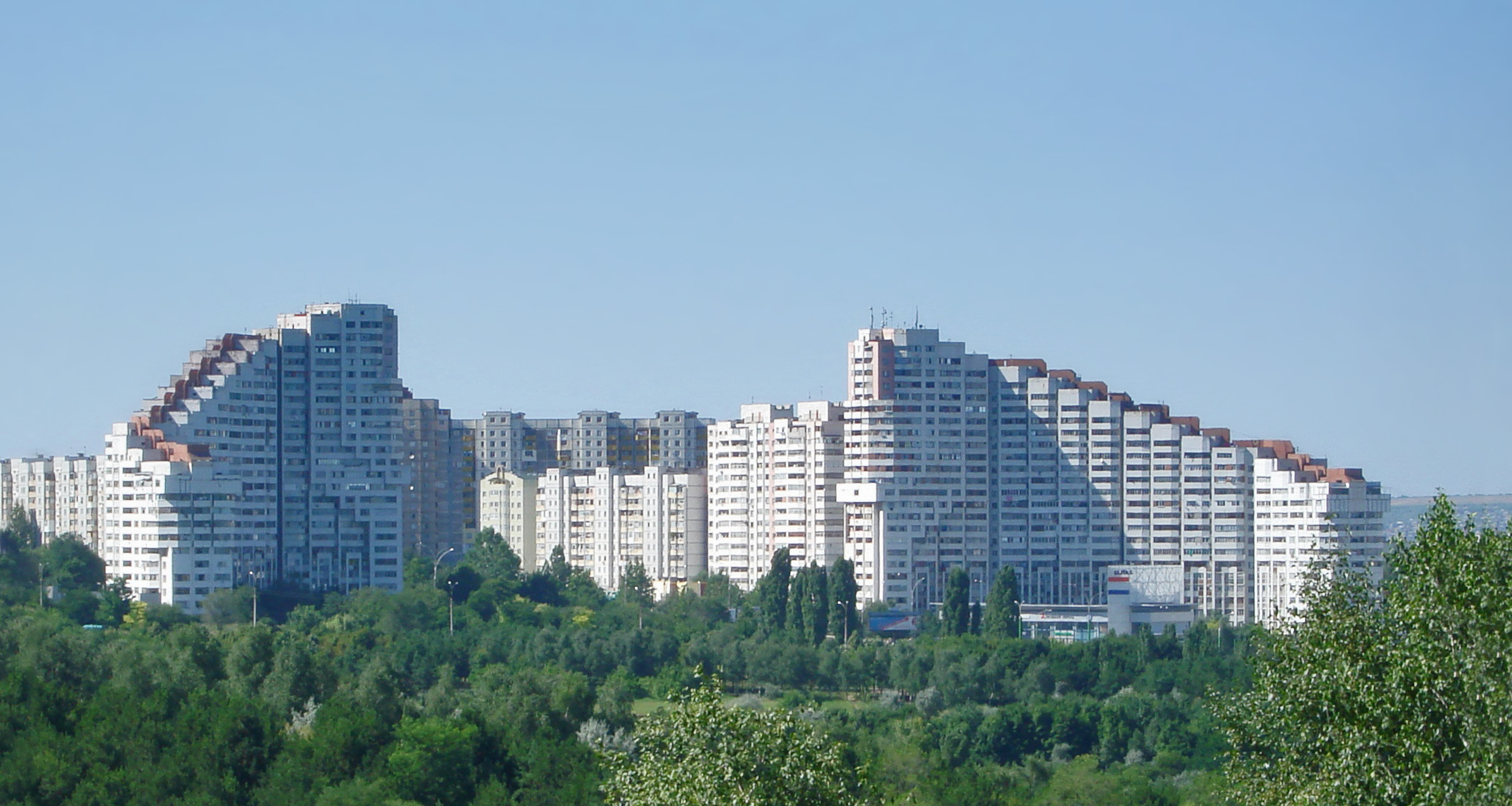

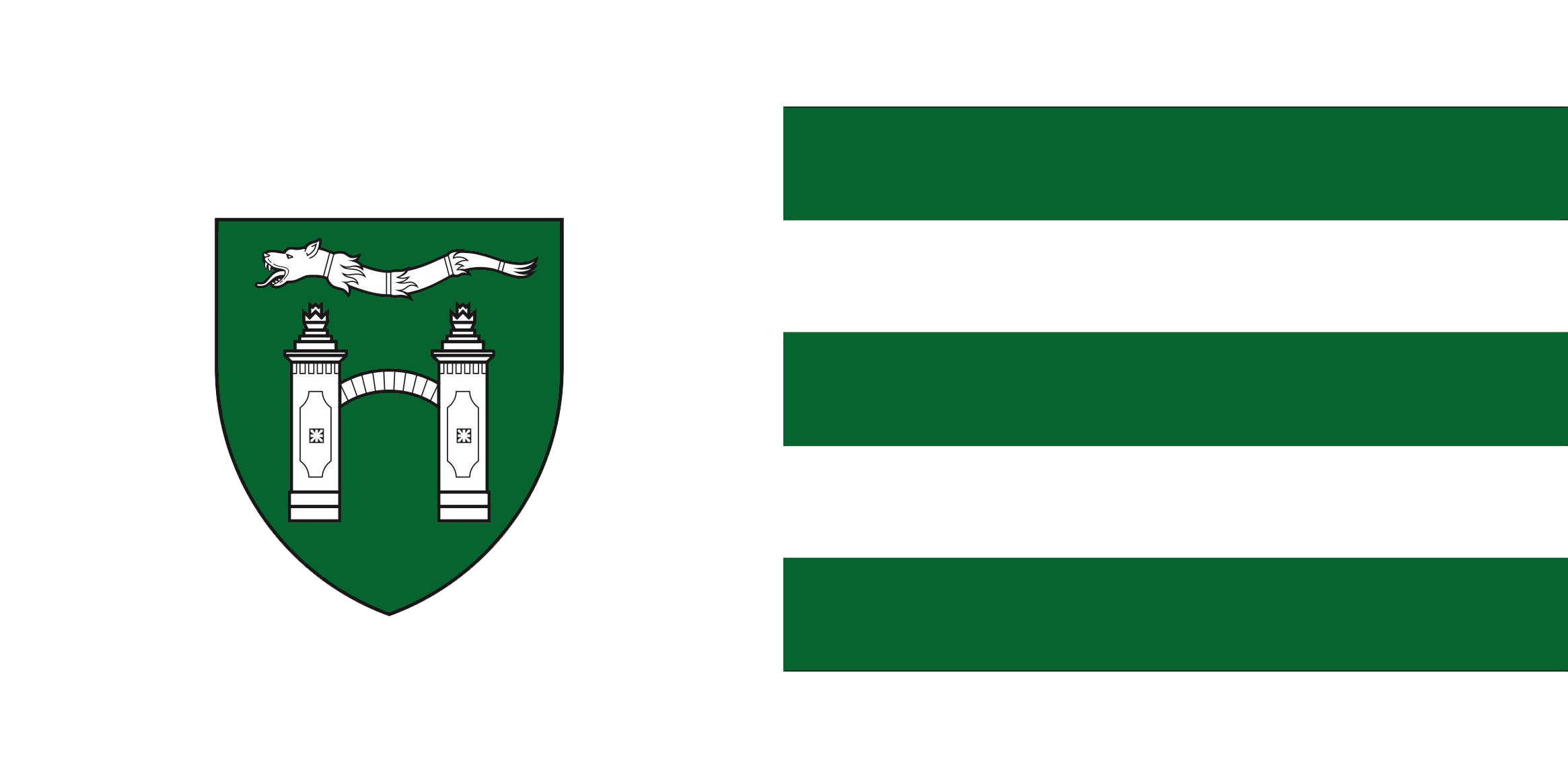
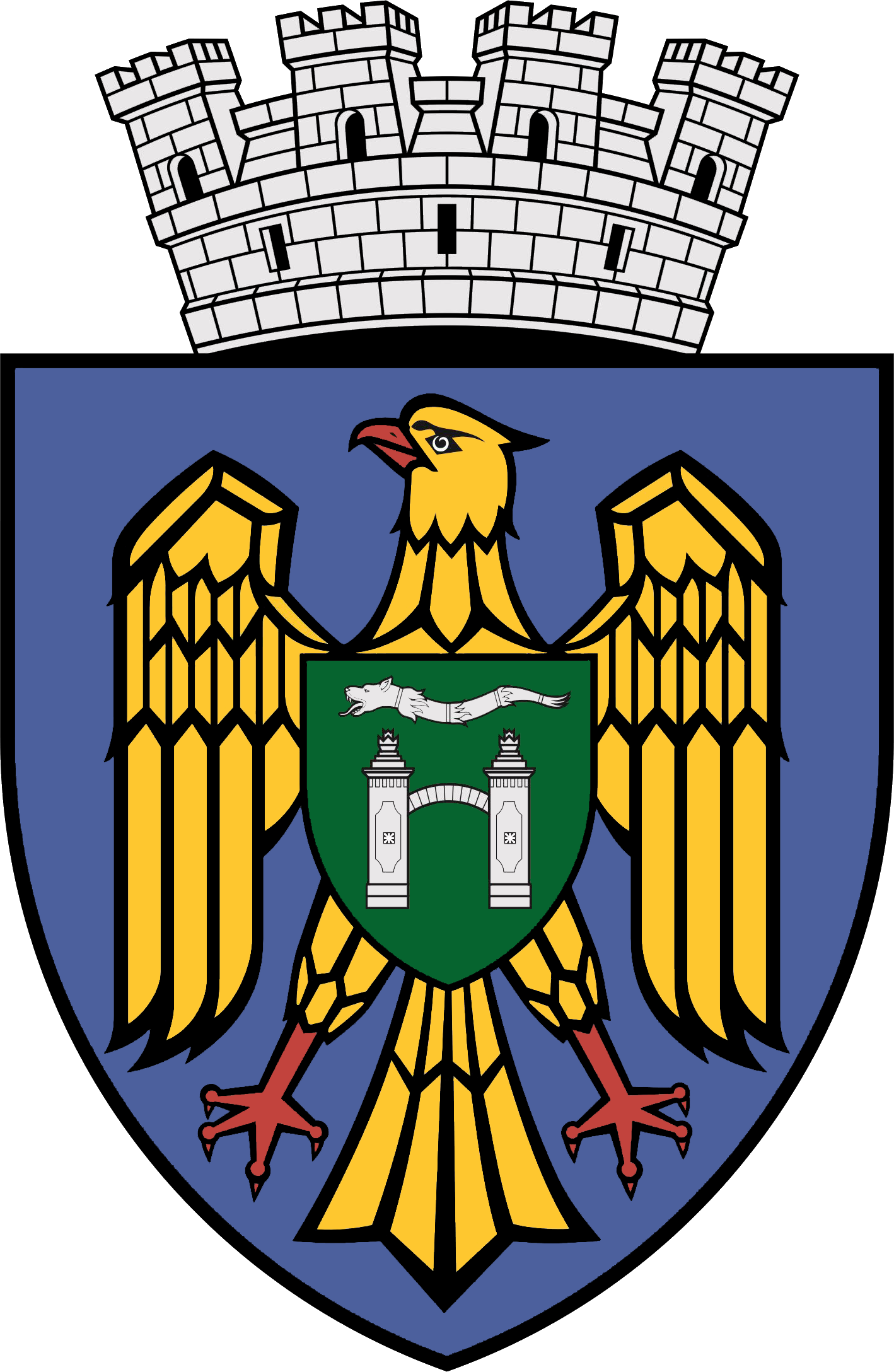
- Flag Coat of arms

- Founder: March 25, 1977

Government
  - Pretor: Diana Guba

Area
  - Total: 158.7 km^{2} (61.3 sq mi)

Population (2014)
  - Total: 220.000
- Time zone: UTC+2 (EET)
  - Summer (DST): UTC+3 (EEST)
- Website: https://botanica.md/

Sectorul Botanica (Romanian pronunciation: [boˈtanika]) is one of the five sectors in Chișinău, the capital of Moldova. Botanica is the most populous (220,000 people) and one of the more scenic districts in Chișinău; it hosts a zoo and a botanical garden. The widest boulevard in Chișinău–Dacia blvd. and the highest buildings also are located in Botanica district. The local administration is managed by a pretor appointed by the city administration. It governs over a portion of the city of Chișinău itself (the southern part), the town of Sîngera, and the commune of Băcioi. The Chișinău International Airport also is located within Botanica district. The density of Russians and Ukrainians is little higher than on other districts of Chișinău.

Outside Botanica itself there is housing for displaced persons and asylum seekers, provided by UNDP.

Botanica is easily accessible from the rest of the city and hosts many shopping facilities, like Shopping MallDova, Jumbo shopping centre, Elat, Plaza and Metro.

In Botanica is located the second stadium by capacity from Moldova, Zimbru Stadium.

Sîngera (town)

Dobrogea
Revaca

Băcioi (commune)

Brăila
Frumușica
Străisteni
