= Vatra, Moldova =

Vatra
- Town
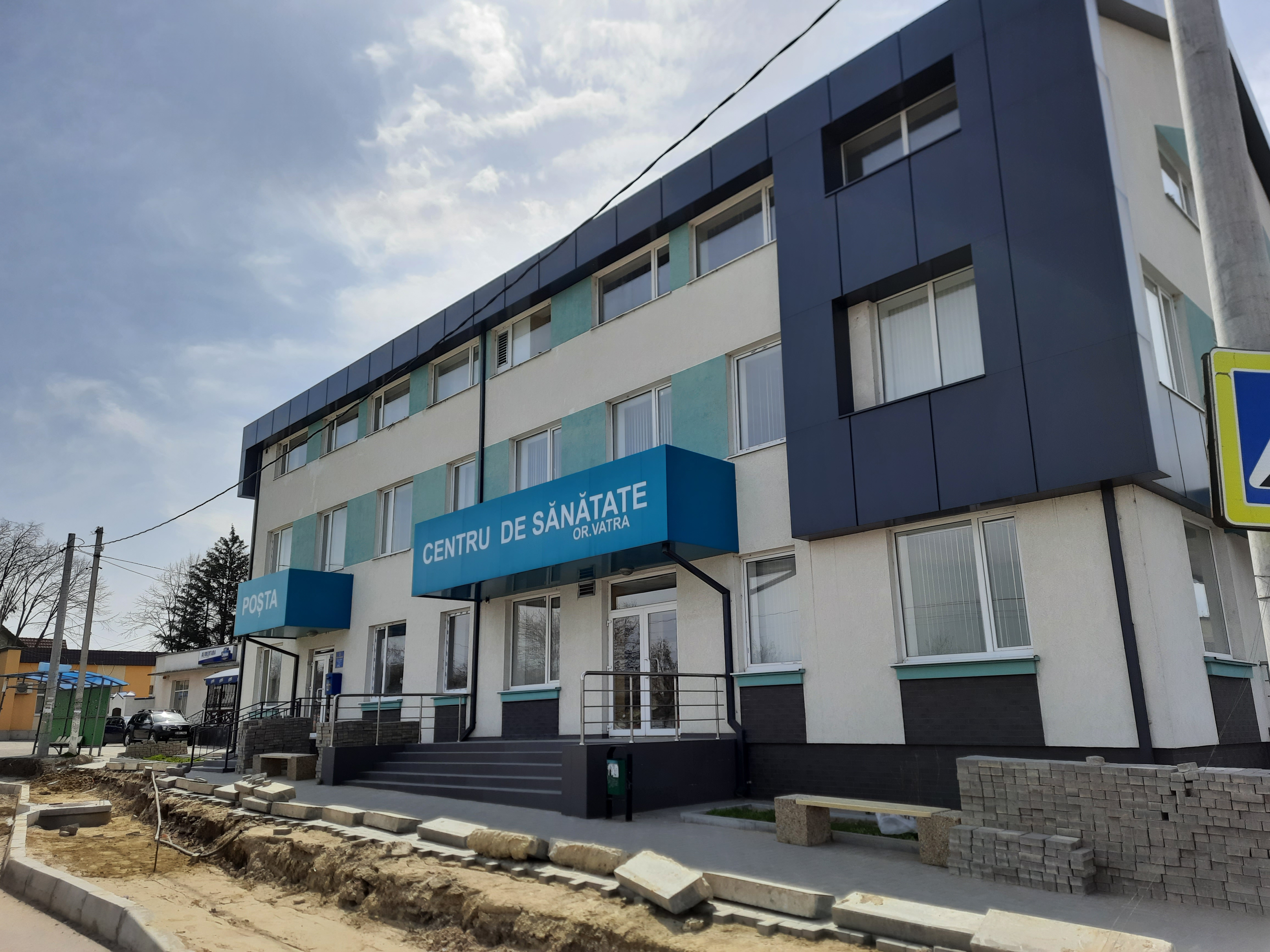
- Health center and post office

- Location within Moldova
- Coordinates: 47°04′26″N 28°44′06″E
- Country: Moldova
- Municipality: Chișinău

Government
  - Mayor: Denis Danila (MAN)
- Elevation: 70 m (230 ft)

Population (2024)
  - Total: 3,391
- Time zone: UTC+2 (EET)
  - Summer (DST): UTC+3 (EEST)
- Postal code: MD-2055
- Website: Official website

Vatra (Romanian pronunciation: [ˈvatrə]) is a town in Chișinău municipality, Moldova, located about 6 km north‑west of the capital and covering roughly 8 km². It gained city status in the early 1990s.

== Economy and Infrastructure ==
Vatra has a kindergarten, a high school with Romanian and Russian instruction, a local clinic, and several enterprises including the Vatra stone quarry, marble processing, and alcoholic beverage production. The town is crossed by the national R1 (E58) road, which connects Chișinău to the country’s western districts. North of the Vatra railway station lies the protected 'Cazacu' Quarry area.

During the Soviet era, a bus line linked the town to the capital, and plans were made for a metro connecting Chișinău International Airport with Vatra. The town celebrates its patronal feast on October 14, like Chișinău, and offers recreational areas along the artificial Ghidighici Reservoir, created on the Bâc River floodplain in the 1960s–1970s.

== Demographics ==
According to the 2024 census, 3,391 inhabitants lived in Vatra, a decrease compared to the previous census in 2014, when 3,457 inhabitants were registered.

Ethnic composition of Vatra (2024)
1. Moldovans (Note: There is an ongoing controversy regarding the ethnic identification of Moldovans and Romanians.) (70.1%)
2. Romanians (13.9%)
3. Russians (6.80%)
4. Ukrainians (4.40%)
5. Romani (1.50%)
6. Others (2.40%)
7. Not stated (0.90%)
Linguistic composition of Vatra (2024)
1. Romanian (40.3%)
2. Moldovan (Note: In March 2023, the Parliament of Moldova passed a law updating all legislative texts and the constitution to refer to the national language as Romanian, effectively rendering the term "Moldovan" obsolete.) (35.8%)
3. Russian (19.2%)
4. Ukrainian (2.10%)
5. Romani (1.20%)
6. Other (0.90%)
7. Not stated (0.40%)

Historical population
Year	Pop.	±%
1970	2,238	—
1979	3,368	+50.5%
1989	3,676	+9.1%
2004	3,296	−10.3%
2014	3,457	+4.9%
2024	3,391	−1.9%
