= Sîngerei District =

District in Moldova

Coordinates: 47°40′N 28°10′E

Sîngerei
- District (Raion)
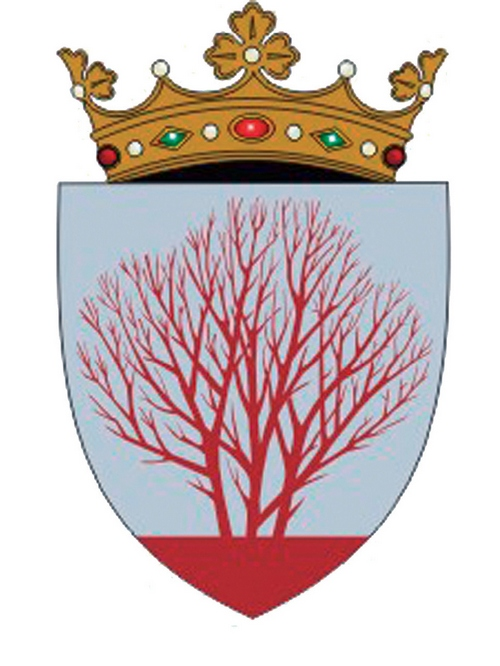
- Flag Coat of arms

- Country: Republic of Moldova
- Administrative center (Oraş-reşedinţă): Sîngerei
- Established: 2002

Government
  - Raion president: Cristian Cainarian (PAS, 2023)

Area
  - Total: 1,033.7 km^{2} (399.1 sq mi)

Population (2024)
  - Total: 55,933
  - Density: 54.110/km^{2} (140.14/sq mi)
- Time zone: UTC+2 (EET)
  - Summer (DST): UTC+3 (EEST)
- Area code: +373 62
- Car plates: SG
- Website: singerei.md

Sîngerei (Romanian pronunciation: [sɨndʒerej]) is a district (Romanian: raion) in the north of Moldova, with the administrative center at Sîngerei. The other major city is Biruința. In the 2024 Moldovan census, its population was 55,933.

Between 1944 and 1991, Sîngerei district was called Lazovsky District.

== History ==
Localities with the earliest documentary attestation are Coşcodeni, Drăgăneşti, Tăura Veche, these being attested for the first time during 1508–1536. District administrative center Sîngerei is first documented on 17 May 1586. In the following centuries there is a development of trade, culture and an important increase in population. In 1812 the Treaty of Bucharest, Basarabia is occupied by the Russian Empire for a period of a century (1812–1917). After the collapse of the Russian Empire in 1917, in 1918 Basarabia decide union with the motherland Romania, so the region today forming part of the Bălți County (1918–1944). Is again occupied Basarabia in 1940 after the Molotov–Ribbentrop Treaty, this time the USSR. The territorial-administrative, certified as the district Lazovsky District (Sîngerei), was established on 11 November 1940 following a decision by the Supreme Soviet of the Moldavian SSR, a few months after Russian troops entered the area between the Prut and Nistru. Initially, the entering only a part of current locations, the other belonging Chișcăreni district, which later merged Singerei district. In 1991 as a result of the proclamation of Independence of Moldova, part of the Bălți County (1991–2003), and in 2003 became administrative unit of Moldova.

== Geography ==
Singerei district is located in the north of Moldova has neighborhood the Drochia District in north, east Floreşti District, Ungheni District in the southwest district, Teleneşti District south, west Făleşti District and Bălți municipality in northwest. Geographically, it situated in Balti steppe and is a hilly plain. Erosion process with low intensity. Maximum altitude between 190–240 meters in district.

=== Climate ===
District has a temperate-continental climate with an increase in summer (21.0–21.5 °C) and winter (−4.5–5.0 °C). 450–550 mm annual amount of precipitation. Average wind speed 3–5 m/s.

=== Fauna ===
Mainly steppe fauna is represented by: hare, hedgehog, fox, deer, wild boar, raccoon dog, badger, wolf and red deer. Of birds there are: stork, egrets, quail, heron, steppe eagle, crow, nightingale and others.

=== Flora ===
Forests occupy 10.9% of the district and there are: oak, ash, hornbeam, hazel, acacia and other trees. Plants include: fescue, bells, clover, knotweed, mugwort and others.

=== Rivers ===
District is located in the Nistru river basin, crosses the river Răut (286 km) the largest tributary of the Nistru, with its tributaries: Soloneţ, Ciulcul de Mijloc, Cubolta (102 km). Most lakes are of natural origin, but are rich in fish.

== Administrative subdivisions ==
- Localities: 70
  - Administrative center: Sîngerei
    - Cities: Biruința, Sîngerei
      - Communes: 24
        - Villages: 44

See Cities and communes in Sîngerei District.

== Demographics ==
In the 2024 Census, the district population was 55,933 of which 21% urban and 79% rural population.

=== Ethnic groups ===
Ethnic group	% of total
Moldovans *	88.1
Ukrainians	4.9
Romanians *	4.2
Russians	2.3
Gagauz	0.1
Romani	0.1
Other	0.2
Undeclared	0.1

Footnote: * There is an ongoing controversy regarding the ethnic identification of Moldovans and Romanians.

=== Religion ===
- Christians – 99%
  - Orthodox Christians – 90.4%
  - Protestant – 7.1%
  - Old Believers - 1.2%
  - Catholics – 0.3%
- Other – 0.1%
- No Religion – 0.4%
- Not Declared - 0.5%

== Economy ==
In the district are registered, a total of 6525 companies. The share of agricultural land is 54,981 ha (53.2%) total land area. Arable land occupies 49 757 ha (48.2%) of the total agricultural land, orchards plantations – 2901 ha (2.8%), vineyards occupy 1249 ha (1.2%), pastures – 19,020 ha (18.4%), other – 2658 ha (2.6%). Agriculture is the main branch of economy grow: cereals (wheat, barley, oats), vegetables, tobacco, sunflower, sugar beet, in orchards: apple, plum, pear, cherry and others.

== Education ==
The district Singerei working 53 educational institutions, including schools – 10, secondary schools – 1, gymnasium – 33 primary schools – 6, special schools – one, polyvalent vocational schools – 2.

== Politics ==
Singerei district is a district with a percentage of centre-right party present here AEI usually get positive results, and PCRM are in a continuous fall. During 2001–2009, the district was a predominantly communist (over 50%).

During the last three elections AEI had an increase of 101.9%

Parliament elections results
Year	AEI	PCRM
2010	55.30% 21,279	38.31% 14,744
July 2009	52.60% 19,159	43.43% 15,598
April 2009	29.39% 10,539	54.77% 19,640

=== Elections ===
Summary of 28 November 2010 Parliament of Moldova election results in Singerei District
Parties and coalitions	Votes	%	+/−
Party of Communists of the Republic of Moldova	14,744	38.31	−5.12
Liberal Democratic Party of Moldova	11,037	28.68	+11.71
Democratic Party of Moldova	7,399	19.23	-0.86
Liberal Party	2,071	5.38	−3.98
Party Alliance Our Moldova	772	2.01	−4.17
European Action Movement	772	2.01	+2.01
Other Party	1,701	4.38	+0.41
Total (turnout 57.37%)	38,814	100.00	

== Culture ==
Working in the district Singerei: 180 artistic groups, 21 bands holding the title of the band model, public libraries – 48, houses of culture – 48.

== Health ==
The district Singerei works: Singerei district hospital with general fund of 280 beds, a center of family doctors in the composition of which are 17 family physician offices, nine health centers, 30 health points.

== Personalities ==
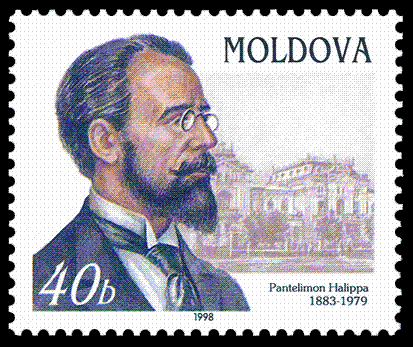
Pan Halippa on stamp

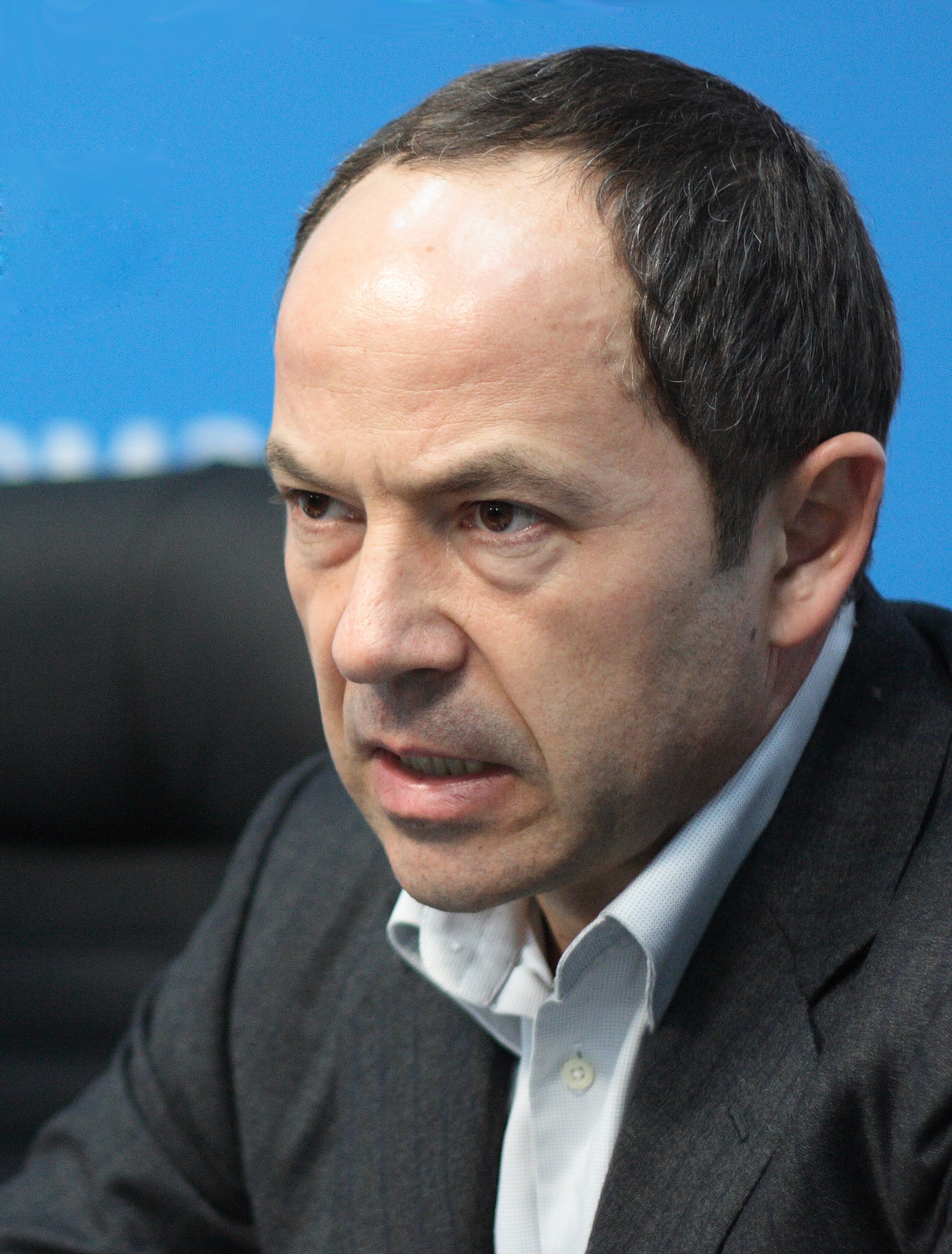
Sergei Tigipko

- Anton Crihan – Lawyer, economist, politician and publicist, in 1949 emigrated to United States
- Ion Hadârcă – Poet, politician (Liberal Party), member of Moldavian Parliament between 1990–1998 and 2009–present
- Gheorghe Duca – Scientist, president of the Academy of Sciences of Moldova
- Pan Halippa – Publicist and politician, president of Sfatul Țării, which voted the union in 1918
- Sergei Tigipko – Ukrainian politician, finance specialist, former Vice-Prime Minister of Ukraine and Minister of Economics of Ukraine
- Sergiu Grossu – Writer and theologian
- Vasile Gafencu – Basarabian politician, member of the Sfatul Țării (1917–1918)
- Vitalie Nagacevschi – Lawyer, Member of Parliament of Moldova between 2009–2010
