= Florești District =

Coordinates: 47°50′N 28°20′E

Raionul Florești
- District
- Flag Coat of arms

- Country: Republic of Moldova
- Administrative center (Oraș-reședință): Florești
- Established: 2002

Government
  - Raion president: Vasile Tîltu (PAS, 2023)

Area
  - Total: 1,108 km^{2} (428 sq mi)
- Elevation: 289 m (948 ft)

Population (2024)
  - Total: 53,264
  - Density: 48.07/km^{2} (124.5/sq mi)
- Time zone: UTC+2 (EET)
  - Summer (DST): UTC+3 (EEST)
- Area code: +373 50
- Car plates: FR
- Website: http://floresti.md

Florești (Romanian pronunciation: [floˈreʃtʲ]) is a district (Romanian: raion) in the north-east of Moldova, with the administrative center at Florești. The other major cities are Ghindeşti and Mărculeşti. In the 2024 Moldovan census, its population was 53,264.

== History ==
Localities with the oldest documentary attestation of the district are: Cuhureștii de Sus, Cuhureștii de Jos, Cunicea documented on 20 December 1437. The fifteenth to seventeenth centuries in the region were marked by continued development of trade and the local economy, and a significant increase in the population. Floresti itself is first documented on 20 August 1588. The eighteenth century was marked by economic decline of the region because of the constant wars waged by the regional powers: Polish–Lithuanian Commonwealth, Ottoman Empire, Russian Empire. In 1812 the region was occupied by the Russian Empire, and besides the local Population of Moldovans, many Ukrainians and Russians settled here. In 1870 is certified as fair Floresti voloste center. After the collapse of Russian Empire in 1917, Bessarabia formed a union with Romania. In 1940 Basarabia it is again occupied by the USSR after the Molotov–Ribbentrop pact. In 1944–1991 Glodeni district in the center became the composition of the MSSR. In 1991 as a result of the proclamation of Independence of Moldova, part of the Soroca County (1991–2003), and in 2003 became administrative unit of Moldova.

== Geography ==
Floresti district (http://floresti.md) is located in north-eastern part of Moldova and is bordered to the north Soroca District, north-west Drochia District, Telenesti District to the south, east to Camenca District, south-east Soldanesti District and west with Singerei District. Landscape is fragmented in Nistru Plateau, and less in Balti steppe in the west. Soil consists of chernozem, cambisol, alluvial soil and arenosol. Maximum altitude is 289 m Nistru plateau.

=== Climate ===
District climate is temperate-continental. The average temperature in July is 20 °C (68 °F), and in January −5 °C (23 °F). Annual precipitation 450–550 mm, in some years up to 700–750 mm. Average wind speed 3–5 m/s.

=== Fauna ===
Fauna of the district is typical of Central Europe with: fox, ferret, rabbit, hedgehog, deer, wild boar, wild cat, red deer and wolf. Of birds are present: stork, crow, partridge, hawk, egret, swan and others.

=== Flora ===
Forests occupy 8.2% of the district and are characterized by the presence of: oak, common oak, ash, maple, acacia others. Plants, mainly steppe: fescue, mugwort, bells and more.

=== Rivers ===
The largest river is the Nistru, which crosses the district in the east, Raut (286 km) right tributaries crosses district in the south, is the largest tributaries of the Nistru, other major rivers Cubolta (102 km) and Cainari. Most lakes are of natural origin.

== Administrative subdivisions ==
http://floresti.md

- Localities: 74
- Administrative centers: Florești
- Cities: Florești, Ghindești, Mărculești
- Villages: 34
- Commons: 37

== Demographics ==
In the 2024 Moldova Census, the district had a population of 53,264 - with 24.8% urban and 75.2% rural population.

=== Ethnic groups ===
Ethnic group	% of total
Moldovans *	88.5
Romanians *	4.0
Ukrainians	3.9
Russians	3.1
Romani	0.1
Gagauz	0.0
Bulgarians	0.0
Other	0.1
Undeclared	0.2

Footnote: * There is an ongoing controversy regarding the ethnic identification of Moldovans and Romanians.

=== Religion ===
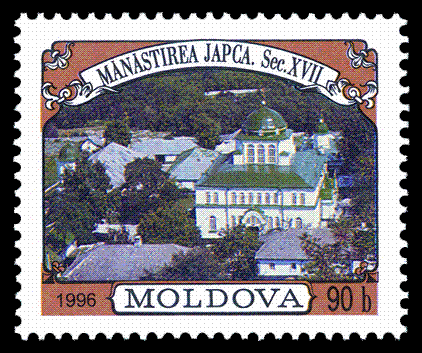
Japca Monastery (17th century), it is the only monastery from Moldova which was never closed by the Soviet authorities

- Christians – 99.3%
  - Orthodox Christians – 95.7%
  - Old Believers – 1.9%
  - Protestant – 1.7%
- Other – 0.1%
- No Religion – 0.2%
- Not Declared - 0.4%

== Economy ==
In the district are 33,200 registered businesses. The share of agricultural land is 88,934 ha (80.2%) of total land area. Arable land occupies 70 070 ha (63.2%) of the total agricultural land, orchards plantations – 4456 ha (4.0%), vineyards occupy 1175 ha (1.0%), pastures – 11,422 ha (10.1%), others – 1811 ha (1.6%). The main branch of economy is agriculture, it is specified in growth: sunflower, sugar beet, tobacco, cereals (wheat, barley, oats), vegetables.

== Education ==
In Floresti working 56 middle and high schools including primary schools—5 with 391 students, middle schools—24 with 3,127 students, general secondary schools—14 with 3165 students, schools—11 with 5031 students, boarding schools—one with 120 students, special schools—one with 112 students. 4 schools in the district working professional with 837 students. The district operates 31 preschools with a number of 1,811 children.

== Politics ==
The district is located in the so-called electoral region "North Red" (the region where the PCRM usually get over 50% of the vote). But the last three elections the Communists are in a constant fall. The elections of 2010 the PCRM won only 0.38% from AEI. District is one of the founding members of Euroregion Dniester.

During the last three elections AEI had an increase of 68.8%

Parliament elections results
Year	AEI	PCRM
2010	47.21% 19,815	47.59% 19,973
July 2009	42.57% 17,782	54.39% 22,714
April 2009	28.10% 11,736	61.17% 25,545

=== Elections ===
Summary of 28 November 2010 Parliament of Moldova election results in Floresti District
Parties and coalitions	Votes	%	+/−
Party of Communists of the Republic of Moldova	19,973	47.59	−6.80
Liberal Democratic Party of Moldova	9,707	23.13	+5.58
Democratic Party of Moldova	7,244	17,26	+1.96
Liberal Party	1,748	4.16	−0.74
Party Alliance Our Moldova	1,116	2.66	−2.16
European Action Movement	483	1.15	+1.15
Other Party	1,714	4.05	+1.01
Total (turnout 60.62%)	42,329	100.00	

== Culture ==
In district works: 58 houses of culture and artistic cultural centers with 22 "Model", 56 public libraries with books—462,000 copies, 2 music schools, a school of fine arts, three museums.

== Health ==
In Floresti district works: Floresti Hospital, with 320 beds and two branches in Vertiujeni and Sanatauca each with 17 beds, a center of family doctors in the composition of which are: the district department of family physicians, 27 offices of family doctors and 13 health center, 30 pharmacies.

== Personalities ==
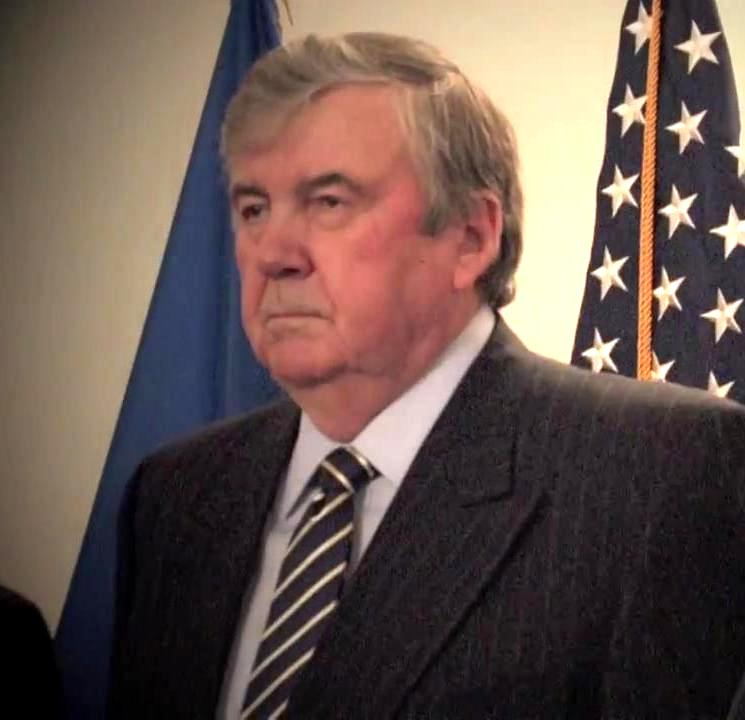
Mircea Snegur, first president of Moldova

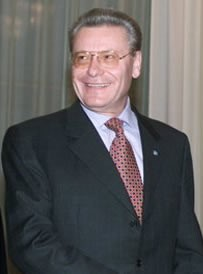
Petru Lucinschi

- Avraham Granot – Zionist activist, Israeli politician and a signatory of the Israeli declaration of independence
- Mircea Snegur – First Moldovan president in 1990-1996
- Pavel Krushevan – journalist, publicist and politician of the extreme right, collaborator with shadowy Okhrana (tsarist institution of espionage and sabotage)
- Petru Lucinschi – President of Moldova in 1996-2001
- Adrian Prodan- Journalist and television presenter
