= Sîngera =

City in Chișinău municipality, Moldova

- City
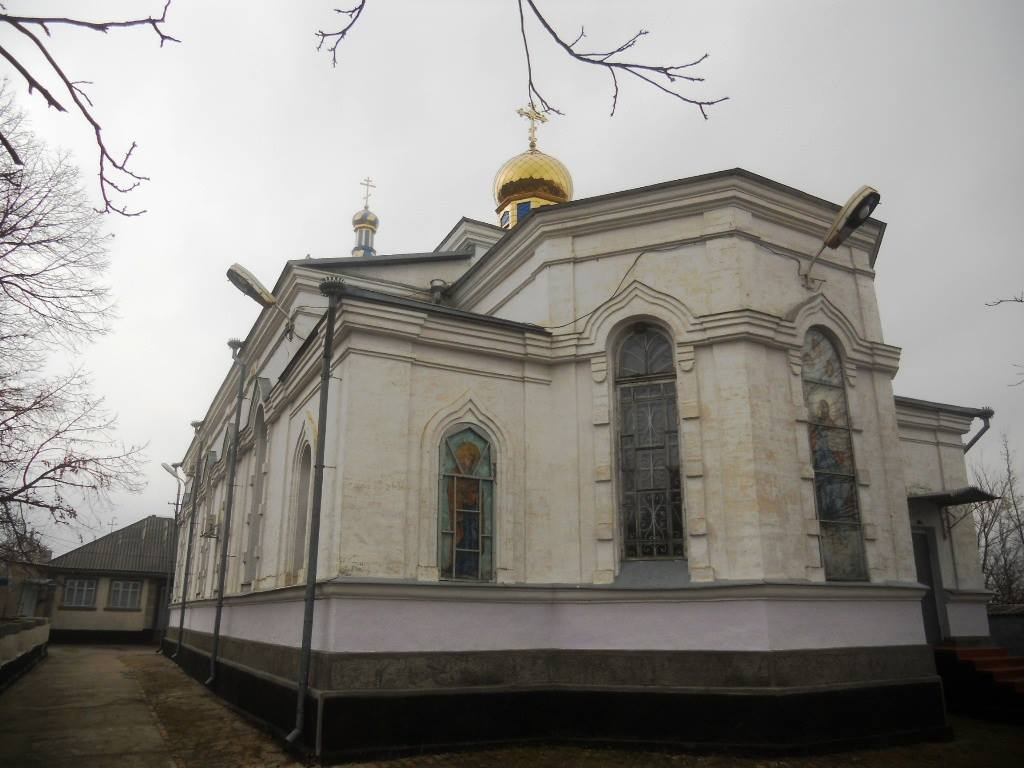
- “Dormition of the Mother of God” Church

- Location in Moldova
- Coordinates: 46°54′50″N 28°58′15″E
- Country: Moldova
- Municipality: Chișinău

Government
  - Mayor: Valeriu Popa (Voința Poporului Party)

Area
  - Total: 53.4 km^{2} (20.6 sq mi)
- Elevation: 52 m (171 ft)

Population (2024)
  - Total: 12,368
  - Density: 232/km^{2} (600/sq mi)
- Time zone: UTC+2 (EET)
  - Summer (DST): UTC+3 (EEST)
- Website: Official website

Sîngera (Romanian pronunciation: [ˈsɨnd͡ʒera]) is a town in Chișinău municipality, Moldova. It lies southeast of the capital, along the national R2 road to Odessa, and is crossed by the Ișnovăț, a right tributary of the Bîc River. The town stands about 18 kilometers from central Chișinău, 4 kilometers from the Revaca railway station, and immediately adjacent to Chișinău International Airport.

Sîngera administratively includes the villages of Dobrogea and Revaca.

== History ==
Sîngera was first mentioned in historical documents on June 8, 1485, under the name Sultana. According to local tradition, the current name derives from a legend recalling a fierce battle between Romanians and Turks fought in the valley near the settlement, during which “so much blood was shed that it reached the horses’ ankles.” From this image of sacrifice and struggle came the name Sîngera, meaning “bloody” or “place of blood.”

The “Dormition of the Mother of God” Church in Sîngera was built of stone in 1880, replacing an earlier wooden church. A parish school and library were established nearby in the late 19th century. The church was reconstructed in 1921 and consecrated by the local archbishop, remaining one of the town’s most significant historical and religious sites. The town also hosts the Church of the “Holy and Righteous Parents Joachim and Anna”, which continues to serve the local community today.

== Demographics ==
According to the 2024 census, 12,368 inhabitants lived in Sîngera, an increase compared to the previous census in 2014, when 9,966 inhabitants were registered.

Ethnic composition of Sîngera (2024)
1. Moldovans (Note: There is an ongoing controversy regarding the ethnic identification of Moldovans and Romanians.) (90.3%)
2. Romanians (7.60%)
3. Others (2.10%)
Linguistic composition of Sîngera (2024)
1. Romanian (54.9%)
2. Moldovan (Note: In March 2023, the Parliament of Moldova passed a law updating all legislative texts and the constitution to refer to the national language as Romanian, effectively rendering the term "Moldovan" obsolete.) (40.7%)
3. Russian (3.70%)
4. Other (0.60%)

Historical population
Year	Pop.	±%
2004	11,609	—
2014	9,966	−14.2%
2024	12,368	+24.1%

== International relations ==
=== Twin towns — Sister cities ===
Sîngera is twinned with:

- Huși, Romania
