= Mesrop Mashtots =

Armenian theologian and linguist (362–440)

- Մեսրոպ Մաշտոց
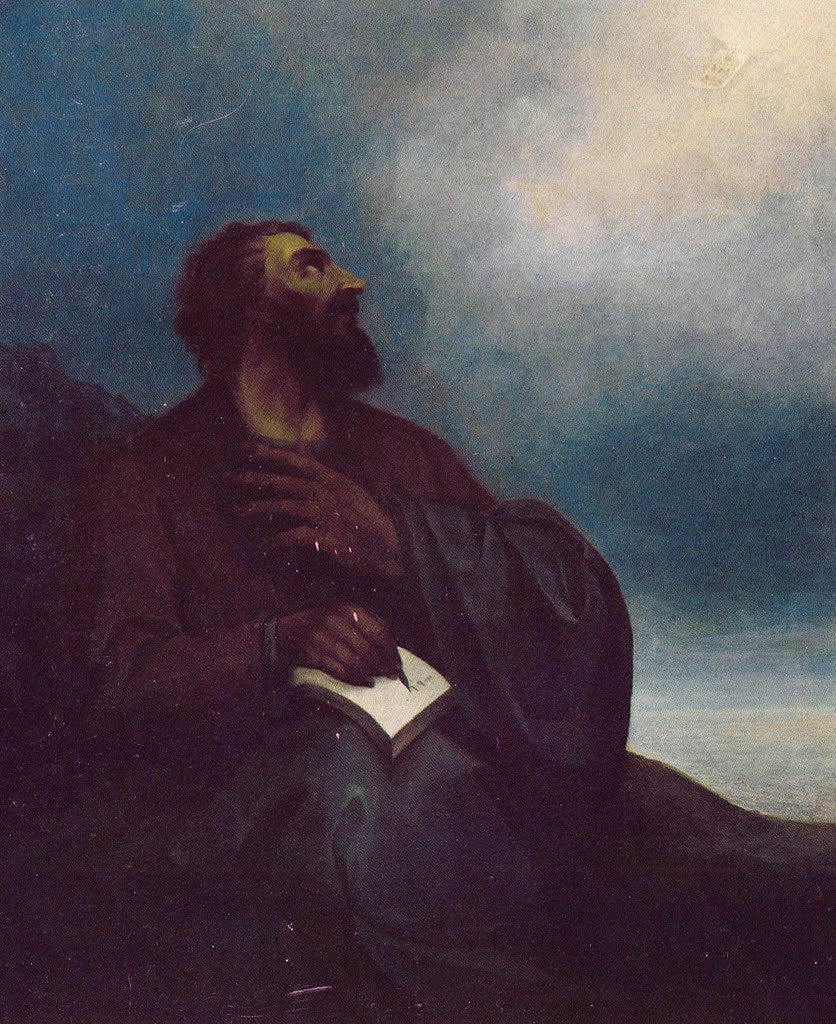
- This 1882 painting by Stepanos Nersissian (now kept at the Pontifical Residence in Etchmiadzin) is a commonly reproduced image of Mashtots.
- Born: c. 361; Hatsekats, Taron, Greater Armenia (modern-day Güven, Korkut, Muş Province, Turkey)
- Died: 17 February 440 (aged 78–79) (traditional date); Vagharshapat, Sasanian Armenia
- Resting place: Saint Mesrop Mashtots Church, Oshakan, Armenia
- Occupations: Court secretary, missionary, militaryman, inventor
- Era: Armenian Golden Age
- Known for: Inventing the Armenian alphabet

Mesrop Mashtots (Armenian: Մեսրոպ Մաշտոց, romanized: Mesrop Maštocʻ (Note: Eastern Armenian: [mɛsˈɾop maʃˈtotsʰ]; Western Armenian: [mɛsˈɾob maʃˈtotsʰ]) 362 – 17 February 440 AD) was an Armenian linguist, composer, theologian, statesman, and hymnologist. He is venerated as a saint in the Armenian Apostolic Church.

He is best known for inventing the Armenian alphabet c. 405 AD, which was a fundamental step in strengthening Armenian national identity. He is also considered to be the creator of the Caucasian Albanian and, possibly, the Asomtavruli Georgian script, though it is disputed.

== Sources ==
The chief sources for the life and work of Mashtots are Koriun, Ghazar Parpetsi, and Movses Khorenatsi. The Life of Mashtots (Վարք Մաշտոցի), (Note: Full title: Պատմութիւն վարուց եւ մահուան առն երանելւոյ սրբոյն Մաշտոցի վարդապետի մերոյ թարգմանչի ի Կորիւն վարդապետէ, English: The Story of the Life and Death of the Blessed Man St. Mashtots Vardapet Our Translator by Koriun Vardapet.) a hagiography by Koriun, a disciple of Mashtots, is the primary and most reliable source. The oldest fragments of the incomplete The Life manuscript are dated 12th century and are kept in Paris's Bibliothèque nationale (Arm. 178), two shorter versions of The Life dated to middle of the 14th century and one longer version of The Life is dated to the late 17th century. Hrachia Acharian, who authored the most comprehensive study on Mashtots and the Armenian alphabet, defended Koriun's work as the only accurate account. It was commissioned by Catholicos Hovsep I, also a student of Mashtots, and written c. 443–450/451. The work has two versions: long and short. The former is considered by most scholars to be the original. Parpetsi and Khorenatsi largely relied upon Koriun's work. The oldest extant manuscript of Koriun's Life of Mashtots has been dated to the 12th century. It was first printed in Armenian by the Mekhitarists in San Lazzaro degli Armeni, Venice in 1833, and has been translated thrice into Modern Armenian (Note: Twice into Western Armenian (1900, 1951) and once into Eastern Armenian (by Manuk Abeghian, 1941).) and several foreign languages. (Note: Latin by Voskan Yerevantsi (c. 1644), (Note: Titled Vita beati magistri Mesrop, it is kept at the Bibliothèque nationale de France (BnF) in Paris. The BnF dates the work to the 18th century (1701-1800).) German (1841), French (1869), Russian (1962), English (1964, 2022, 2025), Italian (1998), Georgian (2019).)

== Name ==
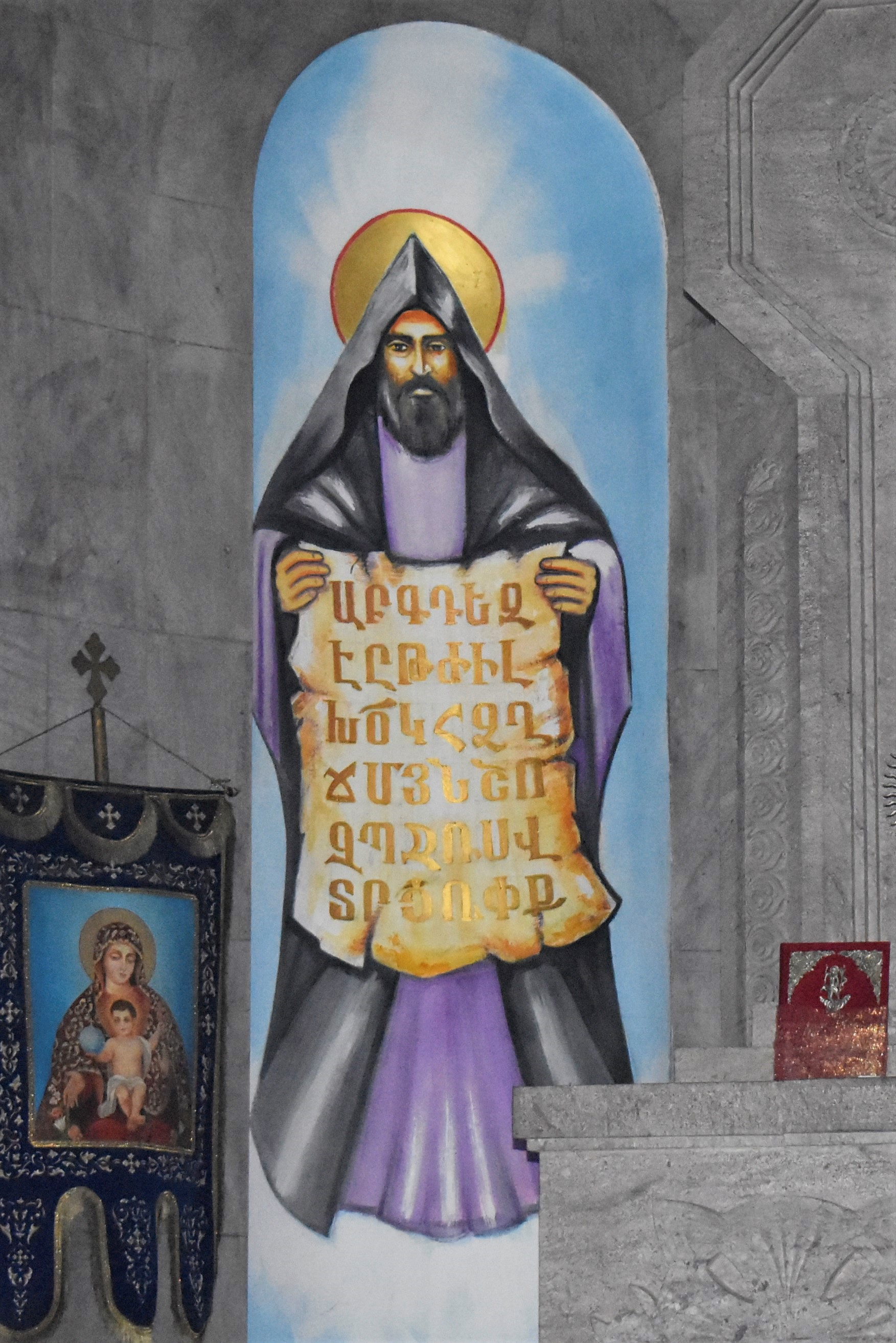
A depiction of Mashtots in Kapan's St. Mesrop Mashtots Church

While Koriun, his chief biographer, only refers to him as Mashtots, Movses Khorenatsi (Note: Movses Khorenatsi calls him Mesrop in 32 instances and Mashtots in only one.) and later Armenian historiography predominantly calls him Mesrop. (Note: There are various spellings of Mesrop (Մեսրովպ, Mesrovp; Մեսրովբ, Mesrovb; Մեսրոբ, Mesrob; Մասրովպ, Masrovp) and Mashtots (Մաշթոց, Masht’ots Մաշդոց, Mashdots, Մաժդոց, Mazhdots).) It was not until the 20th century that he came to be referred to by both names, sometimes spelled with a hyphen. Some scholars, including Malachia Ormanian, maintain that Mashtots was his birth name, while Mesrop was his ecclesiastical name by which he was ordained. Anton Garagashian believed the opposite to be true. According to James R. Russell, Mashtots was his primary name, while Mesrop a secondary one, "possibly an epithet."

The etymologies of both Mesrop and Mashtots have been widely debated. In his authoritative dictionary of Armenian names, Hrachia Acharian described Mashtots to be of uncertain origin. Nicholas Adontz believed it stemmed from Iranian mašt (from mazd), which is also the origin of the name Mazdak. Asatur Mnatsakanian suggested an origin from the name of the Urartian goddess Bag-Mashtu. Russell argued that the original form of Mashtots may have been Maždoc‘, originated from Middle Parthian mozhdag and means "bearer of good news or reward". Today, Mesrop (Mesrob) is a common male name and Mesropyan (Mesrobian) a common last name among Armenians.

There is more agreement about Mesrop. Acharian considered it to be of unknown origin, but noted that it is usually thought to have originated from "serovbe", Armenian for "seraph", a word of Biblical Hebrew origin. Russell described Mesrop a mysterious word, seemingly Syriac, "perhaps an epithet meaning 'seraphic'." Some scholars maintain that Mesrop is a blend of "Mar" ("lord" in Syriac) and "Serob", a version of "Serovbe".

== Background and early life ==
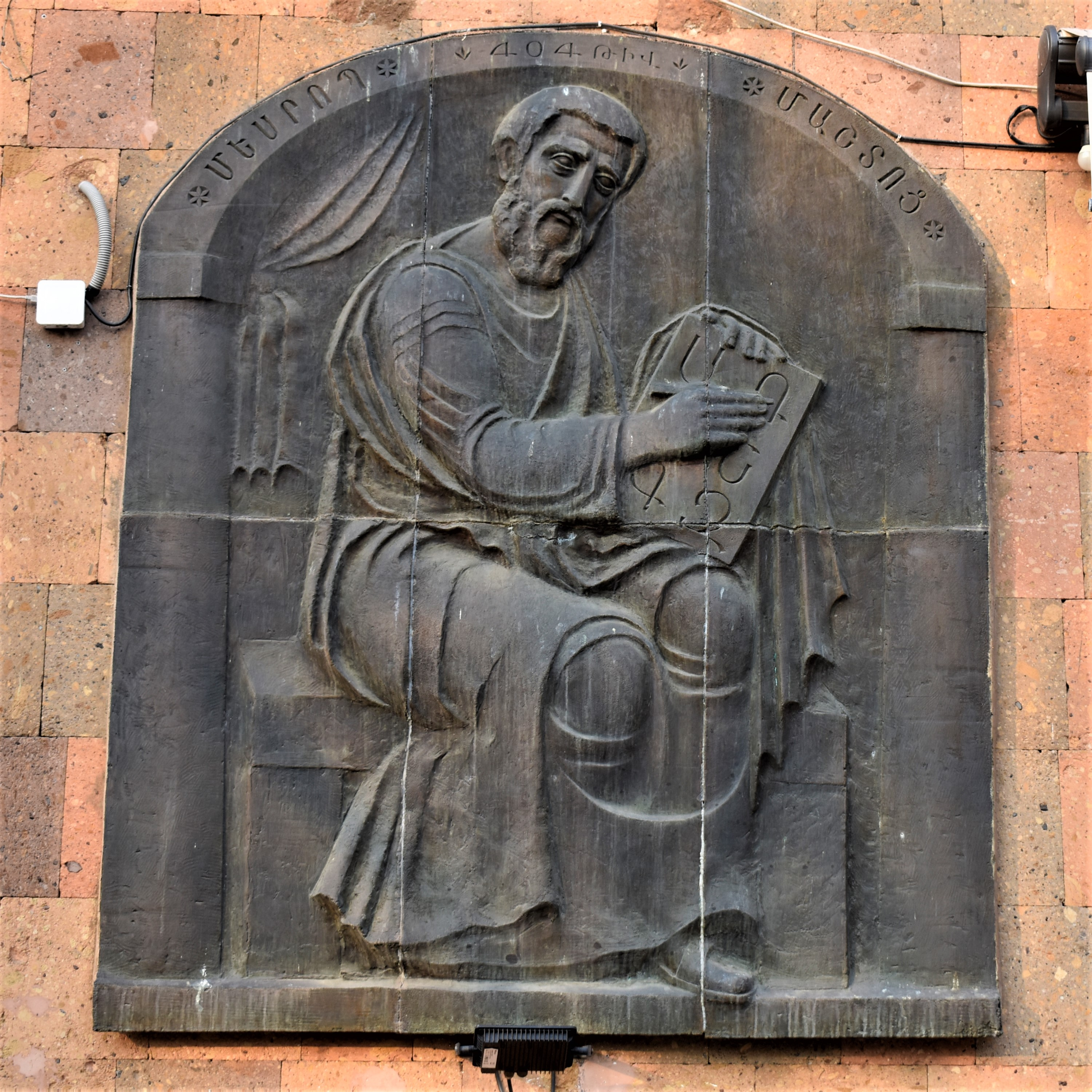
A Soviet-era sculpture of Mashtots in Yerevan

The date of birth of Mashtots is not well-established, but recent scholarship accepts 361. Others give 361–364 as the likely range. (Note: In the Soviet period, the consensus was at 362. It was the date chosen for celebrating his 1600th anniversary in Soviet Armenia, in 1962. However, the official magazine of the Armenian Church, in the biographies of its saints (1980), placed his birth at 360. Malachia Ormanian put his birth at 353.) He was born in the village of Hatsekats (Հացեկաց) in the canton of Taron, (Note: The village, some 40 kilometres (25 mi) east of Mush, was still inhabited prior to the Armenian Genocide and was known to local Armenians as Hatsik (Հացիկ) and to Kurds as Xasik. It was known as Hasık in Turkish until 1928, when it was renamed Güven.) to a father named Vardan, who may have been a priest or a nobleman. Some scholars believe he was affiliated with the Mamikonian dynasty since Taron was their feudal domain. Others suggest he may have belonged to the lesser nobility or reject his noble origin at all. Leo believed he was the son of a peasant. According to Anania Shirakatsi, Vardan was an azat. (Note: Azat is described by Nina Garsoïan as "junior nobility". It literally means "free [men]", who "usually held conditional land tenures.".) Some scholars, including Stepan Malkhasyants, have identified Vardan with Vrik, mentioned by Pavstos Buzand. Vrik was the illegitimate son of Catholicos Pap (not King Pap), the grandson of Gregory the Illuminator (through Husik). Mashtots, thus, may have been a second cousin to Catholicos Sahak Partev. Acharian outright rejected this theory, but it has been cited by Elizabeth Redgate. Other scholars, including Ormanian, believed Mashtots was the son of Vardan Mamikonian (not the better known one), the older brother of sparapet Vasak Mamikonian. (Note: Vardan Mamikonian's daughter, Sahandukht, was the wife of Nerses the Great. Thus, if this version is true, Mashtots was the uncle of Sahak Partev.) This theory has been rejected by Hakob Manandian and Garnik Fntglian. James R. Russell writes that Mashtots' father was "probably a member of the Mamikonean clan."

Another point of contention is whether Mashtots was a student of Nerses the Great, first mentioned by Khorenatsi. Both Acharian and Leo rejected it. Acharian noted that Mashtots probably studied at the prominent Surb Karapet Monastery, not far from his birthplace. Koriun tells that Mashtots received "Hellenic education," i.e. education in the Greek language. (Note: He may have traveled to Antioch to receive Greek education.) Besides his native Armenian, Mashtots knew Greek, Persian (Middle Persian), and Syriac (Aramaic).

In late 380s Mashtots moved to Vagharshapat, Armenia's capital, where he began a career at the court of King Khosrov III. While Khorenatsi says that he worked as a royal secretary, both Koriun and Parpetsi assign him other positions as well, especially in the military. He was initially royal chancellor (ark’uni divanapet), then moved on to serve in the military after receiving training.

In c. 394 Mashtots became a clergyman and was ordained as a monk and lived in a monastery, in Goghtn. He, thereafter, became an ascetic hermit to live in the mountains and uninhabited areas. Mashtots then gathered a group of 40 disciples and began missionary work among Armenians, many of whom were still pagan. He begin his first mission in Goghtn around 395. He successfully spread Christianity in the area and expelled the pagans.

== Life ==
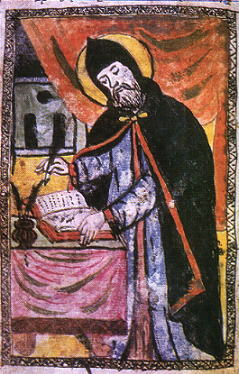
Mesrop in a 1776 Armenian manuscript

Koryun, his pupil and biographer, writes that Mashtots received a good education and was versed in the Greek and Persian languages. On account of his piety and learning, Mesrop was appointed secretary to King Khosrov IV, in charge of writing royal decrees and edicts in Persian and Greek.

Leaving the court, Mashtots took the holy orders and withdrew to a monastery with a few companions, leading a life of great austerity for several years. In 394, with the blessing of Sahak Part'ev, Mashtots set out on a proselytizing mission. With the support of Prince Shampith, he preached the Gospel in the district of Goghtn near the river Araxes, converting many.

Encouraged by the patriarch and the king, Mesrop founded numerous schools in different parts of the country, in which the youth were taught the new alphabet. He himself taught at the Amaras monastery of the Armenian province of Artsakh (located in the contemporary Martuni region of the unrecognized Nagorno-Karabakh Republic). However, his activity was not confined to Eastern Armenia. Provided with letters from the Catholicos, he went to Constantinople and obtained from emperor Theodosius the Younger permission to preach and teach in his Armenian possessions. Having returned to Eastern Armenia to report to the patriarch, his first thought was to provide religious literature for his countrymen. He sent some of his numerous disciples to Edessa, Constantinople, Athens, Antioch, Alexandria, and other centers of learning, to study the Greek language and bring back the masterpieces of Greek literature. The most famous of his pupils were John of Egheghiatz, Joseph of Baghin, Yeznik, Koriun, Moses of Chorene, and John Mandakuni.

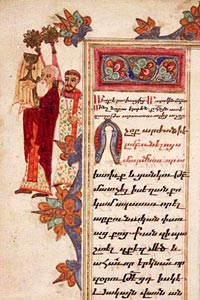
Verses of Mesrop Mashtots

The first monument of Armenian literature is the version of the Holy Scriptures. Isaac, says Moses of Chorene, made a translation of the Bible from the Syriac text about 411. This work was considered imperfect, for soon afterwards John of Egheghiatz and Joseph of Baghin were sent to Edessa to translate the Scriptures. They journeyed as far as Constantinople and brought back authentic copies of the Greek text with them. With the help of other copies obtained from Alexandria, the Bible was translated again from the Greek according to the text of the Septuagint and Origen's Hexapla. This version, now in use in the Armenian Church, was completed about 434.

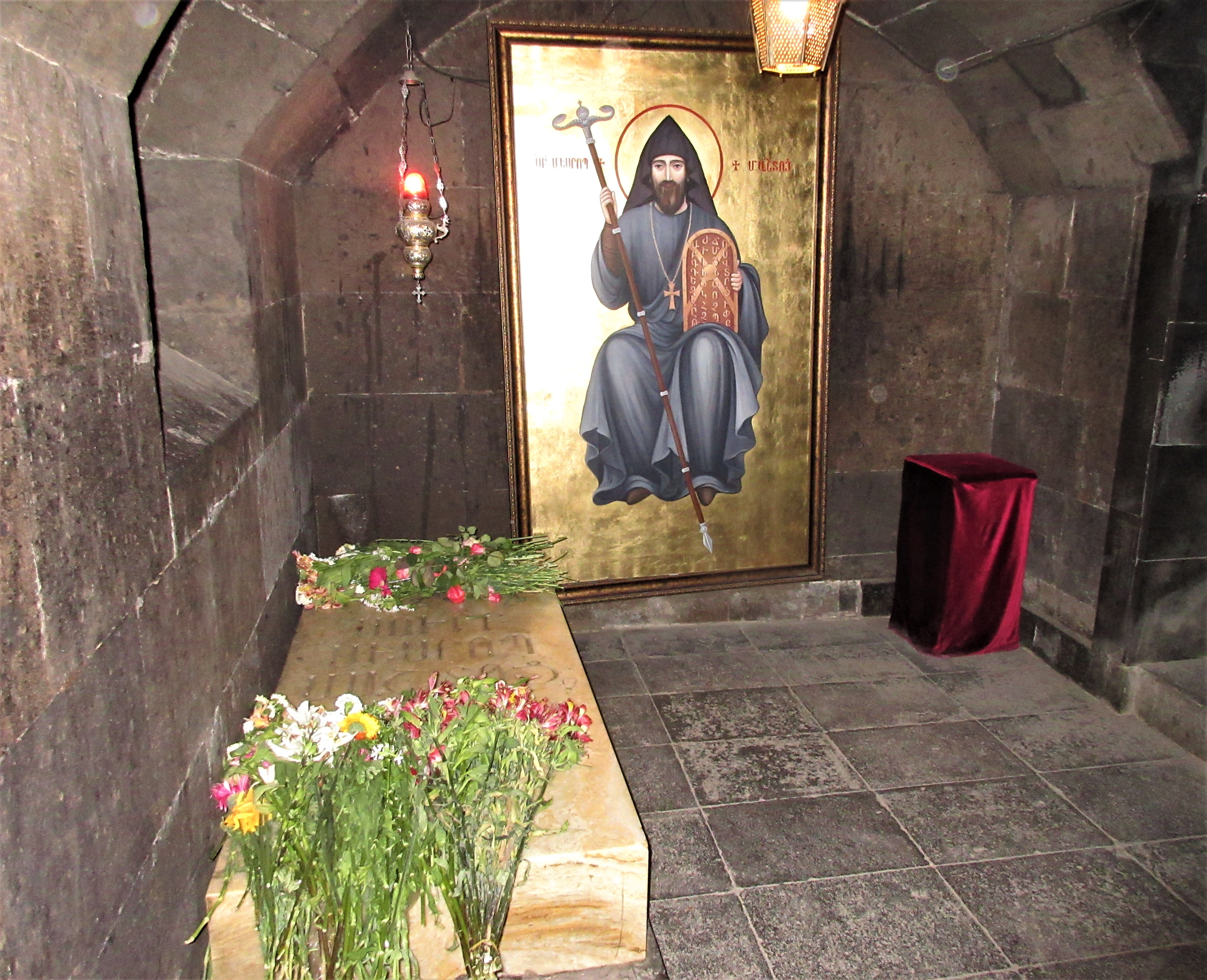
Gravesite of Mesrop Mashtots in the village of Oshakan

The decrees of the first three ecumenical councils—Nicæa, Constantinople, and Ephesus—and the national liturgy (so far written in Syriac) were also translated into Armenian, the latter being revised on the liturgy of St. Basil, though retaining characteristics of its own. Many works of the Greek Fathers were also translated into Armenian. The loss of the Greek originals has given some of those versions a special importance; thus, the second part of Eusebius's Chronicle, of which only a few fragments exist in Greek, has been preserved entirely in Armenian. In the midst of his literary labors, Mashtots revisited the districts he had evangelized in his earlier years, and, after the death of Isaac in 439, looked after the spiritual administration of the patriarchate. He survived his friend and master by only six months. Armenians read his name in the Canon of the Liturgy and celebrate his memory on 19 February.

Mashtots is buried at a chapel in Oshakan, a historical village 8 km (5.0 miles) southwest from the town of Ashtarak. He is listed officially in the Roman Martyrology of the Roman Catholic Church; his feast day is 17 February.

== Alphabet ==
Armenia lost its independence in 387 and was divided between the Byzantine Empire and Persia, which received about four-fifths of its territory. Western Armenia was governed by Byzantine generals, while an Armenian king ruled as Persian vassal over eastern Armenia. The principal events of this period are the reinvention of the Armenian alphabet, the revision of the liturgy, the creation of an ecclesiastical and national literature, and the revision of hierarchical relations. Three men are prominently associated with this work: Mashtots, Part'ev, and King Vramshapuh, who succeeded his brother Khosrov IV in 389.

Armenians probably had an alphabet of their own, as historical writers reference an "Armenian alphabet" before Mashtots, but used Greek, Persian, and Syriac scripts to translate Christian texts, none of which was well suited for representing the many complex sounds of their native tongue. The Holy Scriptures and the liturgy were, to a large extent, unintelligible to the faithful and required the intervention of translators and interpreters.

Mashtots was assisted in inventing an Armenian writing system by Sahak and Vramshapuh. He consulted Daniel, a bishop of Mesopotamia, and Rufinus, a monk of Samosata, on the matter and created an alphabet of thirty-six letters; two more (long O (Օ, օ) and F (Ֆ, ֆ)) were added in the twelfth century.

The first sentence in Armenian written down by Mesrop after he invented the letters was the opening line of Solomon's Book of Proverbs:

Ճանաչել զիմաստութիւն եւ զխրատ, իմանալ զբանս հանճարոյ:
Čanačʿel zimastutʿiwn ew zxrat, imanal zbans hančaroy.
«To know wisdom and instruction; to perceive the words of understanding.»

— Book of Proverbs, 1:2.

The reinvention of the alphabet around 405 was crucial for Armenian literature and was significant in the creation of a separate idea of Armenian language and what was connected to it. "The result of the work of Isaac and Mesrop", says St. Martin, "was to separate for ever the Armenians from the other peoples of the East, to make of them a distinct nation, and to strengthen them in the Christian Faith by forbidding or rendering profane all the foreign alphabetic scripts which were employed for transcribing the books of the heathens and of the followers of Zoroaster. To Mesrop we owe the preservation of the language and literature of Armenia; but for his work, the people would have been absorbed by the Persians and Syrians, and would have disappeared like so many nations of the East".

Medieval Armenian sources also claim that Mashtots invented the Georgian and Caucasian Albanian alphabets around the same time. Most scholars link the creation of the Georgian script to the process of Christianization of Iberia, a core Georgian kingdom of Kartli. The alphabet was therefore most probably created between the conversion of Iberia under King Mirian III (326 or 337) and the Bir el Qutt inscriptions of 430, contemporaneously with the Armenian alphabet.

== Legacy and recognition ==
Modern Armenian scholarship recognizes Mashtots as the founder of Armenian literature and education and as the "greatest enlightener and first teacher" of the Armenian people. The figure of Mashtots has become a "symbol that embodies the Armenian language, church, and school system, connecting each to one another." In Armenian narratives, Mashtots is portrayed as the key figure who preserved the national language and the nation against cultural absorption. James R. Russell describes Mashtots as "the culture-hero of Armenian civilization." Anthony D. Smith noted that Mashtots, with his invention, helped "convert and unite Armenians as a chosen people." Gerard Libaridian argued that Mashtots and the alphabet "constitute the most important symbols of cultural identity and regeneration."

Koriun, his biographer, compared Mashtots' return to Armenia after the invention of the alphabet to Moses' descent from Mount Sinai. In another passage, Koriun compared the work of Mashtots and Sahak to the work of the Four Evangelists. Modern scholars have compared Mashtots to Gregory the Illuminator, often describing the former as the "second illuminator." Russell argues that both were visionaries, found a champion for their program in the king, looked to the West, had very strong pro-Hellenic bias, trained the children of pagan priests and assembled their own disciples to spread the faith through learning.

=== Historical assessment ===
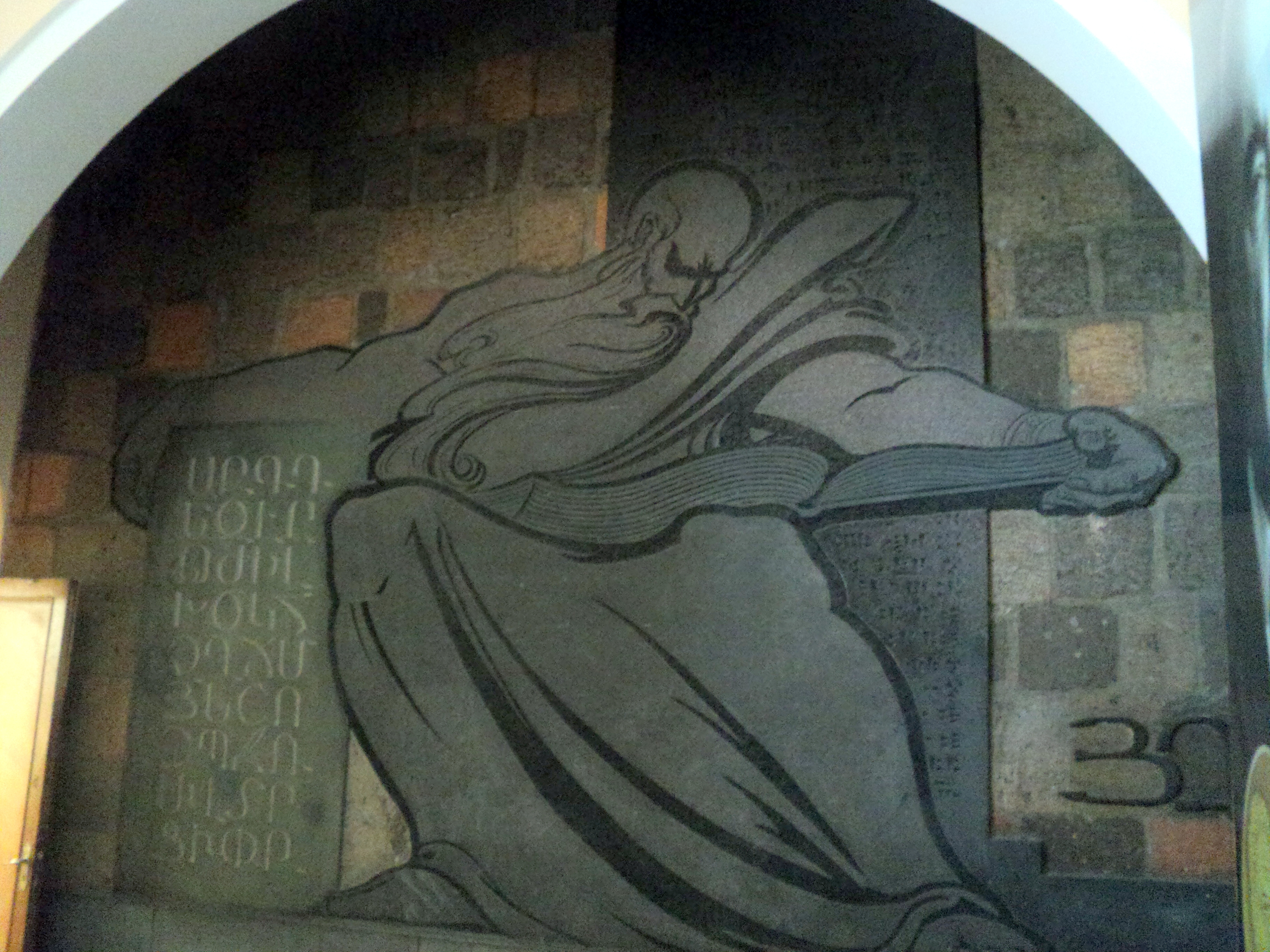
A panel painting of Mashtots by Van Khachatur (1958–59) at the entrance hall of the Armenian Academy of Sciences headquarters in Yerevan.

In his 1904 book on Mashtots, the historian Leo called him the greatest of all of Armenia's historical heroes and contrasted the continued legacy of Mashtots with the legacy of Tigranes the Great's brief empire. Similarly, historian Ashot Hovhannisyan described Mashtots as the "greatest benefactor" of the Armenian people, while the linguist Eduard Aghayan called him simply the "greatest Armenian", a view that has been expressed by others as well. Aghayan further described Mashtots as the "greatest linguist of his time in the broadest sense of the word." Catholicos Vazgen I stated that "everything truly Armenian" was born out of the vision and genius of Mashtots. Viktor Ambartsumian, the long-time president of the Armenian Academy of Sciences, stated in 1962։ "The history of our culture has given many outstanding figures, but of all these figures, the Armenian people owe the most to Mashtots."

Soviet Armenian historiography portrayed Mashtots as a secular figure, in line with the official Marxist-Leninist interpretation of history. Hakob Manandian argued in a 1940 pamphlet that although the invention of the Armenian alphabet by Mashtots was primarily aimed at spreading Christianity, in the long-run it was also politically significant. Armenians entered the "family of ancient cultured peoples" and developed an original culture and rich literature. In a 1991 book Catholicos of Cilicia Karekin I complained that his work was being "depicted with colours of purely political, nationalistic and secular nature."

At the height of the Karabakh movement in 1989, Rafayel Ishkhanian characterized Mesrop Mashtots as "our most genuine, our greatest independentist [...] who, at the moment of the disintegration of the Armenian state, gave us the Armenian alphabet, language and literature, gave us Armenian schools and, as a result, although without political independence, we kept our moral and cultural sovereignty." Levon Ter-Petrosyan, philologist and Armenia's first president, postulates that Mashtots and Gregory the Illuminator had the most influence on the course of Armenian history. Catholic Armenian Archbishop and scholar Levon Zekiyan further argued that Mashtots "was our greatest political thinker." Zekiyan argues that Mashtots laid the foundations of a national ideology, "which gave the Armenians a qualitatively new self-awareness [...] in the wider cultural-anthropological sense of a vision of the world, or Weltanschauung."

== Music ==
Mashtots also produced a number of liturgical compositions. Some of the works attributed to him are: «Մեղայ քեզ Տէր» (Meġay k’ez Tēr, “I have sinned against you, Lord”), «Ողորմեա ինձ Աստուած» (Voġormea inj Astuac, “Have mercy on me, God”), «Անկանիմ առաջի քո» (Ankanim aṙaǰi k’o, “I kneel before you”) and «Ողորմեա» (Voġormea, “Miserere”), all of which are hymns of repentance.

== Veneration ==
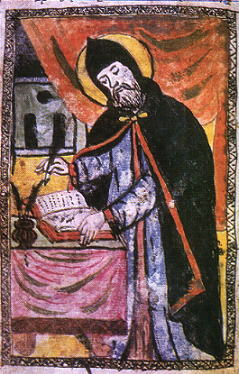
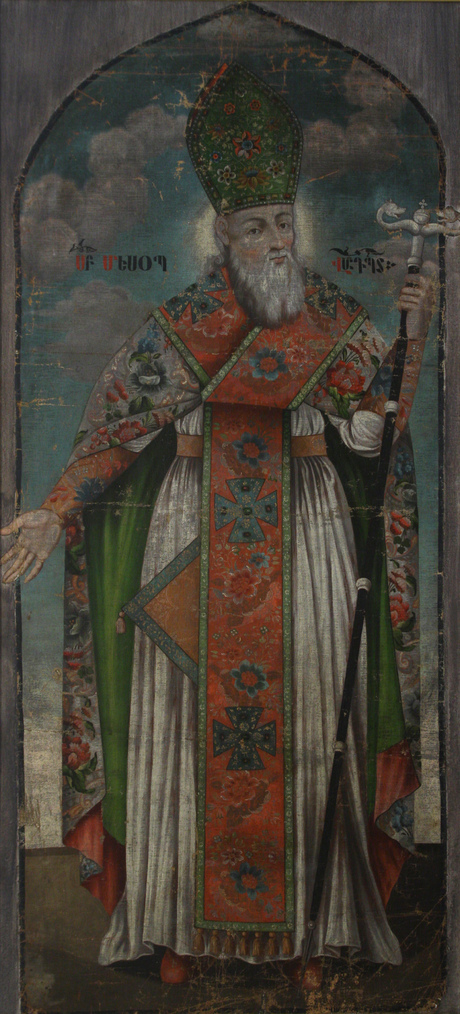
Mashtots on a 1776 miniature (left) and a painting by an unknown 18th century Armenian artist (right) (Note: Kept at the Etchmiadzin Museums. Though it has been attributed to Stepanos Lehatsi, the style is close to that of Hovnatan Hovnatanian. It shows Mashtots in clothing and hat of a Catholicos.)

Mashtots is a saint of the Armenian Apostolic and Armenian Catholic churches. He is sometimes referred to by Armenian churchmen as "The Saint of Oshakan" (Օշականի Սուրբը). There are at least two chants (sharakan) and several canticles (gandz) dedicated to Mashtots and Sahak. A number of churches in modern and historical Armenia (Note: According to Samvel Karapetyan (Research on Armenian Architecture) there are at least 14 monasteries, churches and chapels in historical Greater Armenia named after Mashtots. In 2001 the newly-constructed church St. Mesrop Mashtots of Kapan, one of Armenia's largest towns, was consecrated. The church of the Vazgen Sargsyan Military University, dedicated in 2020 is also named after Mashtots.) and the Armenian diaspora are named after St. Mesrop, Sts. Mesrop and Sahak or the Holy Translators. (Note: Including several churches in Iran, the US, France, Russia, Georgia, Canada, and elsewhere.) He is regarded as the first great vardapet.

The Armenian Apostolic Church has two major days of feast dedicated to Mashtots. The first is the Feast of the Holy Translators (Սուրբ Թարգմանչաց, Surb T’argmanchats), which is celebrated on the second Saturday of October. It was declared a national holiday in 2001. Acharian postulates that it was established no earlier than the 12th century. It is dedicated to Mashtots, Yeghishe, Movses Khorenatsi, David the Invincible, Gregory of Narek and Nerses Shnorhali. Today pilgrimages to the grave of Mashtots in Oshakan are made on this feast. In the Soviet period it became a secular festival.

The second, the Feast of Sahak and Mashtots, is celebrated on the 33rd day after the Pentecost, on Thursdays, between 11 June and 16 July. Acharian considered it the continuation of the original feast dedicated to Mashtots. It was on this feast that pilgrimages to Mashtots' grave in Oshakan were made until the mid-20th century. With the rise of national consciousness in the 19th century, it came to be celebrated in large Armenian communities in Tiflis and Constantinople.

== Commemorations ==
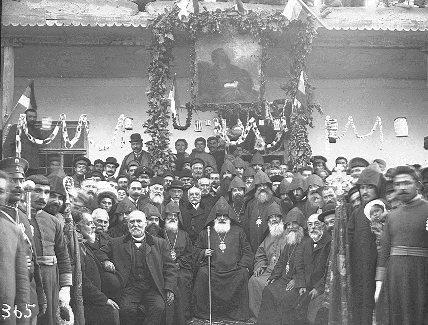
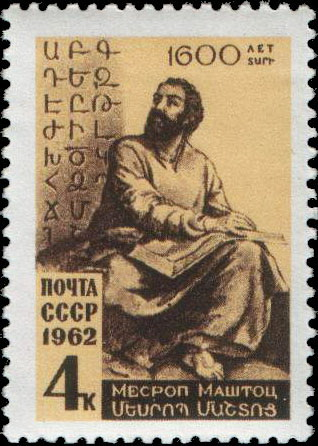
The celebration of the 1500th anniversary of the Armenian alphabet in Etchmiadzin in 1912 with Catholicos George V in the middle and Stepanos Nersissian's portrait of Mashtots hanging overhead (left); and a 1962 Soviet stamp celebrating the 1600th anniversary of the birth of Mashtots (right)

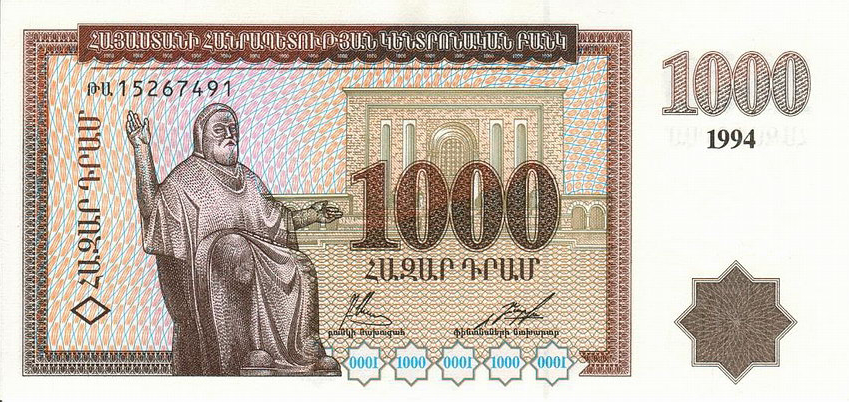
Mashtots on a 1,000 dram bill

The Armenian Apostolic Church celebrated the 1500th anniversary of the Armenian alphabet in 1912–13 and the 1600th anniversary of the birth of Mashtots in 1961.

In May 1962 the 1600th anniversary of the birth of Mashtots was marked with "massive official celebrations" in Soviet Armenia, which had a "powerful impact on Armenian national pride." Vahakn Dadrian noted that Yerevan became an "arena of nationalist fervor and outburst." The statue of Mashtots was ceremonially opened in front of the Matenadaran on May 26. The Matenadaran, established three years earlier, was named after Mashtots on that day according to a government decree.

In a speech at the Yerevan Opera Theater, Soviet Armenian Prime Minister Anton Kochinyan proclaimed that it was the Soviet government that made "Mesropian literature the property of the whole nation and opened the alphabet for every Armenian child." Viktor Ambartsumian, president of the Armenian Academy of Sciences, declared that while Mashtots' invention formerly served Armenian national interests, it now serves communist ideas, fraternity of peoples, world peace and progress. It was also celebrated in Moscow's House of the Unions where Armenian (Silva Kaputikyan and Nairi Zarian) and Soviet (Vadim Kozhevnikov, Marietta Shaginyan, Mykola Bazhan, Andrei Lupan) writers gave speeches. In 1962 the Soviets put into circulation a stamp commemorating Mashtots.

The Order of St. Mesrop Mashtots, awarded for "outstanding achievements" in science, education, healthcare, and culture, was established by the Armenian government in 1993. The St. Sahak-St. Mesrop award was established by the Armenian Church in 1978.

Mashtots and the Matenadaran were featured on the 1,000 Armenian dram banknote of the first series, put into circulation in 1994.

The widest street in central Yerevan, called Stalin, then Lenin Avenue in the Soviet period, was renamed after Mashtots in 1990. (Note: In 2019 the Yerevan City Council voted down a proposal to rename it St. Mesrop Mashtots Avenue.) Between 1985 and 1996, one of Yerevan's eight districts, what are now the districts of Ajapnyak and Davitashen, was called Mashtots.

Institutions named after Mashtots include the Matenadaran, the central library of Stepanakert, the Mashtots Chair in Armenian Studies at Harvard University, the Mesrop Center for Armenian Studies at Martin Luther University Halle-Wittenberg, a number of schools and universities in Armenia, Artsakh and educational and cultural institutions in the Armenian diaspora. (Note: Public schools in Armenia: in Vagharshapat (Ejmiatsin) and Oshakan and elsewhere. Armenian-language schools in Los Angeles (Armenian Mesrobian School), Beirut, Lebanon, Odessa, Ukraine, an Armenian cultural center in Tyumen, Russia.)

== Artistic depictions ==
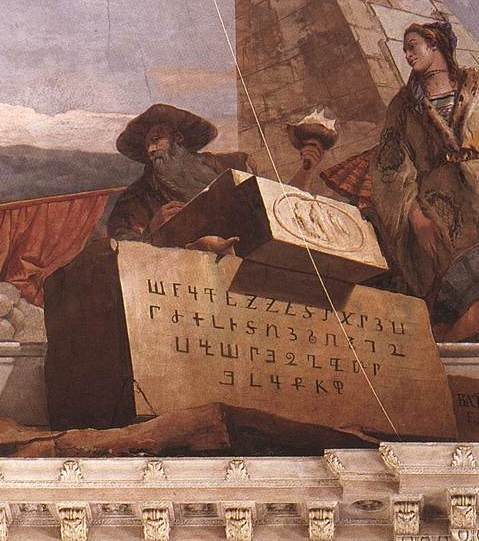
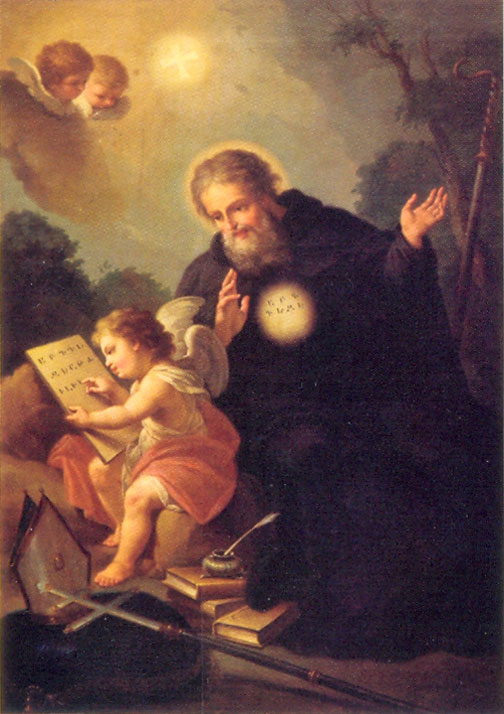
Paintings of Mashtots by 18th century Italian artists Giovanni Battista Tiepolo and Francesco Maggiotto.

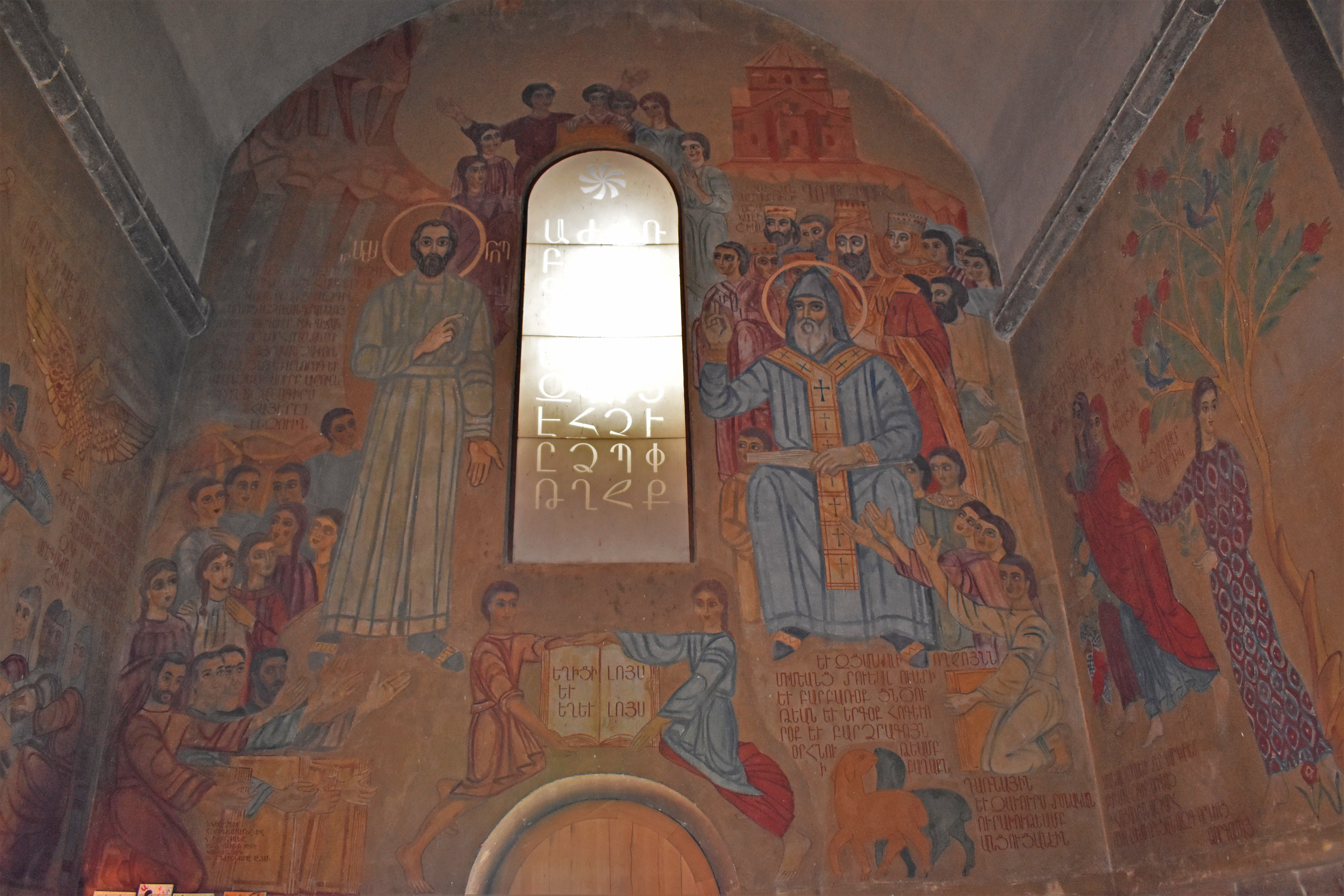
The fresco inside the Oshakan church. Mashtots is depicted standing, to the left of the window.

=== Paintings ===
No contemporary portraits of Mashtots have been found. The first artistic depictions appeared in Armenian illuminated manuscripts (miniatures), primarily in sharakans and haysmavurks, starting from the 14th century. These manuscripts, around 20 in total were created in Constantinople, Etchmiadzin, Sanahin, Haghpat and elsewhere, depict Mashtots with a halo. In the 18th century Mashtots was portrayed by two Italian painters. Giovanni Battista Tiepolo portrayed Mashtots with a pseudo-Armenian alphabet on the frescoes on the ceiling above the staircase of the Würzburg Residence in Bavaria, while Francesco Maggiotto's Italianate portrait of Mashtots hangs at the Armenian Catholic monastery of San Lazzaro degli Armeni near Venice. (Note: A lithograph (view) of this painting appears in Ghevont Alishan's 1901 book Hayapatum.)

Stepanos Nersissian's 1882 painting of Mashtots, commissioned by a wealthy Armenian from Elisabethpol, is considered the most widely recognized artistic depiction of Mashtots. During the Soviet period, numerous Armenian artists portrayed Mashtots. (Note: Some of the more prominent paintings of Mashtots kept at Armenian galleries include portraits by Mher Abeghian (1930), Tigran Tokmajyan (1959–60), Yervand Kochar (1962), Rudolf Khachatrian (1962), Ashot Zorian (1962), and Suren Safarian (1962). At a 1962 Yerevan exhibition paintings of Mashtots by as many as 50 Armenian artists were displayed.) Van Khachatur (Vanik Khachatryan) created a panel painting of Mashtots in 1958–59 for the entrance hall of the Armenian Academy of Sciences in Yerevan. Hovhannes Minasian and Henrik Mamian created a fresco, in 1961–64, for Saint Mesrop Mashtots Church in Oshakan, where he is buried. In 1981 a tapestry titled The Armenian Alphabet, where Mashtots is the central figure, was completed by French weavers based on a painting by Grigor Khanjyan. It is kept at the Pontifical Residence at the Mother See of Holy Etchmiadzin. In 1992–94 Khanjyan created a large mural of the same painting inside the Yerevan Cascade (now the Cafesjian Center for the Arts).

=== Statues and sculptures ===
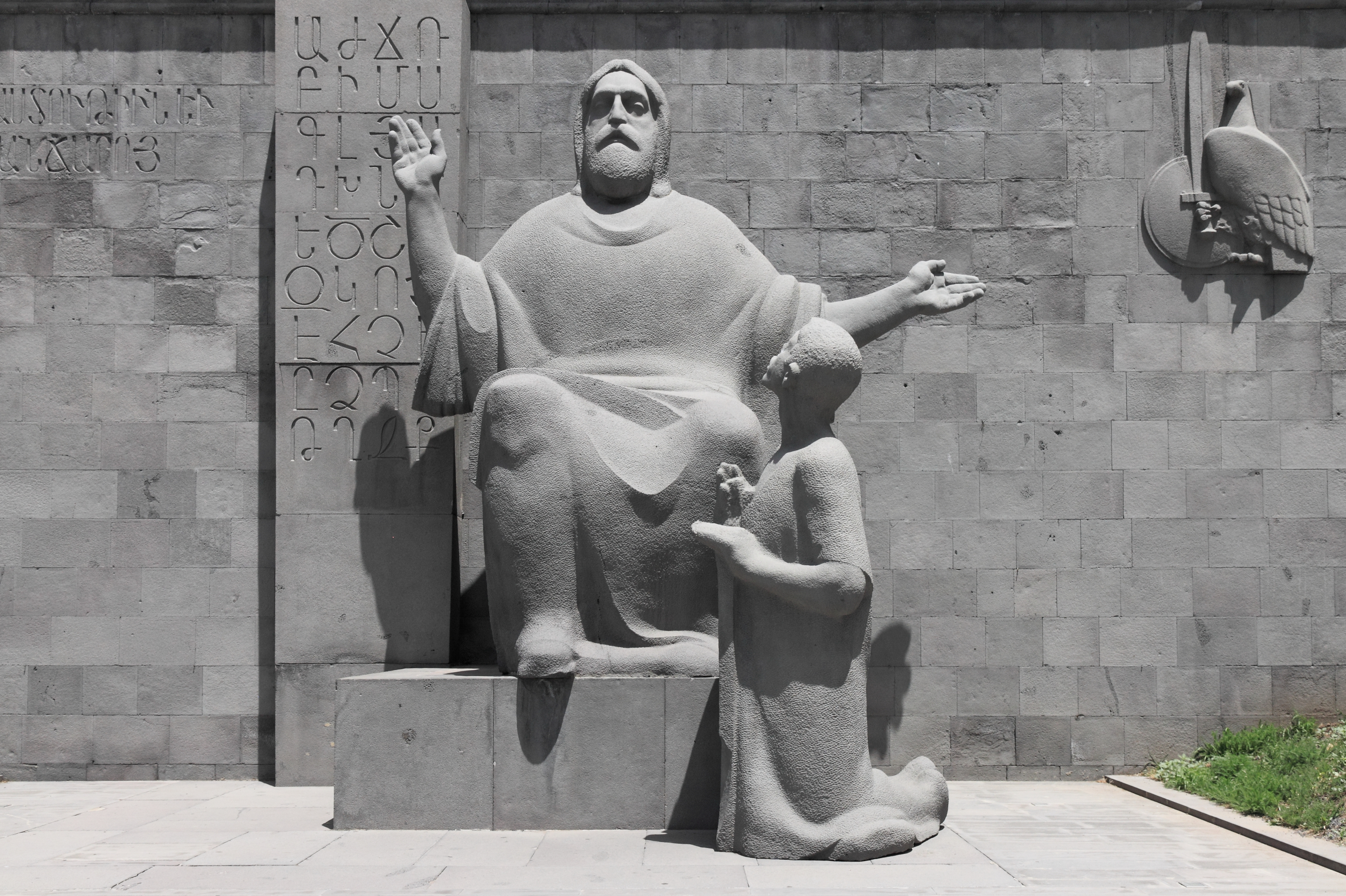
The statue of Mesrop Mashtots in front of the Matenadaran (1962).

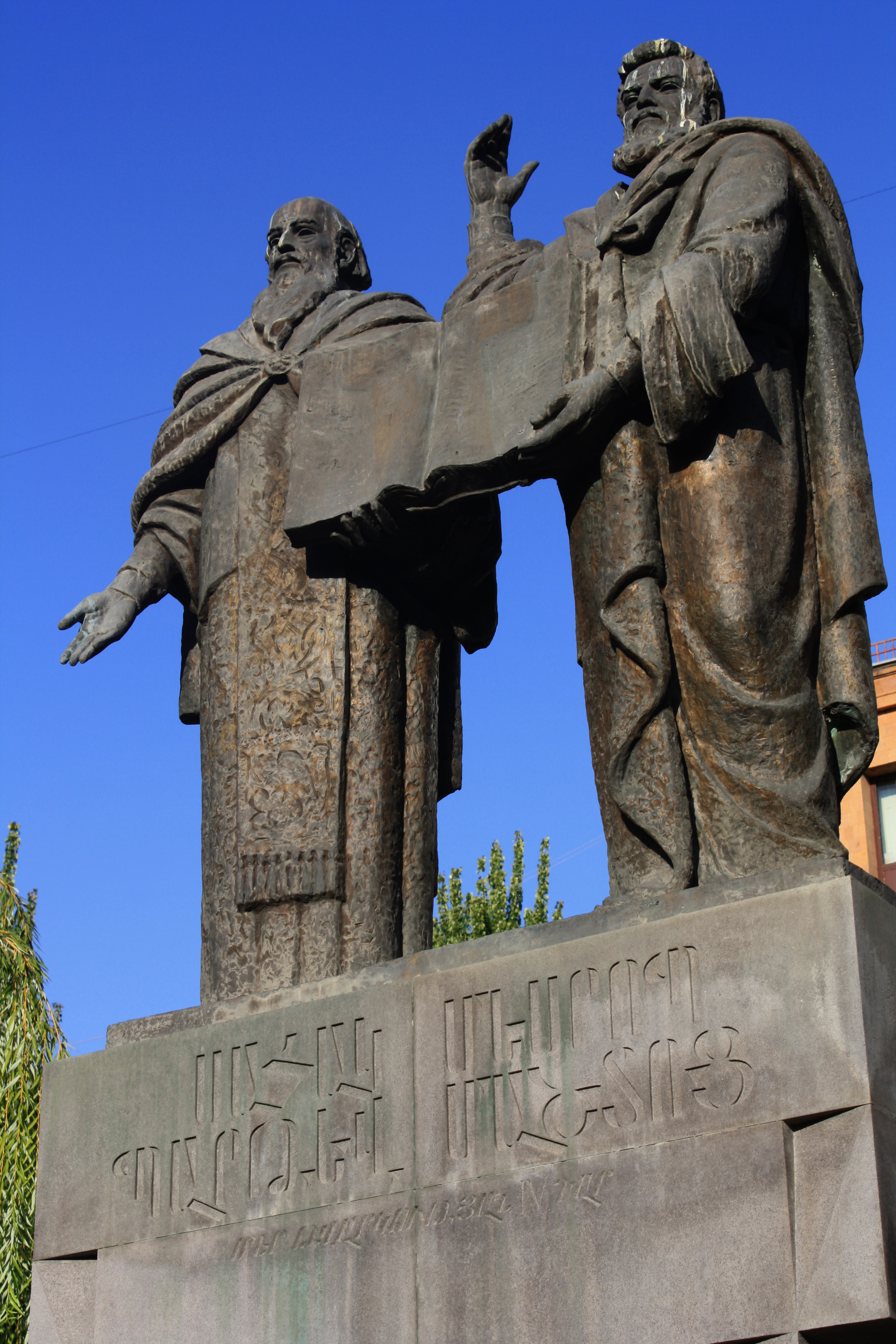
The statue of Mashtots and Sahak in front of Yerevan State University, erected in 2002.

The most recognizable statue of Mashtots, depicted with his disciple and biographer Koriun, is located in front of the Matenadaran and was erected by Ghukas Chubaryan in 1962. (Note: It appeared on the 1,000 Armenian dram banknote, in use between 1994 and 2004.) Although it was not immediately well-received, it is now a Yerevan landmark. A statue of Mashtots and Sahak, erected by Ara Sargsyan in the 1940s, (Note: Արա Սարգսյան, Մաշտոց և Սահակ, 1945; մրցանակաբաշխություն 1943, փայտից 1945, բրոնզից 1948) was put up in front of the main campus of Yerevan State University in 2002. Yervand Kochar created two sculptures of Mashtots in gypsum (1952) and plasticine (1953). Ara Sargsyan created a bronze plaquette in 1957/59. A statue of Mashtots and Koriun, by Levon Tokmajyan (1978–79), was erected near the central square of Ejmiatsin (Vagharshapat).

Statues, busts and sculptures of Mashtots have been erected in the Armenian diaspora, including in historical communities such as at the seminary in Jerusalem's Armenian Quarter, the library of the Vank Cathedral in New Julfa, Isfahan, Iran, the Melkonian Educational Institute in Nicosia, Cyprus and in newly-established communities, such as on the Armenian Cathedral of Moscow (2013) and in Alfortville, Paris (2015). In Akhalkalaki, the center of the Armenian-populated Javakheti region of Georgia, the statue of Soviet leader Vladimir Lenin was replaced with that of Mashtots in 1992.

=== Literature and music ===
Mashtots has featured prominently in Armenian poetry. In one poem («Սուրբ Մեսրովբի տոնին»), the mid-19th century poet Mikayel Nalbandian ranked him above Moses. In another, Nalbandian lamented the state of the church in Oshakan where Mashtots is buried. In his 1912 poem "St. Mashtots", Siamanto compared him to Moses and called him "God of Thought." In a 1913 poem, Hovhannes Tumanyan, Armenia's national poet, praised Mashtots and Sahak as luminaries. Paruyr Sevak, a celebrated Soviet Armenian poet, characterized Mashtots as a great statesman who won a "bloodless battle, which cannot be compared to any of the victories of our glorious commanders" in a 1962 poem. It was set to stage in 2011. A popular poem by Silva Kaputikyan, "Words for my Son", reads: "By Mesrop's holy genius, it [the Armenian language] has become letter and parchment; it has become hope, become a flag."

In the early 1970s, the popular song "Glorious Nation" («Ազգ փառապանծ»), written by Arno Babajanian and Ashot Grashi, and frequently performed by Raisa Mkrtchyan, included the line "The powerful language of Mashtots is the bright hope of every Armenian."

== See also ==
- Bible translations

== Bibliography ==
=== Books on Mashtots ===
- Acharian, Hrachia (1984). Հայոց գրերը [The Armenian Letters] (in Armenian). Yerevan: Hayastan Publishing. (archived)
- Leo (1962). Մեսրոպ Մաշտոց [Mesrop Mashtots] (in Armenian). Yerevan: Yerevan University Press.; originally published as: Leo (1904). Ս. Մեսրոպ [St. Mesrop]. Սահակ Մեսրոպեան մատենադարան (in Armenian). Tiflis: Hermes.
- Abeghian, Manuk (1980). "Mesrop Mashtots, the Inventor of the Armenian Alphabet and the Origin of Literature". "The Life of Mashtots" by Koryun. Translated by P. Mesrobian. Yerevan University Press. pp. 224–259.
- Aghaian, Ed. B. (1986). Mesrop Mashtots. Yerevan University Press. p. 14.
- Koriun (1994). Matevosyan, Artashes (ed.). Վարք Մեսրոպ Մաշտոցի [The Life of Mesrop Mashtots] (PDF) (in Armenian). Yerevan: Hayastan. With 1941 introduction and translation into modern Armenian by Manuk Abeghian.
- Sholinyan, Mariam (2003). Մեսրոպ Մաշտոց և հայոց գրեր [Mesrop Mashtots and the Armenian Alphabet] (in Armenian). Yerevan: Zangak-97. ISBN 978-99930-2-668-6.

=== Books cited in the article ===
- Kurkjian, Vahan (1964) [1958]. "Successors of Trdat — Partition of Armenia". A History of Armenia. New York: Armenian General Benevolent Union of America. pp. 131-135.
- Nersessian, Vrej (2001). Treasures from the Ark: 1700 Years of Armenian Christian Art. Los Angeles: J. Paul Getty Museum. ISBN 9780892366392.
- Panossian, Razmik (2006). The Armenians: From Kings and Priests to Merchants and Commissars. New York: Columbia University Press. ISBN 9780231139267.
- Redgate, A. E. (2000). The Armenians. Oxford: Blackwell Publishing. ISBN 9780631220374.
- Bournoutian, George (2006). A Concise History of the Armenian People (5th ed.). Costa Mesa, California: Mazda Publishers.
- Payaslian, Simon (2007). The History of Armenia. New York: Palgrave Macmillan. ISBN 978-1-4039-7467-9.
- Thomson, Robert W. (1997). "Armenian Literary Culture Through the Eleventh Century". In Hovannisian, Richard G. (ed.). The Armenian People From Ancient To Modern Times Volume I: The Dynastic Periods: From Antiquity to the Fourteenth Century. New York: St. Martin's Press. pp. 199–239.
- Russell, James R. (2004). Armenian and Iranian Studies. Cambridge, Massachusetts: Harvard University Press.
- Abrahamian, Levon (2006). Armenian Identity in a Changing World. Mazda Publishers. ISBN 1-56859-185-3.
- Barry, James (2018). Armenian Christians in Iran: Ethnicity, Religion, and Identity in the Islamic Republic. Cambridge University Press. ISBN 9781108429047.
- Zekiyan, Boghos Levon (2005). "Christianity to modernity". In Herzig, Edmund; Kurkchiyan, Marina (eds.). The Armenians: Past and Present in the Making of National Identity. RoutledgeCurzon. pp. 41–64. ISBN 0-203-00493-0.

=== Encyclopedia articles ===
- Ishkhanian, Rafayel (1981). "Մեսրոպ Մաշտոց [Mesrop Mashtots]". Soviet Armenian Encyclopedia Vol. 7 (in Armenian). pp. 469–471.

=== Journal articles ===
- Malkhasyants, Stepan (1946). "Մեսրոպ Մաշտոցի ծագման մասին [On the Background of Mesrop Mashtots]". Etchmiadzin (in Armenian). 3 (2–3): 55–58. Archived from the original on 2022-08-08.
- Yeghiazaryan, Vano [in Armenian] (2017). "Մեսրոպ Մաշտոցը՝ Մամիկոնյան տոհմի ազնվական [Mesrop Mashtots as a nobleman of Mamikonyan dynasty]". Etchmiadzin (in Armenian). 74 (1): 51–58.
- Teryan, Vahan vardapet (1963). "Օշականի Սուրբ Մեսրոպ-Մաշտոց եկեղեցին". Etchmiadzin (in Armenian). 20 (3). Mother See of Holy Etchmiadzin: 22–29.
- Kostandian, Emma [in Armenian] (2005). "Մեսրոպ Մաշտոցն ու գրերի գյուտը Մաղաքիա Օրմանյանի գնահատությամբ (Գրերի գյուտի 1600-ամյակին) [Assessment of Mesrop Mashtots and the Creation of the Armenian Alphabet by Maghakia Ormanian]". Lraber Hasarakakan Gitutyunneri (in Armenian) (2): 109–117.
- Mnatsakanian, Asatur [in Armenian] (1979). "Մաշտոց անվան ստուգաբանությունը [Etymology of the name Mashtots]". Lraber Hasarakakan Gitutyunneri (in Armenian) (8): 81–93.
- Simonian, Gevorg (1988). "Մաշտոցի անվան ծագման շուրջը [On the question of the origin of Mashtots' name]". Lraber Hasarakakan Gitutyunneri (in Armenian) (5): 62–72. Archived from the original on 2022-08-08.
- Gyurjinyan, David [in Armenian] (2014). "Մեսրոպ Մաշտոց անվան բաղադրիչներով կազմված բառերի ստեղծման ժամանակը եւ հեղինակները [Time and authors of the creation of words composed of the components of the name Mesrop Mashtots]". Etchmiadzin (in Armenian). 71 (2): 79–92.
- Ghazarian, M. M. [in Armenian] (1962). "Մեսրոպ Մաշտոցը հայկական կերպարվեստում [Mesrop Mashtots in Armenian Fine Arts]". Patma-Banasirakan Handes (in Armenian) (2): 62–72.
- Hovhannissian, A. G. (1962). "Մաշտոցյան գրերի պատմական նշանակությունը [The Historic Importance of the Mashtots Letters]". Patma-Banasirakan Handes (in Armenian) (2): 3–14.

Unsorted

- Yuzbašyan, Karen (2011). "L'invention de l'alphabet arménien". Revue des Études Arméniennes. 33: 67–129. doi:10.2143/REA.33.0.2144981.
- Yuzbašyan, Karen (1995). "Le destin de l'alphabet de Daniēl en Arménie". Revue des Études Arméniennes. 25: 171–181. doi:10.2143/REA.25.0.2003780.
- Markwart, Josef (1917). Ueber den Ursprung des armenischen Alphabets in Verbindung mit der Biographie des heil. Maštocʻ. Vienna: Mechitharisten-Buchdruckerei.
- Feydit, Frédéric (1964). Considérations sur l'alphabet de Saint Mesrop. Vienna: Mechitharisten-Buchdruckerei. OCLC 460351913.
- Ačaṙean, Hračʿya (1984). Հայոց գրերը [The Armenian alphabet] (2 ed.). Yerevan University Press.
- Winkler, Gabriele (1994). Koriwns Biographie des Mesrop Maštocʻ : Übersetzung und Kommentar. Rome: Pontificio istituto orientale. ISBN 9788872102985.

Attribution
