= Șoldănești District =

Șoldănești
- District (Raion)
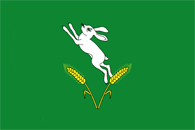
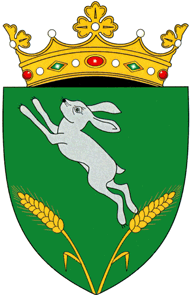
- Flag Coat of arms

- Coordinates: 47°50′N 28°40′E
- Country: Republic of Moldova
- Established: 2002
- Administrative center (Oraş-reşedinţă): Șoldănești

Government
  - Raion president: Aliona Pînzari (PAS, 2023)

Area
  - Total: 598.4 km^{2} (231.0 sq mi)
  - Water: 8.43 km^{2} (3.25 sq mi) 1.40%
- Elevation: 338 m (1,109 ft)

Population (2024)
  - Total: 36,743
  - Density: 61.40/km^{2} (159.0/sq mi)
- Time zone: UTC+2 (EET)
  - Summer (DST): UTC+3 (EEST)
- Area code: +373 72
- Car plates: SD
- Website: soldanesti.md

Șoldănești (Romanian pronunciation: [ʃoldəˈneʃtʲ]) is a district (Romanian: raion) in the northeast of Moldova, with the administrative center at Șoldănești. As of the 2024 Moldovan census, the district population was 25,394.

== History ==
The localities with the earliest documentary attestation are Dobrușa, Olișcani, Răspopeni, and Salcia, which were certified in the period 1437–1448. The 16th–18th centuries were marked by continued economic (trade, crafts) and cultural (churches, monasteries) development, and a marked increase in population. During the late 18th and early 19th centuries, the region's economic decay occurs as a result of the constant wars led by Poland, the Ottoman Empire, and the Russian Empire for influence in the region. In 1812, the Treaty of Bucharest divided Bessarabia from the Principality of Moldova, the former being ceded to Russia. In 1918, after the collapse of the Russian Empire, the Union of Bessarabia with Romania occurred. During the interwar period (1918–1940) the district was part of Soroca County, in the Kingdom of Romania. After the Molotov–Ribbentrop Pact of August 1939, Bessarabia was occupied by the Soviet Union in June 1940. From 1941 to 1944 it was part of Romania again, and afterwards it became the Moldavian Soviet Socialist Republic. In 1991, as a result of the proclamation of the Independence of Moldova, the district became part of Soroca County (1991–2003), and in 2003 it became an administrative unit of Moldova.

== Geography ==
The Șoldănești district is located in north-eastern Moldova. It neighbors to north and west the Florești District, in the north-east the Camenca District, in the east the Rîbnița District, and in the south the Telenești and Rezina districts. The territory is located within the Dniester Plateau, the relief is moderately, fragmented and represented by plateaus, low hills and dales wide and hilly interfluvial shaped strings. Sometimes come across isolated dome-shaped hills. On the plateau widespread erosion and landslides occur. In the district high fertility soils are characterized by particularly prevalent in typical chernozem, leachates, and carbonated ordinary, gray and brown soil of forest closed. Average reliability of the soil according to the Land Register of the Republic of Moldova is 74-point average of districts of 63 points. Maximum altitude in the district is the hill Zahorna, with 338 m (1,109 ft).

=== Climate ===
The climate is temperate continental, with average temperature in January −4.5 °C (24 °F), and 21 °C (70 °F) in July; the average annual precipitation is 500–560 mm. The average wind speed is 4–6 m/s.

=== Fauna ===
The fauna of the district is typical of Central Europe; it is characterized by: foxes, hedgehogs, hares, wild boars, deer, wildcats, and wolves. Birds include: quail, egrets, hawks, storks, crows, seagulls, and others.

=== Flora ===
Forests occupy 19.3% of the district and are complemented by oak, ash, lime, hornbeam, acacia, and others. Plants include: nettle, fescue, clover, wormwood, bells, and others.

=== Natural resources ===
The main mineral resources located in the district are metallic resources. Most of the stock is near Mihuleni – limestone. Olișcani deposits – gravel. Șoldănești, Olișcani, Mihuleni, Vadul-Rașcov – clay. Alcedar, Dobrușa, Răspopeni – sand.

=== Rivers ===
The district is located in the Nistru River basin; the river Ciorna is the main river in the district. There are many sources of drinking water; groundwater is at depths between 0.5 m and 10–15 m.

== Administrative subdivisions ==
- Localities: 33
  - Administrative center: Șoldănești
    - Cities: Șoldănești
      - Villages: 10
        - Communes: 22

== Demographics ==
In the 2024 Census, the district population was 25,394, of which 18.9% urban and 81.1% rural population.

=== Ethnic groups ===
Ethnic group	% of total
Moldovans *	93.6
Romanians *	4.6
Ukrainians	1.1
Russians	0.4
Romani	0.2
Other	0.1
Undeclared	0.0

Footnote: * There is an ongoing controversy regarding the ethnic identification of Moldovans and Romanians.

=== Religion ===
- Christians – 99.7%
  - Orthodox Christians – 98.7%
  - Protestant – 1.0%
- Other – 0.1%
- No Religion – 0.1%
- Not Declared - 0.1%

== Economy ==
Being a predominantly agricultural district, the main efforts are focused on supporting and developing priority directions of agriculture. Arable land constitutes – 32 351 ha (54.4%), perennial plantations – 3544 ha (5.9%), pastures – 4761 ha (8.0%). Industrial enterprises of all types of ownership manufactured in January–September 2010 production of 6.846 million lei worth at current prices. The volume index of industrial production from January–September 2009 was (in comparable prices) 96.6%.

== Education ==
In the district there are 31 educational institutions working with 5,242 students. In the educational institutions operating in the district there are currently 509 teachers. Preschool – 28, children in kindergarten – 1,458, teachers – 152.

== Politics ==
The Șoldănești district is a district with a preponderance of right-wing parties. AEI get good results here, but PCRM is in a constant percentage decrease. During 2001–2009, the district was a predominantly communist (over 50%). District is one of the founding members of Euroregion Dniester.

During the last three elections AEI had an increase of 76.6%

Parliament elections results
Year	AEI	PCRM
2010	52.19% 10,382	40.95% 8,145
July 2009	49.10% 9,467	44.90% 8,657
April 2009	30.70% 5,879	55.54% 10,634

=== Elections ===
Summary of 28 November 2010 Parliament of Moldova election results in Șoldănești District
Parties and coalitions	Votes	%	+/−
Party of Communists of the Republic of Moldova	8,145	40.95	−3.95
Liberal Democratic Party of Moldova	6,310	31.72	+17.91
Democratic Party of Moldova	2,486	12.50	-0.16
Liberal Party	1,239	6.23	−2.27
European Action Movement	408	2.05	+2.05
Party Alliance Our Moldova	347	1.74	−12.39
Christian Democratic People's Party	313	1.57	−2.58
Other Party	650	3.24	+1.39
Total (turnout 60.94%)	20,082	100.00	

== Culture ==
The district works: amateur artistic groups – 124, of which 13 bands as "model", public libraries – 34 of them five children, schools of music – 2, the school district fine arts – 1. 82 craftsmen working in the district of its four members of the craftsmen.

== Health ==
Works: a hospital with general fund of 135 beds, the center of family doctor in the composition of which are 12 family physician offices, 3 health centers, two health centers and 7 autonomous health offices.

== Personalities ==
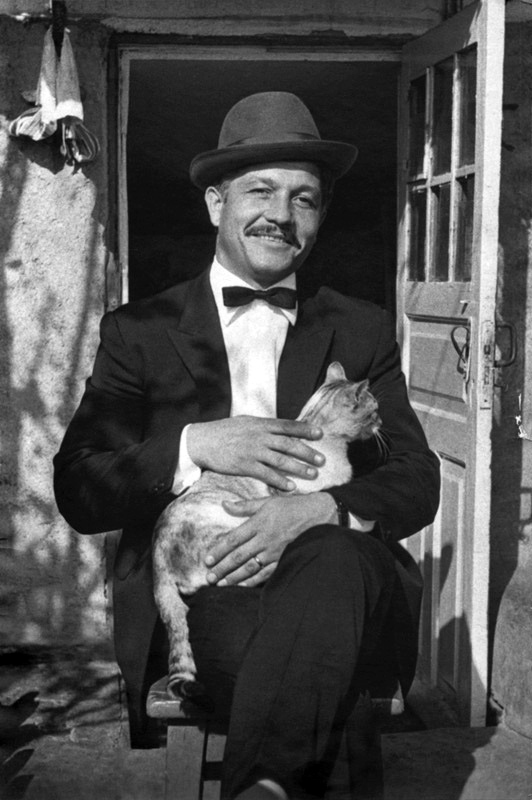
Mihai Volontir in a 1960s film

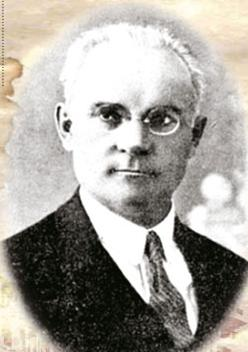
Teofil Ioncu

- Andrei Lupan – Writer, politician and chairman of Moldovan Writers' Union (1946–1955; 1958–1961).
- Dumitru Matcovschi – Writer and member of the Academy of Sciences of Moldova, He was a founder of the Popular Front of Moldova
- Mihai Volontir – Actor
- Simeon G. Murafa – Politician and director of the newspaper Cuvânt moldovenesc
- Teofil Ioncu – Bessarabian politician
