= Socola =

Socola may refer to:

- Socola, a quarter in the Romanian city of Iași
- the Socola Monastery, part of the Iași quarter
- Socola, a village in Vadul-Rașcov Commune, Șoldănești district, Moldova
