= Saint Mesrop Mashtots Church =

Armenian Apostolic church in Oshakan

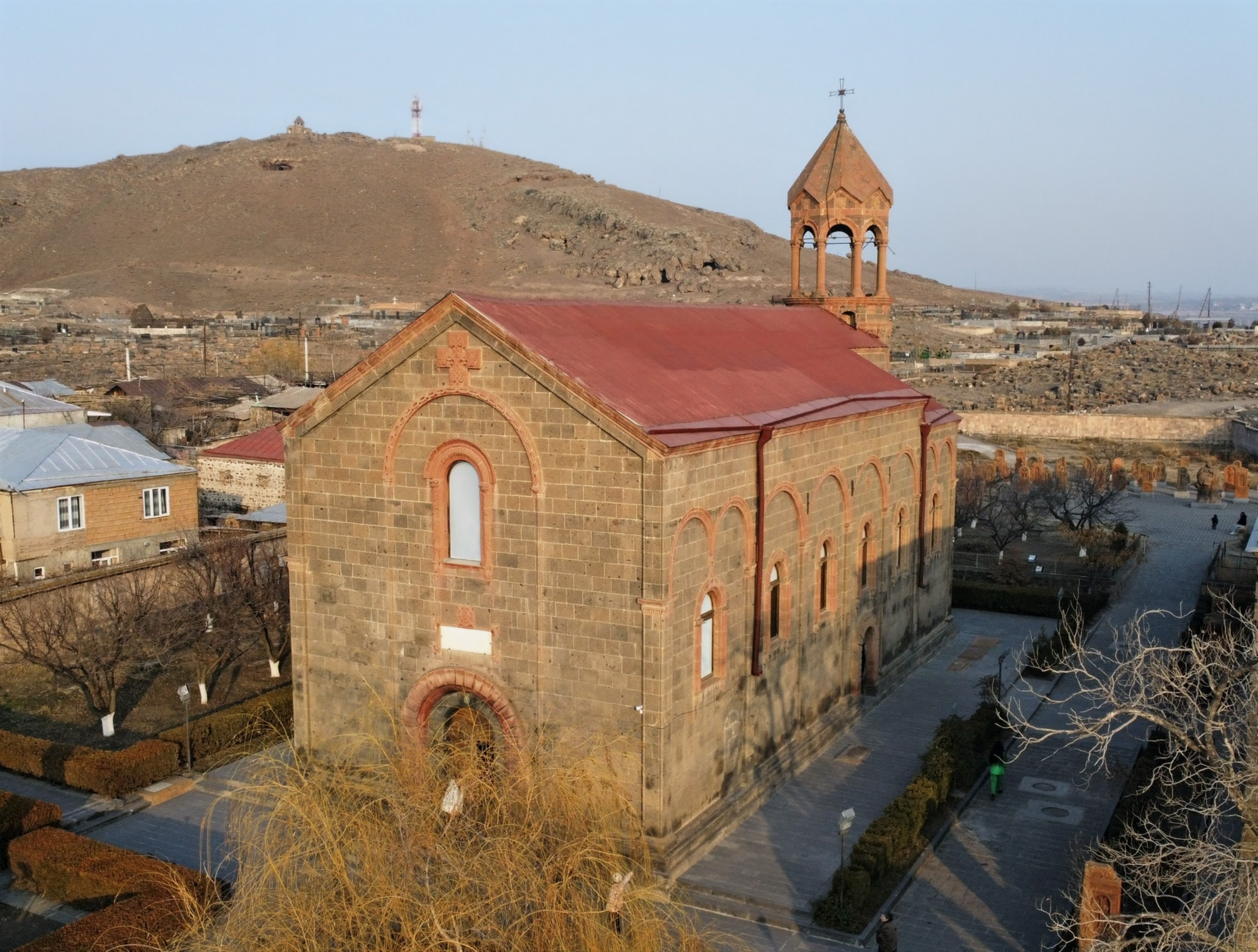
- The church in 2023

Religion
- Affiliation: Armenian Apostolic Church
- Year consecrated: October 21, 1879 (current church)

Location
- Location: Oshakan, Aragatsotn, Armenia
- Interactive map of Saint Mesrop Mashtots Church

Architecture
- Founder: Vahan Amatuni (original church); Catholicos Gevorg IV (current building)
- Groundbreaking: 443 (original); 1873 (current church)
- Completed: 1879 (current church)

Saint Mesrop Mashtots Church (Armenian: Սուրբ Մեսրոպ Մաշտոց եկեղեցի) is an Armenian Apostolic church in Oshakan that contains the grave of Mesrop Mashtots, the inventor of the Armenian alphabet. It is one of Armenia's better known churches and a pilgrimage site. Pilgrims visit the church on the Feast of the Holy Translators in October.

Mashtots was buried at the site in 440, where a martyrium was built three years later. The current church dates to 1873–1879, when an entirely new building was built on the grave of Mashtots, located under the altar. It has been the seat of the Diocese of Aragatsotn since 1996.

== Early history ==
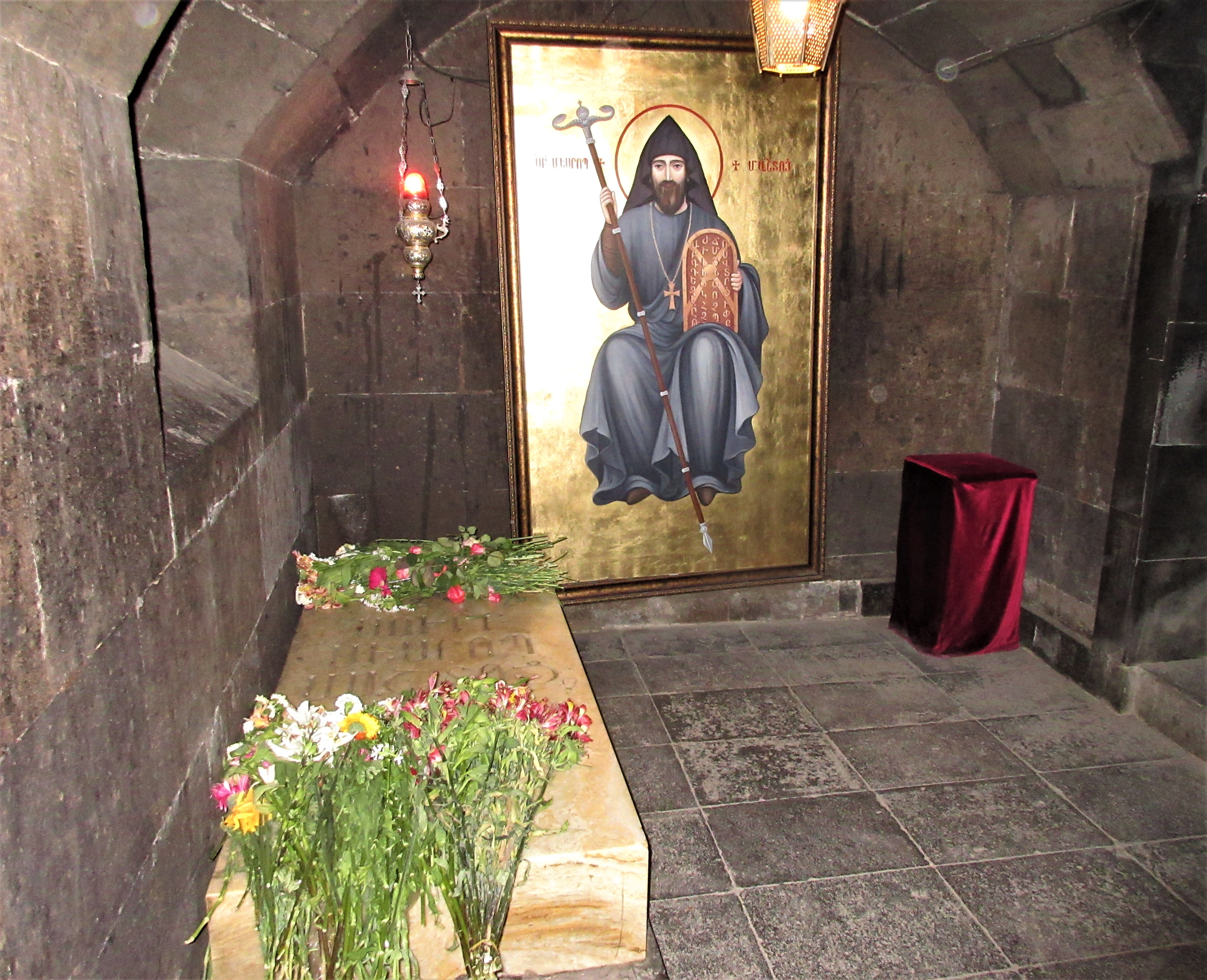
The tomb of Mashtots is located under the altar.

According to Movses Khorenatsi, when Mesrop Mashtots died (c. 440), three locations were considered for his burial place: his native Taron region; Goghtn, where he had begun his missionary work; and Vagharshapat, Armenia's political and religious capital, next to the graves of other saints. His body was eventually taken by Hmayeak Mamikonian, a military commander and the brother of Vardan Mamikonian, and Vahan Amatuni, Armenia's Persian-appointed hazarapet (chief of finances), to Oshakan, the latter's native village. This is also attested by Koriun, Mashtots' biographer, and Ghazar Parpetsi.

According to Koriun, Vahan Amatuni built an "altar" on the grave of Mashtots three years later, in 443. Hrachia Acharian interpreted it literally; he believed Amatuni simply added an altar in a pre-existing chapel. The modern view is that Vahan Amatuni built a temple, i.e. a martyrium or a chapel on Mashtots' grave. Elizabeth Redgate suggested that it was an underground martyrium.

Not much is known about the later history of the site until the modern period. In the early 19th century, Hovhannes Shahkhatuniants found five inscriptions at the church, four of which were dated 1285–1295. The inscriptions are believed to have been lost during the reconstruction of the 1870s. At least one inscription was left by Sahmadin, a wealthy Armenian, who apparently renovated the church.

The 17th-century historian Arakel of Tabriz wrote that the roof of the "temple-mausoleum" had entirely collapsed and that only the main altar was still extant. Catholicos Pilippos completely renovated the church between 1639 and 1645, but it was heavily dilapidated by the 19th century. Catholicos Nerses Ashtaraketsi made a failed attempt to renovate it in 1850. Mikayel Nalbandian, a writer and activist, visited Oshakan during his only visit to Armenia in 1860 and lamented its condition in a poem.

== Reconstruction ==
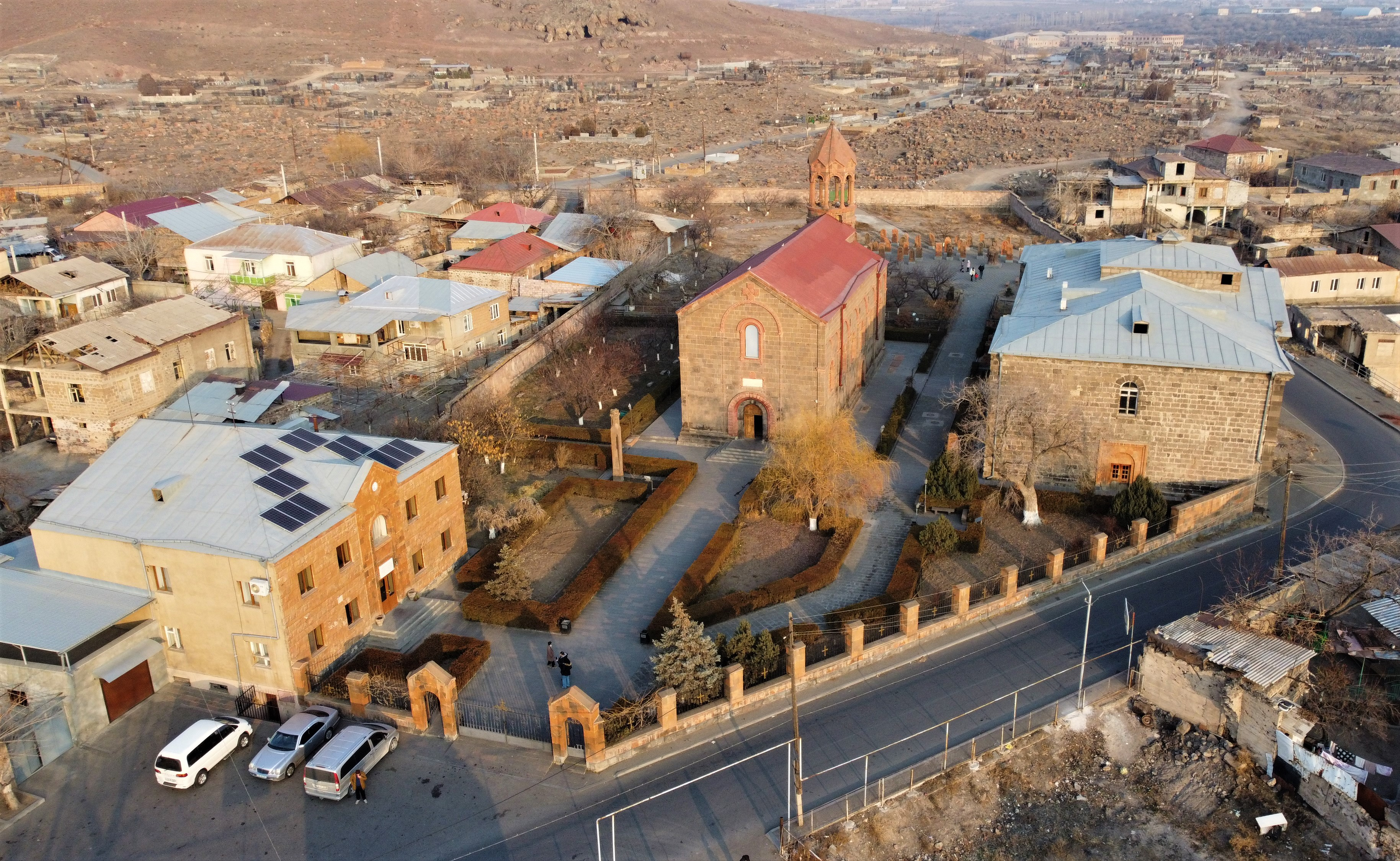
An aerial view of the complex

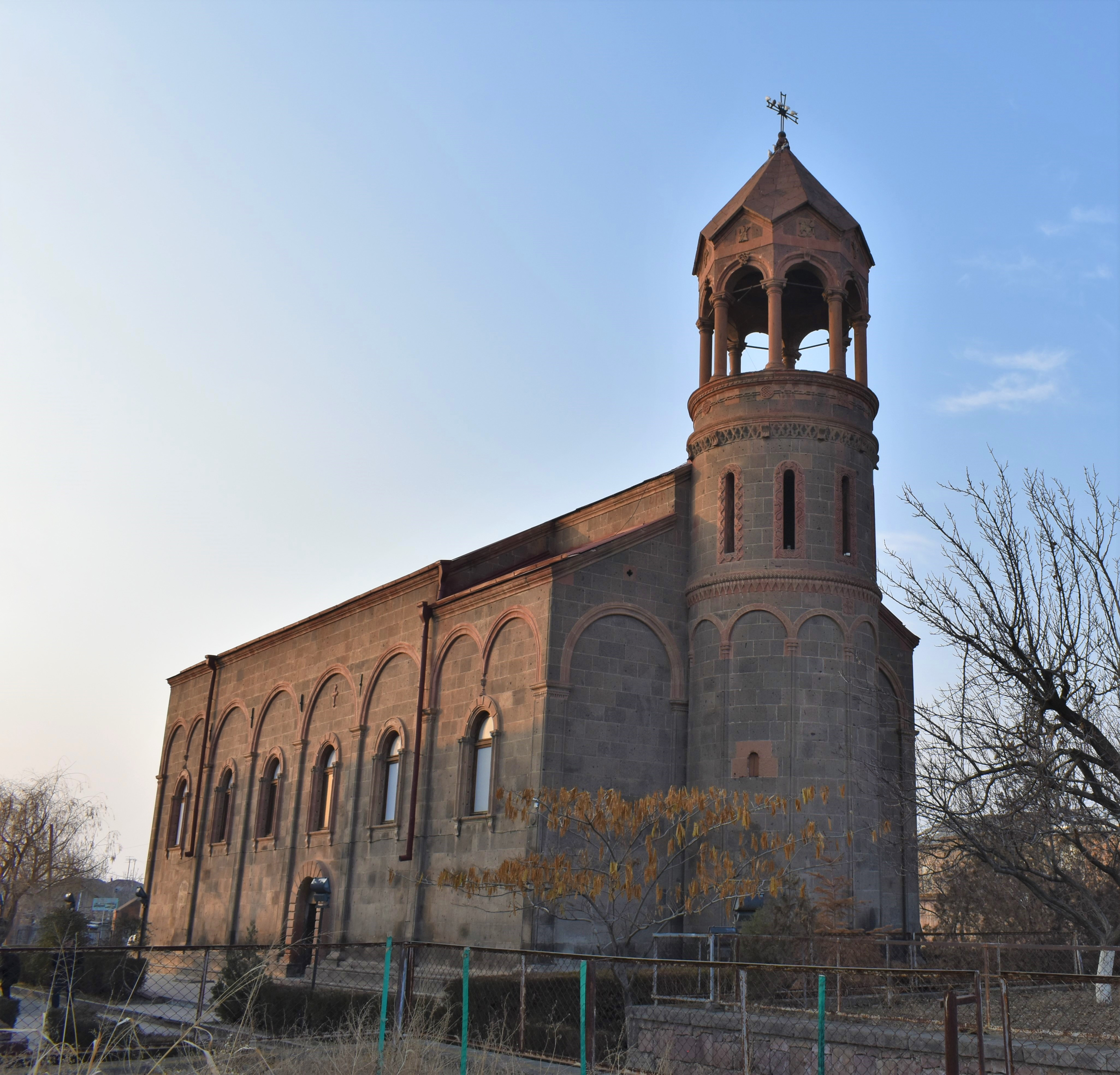
A view of the church and its cylindrical bell-tower

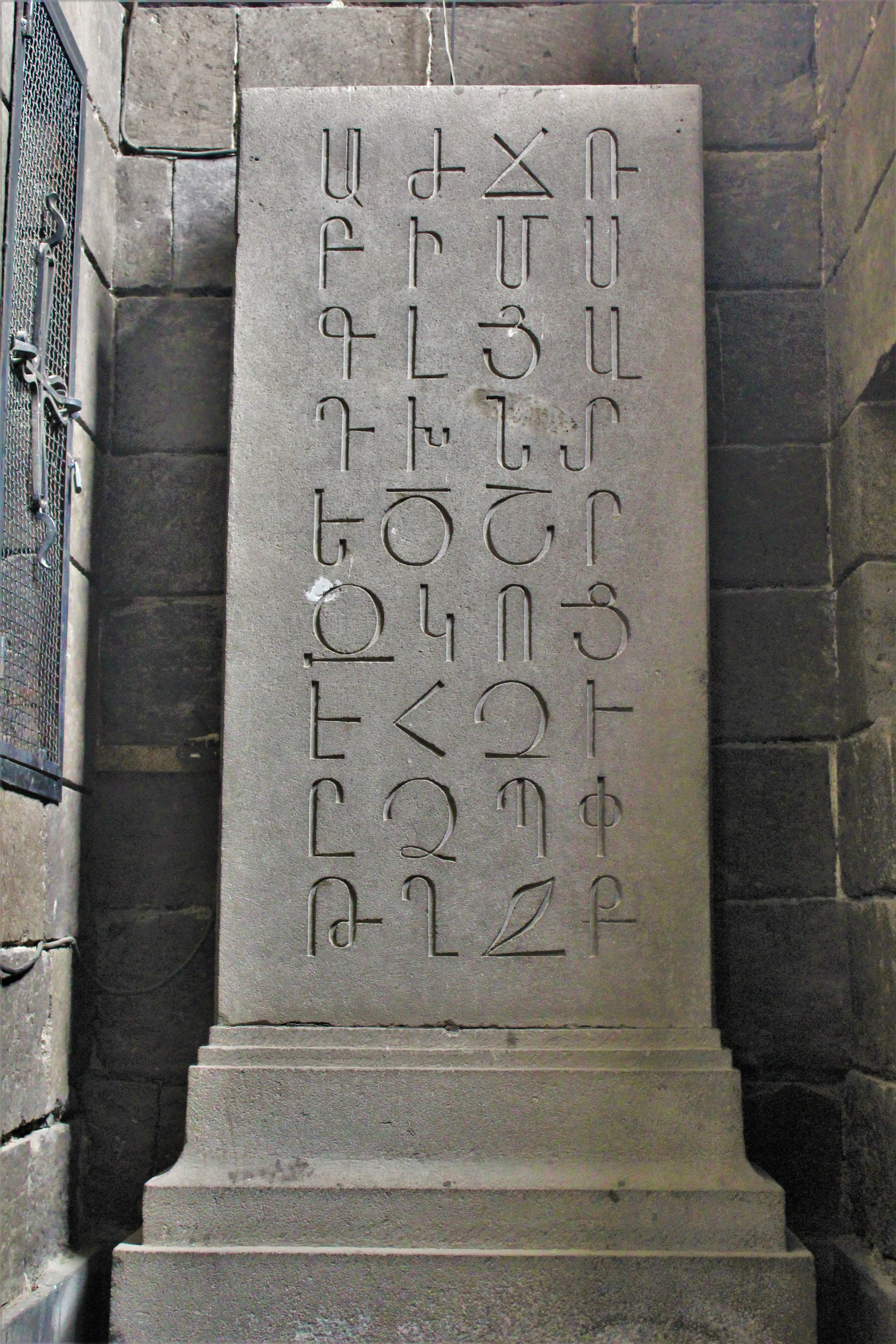
A memorial of the Armenian alphabet near the entrance to the grave of Mashtots

Catholicos Gevorg IV launched a reconstruction campaign in 1868. He successfully raised funds to rebuild the church. In 1872 he officially called upon the Armenian people to support the cause in a kondak (proclamation or encyclical). Construction began in the spring of 1873 and the new church was completed in 1879. It was consecrated on October 21, 1879. The new church, built by Greek workmen from Alexandropol (Gyumri), is a vaulted basilica built in black tuff. It has three entrances on the north, south, and west and eleven windows, not including the smaller windows on bell-tower. It has a capacity of 800 people. Acharian described it as a "mid-sized building, much more beautiful than usual rural churches, but lesser than churches of large cities."

The grave of Mashtots is located in a crypt under the main altar. In 1884 a new marble gravestone was erected through the funds of Archbishop Andreas, primate of the Artsakh Diocese. It was replaced with an Italian marble gravestone in 1962 that reads: Saint Mesrop Mashtots 361–440 (ՍՈՒՐԲ ՄԵՍՐՈՊ ՄԱՇՏՈՑ 361 ✝ 440).

A cylindrical bell-tower was added in 1884 on the eastern side of the church, crowned by a rotunda with eight columns. For its location on the eastern (as opposed to the usual western end) and cylindrical design, it is a rare example in Armenian architecture.

In 1880 a memorial was erected on the grave of Vahan Amatuni just outside the church.

== Later history ==
On October 13, 1912, Catholicos Gevorg V, other religious figures and common people traveled from Vagharshapat to Oshakan in a ceremonial procession as part of the celebrations of the 1,500 anniversary of the Armenian alphabet.

The church underwent extensive renovation in the 1960s, during the reign of Catholicos Vazgen I, through the financial support of Hayk and Torgom Ghazarosian brothers of Milan, Italy, originally from Yerznka (Erzincan). A monument depicting the original 36 letters of the Armenian alphabet, as created by Mashtots, in the erkatagir style, was erected near the entrance to the grave of Mashtots. It was designed by Baghdasar Arzoumanian. The floor of the church was covered with basalt tiles. A perimeter wall with a total length of 310 metres (1,020 ft) was built around the church in tuff. A drinking fountain designed by Rafael Israelyan was erected at the church courtyard in 1964.

The church was declared the seat of the Diocese of Aragatsotn in 1996. The prelacy building was unveiled in 1997. Ownership of the church building was transferred from the Armenian government to the church in July 2000.

The surrounding area of the church was renovated in 2000 through funding by Djivan Koboyan, an Armenian American philanthropist.

In August 2012 archaeologist Frina Babayan uncovered remains of the 5th-century structure near the foundations of the bell tower.

== Frescoes ==
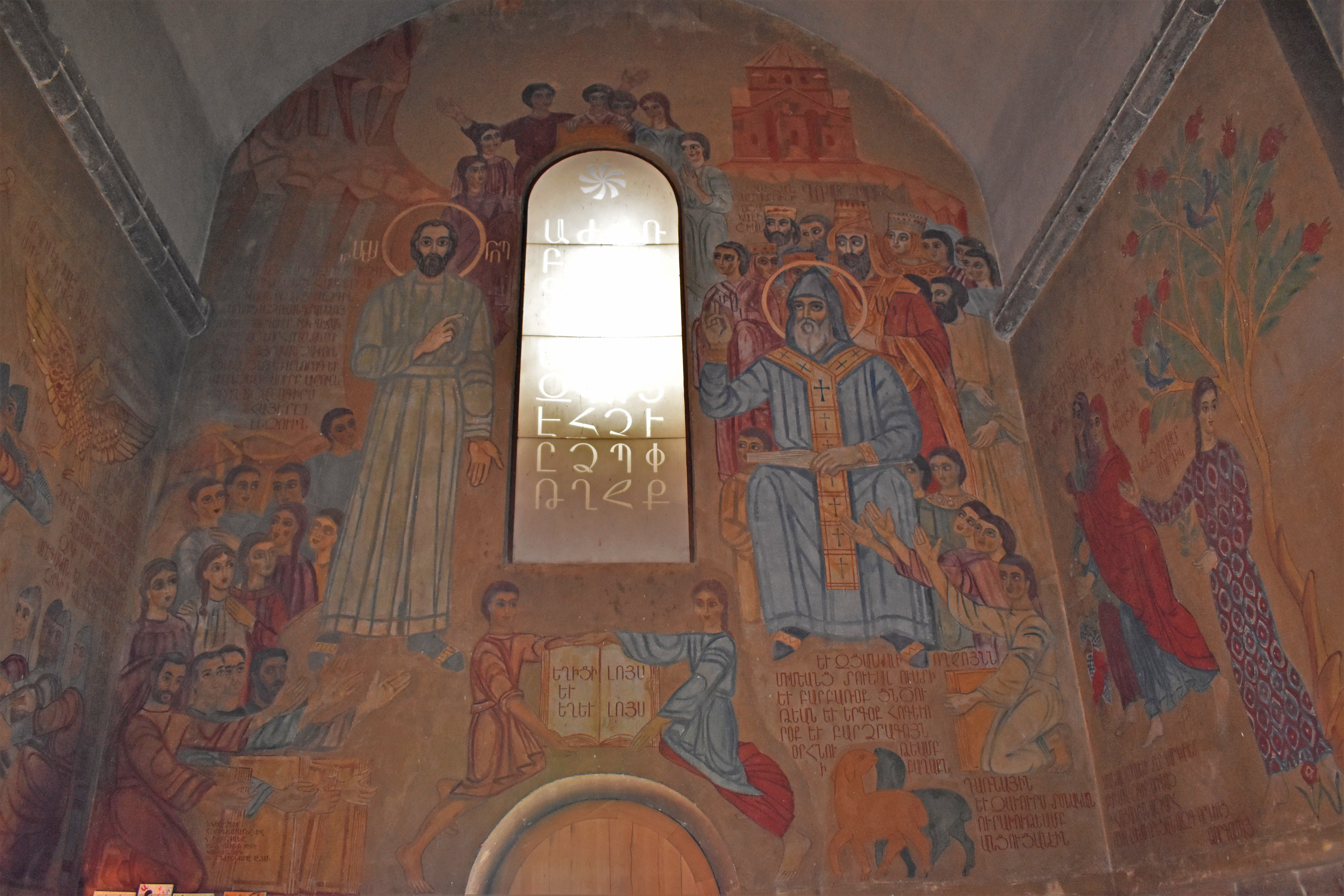
The central fresco depicting Mashtots and Sahak Partev

The interior of the church was covered with frescoes by Hovhannes Minasian and Henrik Mamian in 1961–1964. They created the monumental fresco Glory to Armenian Letters and Literature («Փառք հայ գրի և դպրության»), which depicts the invention of the Armenian alphabet. Major figures associated with Mashtots are included in it: Mashtots, Catholicos Sahak Partev, King Vramshapuh and prince Vahan Amatuni. Minasian also created the altarpiece, depicting the Virgin and Child, in 1966. The frescoes were restored in 2019–20 through funding from Armenia's President Armen Sarkissian.

== Dpratun ==
A school was established next to the church in 1913. It served as a public school during the Soviet period. The building was renovated in 1996-97 through the financial support of Djivan Koboyan, an Armenian American philanthropist, and was reopened on October 18, 1998. It serves as a dpratun (դպրատուն), a scientific and educational center, dedicated to Mashtots and the Armenian alphabet.

== Depictions ==
Rafael Atoyan depicted Armenia's national poet, Hovhannes Tumanyan, at the entrance of the church in a 1969 painting.

The 20th century Armenian writer Sero Khanzadyan called the church and Kanaker, the birthplace of Khachatur Abovian (1809–1848), as Armenia's two holy sites.
