= Stepanos Nersissian =

Armenian painter (1825–1884)

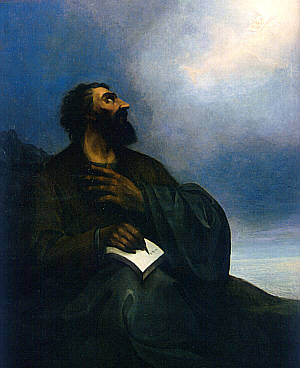
Mesrob Mashtots, inventor of the Armenian alphabet

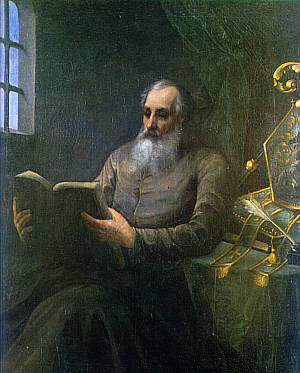
Isaac of Armenia

Stepanos Nersissian (Armenian: Ստեփանոս Ներսիսեան; 1815 – 4 April [O.S. 23 March] 1884) was an Armenian painter, primarily known for his portraits of historical figures.

== Life and works ==
He was born in Yerevan in 1815. From 1840 to 1842, he attended the Imperial Academy of Fine Arts in St. Petersburg where he studied with Alexander Sauerweid and Alexander Varnek; becoming exposed to the ideas of many of the upcoming intellectuals of that time, including Gabriel Sundukian and Ivan Aivazovsky. From 1846 to 1865, with some breaks, he taught painting at schools in Tbilisi and Shusha. During these years, he came to specialize in portraits and landscapes. His painting Holiday on the Banks of the Kura River (1860) is considered to be the starting point of a new period in Armenian art. Many of his early portraits show the influence of the Hovnatanians, a prominent family of miniaturist painters. Later portraits, beginning with that of General Vasili Bebutov (1857), and culminating with those of Mesrop Mashtots and Sahak Parthev (both 1882), connect early 19th century Armenian painting with developments of the second half. He died on 4 April 1884.

Many of his surviving works are maintained in the National Gallery of Armenia (HAP). They may also be seen at the Art Museum of Georgia and the State Museum of Oriental Art.

== Sources ==
- Ghazaryan, M. (1982). "Ներսիսյան" [Nersisyan]. Հայկական սովետական հանրագիտարան, հատոր 8 [Armenian Soviet Enycyclopedia, vol. 8]. p. 280.
