= Euroregion Dniester =

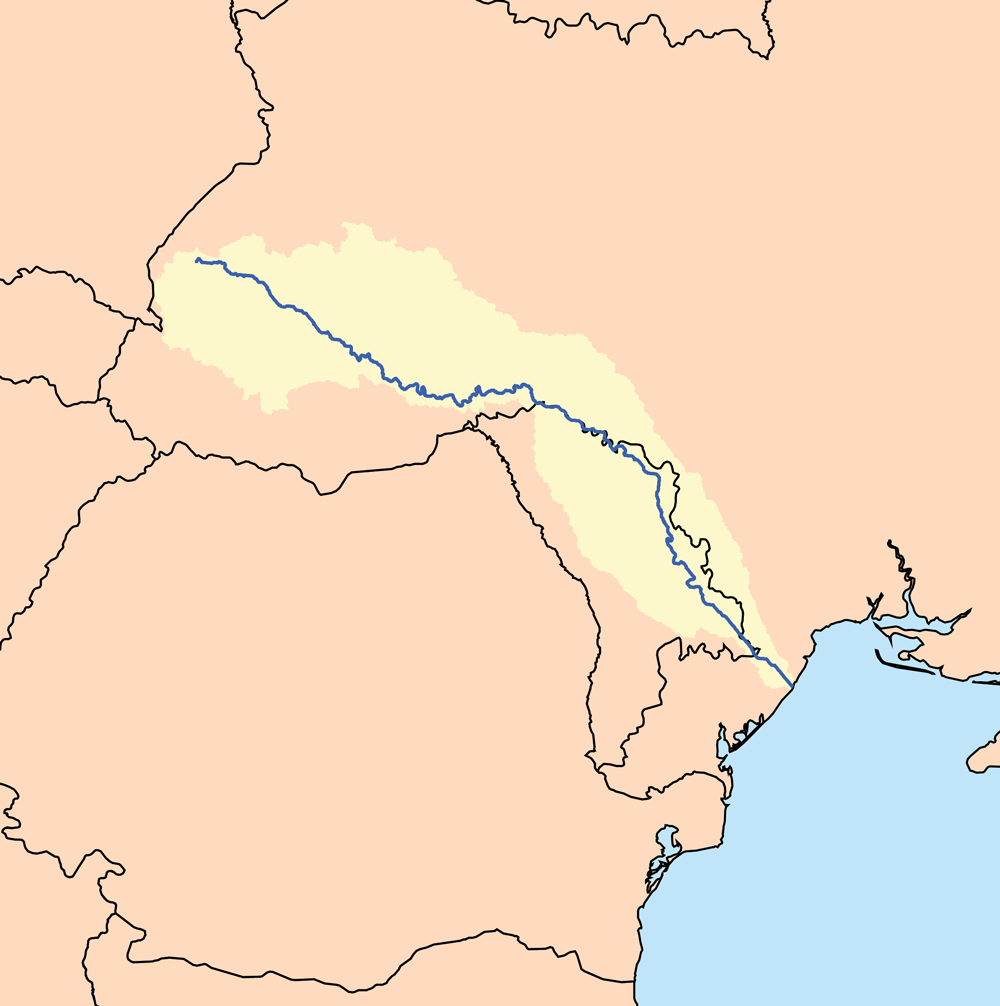
- Dniester river
- Abbreviation: ERD
- Formation: 2012
- Type: Euroregion
- Headquarters: Vinnytsia (Ukraine)
- Region served: Dniester
- Official language: English, Russian
- Website: dniester.eu

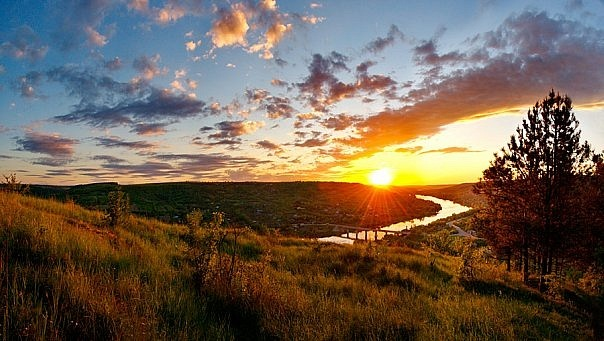
Dniester in Mohyliv-Podilskyi

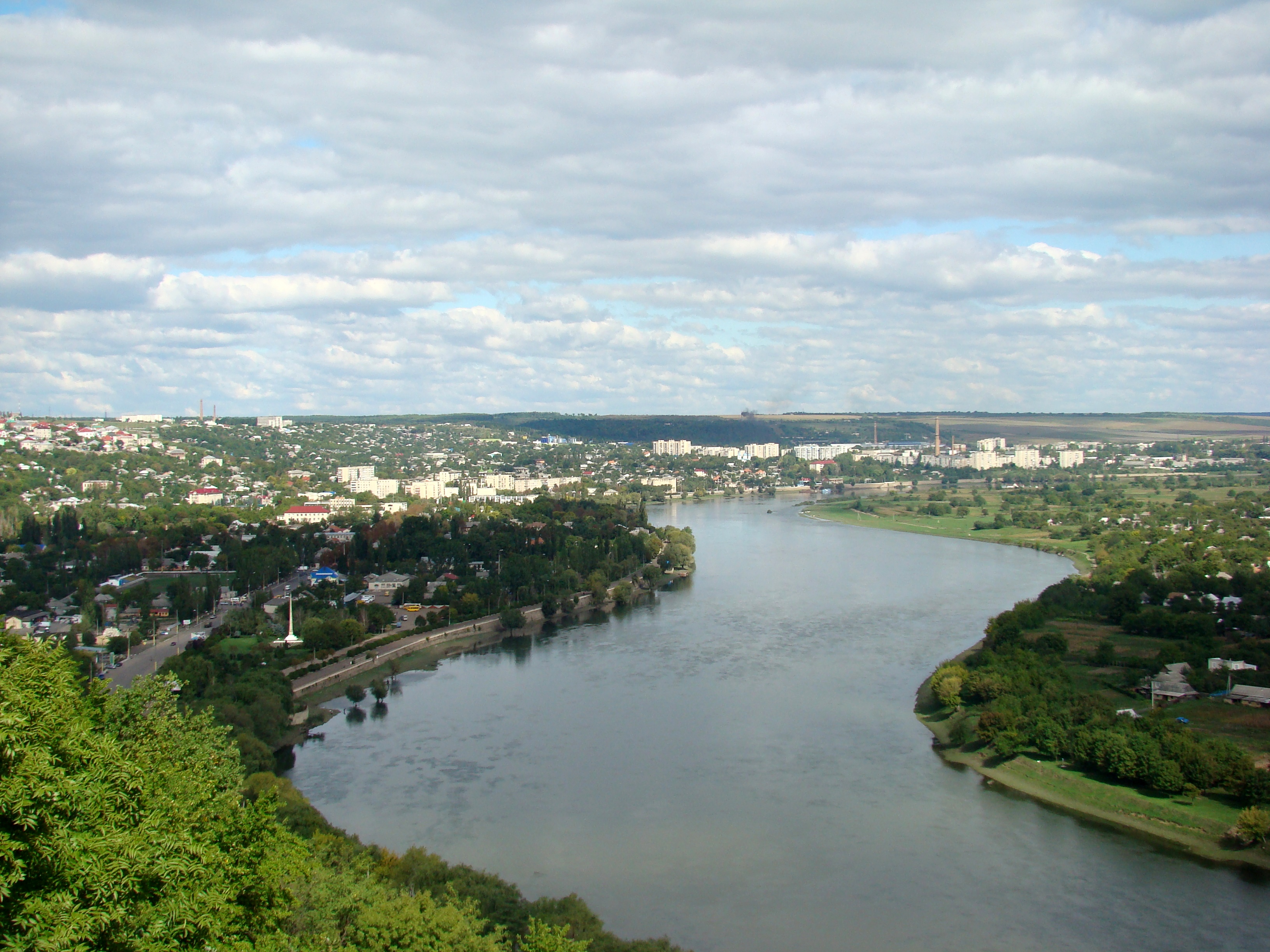
Dniester in Soroca

Euroregion Dniester (Romanian: Euroregiunea Nistru; Russian: Еврорегион «Днестр»; Ukrainian: Єврорегіон «Дністер») is a euroregion located in Moldova and Ukraine. It was established in February 2012.

== Establishment ==
On a meeting held in capital of Ukraine Kyiv on 2 February 2012, representatives of Vinnytsia region from Ukraine and the six districts of the Republic of Moldova have consolidated official agreement on the establishment of the Euroregion "Dniester". The corresponding agreement was signed by the Head of Vinnytsia Regional Council Sergiy Tatusiak and the Head of Vinnytsia Regional State Administration Mykola Dzhyga and six Heads of district Councils of the Republic of Moldova: Ocnita, Soroca, Floresti, Soldanesti, Rezina, Donduseni.

The signing took place during the official visit to Kyiv the Prime Minister of Moldova Vlad Filat and the official delegation consisting of officials and leaders from individual regions of the country.

On 28 February 2013, Dubasari district of Republic of Moldova joined the Euroregion.

The official place of the registration of the Euroregion "Dniester" is Vinnytsia (Ukraine) where the Coordinating Centre will be located, and its Mission office - in Soroca (the Republic of Moldova).

== Geography ==
Territory – 34 218 km2

Population – 2 050 thousand people

== Purpose ==
Euroregion "Dniester" is created as a body of cross-border cooperation, as an association of local administrative-territorial units of Ukraine and the Republic of Moldova.

The main purpose of the creation and activity of the Euroregion "Dniester" is the implementation of programs for harmonized and complex development of territories adjacent to the river Dniester.

The parties will cooperate, within their competence, to implement the following objectives:

- organization, coordination and developing relations in the sphere of economy, science, education, culture, tourism, sport;

- implementation of joint projects concerning environmental protection, ecological improvement of Dniester river basin;

- realization of common cross-border investment projects;

- implementation of regional projects (programs) for reducing unemployment among the population of border areas by increasing the economic potential;

- organization of contacts with international organizations, funds, institutes, agencies and other organizations.

In November 2012 parties set as their priorities for cooperation construction of a bridge over the Dniester in Yampil Raion and water purification systems in the towns of Soroca and Mohyliv-Podilskyi.

== See also ==
- Euroregion
- List of Euroregions
- Eurodistrict
