= Salcia, Șoldănești =

Salcia
- Commune
- Location within Moldova
- Coordinates: 47°56′57″N 28°44′06″E
- Country: Moldova
- District: Șoldănești District

Government
  - Mayor: Alexandru Carpovici (PLDM)

Population (2014)
  - Total: 973
- Time zone: UTC+2 (EET)
  - Summer (DST): UTC+3 (EEST)

Salcia is a commune in Șoldănești District, Moldova. It is composed of two villages, Lelina and Salcia.
