= Dobrușa, Șoldănești =

Dobrușa
- Commune
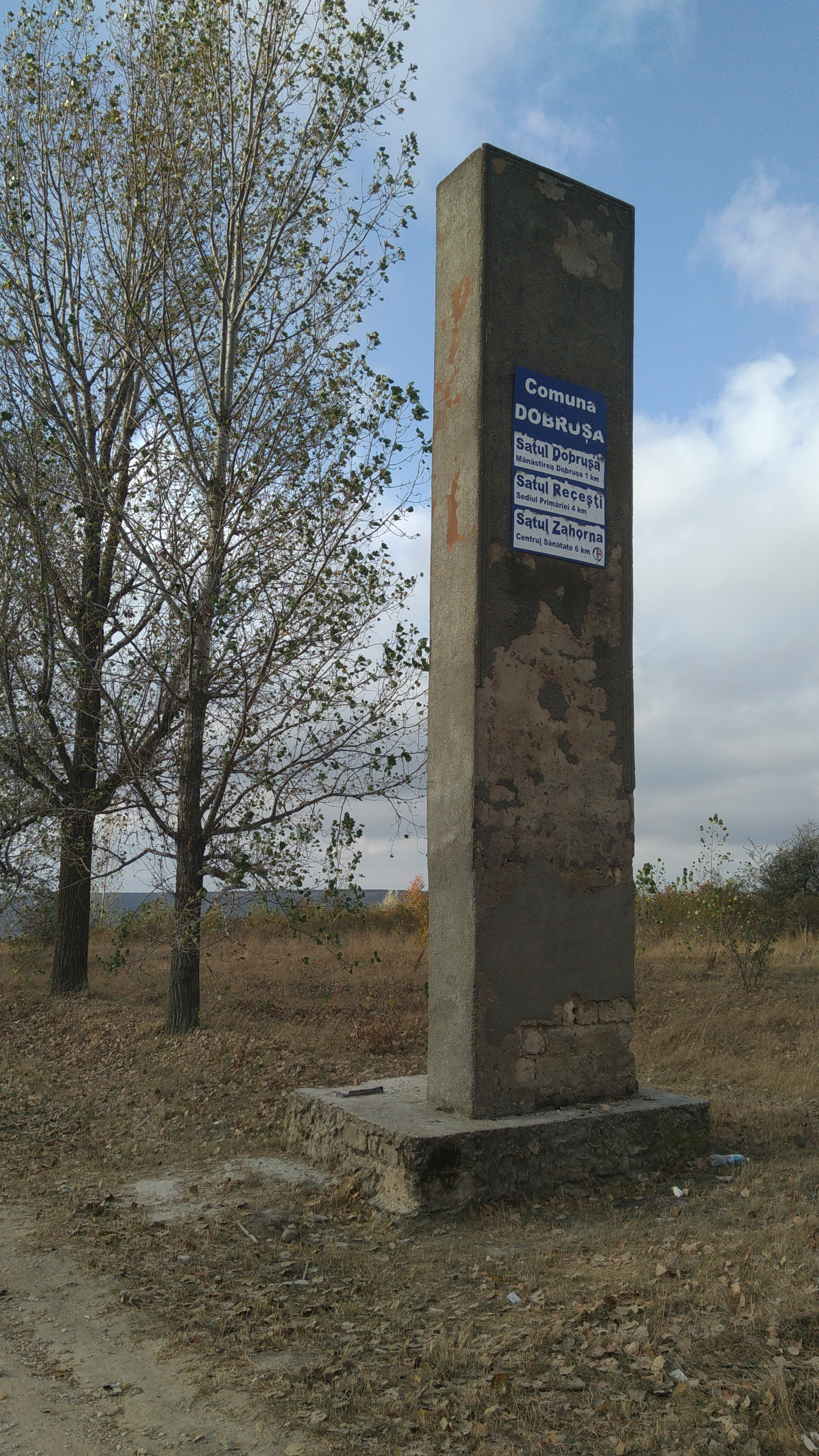
- The entrance to Dobrușa commune from Soldănești

- Location within Moldova
- Coordinates: 47.7853°N 28.5939°E
- Country: Moldova
- District: Șoldănești District

Government
  - Mayor: Victor Grosu

Population (2014)
  - Total: 1,329
- Time zone: UTC+2 (EET)
  - Summer (DST): UTC+3 (EEST)

Dobrușa is a commune in Șoldănești District, Moldova. It is composed of three villages: Dobrușa, Recești and Zahorna.
