= Eduard Aghayan =

Armenian linguist and philologist

Eduard Aghayan (Armenian: Էդուարդ Աղայան; March 16, 1913 – December 29, 1991) was an Armenian linguist and philologist.

== Career ==
Aghayan was born in Meghri and studied at a local primary school before working at a kolkhoz as an accountant. In 1933 he was admitted to Yerevan State University (YSU), which he graduated in 1938 and completed his post-graduate studies in 1939. In 1941 he defended his Candidate of Sciences thesis and his doctoral thesis in 1945. He was named professor in 1946.

He worked at YSU from 1932 until his death. In 1948-50 he was dean of the philology faculty. Between 1956 and 1985 he was head of General Linguistics department, while in 1968-91 he served the head of the Center for Armenian Studies. He also worked at the Institute of Linguistics of the Armenian Academy of Sciences. In 1950-53 he served as its vice-director and from 1963 to 1993 he was head of the department of general and comparative linguistics at the institute. Since 1953 he was a corresponding member of the academy and became a full member (academician) in 1982.

He died in Yerevan.

== Research ==
Aghayan's research focused on general linguistics, the history of Armenian language and linguistics, comparative grammar, and Armenian dialects. He is best known for his Explanatory Dictionary of Modern Armenian (Արդի հայերենի բացատրական բառարան), published in two volumes in 1976. It contains 136,000 words. It is the most comprehensive Eastern Armenian dictionary written in the reformed Armenian orthography.

His Introduction to Linguistics (Լեզվաբանության ներածություն) was originally published in Armenian in 1952 and was approved by Soviet Ministry of Education as a university textbook and was published in Russian (Введение в языкознание) in 1959. Aghayan also authored books on the grammar of Classical Armenian (1964) and dialects (1984). He also edited the works of Hrachia Acharian, his mentor.
