= Vadul-Rașcov =

- Commune
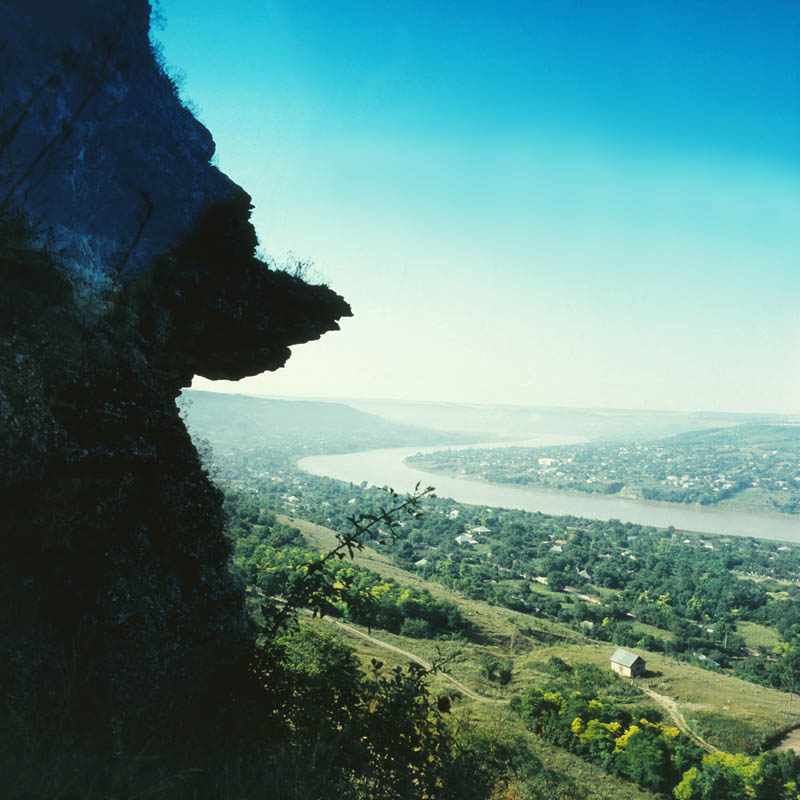

- Location within Moldova
- Coordinates: 47°56′N 28°50′E
- Country: Moldova
- District: Șoldănești District

Government
  - Mayor: Valerii Cerici (PSRM)
- Elevation: 55 m (180 ft)

Population (2014)
  - Total: 1,808
- Time zone: UTC+2 (EET)
  - Summer (DST): UTC+3 (EEST)
- Postal code: MD-7236

Vadul-Rașcov is a commune located in Șoldănești District, Moldova stretched along the right bank of the Dniester River. The commune is composed of two villages, Socola and Vadul-Rașcov. It is approximately 130 km (81 mi) northeast of the capital, Chișinău. As of 2014, the population was 1,808.

== History ==
The history of this location dates to more than 2,500 years ago. The Cave Monastery in Socola already existed in 10th century. The monastery complex, also known as the 7 floor cave monastery, has 7 levels of cells. The complex is expanded to 3 parts on a length of 1.5 kilometres (4,900 ft) along the Dniester River. Due to the very difficult way to get in the monastery and the relatively far distance from Chișinău, the location remains absolutely original, without any signs of current civilization, exactly as it was left about 300 years ago.

The village is also known as the border place for trading routes for many centuries. Before the Dubăsari hydroelectric dam was built, the river was much lower, and it was a perfect place to cross the river by fording. Due to the rocks on the both banks of the river (over 200 m (660 ft) difference), the place was naturally secured from being easy invaded.

In 1930, approximately 2,000 Jews lived in this village. During World War II, the Nazis massacred the local Jewish community.

The vast majority of the population of Vadul-Rașcov works in agriculture. The main tourist attraction is the Dniester River.

== Notable people ==
- Yechiel Shraibman (1913-2005), Yiddish writer
- Iurie Darie (1929 – 2012), Romanian actor
- Dumitru Matcovschi (1939 – 2013), Moldovan writer
- Sergiu Palihovici (born 1971), Moldovan jurist, historian, and politician
