= Mihuleni =

- Village
- Location within Moldova
- Coordinates: 47°50′N 28°50′E
- Country: Moldova
- District: Șoldănești

Government
  - Mayor: Vasilii Parascovei (PDM)

Population (2014 census)
  - Total: 569
- Time zone: UTC+2 (EET)
  - Summer (DST): UTC+3 (EEST)

Mihuleni is a village in Șoldănești District, Moldova.
