= Dumitru Matcovschi =

Moldovan writer

Dumitru Matcovschi OR
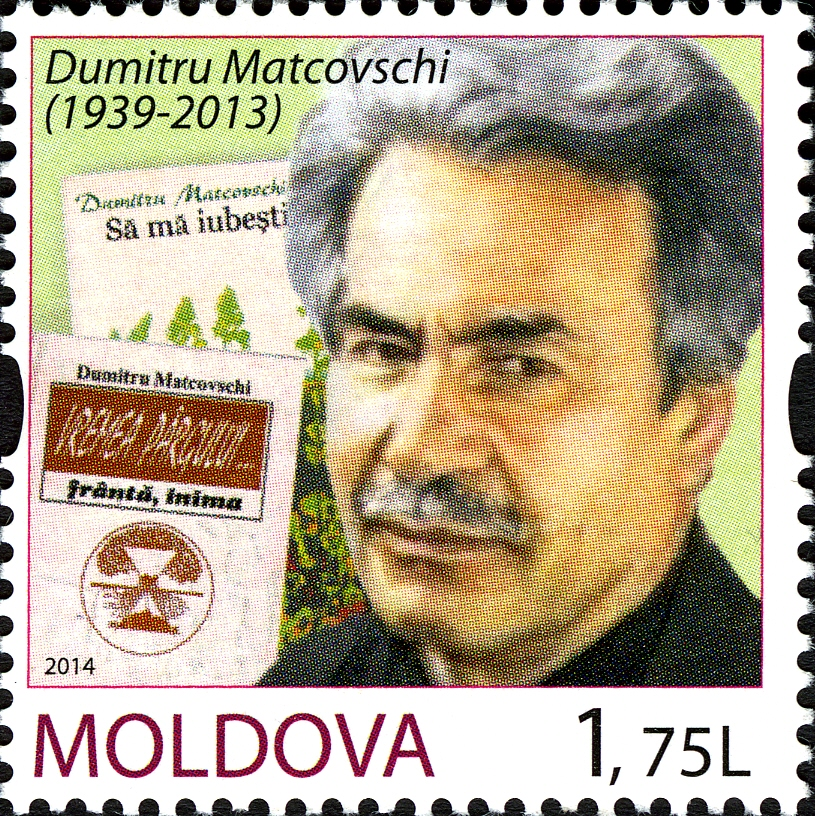
- 2014 stamp of Moldova
- Born: 20 October 1939; Vadul-Raşcov, Kingdom of Romania
- Died: 26 June 2013 (aged 73); Chișinău, Moldova
- Education: Moldova State University
- Employer: Academy of Sciences of Moldova

Dumitru Matcovschi (20 October 1939 – 26 June 2013) was a writer from Moldova who was a member of the Academy of Sciences of Moldova. He was a founder of the Popular Front of Moldova.

== Biography ==
Dumitru Matcovschi was born to Leonte and Eudochia Matcovschi on 20 October 1939 in Vadul-Raşcov, then in Romania. He graduated from the Moldova State University in 1961. Dumitru Matcovschi was a founder of the Democratic Movement of Moldova and Popular Front of Moldova.
Matcovschi died on 26 June 2013 following surgery on 14 June to remove a brain tumor.

== Awards ==
- Honorary citizen Chişinău

== Bibliography ==
- Ana Ghilaş, Dumitru Matcovschi: Parintii. In Limba romana, 1994;
- Enciclopedia Sovietică Moldovenească.
- Literatura şi Arta Moldovei. Enciclopedie. Chişinău. Redacţia Enciclopediei
- Valerian Ciobanu. Nume şi Lume. Chişinău. Editura Pontos. 2008
