= Andrei Lupan =

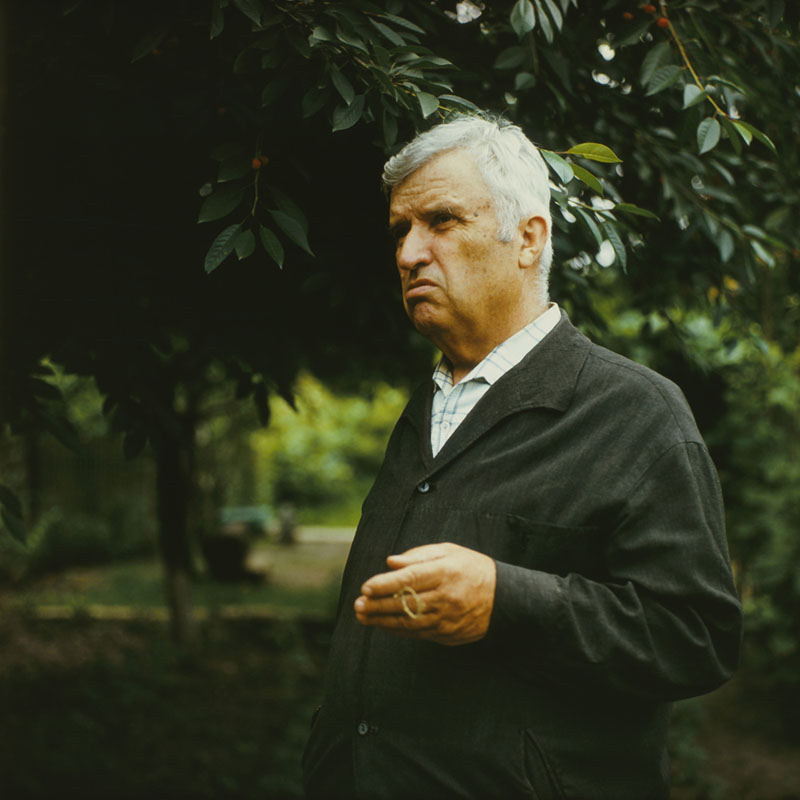
- Lupan in 1983

Chairman of the Supreme Soviet of the Moldavian SSR
- In office 4 March 1963 – 11 April 1967
- Premier: Alexandru Diordiță
- Preceded by: Iosif Vartician
- Succeeded by: Sergiu Rădăuțanu

Personal details
- Born: February 15, 1912 Mihuleni, Orgeyevsky Uyezd, Bessarabia Governorate, Russian Empire
- Died: August 24, 1992 (aged 80) Chișinău, Moldova
- Spouse: Rachel Lupan
- Occupation: Writer, poet

Andrei Lupan (15 February 1912 – 24 August 1992) was a Soviet and Moldovan writer, poet, politician, and chairman of Moldovan Writers' Union (1946–1955; 1958–1961).

== Biography ==
Studied in the agriculture school from Cucuruzeni, Viticulture School from Chişinău and Agriculture Institute from Chişinău. During student time participate to the communist movement in Bessarabia. Chairman of the Writers Union of Moldovan SSR (1946–1962), secretary in the Board of Union of Soviet Writers (1954–1971).

The first appearance is the poem Biography in the journal "Adevărul Literar şi Artistic". Before the war has published only sometimes poetry and essays in revues or papers. The main themes of his poetry are the peasant destiny, the dignity and human honesty, the peaceful and honest work as symbol and purpose of the people. His poetry appear in following books: “Poetry” (1947), “Enter the ballad”(1954), “Master creator”(1958), “Brother of the land” (1959), “The welcome law” (1966), “Gromovnic” (1973), “Selected writings” (1973). A. Lupan writes also essays, articles, getting involved in a large range of events and analysis. He was also a statesman in many republican and USSR organizations.

== Awards ==
A.Lupan got the Moldavian Soviet Socialist Republic State Prize in 1967 and the USSR State Prize in 1975 and many other awards.
