= Șoldănești =

- City
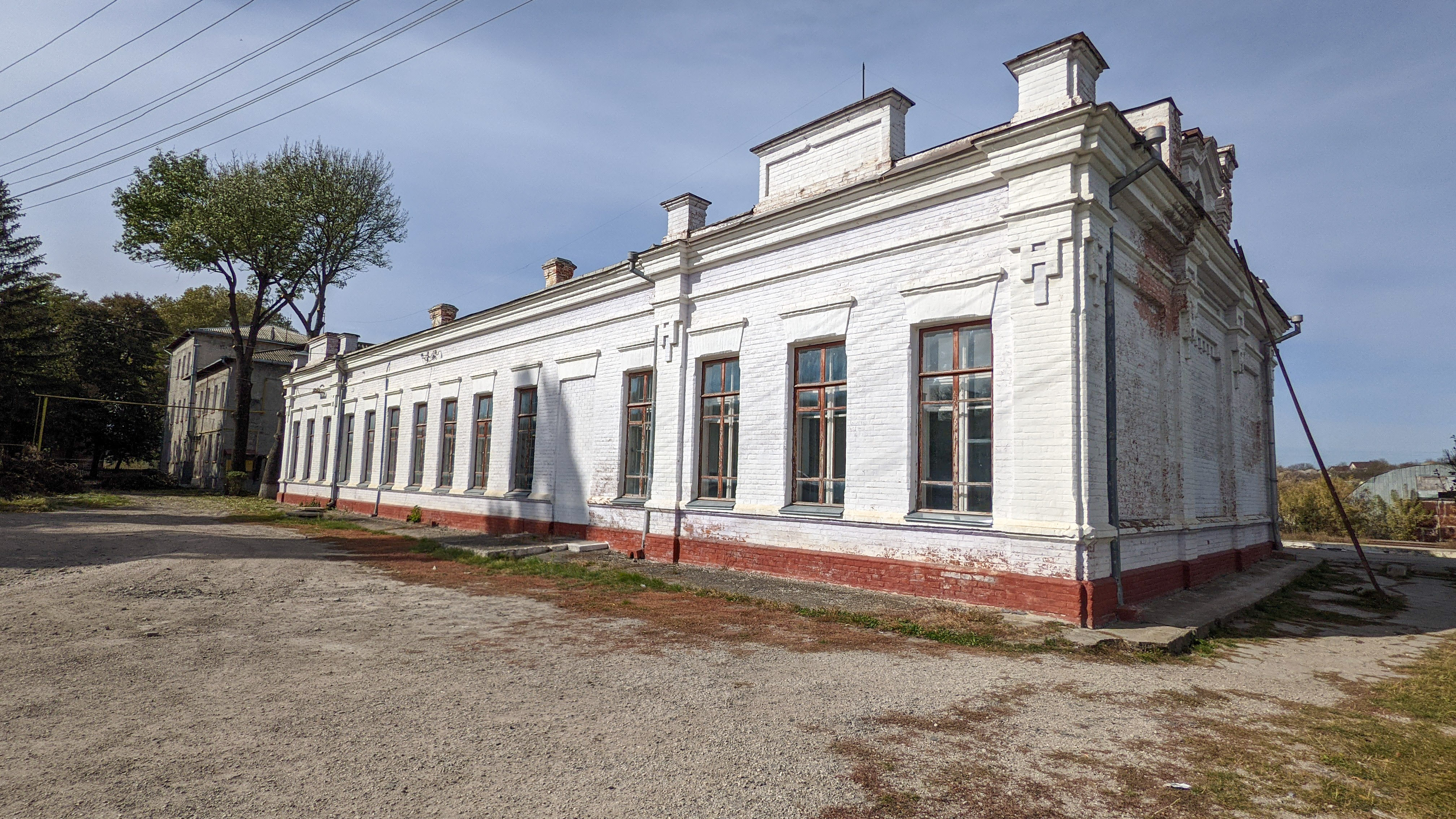
- Railway station

- Location within Moldova
- Coordinates: 47°49′N 28°48′E
- Country: Moldova
- District: Șoldănești District
- Elevation: 145 m (476 ft)

Population (2014)
  - Total: 5,883
- Time zone: UTC+2 (EET)
  - Summer (DST): UTC+3 (EEST)
- Website: www.primaria-soldanesti.md

Șoldănești (Romanian pronunciation: [ʃoldəˈneʃtʲ]) is a city in Moldova. It is the capital of Șoldănești District. Known as Chernenko during the communist era, the town regained its historical name in the early 1980s.

== Demographics ==
According to the 2014 census, the population of Șoldănești amounted to 5,883 inhabitants, a decrease compared to the previous census in 2004, when 6,304 inhabitants were registered. Of these, 2,799 were men and 3,084 were women.

Ethnic composition of Șoldănești (2014)
1. Moldovans* (90.3%)
2. Romanians (4.30%)
3. Ukrainians (2.45%)
4. Russians (2.26%)
5. Others (0.66%)
:Linguistic composition of Șoldănești (2014)
1. Moldovan* (82.0%)
2. Romanian (12.8%)
3. Russian (3.76%)
4. Ukrainian (1.07%)
5. Other (0.24%)

Footnotes:

* There is an ongoing controversy regarding the ethnic identification of Moldovans and Romanians.

* Moldovan language is one of the two local names for the Romanian language in Moldova. In 2013, the Constitutional Court of Moldova interpreted that Article 13 of the constitution is superseded by the Declaration of Independence, thus giving official status to the name Romanian.

Historical population
Year	Pop.	±%
1989	7,578	—
2004	6,304	−16.8%
2014	5,883	−6.7%

== Media ==
- Jurnal FM - 99.1 MHz,
