= Elizabeth Redgate =

Anne Elizabeth Redgate or A. E. Redgate was born in Lancashire and educated at Bolton School Girls Division and St. Anne's College, Oxford. Since completing her education, she has taught Early Medieval History as a lecturer at the Newcastle University.

Her 2000 book The Armenians covers the history of the Armenian people. It was well-received by reviewers. Hovann Simonian called it a "truly impressive" achievement that is "likely to become a valuable reference tool." Robert W. Thomson wrote that it provides a "useful background for all those interested in the ancient and medieval worlds", calling it a "valuable book which fills a serious gap." He called it a "synthesis rather than original interpretation of the sources" and noted that "untranslated texts are rarely quoted." Thomson described it as the first "reliable general introduction to Armenian history in a single volume" since René Grousset's Histoire de l'Arménie des origines à 1071 (1947).

Yannopoulos said it is an "interesting work, but only for the historical facts concerning the period before the 11th century." Raymond Pearson praised the "many virtues" of the work, noting that the "authoritative scholarly narrative and expert analysis on display is never less than impeccably professional." He suggested that the author should have restricted herself to coverage of the first two millennia. Dennis Papazian called it an "excellent book", describing it as "learned, objective, well argued, and eminently readable." He, too, noted that the post-11th century history is not well-covered.

== Works ==
- Redgate, Anne Elizabeth (1999), The Armenians (1st ed.), Oxford, UK: Blackwell Publishers, ISBN 0-631-22037-2
- Redgate, Anne Elizabeth. (2003), Armeni (Czech Translation of The Armenians). Prague: Nakladatelstvi Lidove Noviny, ISBN.
- Redgate, Anne Elizabeth. (2004), "Catholico John III's Against the Paulicians and the Paulicians of Tephrike." In Armenian Sebastia/Sivas and Lesser Armenia, edited by Richard G. Hovannisian, 81-110. Los Angeles, California: Mazada Publishers, 2004. ISBN 978-1-56859-152-0.
- Redgate, Anne Elizabeth. (2006), The Armenians, Greek translation. Athens: Odisseas, ISBN 978-960-210-506-1.
- Redgate, Anne Elizabeth. (2006), "National Letters, Vernacular Christianity and National Identity in Early Medieval Armenia." In: International Conference dedicated to the 1600th Anniversary of the Armenian Letters Creation, 168-176. Yerevan, Armenia: National Academy of Sciences of Armenia.
- Redgate, Anne Elizabeth. "An Armenian Physician at the Early Tenth-Century Court of Louis III of Provence? The Case of the Autun Glossary." Al-Masaq 19:2 (2007): 83-98.
- Redgate, Anne Elizabeth. (2007), "Morale, Cohesion, and Power in the First Centuries of Amatuni Hamshen." in The Hemshin: History, Society and Identity in the Highlands of North East Turkey, edited by H. H. Simonian, 3-18. London: Routledge, ISBN 978-0-7007-0656-3.
- Redgate, Anne Elizabeth. "Myth and Reality: Armenian Identity in the Early Middle Ages." National Identities 9:4 (2007): 281-306.
- Redgate, Anne Elizabeth. "Vernacular Liturgy in England and Armenia from the Fifth to the Eleventh Centuries." Armenian Folia Anglistika: International Journal of English Studies 2:5 (2008): 144-161.
- Redgate, Anne Elizabeth. (2009), "The Foundations of Hamshen and Armenian Descent Myths: Parallels and Interconnections." In Armenian Pontus: The Trebizond-Black Sea Communities, edited by Richard G. Hovannisian, 113-136. Costa Mesa, California: Mazba Publishers, ISBN 978-1-56859-155-1.
- Redgate, Anne Elizabeth. "Faces from the Past: Aghtamar, the Anglo-Saxon Alfred Jewel, and the Sasanian Chosroes Dish - Ideas and Influences in Portraiture." Banber Matenadarani 21 (2014): 331-340.
- Redgate, Anne Elizabeth, (2014), Religion, Politics and Society in Britain, 800-1066, London, UK: Routledge, ISBN 978-0-415-73668-8.
- Redgate, Anne Elizabeth. Review of Æthelred: The Unready by Levi Roach (New Haven, Conn: Yale University Press, 2016). The American Historical Review 123:3 (2018), 1003-1004.
- Redgate, Anne Elizabeth. (2021), "Armenian Iran in the history of Vaspurakan in the late ninth and early tenth centuries." In Armenian Communities of Persia/Iran: History, Trade, Culture, edited by Richard G. Hovannisian, 59-76. Costa Mesa, California: Mazda Publishers, ISBN 978-1-56859-358-6.
- Redgate, Anne Elizabeth. (2022), Royal Building Programs in Tenth and Eleventh Century Armenia: The Island City of Aghtamar. Lewiston, New York: The Edwin Mellen Press, ISBN 9781495510274.
