= Rezina =

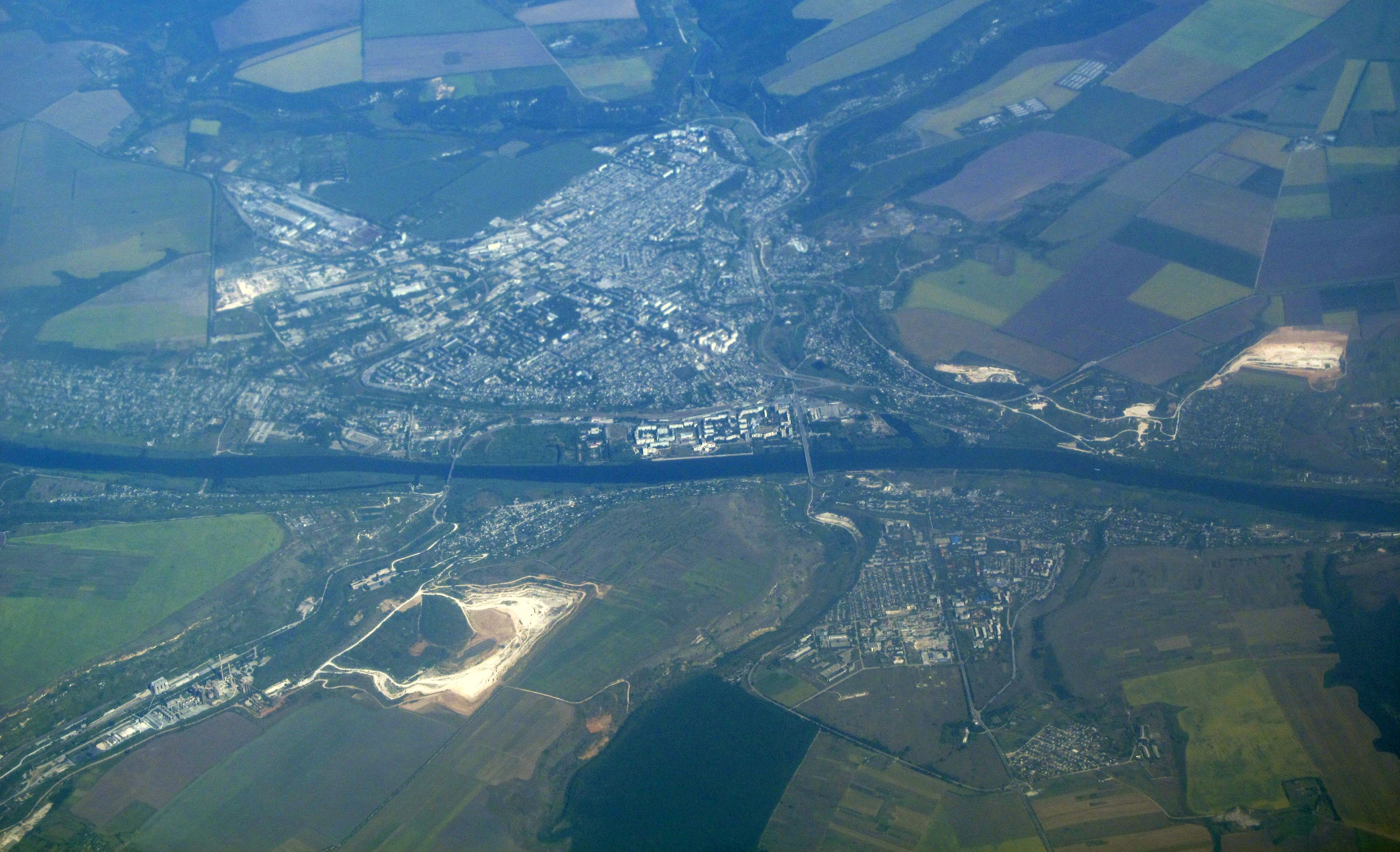
- Aerial view of Rîbnița (top), Rezina (right), and Ciorna (left)

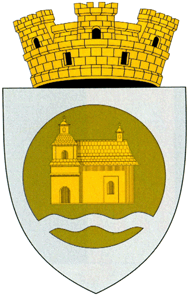
- Flag Coat of arms

- Location in Moldova
- Coordinates: 47°44′N 28°57′E
- Country: Moldova
- District: Rezina District

Population (2014)
  - Total: 11,032
- Time zone: UTC+2 (EET)
  - Summer (DST): UTC+3 (EEST)
- Postal code: MD-5400
- Area code: +373 254
- Website: orasul-rezina.com

Rezina is a city in Moldova and the capital of Rezina District. Three villages are administered by the city: Boşerniţa, Ciorna and Stohnaia.

== Geography ==
In the northeastern part of Moldova, as far as 98 km from Chișinău, the town of Rezina is situated on three successive terraces formed by the picturesque right bank of the Dniester. The lowest terrace (along the Dniester) houses the older town, the second one (on the hill slope) contains buildings constructed in the 1950-60s, while the upper terrace is the seat of the new town constructed in the 1970-90s. The town is 3 km from the Rîbnița railway station and 6 km from that of Mateuţi. The republican highway Orhei – Rîbnița is going through the town.

== History ==
Archaeological monuments show that the area was first settled 10’000 to 40’000 years ago. During the Indo-European period (5000–3000 BCE) the Thracians (Geto-Dacians in particular) settled there. In 1946 archeologists discovered an ancient site founded by the Geto-Dacians in the 4. or 3. century BCE, in Rezina's western outskirts. It was built on a small promontory at the merger of two depressions and was 50 m long and 100 m wide. The site was heavily damaged by construction works on a cattle-breeding farm and a repair station for agricultural machines. The area requires further excavations in order to pinpoint the exact date of Geto-Dacian settlement and the cause of its decline.

The founding of the Roman province of Dacia had a significant impact on the local population, even though Rezina was not included in the Roman province and was inhabited by free Dacians. However, the close proximity of Roman rule influenced the local population who were Romanized by learning many traits of Roman culture and tradition, the Latin language and script, and the conversion to Christianity. After the Romans left in 271 CE up until the 14th century, many people passed through the land around Rezina and the town grew. Small rural settlements numbered about 10–15 or more dwellings, usually inhabited by 45–50 persons tied by family relations. The favourable natural conditions of the area created all the prerequisites of rural farm life. Fertile soils were conducive to the development of agriculture and cattlebreeding and the Dniester and dense forests also played a major role in the development of Rezina in the late 14th and 15th century.

Among Sfatul Țării members there were some Rezina locals: Vasile Bârcă and Pavel Cocârlă from Ignăţei, Elefterie Sinicliu from Echimăuţi, Nicolae Checerul Cuş from Stohnaia. In 1920, there were 749 houses and 4,320 inhabitants in Rezina. Economic units and public facilities included: 1 landowners estate, 1 agricultural cooperation, 3 quarries, a beer brewery, a tannery, 3 water- and 1 steam-mills, a primary school, a lyceum, a vocational school, some Jewish synagogues, 10 taverns, a cinema, 2 banks, a drug-store and a hospital with 3 doctors.

== Monument ==
- In 2017, a bust of the King of Romania Ferdinand I, made by sculptor Veaceslav Jiglitski, was unveiled.
- In 2018, the Monument to the Heroes of the Nation was restored. The eagle for it was created by sculptor Veaceslav Jiglitski.
- In 2020, a bust of Constantin Stere, also made by Veaceslav Jiglitski, was unveiled.

== Media ==
- Cuvântul
- Vocea Basarabiei 101.9

== Notable people ==
- Nicolae Checerul Cus
- Joseph Rabinowitz
