= Hligeni Nature Reserve =

- IUCN category IV (habitat/species management area)
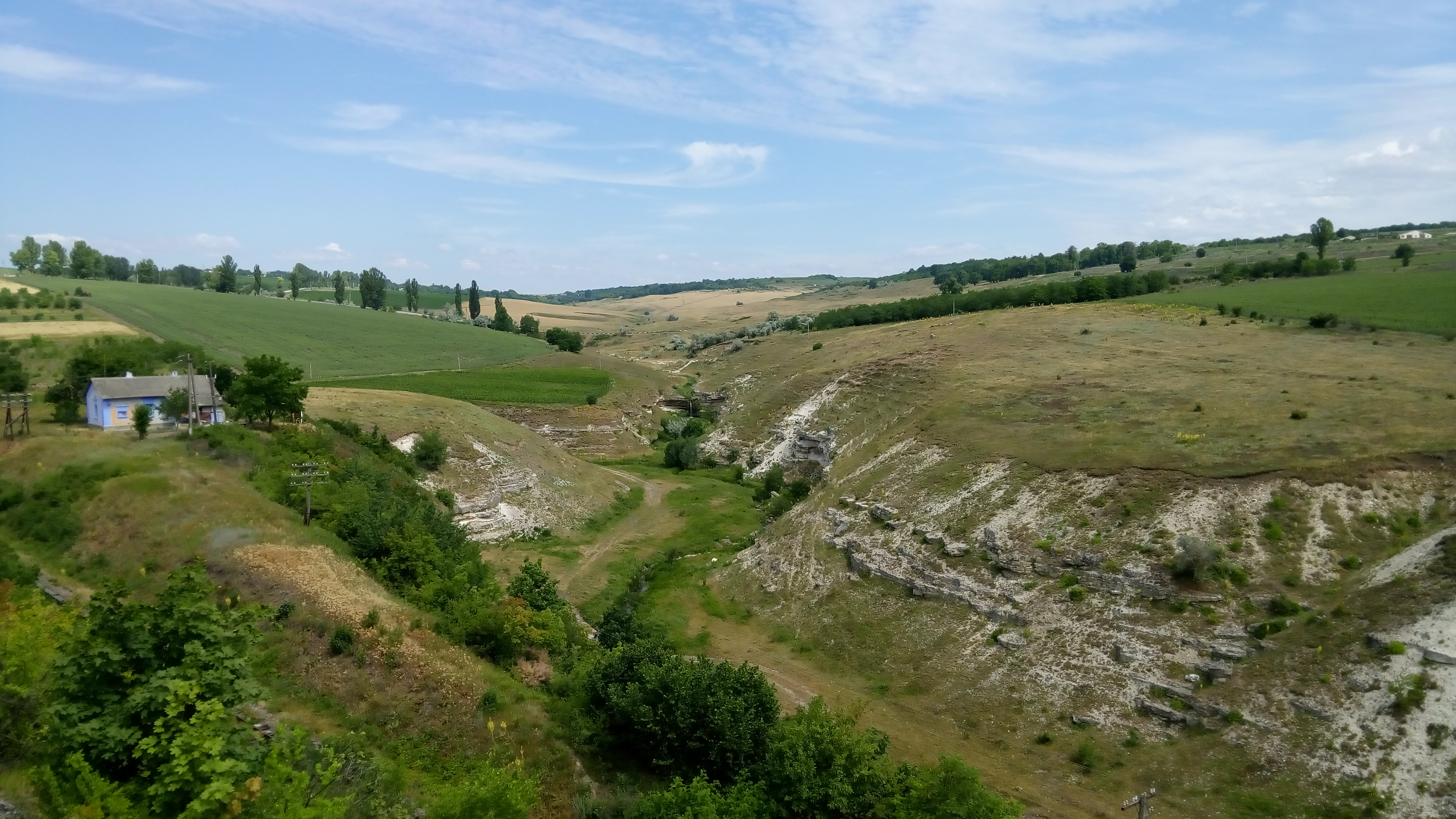
- Interactive map of Hligeni Nature Reserve
- Location: Șoldănești District, Republic of Moldova
- Area: 70 ha

Hligeni is an IUCN Category IV nature reserve protected for its forest species, located in the Șoldănești District of the Republic of Moldova. It sits northwest of Mateuți village within plot 31 of the Șoldănești forest district. The reserve spans an area of 70 hectares and is managed by the Soroca State Forestry Enterprise.
