= Saharna Monastery =

Coordinates: 47°41′42″N 28°57′56″E

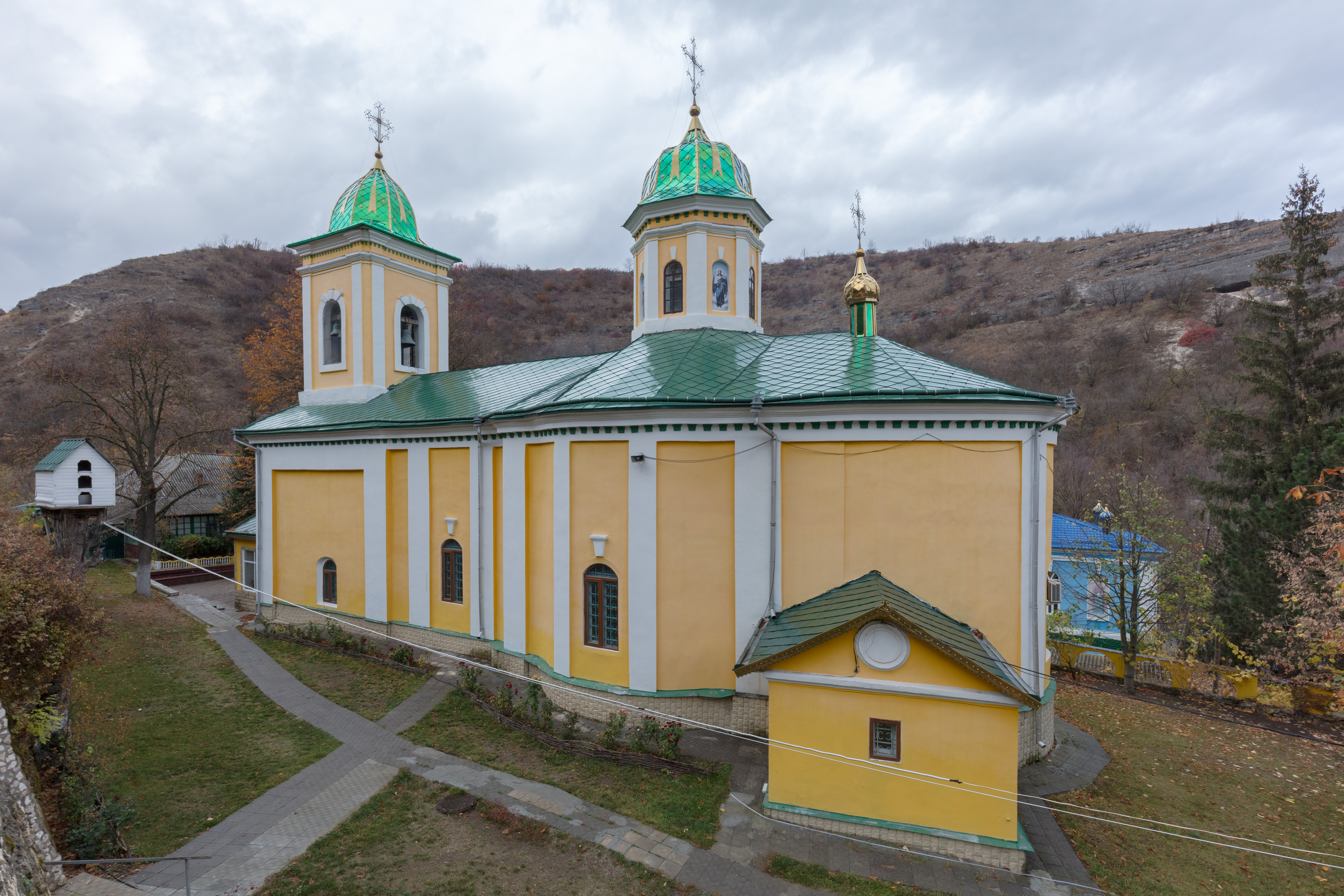
- Saharna Monastery
- Location: Saharna, Rezina District
- Country: Moldova
- Denomination: Eastern Orthodoxy

History
- Status: Monastery

Architecture
- Completed: 1776

The Saharna Monastery (Romanian: Mănăstirea Saharna) is a monastery in Saharna, Moldova.

The "Holy Trinity" Monastery of Saharna, situated about 110 km north of Chișinău, on the west side of the Nistru River, is considered to be one of the biggest centres for religious pilgrimages in Moldova. Here can be found the unique relics of the Blessed Macarie, and on the top of the high cliff, according to a legend, there is a footprint of St. Maria, the Mother of Jesus. The legend says that a monk from the monastery once saw the shining figure of Saint Maria on the top of a rock. When reaching that spot the monk saw a mark of a footstep on the ground.

== Gallery ==
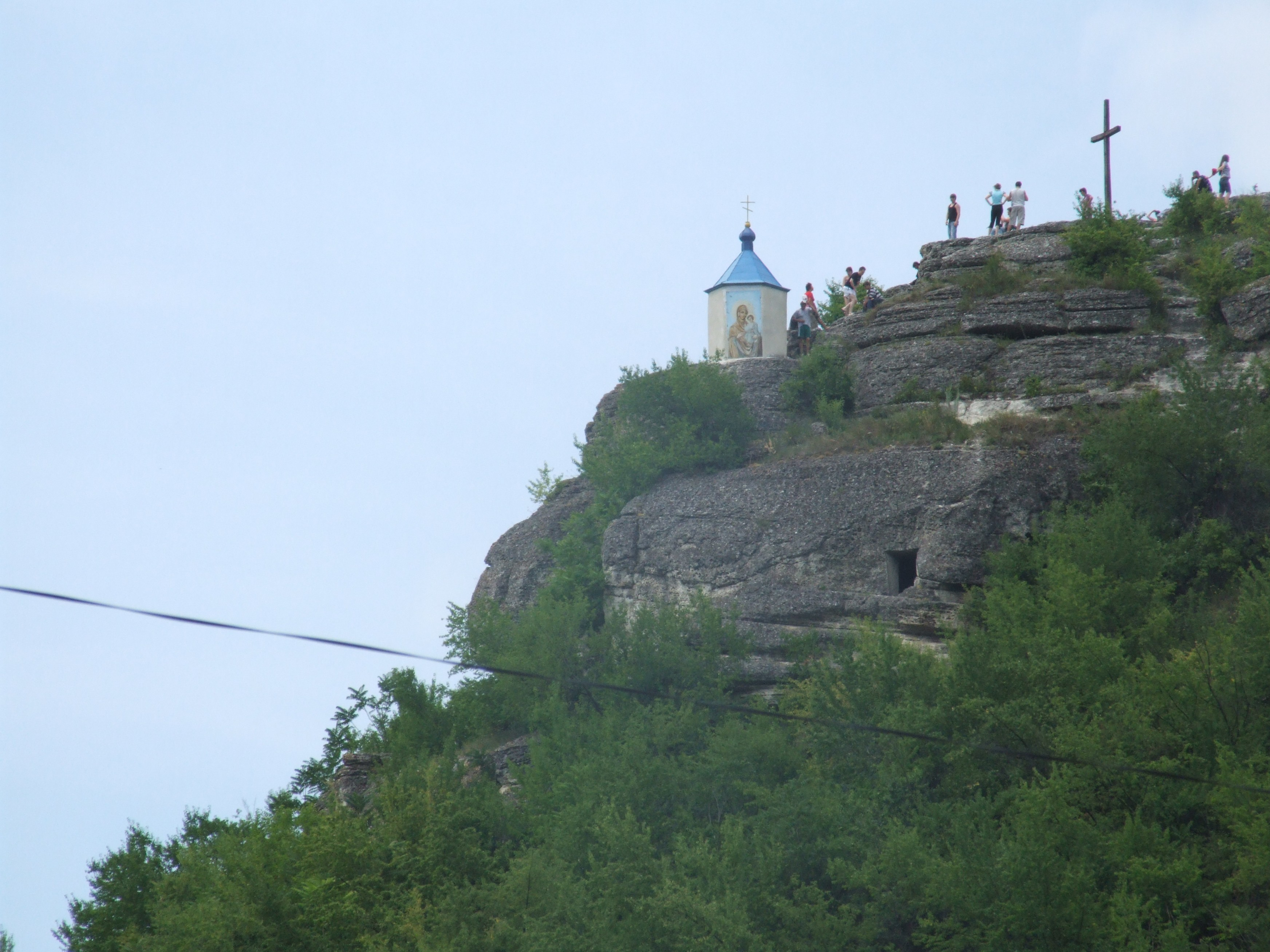

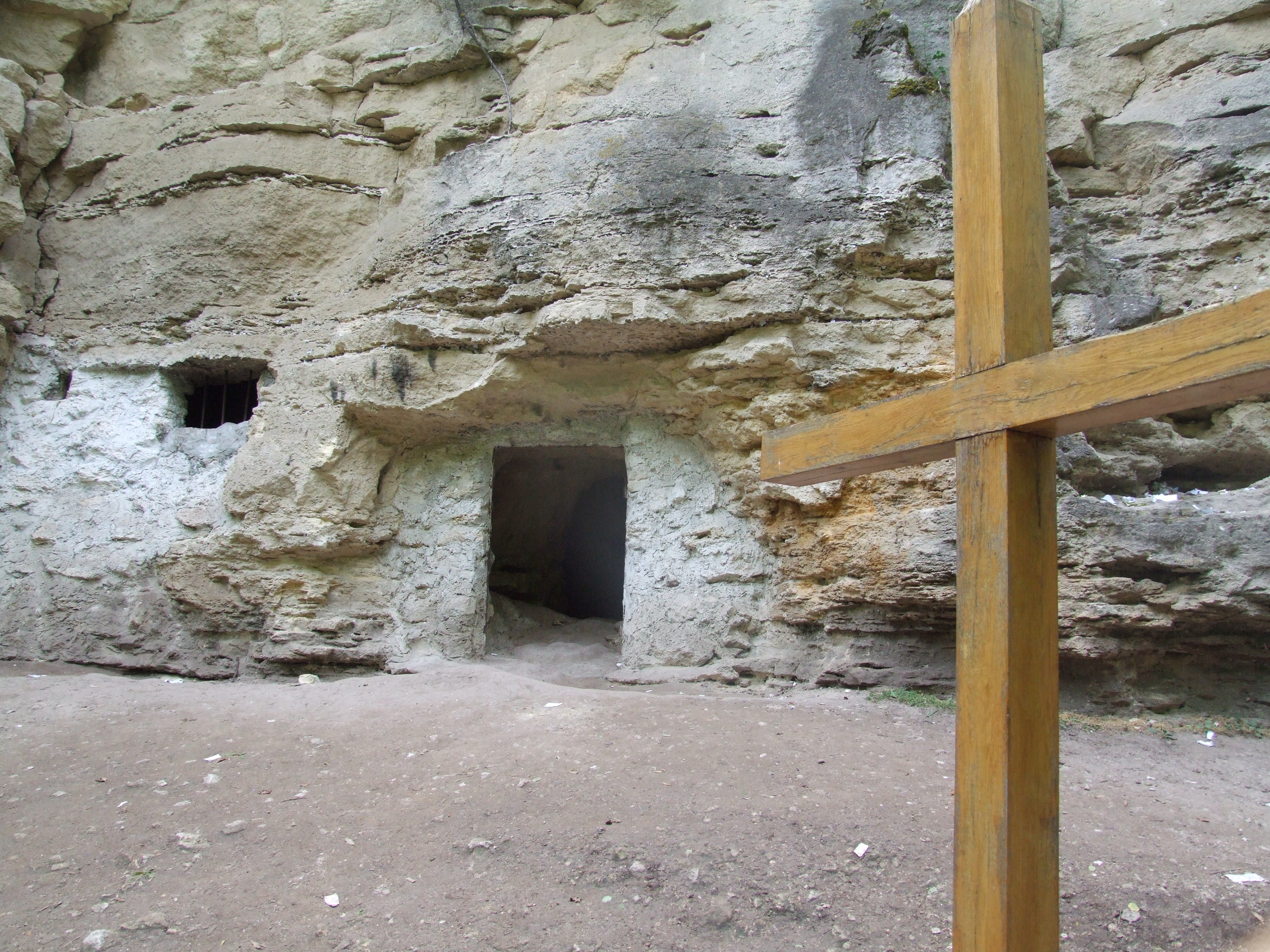

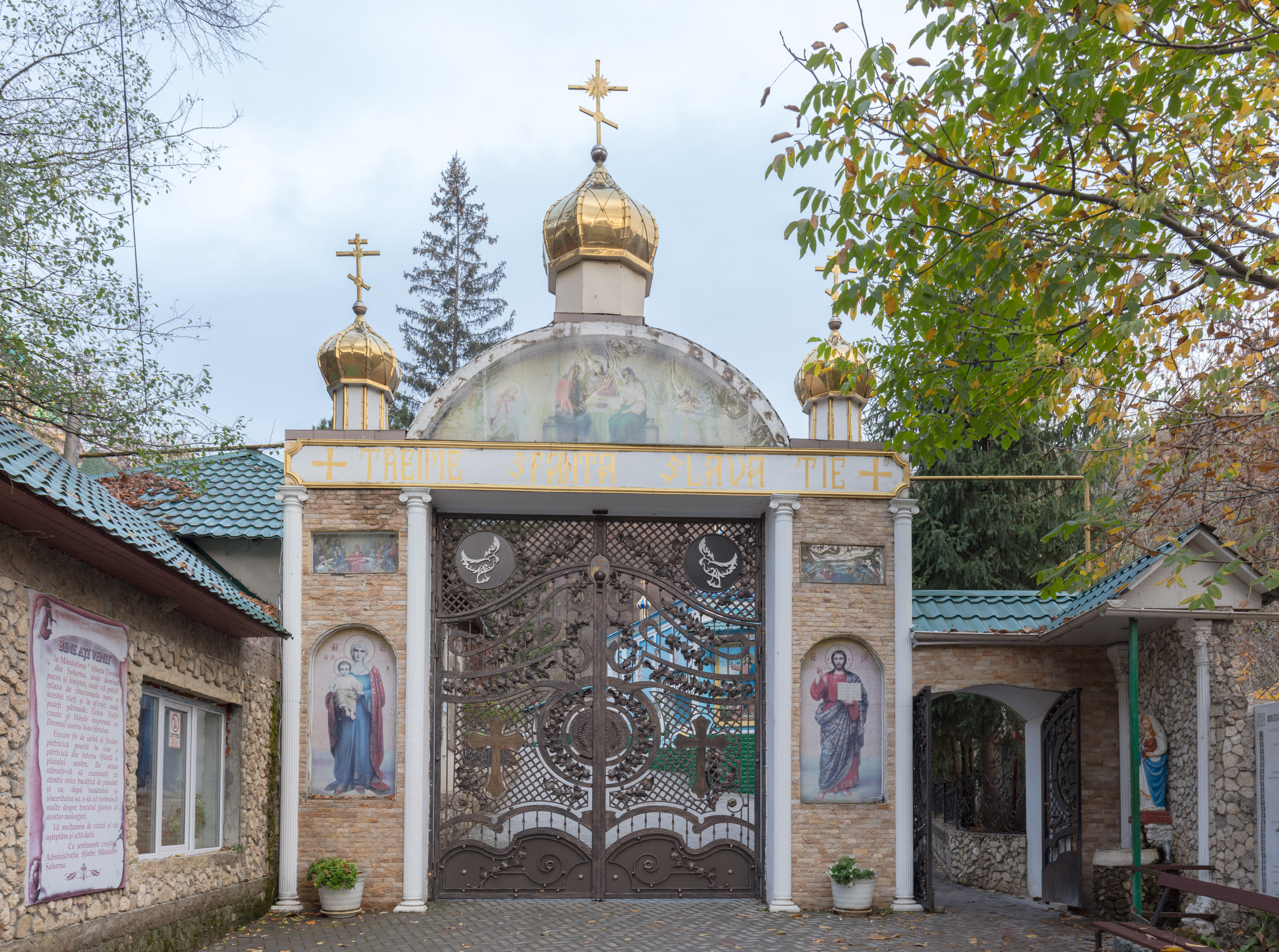

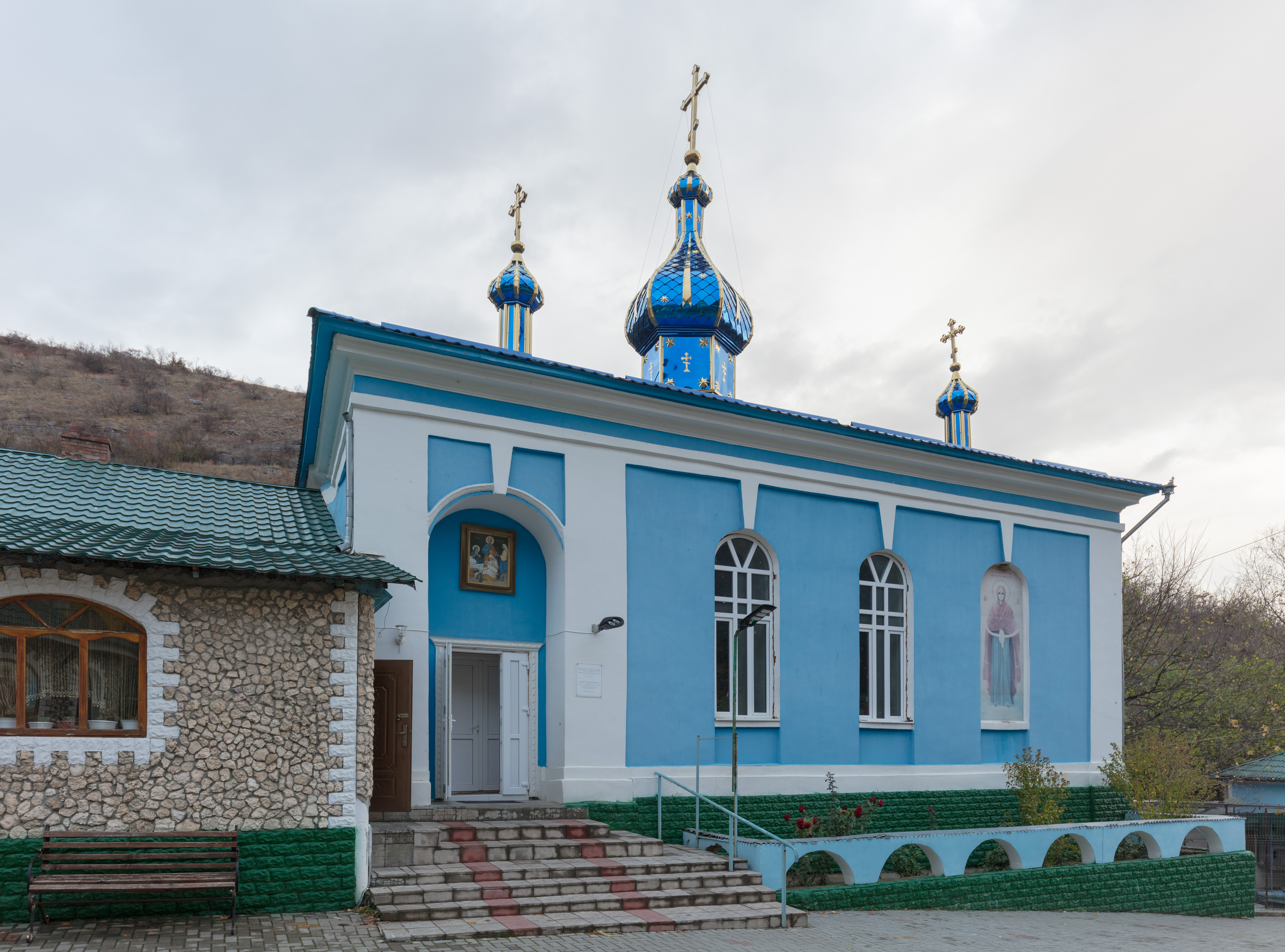

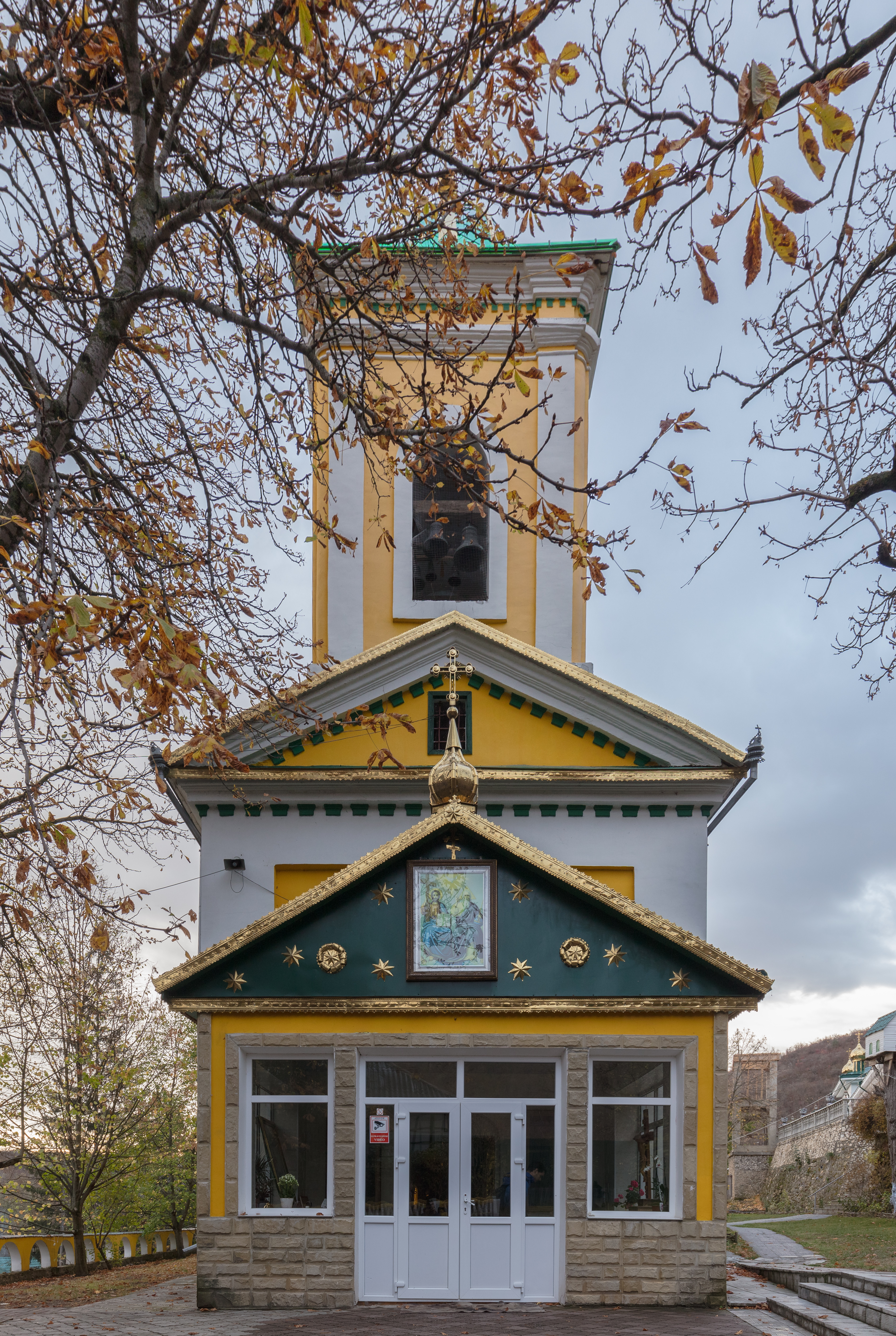

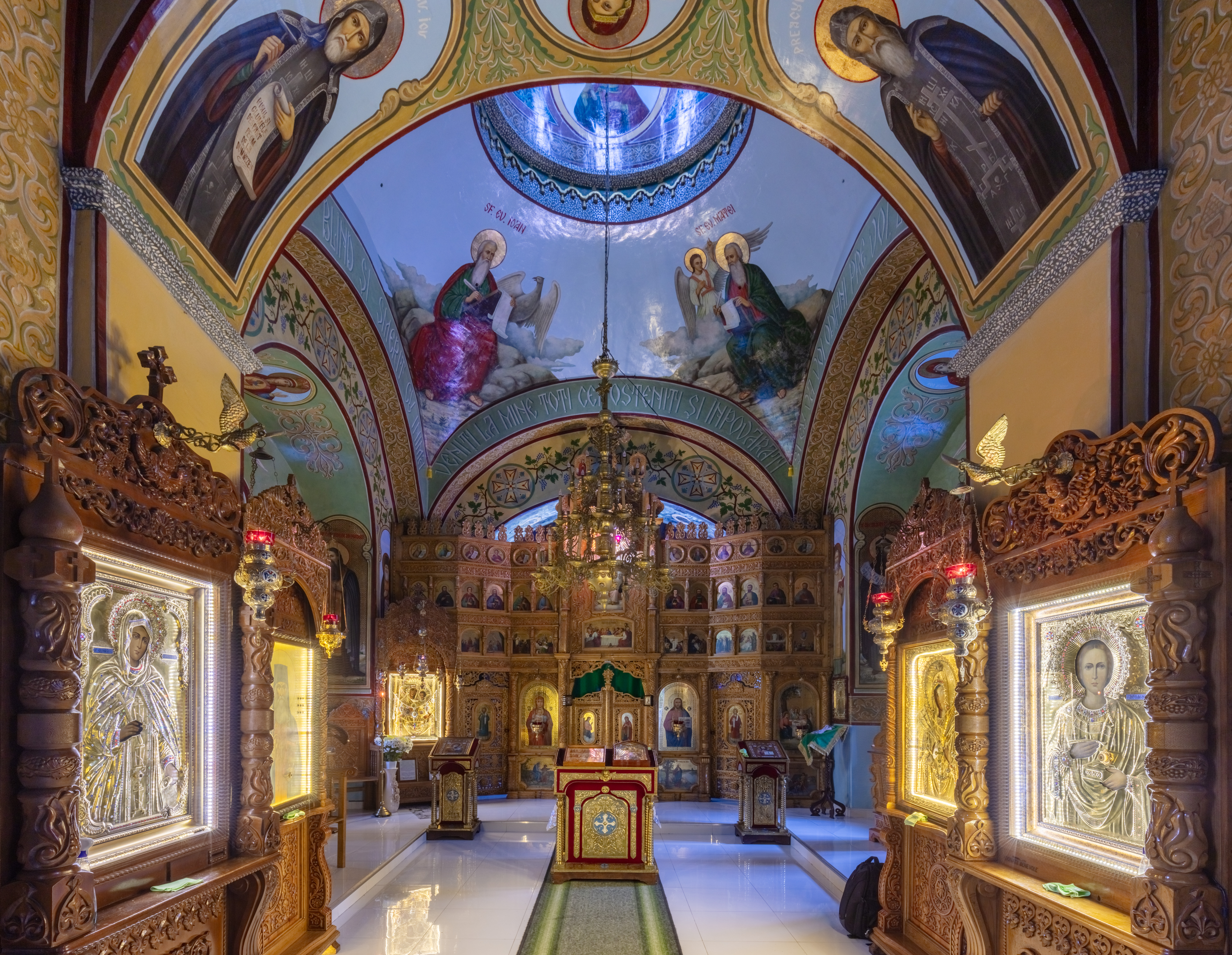
