= Simon-Apel =

Simon's Family משפחת סימון
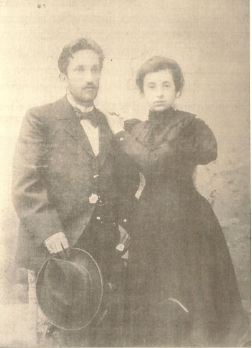
- Shlomo and Rachel Simon
- Founder: National Commercial Bank
- Members: Shlomo, Tzila, Rachel, Samuel, Ala

Simon-Apel (Hebrew: סימון-אפל) is a wealthy Israeli family, owners of the National Commercial Bank and one of the first families and investors in Tel Aviv.

== Background ==
Shlomo and his wife Rachel moved to Tel Aviv in 1909-1910. His son Eliezer was an engineer in Russia's train station. In 1908 Eliezer became sick and moved to Berlin for medical assistance. In 1912 he died leaving behind his wife Tzila Simon Apel and four children. Tzila decided to move to Israel in 1914 and lived in Reines Street. Due to the family's wealth, they were one of the first to build houses in Tel Aviv without taking a mortgage from the Jewish National Fund.

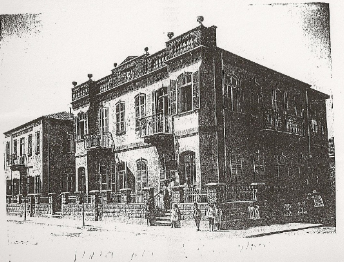
Simon's Houses Tel Aviv 1913

Shlomo and Rachel built two houses at Herzl 20 St.

The purchase certificate was signed by the first mayor of Tel Aviv Meir Dizengoff.

Hannah Lichtenstein's daughter was Ala Simon, who married Samuel. She served in the Auxiliary Territorial Service in Alexandria, Egypt. Soon after Israel's declaration of statehood, she joined the Israel Defense Forces as an officer. She was a polyglot, speaking Hebrew, France, German, Russian and English.

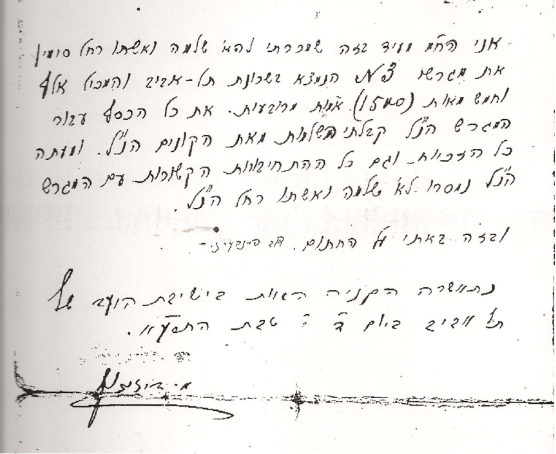
Agreement for buying the land #3 of Tel Aviv signed by the first mayor Meir Dizengoff

Most of the family's early wealth came from international trade.

== Investments in Tel Aviv ==
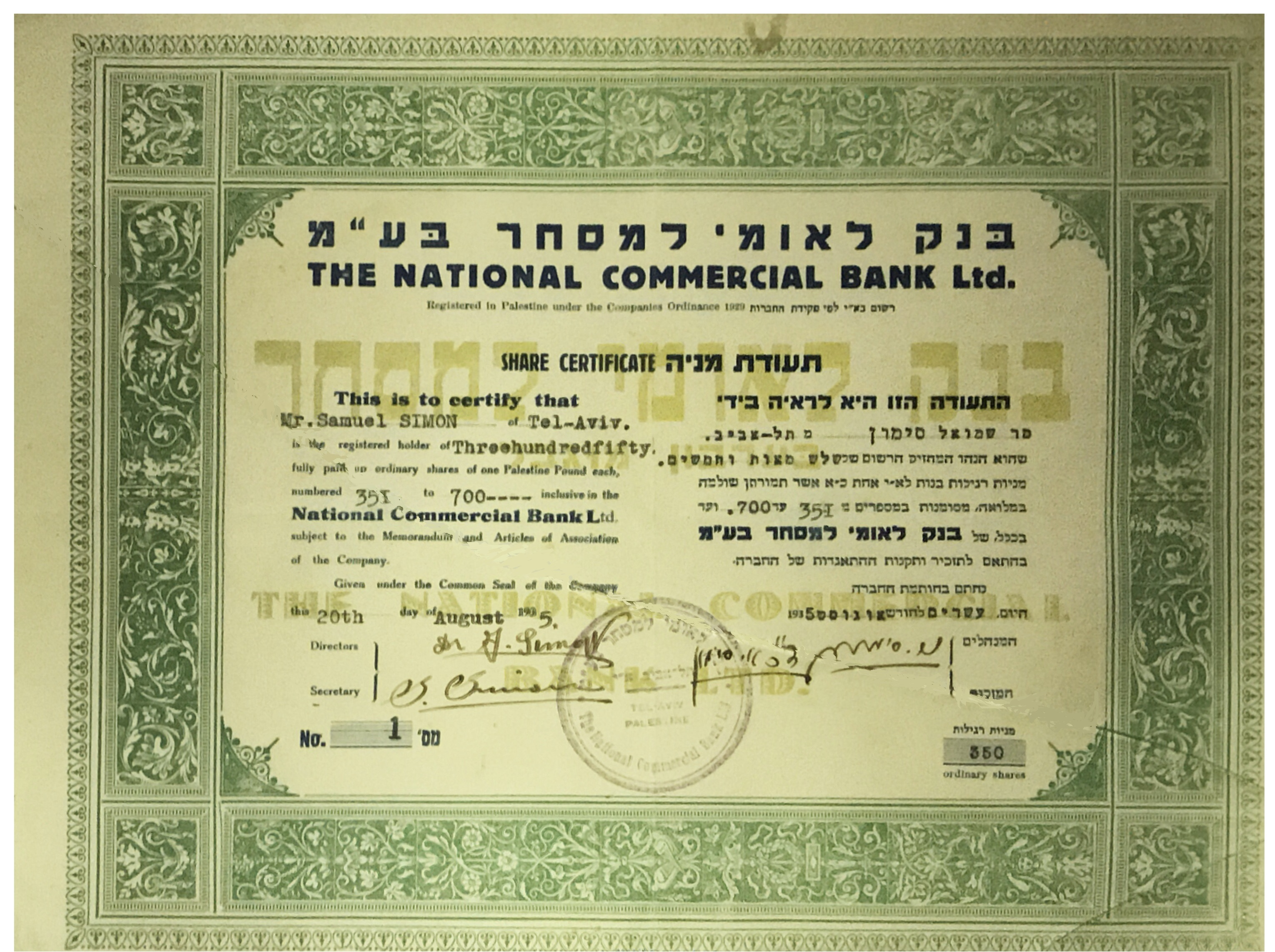
Samuel Simon's holdings of the National Commercial Bank Ltd.

After Samuel Simon completed his Economics degree in France, he returned to Israel to support the community of Tel Aviv. He was known as one of the best customers of the Anglo-Palestine Bank (Today known as Bank Leumi). Shortly thereafter he decided, together with his brother Aharon Simon, to fund the National Commercial Bank, with the purpose of helping immigrants build houses and live in Tel Aviv.

== Notables ==
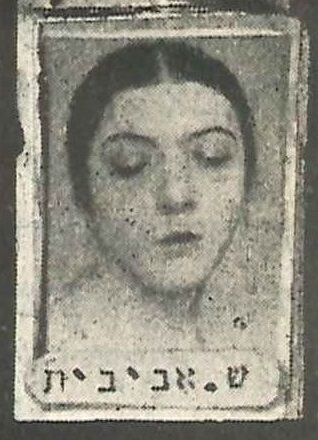
Shoshana Avivit

Ala Simon's aunt Shoshana Avivit was an actress. She played in The Dybbuk and one of the 12 founders of Habima Theatre. She married Daniel Lecourtois
