= Saharna Nouă =

- Commune
- Location in Moldova
- Coordinates: 47°41′N 28°57′E
- Country: Moldova
- District: Rezina District

Population (2014)
  - Total: 1,325
- Time zone: UTC+2 (EET)
  - Summer (DST): UTC+3 (EEST)

Saharna Nouă is a commune in Rezina District, Moldova. It is composed of three villages: Buciușca, Saharna and Saharna Nouă, located on the right side of the Dniester River.

Saharna Monastery is situated at the distance of 110 km from Chișinău city. The monastic complex is a natural reservation and carved into the cliff side.

== Gallery ==
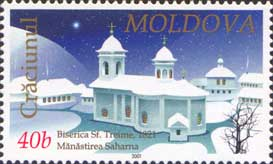
Saharna Monastery
