= David Bloch-Blumenfeld =

- דוד בלוך-בלומנפלד

2nd Mayor of Tel Aviv
- In office 1925–1927
- Preceded by: Meir Dizengoff
- Succeeded by: Meir Dizengoff

Personal details
- Born: 1880 Motal, Russian Empire (present-day Belarus)
- Died: 27 November 1947 (aged 66–67) Tel Aviv, Mandatory Palestine (present-day Israel)
- Party: Poale Zion; Labor Zionism

David Bloch-Blumenfeld (Hebrew: דוד בלוך-בלומנפלד; 1887 – 1947), sometimes simply David Bloch, was one of the leaders of the Labor Zionism movement in Mandate Palestine and mayor of Tel Aviv in 1925–27. Moshav Dovev in northern Israel is named after him.
