= Lalova =

- Commune
- Location in Moldova
- Coordinates: 47°34′N 29°01′E
- Country: Moldova
- District: Rezina District

Population (2014)
  - Total: 1,482
- Time zone: UTC+2 (EET)
  - Summer (DST): UTC+3 (EEST)

Lalova is a commune in Rezina District, Moldova. It is composed of three villages: Lalova, Nistreni and Țipova.

== Gallery ==
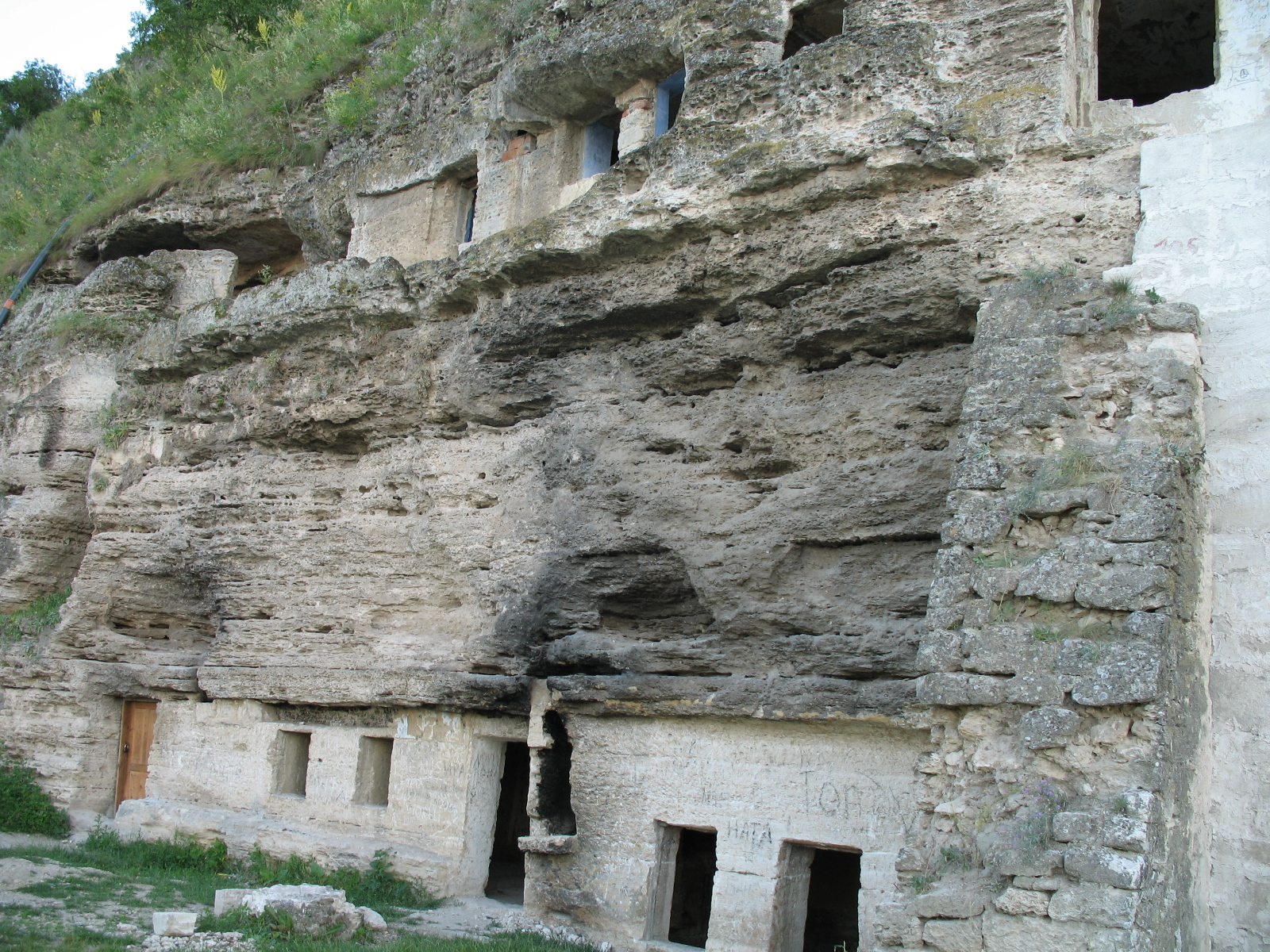
Rocky monastery near Țipova

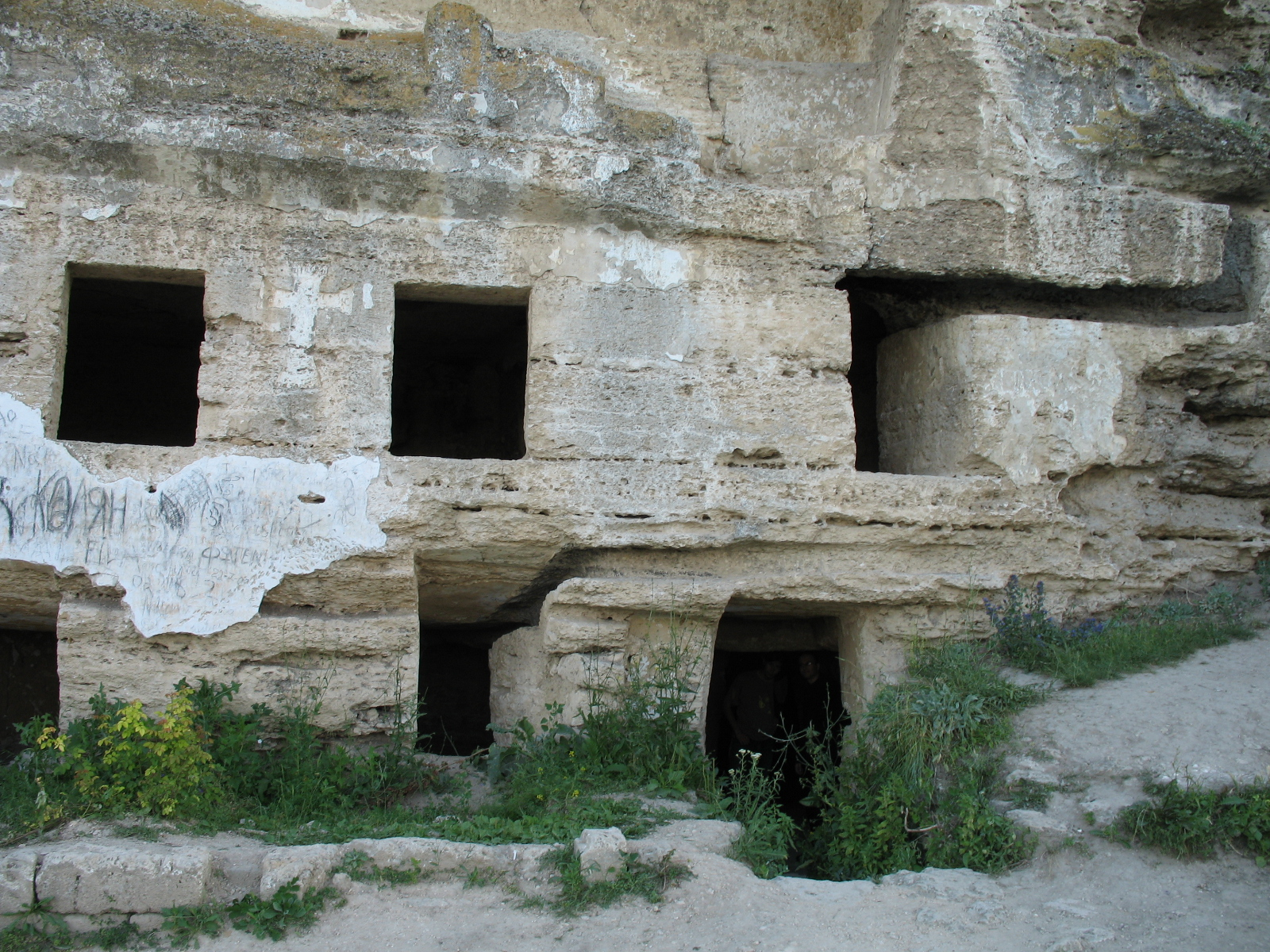
Rocky monastery near Țipova

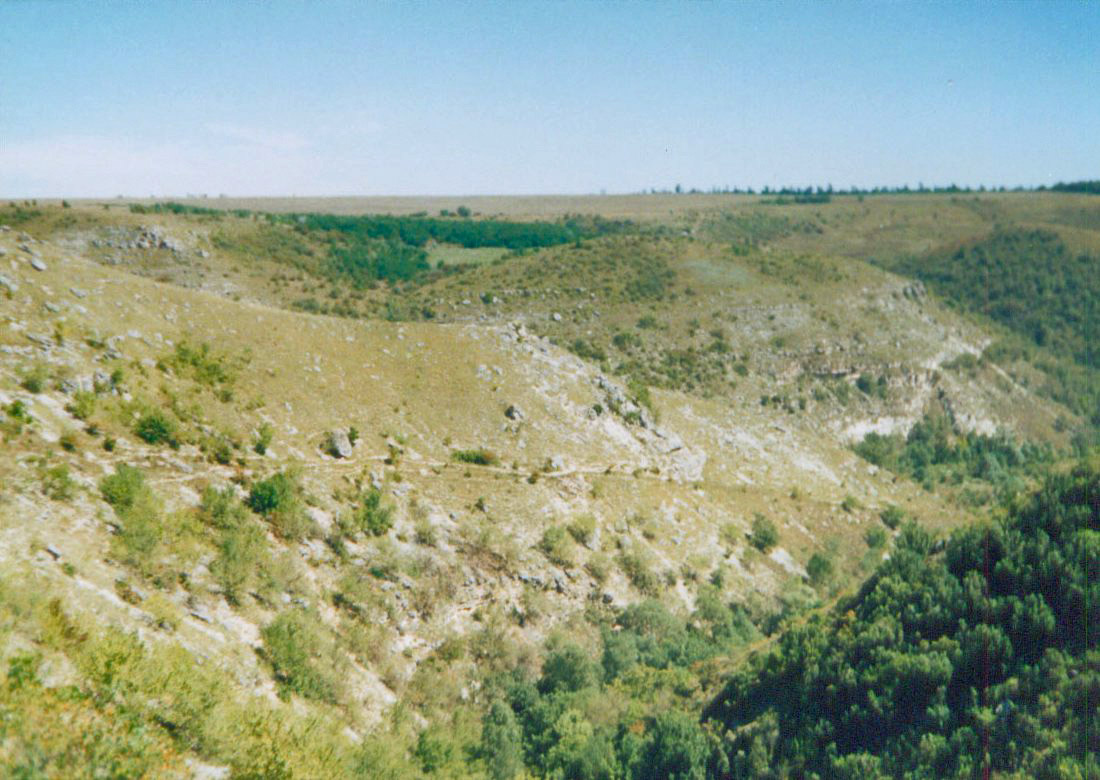

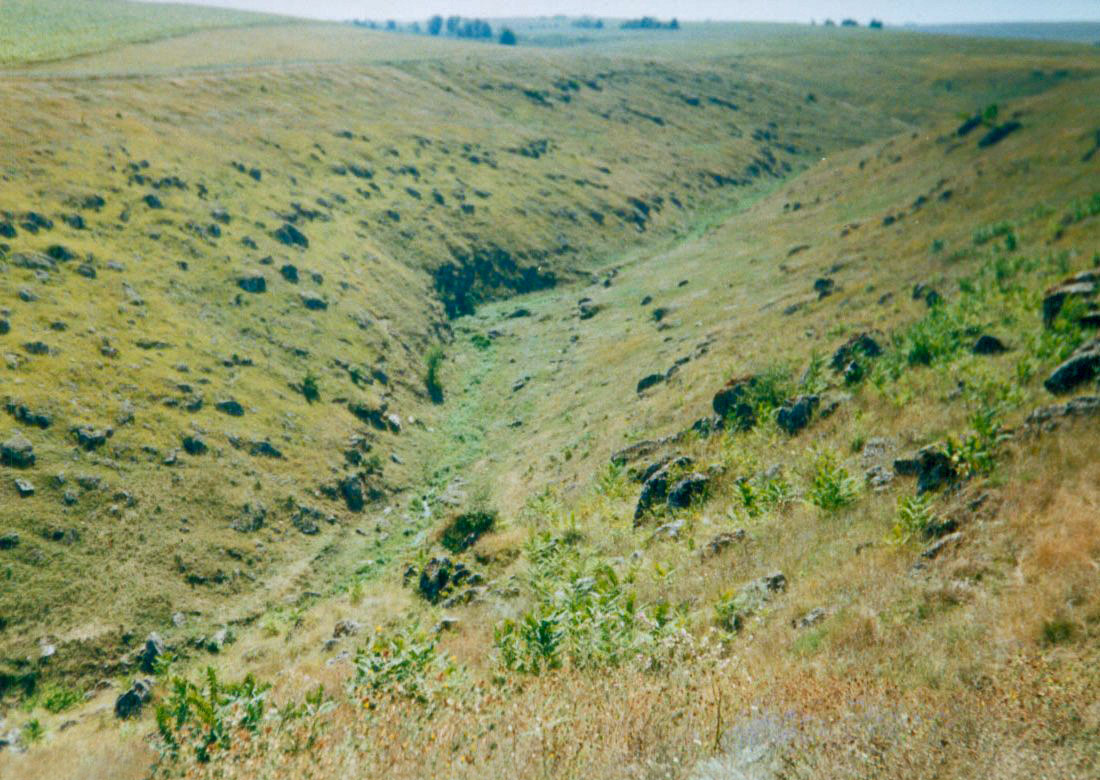

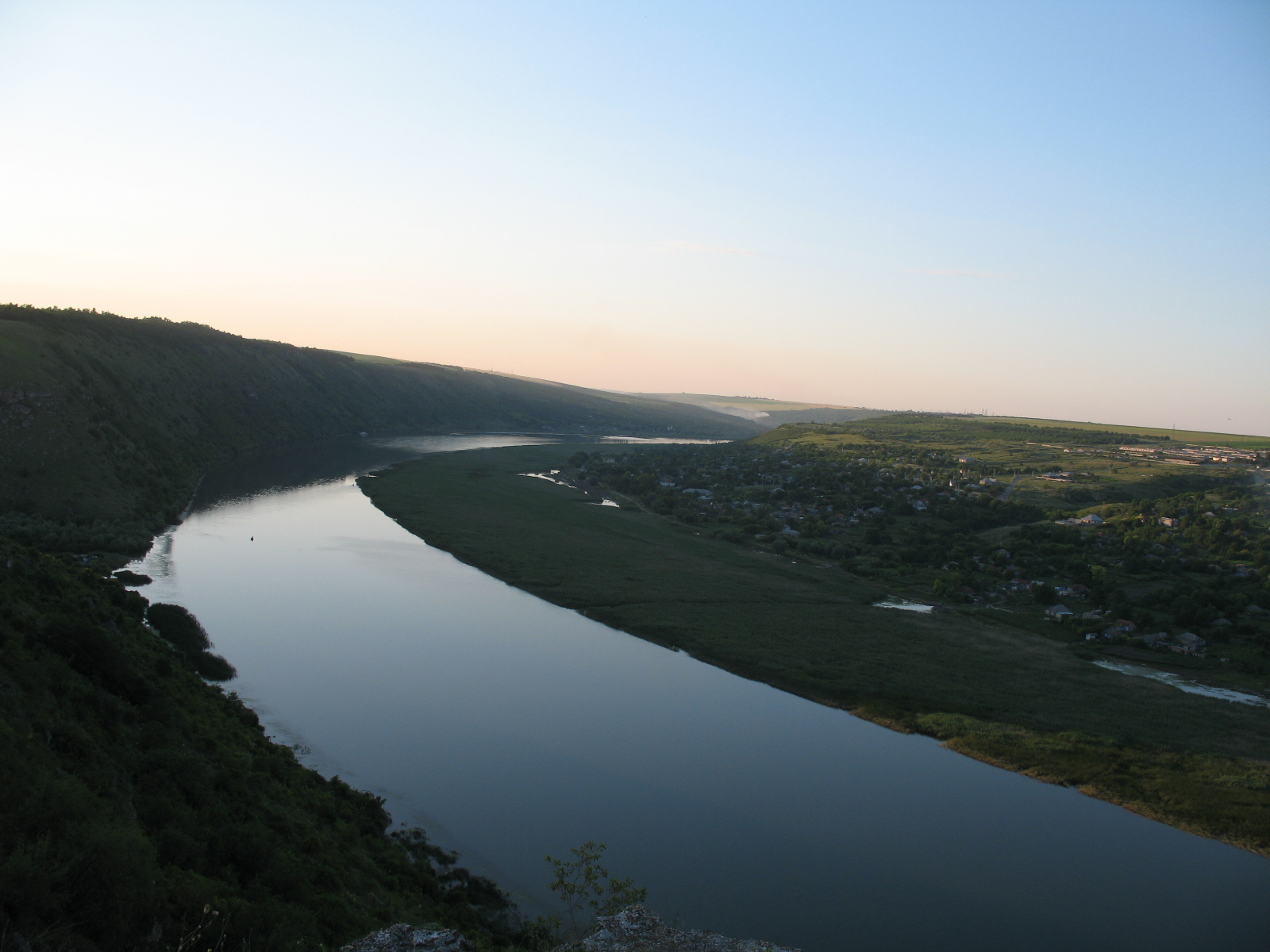

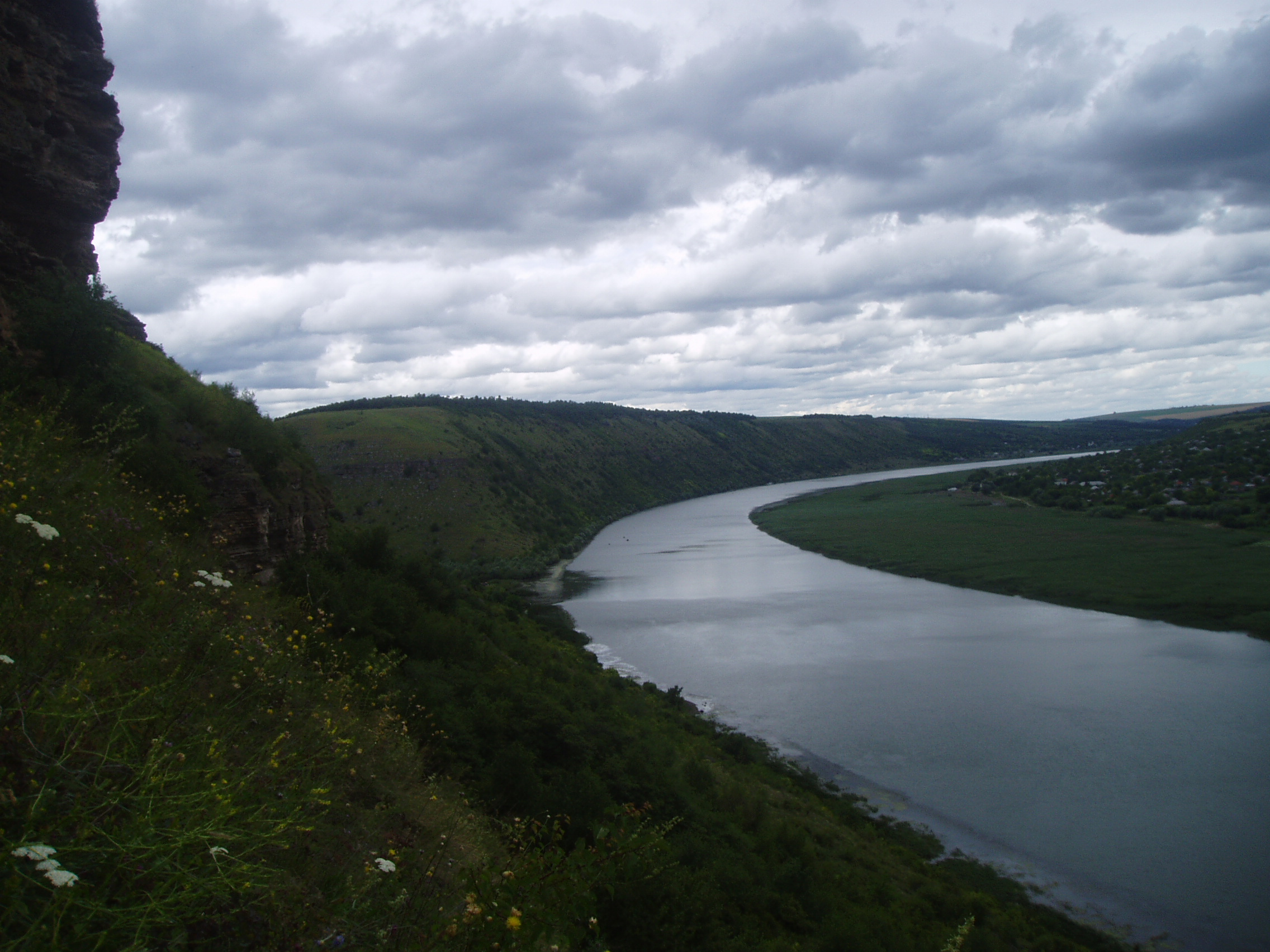

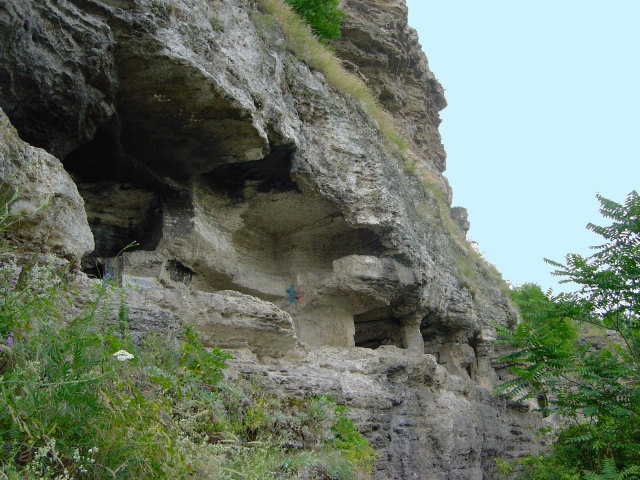
