= Ignăței =

- Village
- Location in Moldova
- Coordinates: 47°41′N 28°40′E
- Country: Moldova
- District: Rezina District

Population (2014 census)
  - Total: 2,018
- Time zone: UTC+2 (EET)
  - Summer (DST): UTC+3 (EEST)

Ignăței is a village in Rezina District, Moldova.

== Notable people ==
- Pavel Cocârlă
- Vasile Bârcă
