= Solonceni =

- Commune
- Location within Moldova
- Coordinates: 47.8283333333°N 29.0058333333°E
- Country: Moldova
- District: Rezina District

Government
  - Mayor: Anatolie Chirtoacă (Alianța Moldova Noastră)

Population (2014)
  - Total: 1,658
- Time zone: UTC+2 (EET)
  - Summer (DST): UTC+3 (EEST)

Solonceni is a commune in Rezina District, Moldova. It is composed of two villages, Solonceni and Tarasova.

In the 1990s, Solonceni operated a small trolleybus system using ZiU-9s hired from Moldova's capital city.

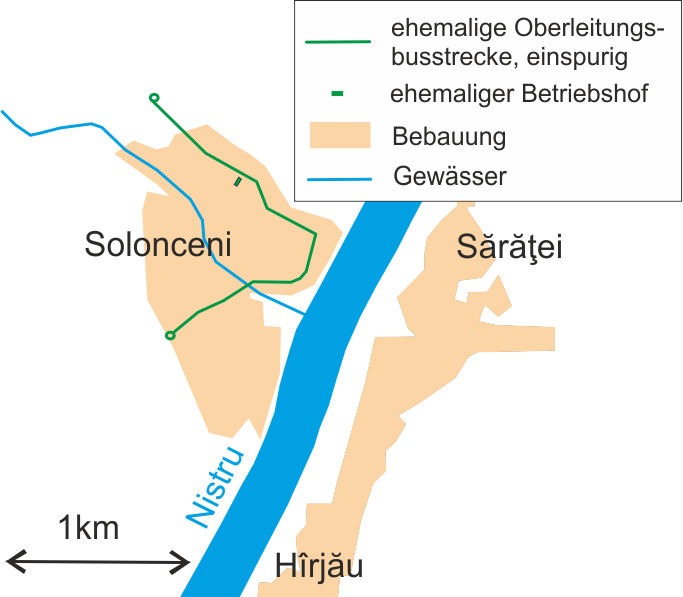
Map of the former Trolleybus line in Solonceni, Moldova (in German)
