= Peciște =

- Village
- Location within Moldova
- Coordinates: 47.7138888889°N 28.7055555556°E
- Country: Moldova
- District: Rezina

Government
  - Mayor: Emanoil Scînteianu (PDM)

Population (2014 census)
  - Total: 1,682
- Time zone: UTC+2 (EET)
  - Summer (DST): UTC+3 (EEST)

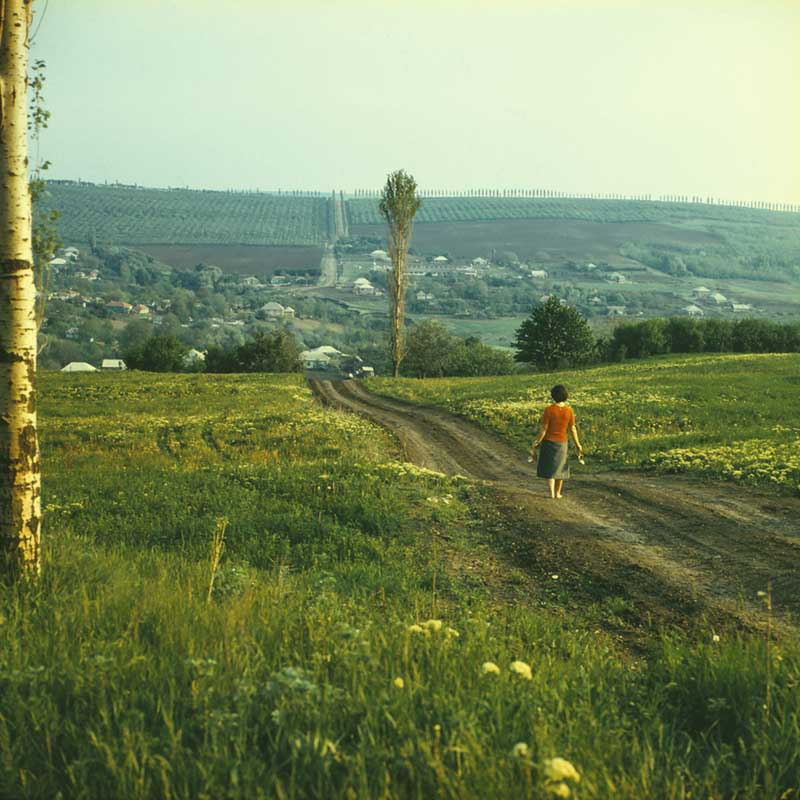
A vintage photograph from 1980 showing the approach to the village of Peciște, Moldova

Peciște is a village in Rezina District, Moldova.
