= Joseph Rabinowitz =

Russian missionary and early Hebrew Christian leader (1837–1899)

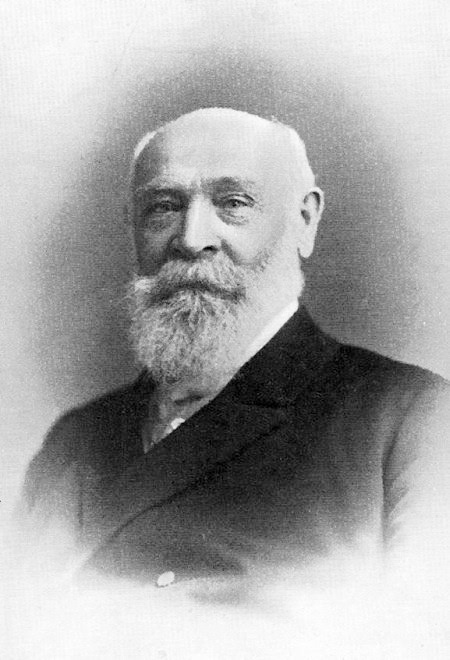

Personal details
- Born: September 23, 1837 Resina, Russian Empire
- Died: May 17, 1899 (aged 61) Odessa, Russian Empire

Joseph Rabinowitz (23 September 1837 – 17 May 1899) was a Russian missionary to the Jews, who founded the Hebrew Christian movement Novy Israel in 1882.

== Biography ==
Rabinowitz was born on 23 September 1837 in Resina, Bessarabia. He was brought up as a Ḥasid, but later acquired some secular knowledge and mastered the Russian language. For a time he practised law in the lower courts of his native town, settling subsequently in Kishinev.

In 1882 he founded the movement Novy Israel, and began to preach Christianity to the Jews of Kishinev. Following immediately upon the founding of the Bibleitzy brotherhood by Jacob Gordin at Elizabethgrad, the new movement attracted much attention, and was freely discussed in Russian newspapers. Rabinowitz succeeded for a time in interesting Christian Hebraist Franz Delitzsch in his movement and in allaying the suspicions of the Russian government, which strictly prohibited the formation of new religious movement and was called sect. But his open conversion to Protestantism had the natural result of estranging many of his followers. He was baptized in Berlin on 24 March 1885.

He died in Odessa on 17 May 1899 and was buried in Kishinev.

== Publications ==
- "Descriptions of Russia". Yearbook for the history of Jews and Judaism'. Leipzig: Institute for the Promoting of Hebrew Literature. 1860–1869.
- Ketuvim le-yeshurun. Published in French as Les souffrances du Messie. Paris: Dépôt Central. 1890.
- Zwei Predigten in dem Gotteshause Bethlehem in Kischinew. Schriften des Institutum Judaicum in Leipzig; Nr. 9. Leipzig: Dörffling & Franke. 1885. hdl:2027/hvd.hngeuh.
- Neue Documente der südrussischen Christentumsbewegung. Schriften des Institutum Judaicum in Leipzig,16. Leipzig: Dörffling & Franke. 1887.
- A Short Biography of Joseph Rabinowitsch of Kishinew, Southern-Russia: With Extracts from His Sermons. K. C. Holter. 1917.
- A Short Biography of Rev. Joseph Rabinowitsch of Kishinew, Russia with Extracts from His Sermons Delivered in Russia and England. K.C. Holter Publishing Company. 1917.
