= Elefterie Sinicliu =

Moldovan politician (1895-?)

Member of the Moldovan Parliament
- In office 1917–1918

Elefterie Sinicliu (born October 4, 1895, Echimăuţi, Orhei - died in 20th century) was an agronomist and politician from Bessarabia, member of the Moldovan Parliament (1917–1918).

== Biography ==
In 1917 he participated in the local congress held in Chișinău. On 27 March / 9 April 1918 he voted for the unification of Bessarabia with Romania. He was an officer in the Bessarabian army and in 1919 he organized the artillery of this province.
