= Echimăuți =

- Village
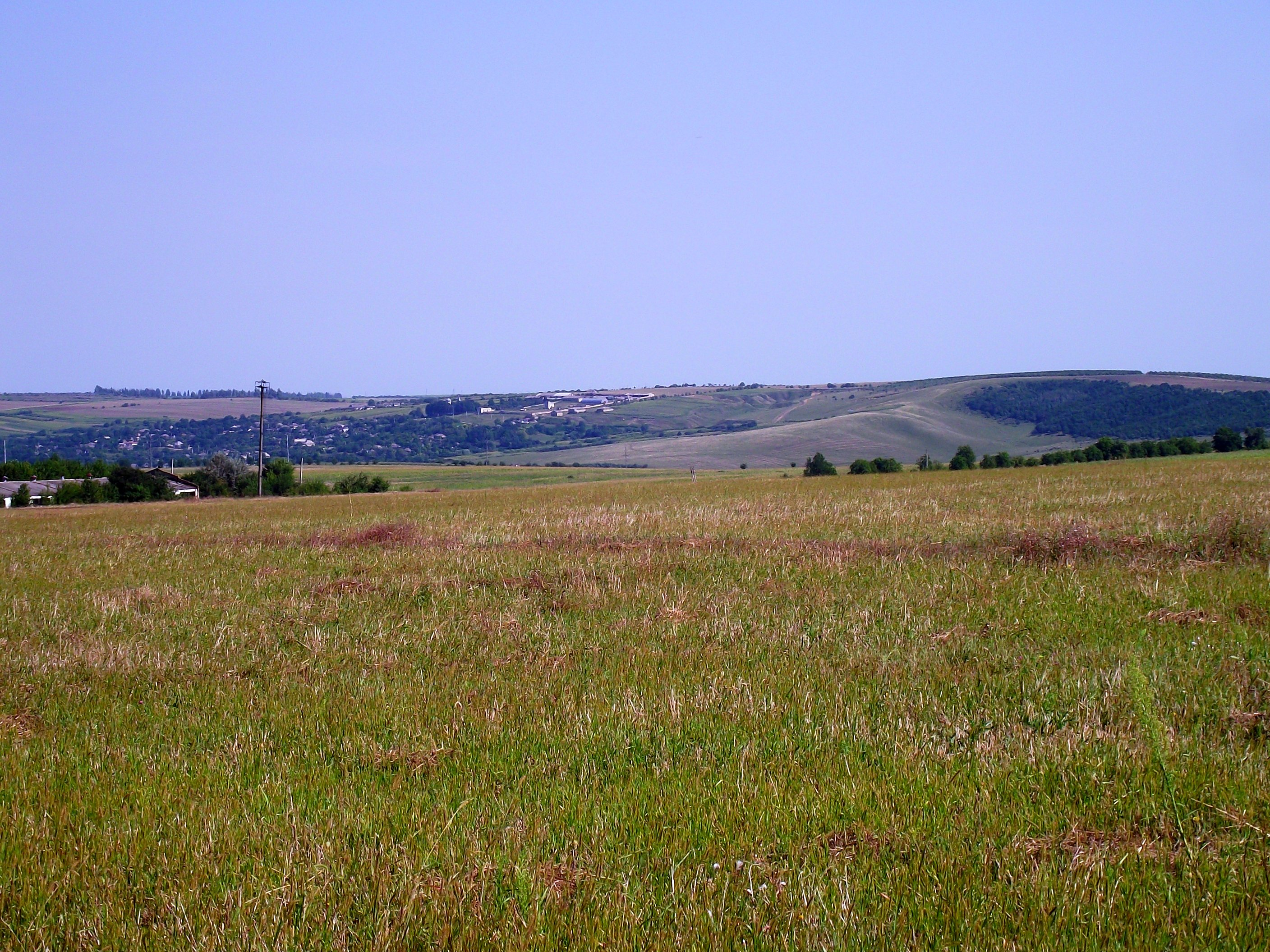

- Location in Moldova
- Coordinates: 47°42′N 28°54′E
- Country: Moldova
- District: Rezina District
- Elevation: 490 ft (150 m)

Population (2014 census)
  - Total: 1,828
- Time zone: UTC+2 (EET)
  - Summer (DST): UTC+3 (EEST)
- Postal code: MD-5416
- Area code: +373 254

Echimăuți is a village in Rezina District, Moldova.

== Notable people ==
- Elefterie Sinicliu
- Meir Dizengoff, first mayor of Tel Aviv
