= Mateuți =

- Village
- Location within Moldova
- Coordinates: 47.8091666667°N 28.9325°E
- Country: Moldova
- District: Rezina

Government
  - Mayor: Angela Ursachi (PL)

Population (2014 census)
  - Total: 1,857
- Time zone: UTC+2 (EET)
  - Summer (DST): UTC+3 (EEST)

Mateuți is a village in Rezina District, Moldova.
