= Pavel Cocârlă =

Bessarabian politician

Member of the Moldovan Parliament
- In office 1917–1918

Personal details
- Born: 1893 Ignăței, Bessarabia
- Died: Unknown

Pavel Cocârlă (born 1893 in Ignăței, Bessarabia) was a Bessarabian politician.

== Biography ==
He served as Member of the Moldovan Parliament (1917–1918).

== Gallery ==
Moldovan stamp, 1998

== Bibliography ==
- Gheorghe E. Cojocaru, Sfatul Țării: itinerar, Civitas, Chişinău, 1998, ISBN 9975-936-20-2
- Mihai Taşcă, Sfatul Țării şi actualele autorităţi locale, "Timpul de dimineaţă", no. 114 (849), June 27, 2008 (page 16)
