= Rezina District =

Coordinates: 47°40′N 28°50′E

Rezina
- District (Raion)
- Flag Coat of arms

- Country: Republic of Moldova
- Administrative center (Oraş-reşedinţă): Rezina
- Established: 2002

Government
  - Raion president: Teodor Cuculescu (PDCM, 2023)

Area
  - Total: 621.8 km^{2} (240.1 sq mi)

Population (2024)
  - Total: 30,243
  - Density: 48.64/km^{2} (126.0/sq mi)
- Time zone: UTC+2 (EET)
  - Summer (DST): UTC+3 (EEST)
- Area code: +373 54
- Car plates: RZ
- Website: consiliul.rezina.md

Rezina is a district (Romanian: raion) in the east of Moldova, with the administrative center at Rezina. Rezina is situated on the western bank of the Nistru river. As of the 2024 Moldovan census, its population was 30,243.

== History ==
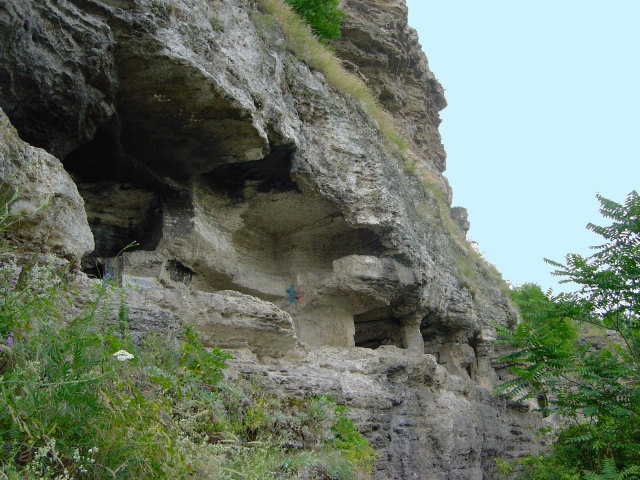
Tipova cave monastery (10th-12th century)

The first human settlements on the territory of the district today appeared in the Neolithic era (7th-5th millennium BC). Near villages Solonceni, Echimăuţi and Stohnaia and found traces of the existence of territorial and cultural community of families of related tribes. Fertile soil, suitable for cattle breeding and agriculture, water and forests bank, which is a good shelter, were elements that favored flat settlements in these places. Dacians inhabited these territories 2nd millennium BC - 5th century AD. 1st century BC Dacian leader Burebista, unites dacian communities, forming a unitary Dacian state. This state called Dacia, included the present territory of Rezina district. In the 10th-12th centuries a monastery was built near Tipova. The monastery is carved from a giant limestone rock and includes 18 caves, connected by internal passages. It is one of the most important buildings (cave monastery) on the banks of the Nistru river. District towns, with the earliest historical attestation are Horodiste and Pecişte documented during 1437–1466. The first evidence of Rezina, a village landlord, we find a document of 5 February 1495 that prince of Stephan the Great, strengthens his Toader, Rezina village where he was Alexa Vataman, at the mouth of Rezina river purchased from his relatives, grandchildren of the great Negrea 70 Tatars zloty. In the 16th-18th centuries, further develop the region's economic, cultural and shows a marked increase in the population. In 1812, Treaty of Bucharest divides Basarabia from the Principality of Moldova, the first being ceded to Russia. In 1918, after the collapse of the Russian Empire, Basarabia decide union with the motherland Romania, during this period (1918–1944) district, is part of Orhei County. Basarabia is again busy this time of the USSR after the Molotov–Ribbentrop Treaty. In 1991, as a result of the proclamation of Independence of Moldova, part of the Soroca County (1991–2003), and in 2003, became administrative unit of Moldova.

== Geography ==
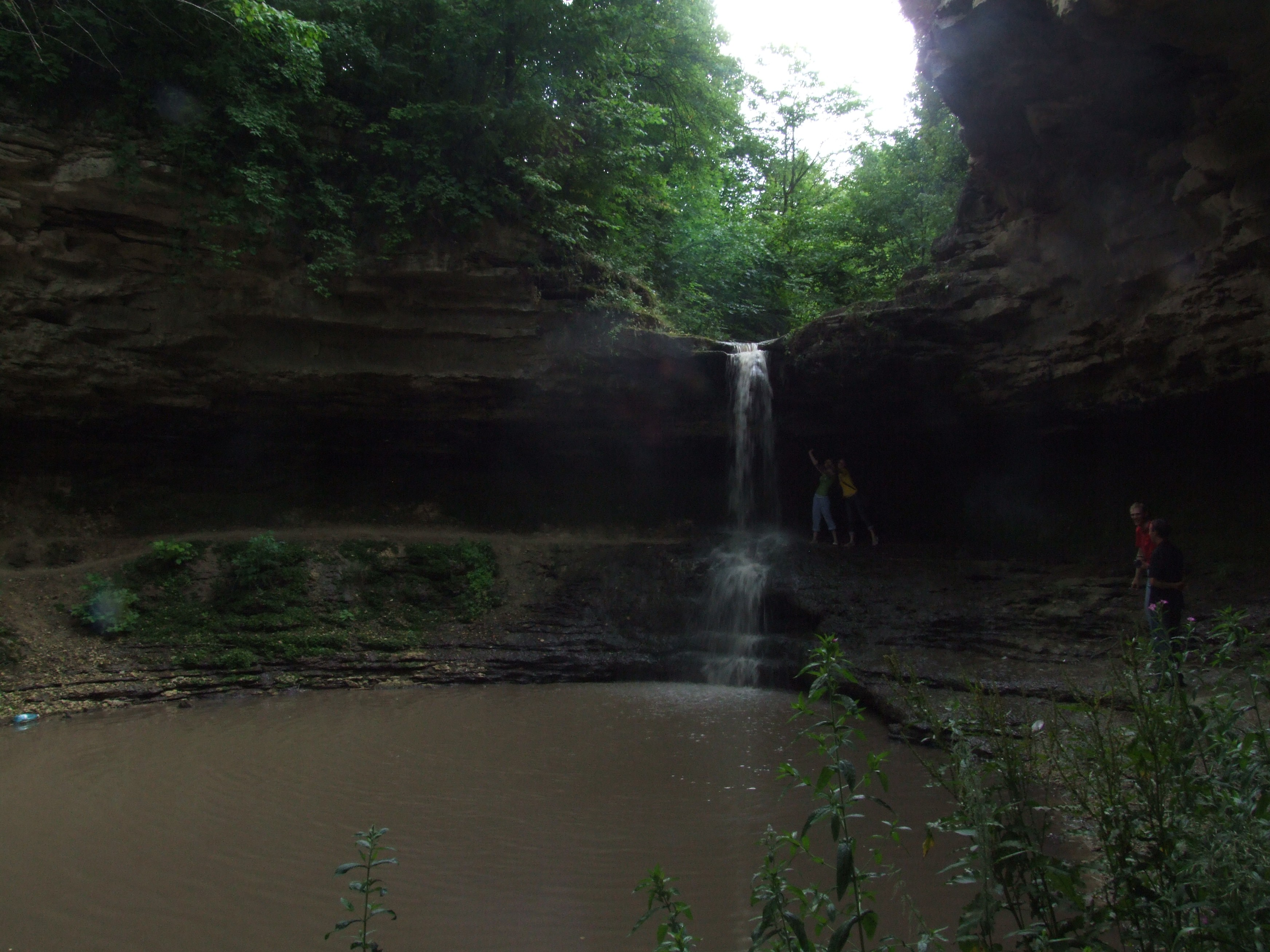
Waterfall nearby Saharna monastery

Rezina district is located in the central-eastern part of Moldova. Does neighborhood Şoldăneşti District in the north, to the east with Rîbnița District, in south Orhei District and Teleneşti District in the west. District is located, Nistru Plateau, has a rugged terrain, with a strong erosion process. Throughout the district, situated on the river Nistru, is very picturesque. Of particular interest has two nature reserves: Saharna (670 ha) and Tipova (430 ha). Of rare beauty is Saharna river, forming small 22 waterfalls. Among the most impressive are "Gypsy Falls" with a height of 4 m and 6 m wide. Tipova nature reserve, covers the old terraces of the Nistru River and Tipova river valleys, which flows through the gorge, forming several waterfalls with a height of 10–16 m. District has mineral resources like gravel, sand, clay, stone and raw material for cement.

=== Climate ===
District has a warm climate, temperate, climate influenced by the Eastern Carpathians and Ukrainian Plain. The average annual temperature in this area is between 8 °C (46 °F) and 9 °C (48 °F), in winter −4 to −4.5 °C (25 to 24 °F), sometimes reaching −25 °C (−13 °F), and 35 to 40 °C (95 to 104 °F) in summer. In the present climate of this area has become warmer than bank last century. The fact is explained, as is known, the evolution of warm climate in Western and Eastern Europe, the temperature change caused by different natural and human factors.

=== Fauna ===
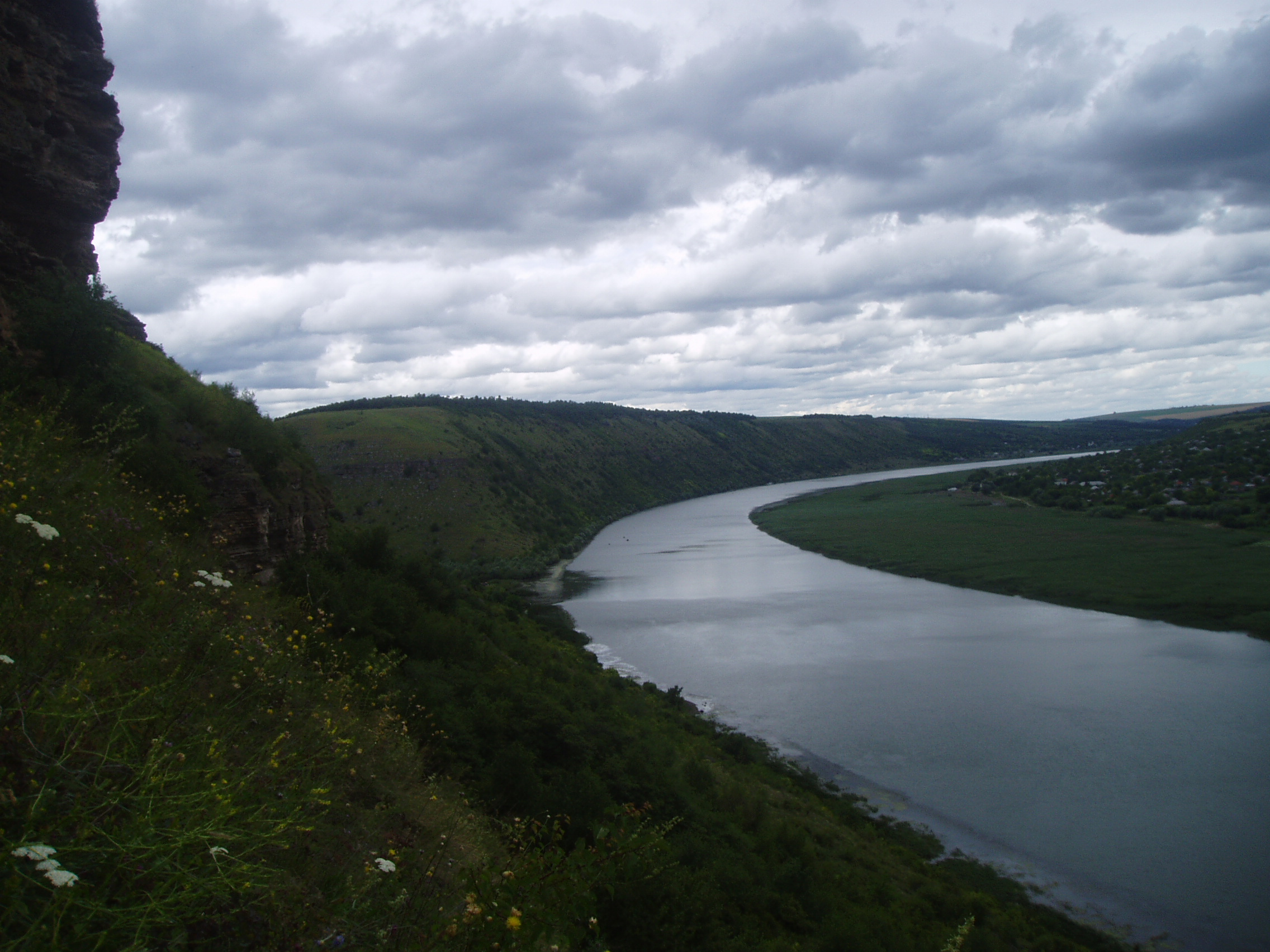
Nistru near the Lalova

Fauna are typical of Central Europe with: red fox, European badger, raccoon dog, deer, wild boar, Eurasian wolf, brown rat, marten, European wildcat and others. Birds include: stork, egret, swan, mallard, seagull, hawk, tits, common raven, nightingale, eagle, starling, crow and owl.

=== Flora ===
Forests are composed of oak, ash, linden, maple, locust and others. Herbal vegetation of rocky limestone slopes features: fescue, clover, knotweed, etc.

=== Rivers ===
District is located in the Nistru river basin, with its tributaries Saharna and Tipova, which crosses the district. In the district meet the waterfalls, springs and wells.

== Administrative subdivisions ==
- Localities: 41
  - Administrative center: Rezina
    - Cities: Rezina
      - Villages: 16
        - Communes: 24

== Demographics ==
In the 2024 Census, the district population was 30,243 of which 25.1% urban and 74.9% rural population.

=== Ethnic groups ===
Ethnic group	% of total
Moldovans *	90.9
Romanians *	5.8
Ukrainians	1.9
Russians	1.0
Gagauz	0.1
Bulgarians	0.1
Romani	0.1
Other	0.2
Undeclared	0.1

Footnote: * There is an ongoing controversy regarding the ethnic identification of Moldovans and Romanians.

=== Religion ===
- Christians - 99.4%
  - Orthodox Christians - 97.6%
  - Protestant - 1.7%
  - Catholics - 0.1%
- Other - 0.1%
- No Religion - 0.2%
- Not Declared - 0.2%

== Economy ==
In the district are 8264 registered entities, including the right person - 7645 including: individual enterprises - 578, peasant households - 7067, with the right of legal person - 19 (SRL, SA, joint ventures). Share 34 461 ha is agricultural land (55.5%) of the total land surface.

== Education ==
In Rezina district operates 41 educational institutions, including schools - 38 of which: 7 - 3235 students studying in high schools, 5 - middle schools with 2719 pupils, 20 - secondary schools with 2719 pupils, 6 - primary schools with 102 students, 24 preschool - with 1474 children, 1 - professional schools with 242 students, 1 - auxiliary school with 164 children, 1 - music school with 70 children, 1 - 68 arts school children. Currently in educational institutions in the district operates 924 teachers.

== Politics ==
Rezina is a larger district with this center-right parties. PCRM during the 2001-2009 election had more than 50% of the vote is now in constant decay. District is one of the founding members of Euroregion Dniester.

During the last three elections AEI had an increase of 74.8%

Parliament elections results
Year	AEI	PCRM
2010	51.30% 12,540	39.40% 9,631
July 2009	46.00% 10,786	48.83% 11,376
April 2009	31.66% 7,172	55.52% 12,611

=== Elections ===
Summary of 28 November 2010 Parliament of Moldova election results in Rezina District
Parties and coalitions	Votes	%	+/−
Party of Communists of the Republic of Moldova	9,631	39.40	−9.43
Liberal Democratic Party of Moldova	6,797	27.81	+8.57
Democratic Party of Moldova	3,588	14.68	+3.24
Liberal Party	1,890	7.73	−2.92
European Action Movement	841	3.44	+3.44
United Moldova	304	1.24	+1.24
Christian Democratic People's Party	301	1.23	−2.24
Party Alliance Our Moldova	265	1.08	−3.89
Other Party	834	3.39	+1.99
Total (turnout 62.03%)	24,625	100.00	

== Culture ==
Works: Museums - 1, Public libraries - 36 homes and houses of culture - 35, Artistic education institutions - 3, Enable artistic - 116, 19 bands which holds the band model, institutions of social assistance are Section Social and Family Protection and nursing "Grandma's House."

== Health ==
In district works: family medical center - one, the hospital district - one, the resort to emergency care - 1, health center - 5, family doctors' offices - 16, medical centers - 11, state pharmacies - 1, 28 pharmaceutical kiosks, private pharmacies - 3 in town and four in villages. In the field of public health, the district operates 63 physicians.

== Personalities ==
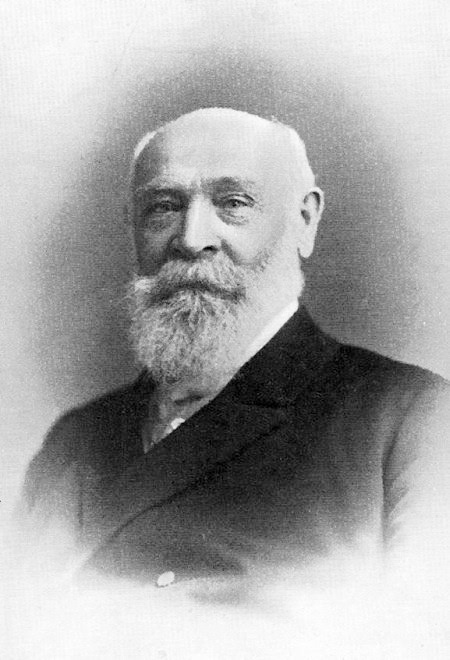
Joseph Rabinowitz

- Alexandru Cotruţă - Basarabian politician
- Joseph Rabinowitz - Lawyer, founder of the first Jewish Christian congregation in Russia
- Nicolae Checerul Cuş - Politician, member of the Sfatul Țării (1917–1918)
- Nicolae Josan - Moldovan footballer, currently evolving to Anzhi Makhachkala
