= Meir Dizengoff =

Early Zionist leader and first mayor of Tel Aviv

- מֵאִיר דִּיזֶנְגּוֹף
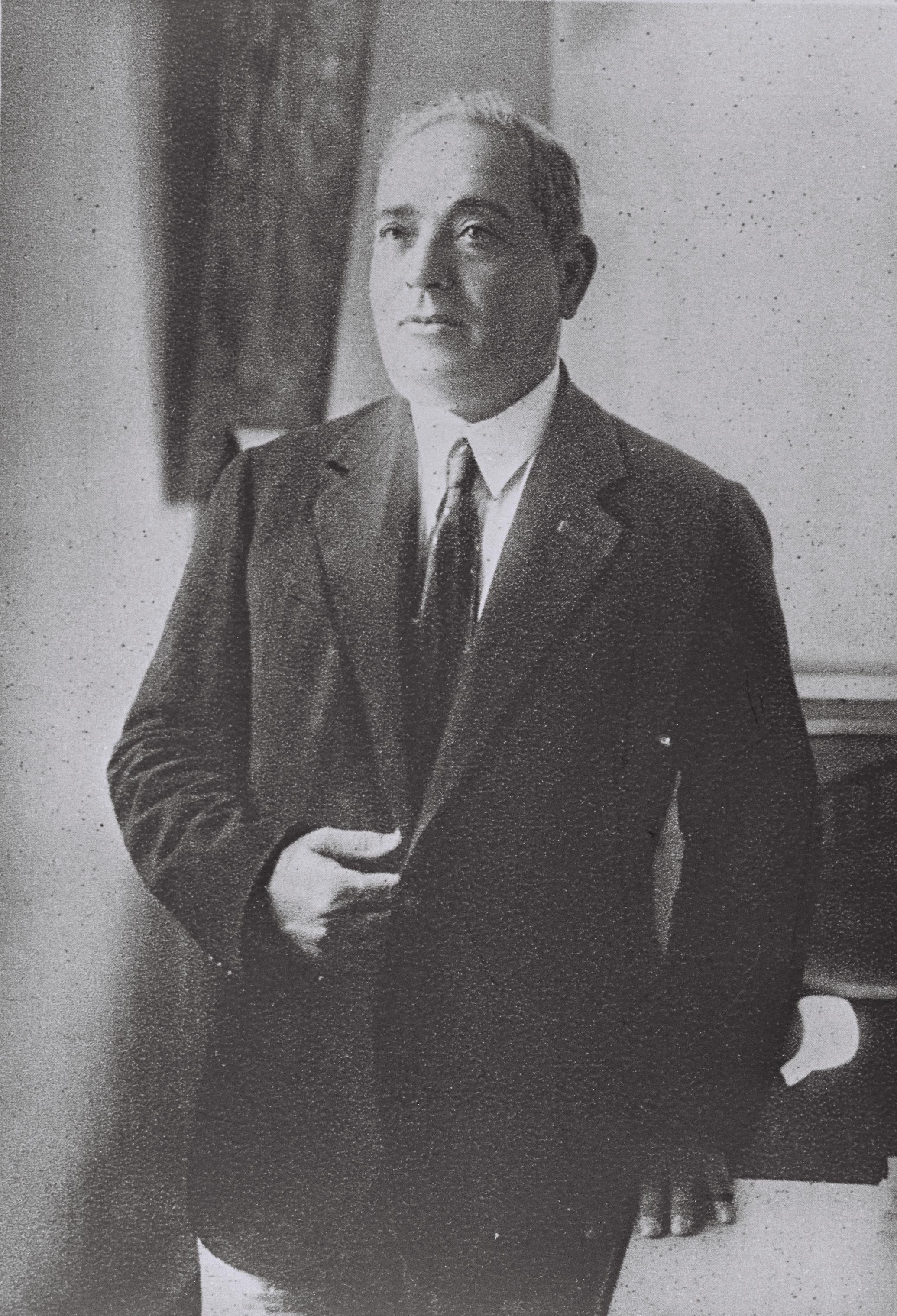

1st Mayor of Tel Aviv
- In office 1921–1925
- Succeeded by: David Bloch-Blumenfeld

3rd Mayor of Tel Aviv
- In office 1927 – 23 September 1936
- Preceded by: David Bloch-Blumenfeld
- Succeeded by: Moshe Chelouche

Personal details
- Born: Meer Yankelevich Dizengof; 25 February 1861 Ekimovtsy, Bessarabia
- Died: 23 September 1936 (aged 75) Tel Aviv, Mandatory Palestine
- Party: General Zionists
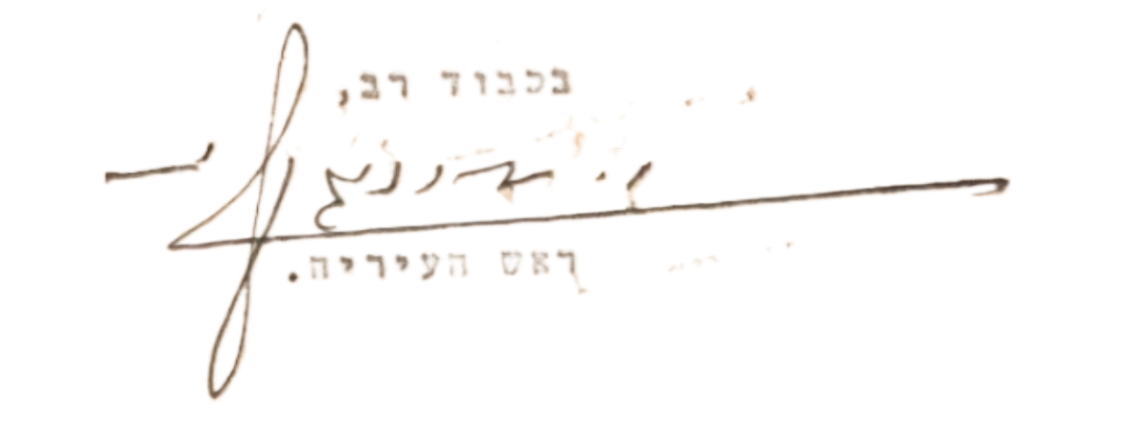
- Signature

Meir Dizengoff (Hebrew: מֵאִיר דִּיזֶנְגּוֹף; born Meer Yankelevich Dizengof, Russian: Меер Янкелевич Дизенгоф); 25 February 1861 – 23 September 1936) was a Zionist leader and politician and the founder and first mayor of Tel Aviv (1911–1922 as head of town planning, 1922–1936 as mayor). Dizengoff's actions in Ottoman Palestine and the British Mandate for Palestine helped lead to the creation of the State of Israel. David Ben-Gurion declared Israeli independence in 1948 at Dizengoff's residence in Tel Aviv. Dizengoff House is now Israel's Independence Hall.

== Early life ==
Meir Dizengoff was born on Shushan Purim, 25 February 1861 in the village of Ekimovtsy near Orhei, Bessarabia. His father was a follower of the Hasidic master of Sadigura, and his mother was the descendant of a rabbinic dynasty. In 1878, his family moved to Kishinev, where he graduated from high school and studied at the polytechnic school.

In 1882, he volunteered in the Imperial Russian Army, serving in Zhytomyr (now in Ukraine) until 1884. There he first met Zina Brenner, whom he married in Alexandria on his way back to Ottoman Palestine in the early 1890s.

After his military service, Dizengoff remained in Odessa, where he became involved in the Narodnaya Volya underground. In 1885, he was arrested for insurgency and spent 8 months in jail. In Odessa, he met Leon Pinsker, Ahad Ha’am and others, and joined the Hovevei Zion movement.

Upon his release from prison in 1886, Dizengoff returned to Kishinev and founded the Bessarabian branch of Hovevei Zion, which he represented at the 1887 conference.

He left Kishinev in 1888 to study chemical engineering at the Sorbonne in Paris. At the Sorbonne he met Elie Scheid, a representative of Baron Edmond de Rothschild's projects in Ottoman Palestine.

== Zionist leadership ==
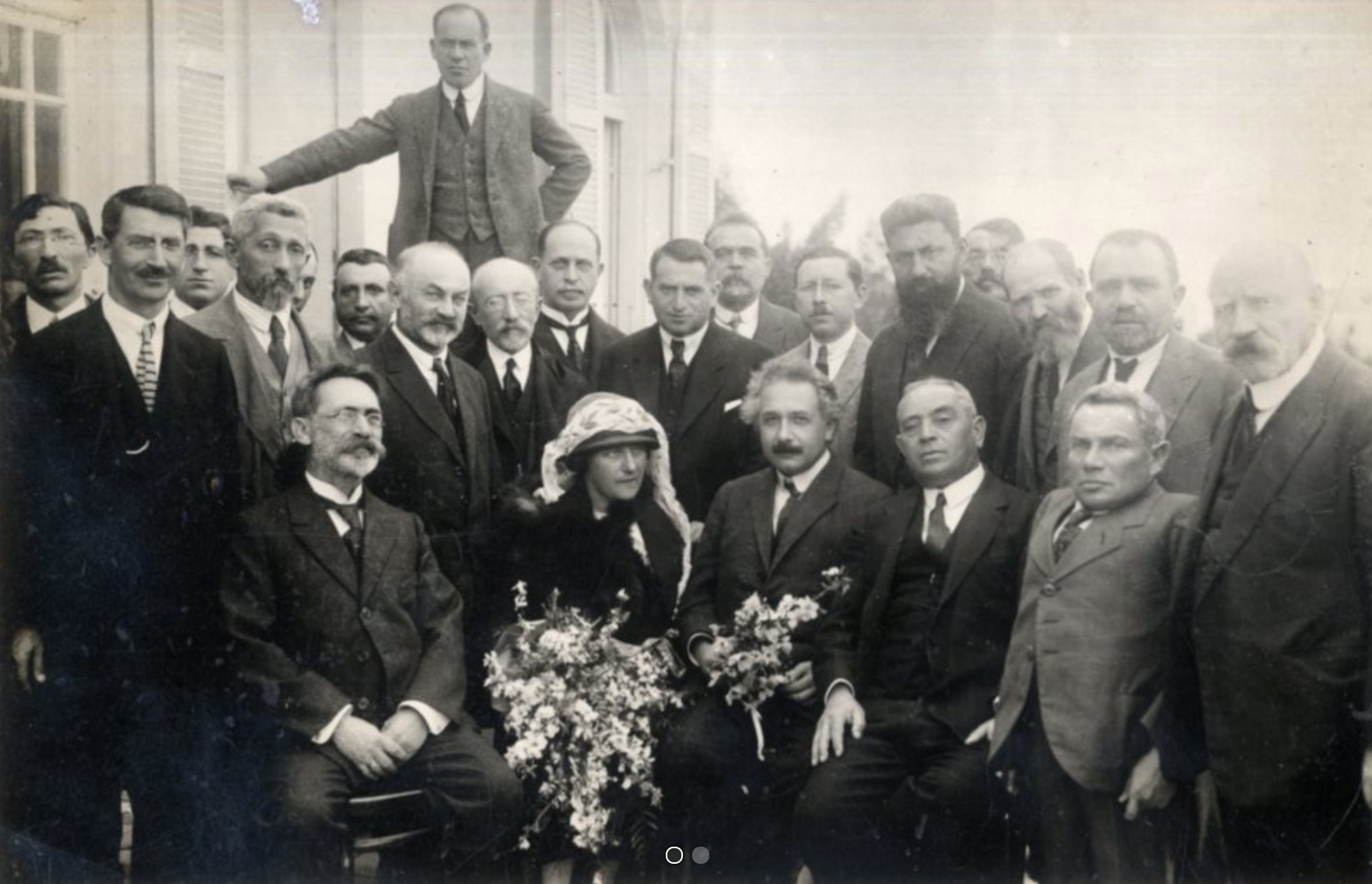
Albert Einstein meeting with Meir Dizengoff

In Kishinev Dizengoff met Theodor Herzl and became an ardent follower. However, Dizengoff strongly opposed the British Uganda Scheme promoted by Herzl at the Sixth Zionist Congress. Instead, Dizengoff favored the formation of Jewish communities in Palestine. Dizengoff became actively involved in land purchases and establishment of Jewish communities, most notably Tel Aviv.

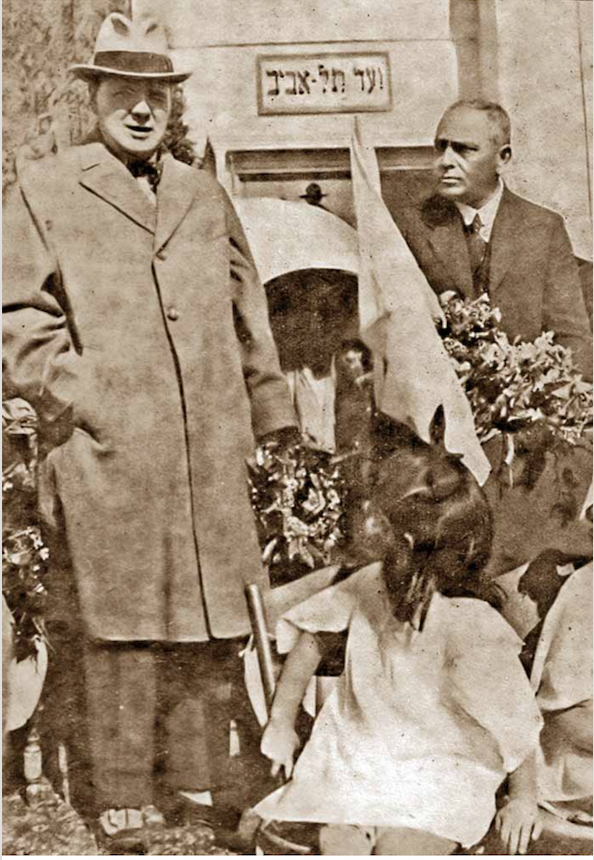
Winston Churchill meeting with Meir Dizengoff in Tel Aviv

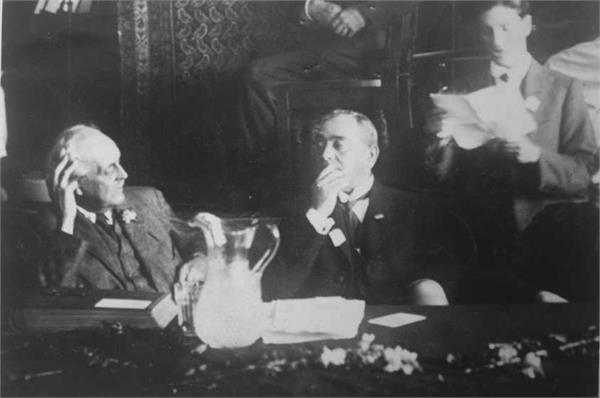
Meir Dizengoff with Arthur Balfour 1925

Winston Churchill visited Palestine in March 1921 and met with Dizengoff. During a ceremonial speech with Churchill, Dizengoff declared: “this small town of Tel Aviv, which is hardly 12 years old, has been conquered by us on sand dunes, and we have built it with our work and our exertions.” Churchill was impressed with the motivation and determination of the pioneers, under the leadership of Dizengoff. In Palestine, Churchill told an anti-Zionist delegation: “This country has been very much neglected in the past and starved and even mutilated by Turkish misgovernment… you can see with your own eyes in many parts of this country the work which has already been done by Jewish colonies; how sandy wastes have been reclaimed and thriving farms and orangeries planted in their stead.” That same day he told a Jewish delegation he would inform London that the Zionists are “transforming waste into fertile... planting trees and developing agriculture in desert lands... making for an increase in wealth and cultivation" and further that the Arab population is “deriving great benefit, sharing in the general improvement and advancement.”

== Business ventures ==
While studying chemical engineering at the University of Paris, Dizengoff met Edmond James de Rothschild, who sent him to Ottoman-ruled Palestine to establish a glass factory which would supply bottles for Rothschild's wineries. Dizengoff opened the factory in Tantura in 1892, but it proved unsuccessful due to impurities in the sand. At this time Dizengoff's wife contracted malaria. Since she was pregnant, her doctors advised that she go to Paris. There she gave birth to a girl, but the baby soon died. The couple never had any additional children. After this tragedy and the failure of the bottle factory, Dizengoff soon returned to Kishinev.

In 1904, Dizengoff helped establish the Geulah company, which bought up land in Palestine from Arabs, and became involved in the import business, especially machinery and automobiles to replace the horse-drawn carriages that had served as the primary transportation from Jaffa port to Jerusalem and other towns. In 1905, Dizengoff returned to Palestine and settled in Jaffa. Dizengoff also co-founded a boat company that bore his name, and served as the Belgian consul. When Dizengoff learned that residents were organizing to build a new neighborhood, Tel Aviv, he formed a partnership with the Ahuzat Bayit company and bought land on the outskirts of Jaffa, which was parceled out to the early settlers by lot.

== Founding of Tel Aviv ==
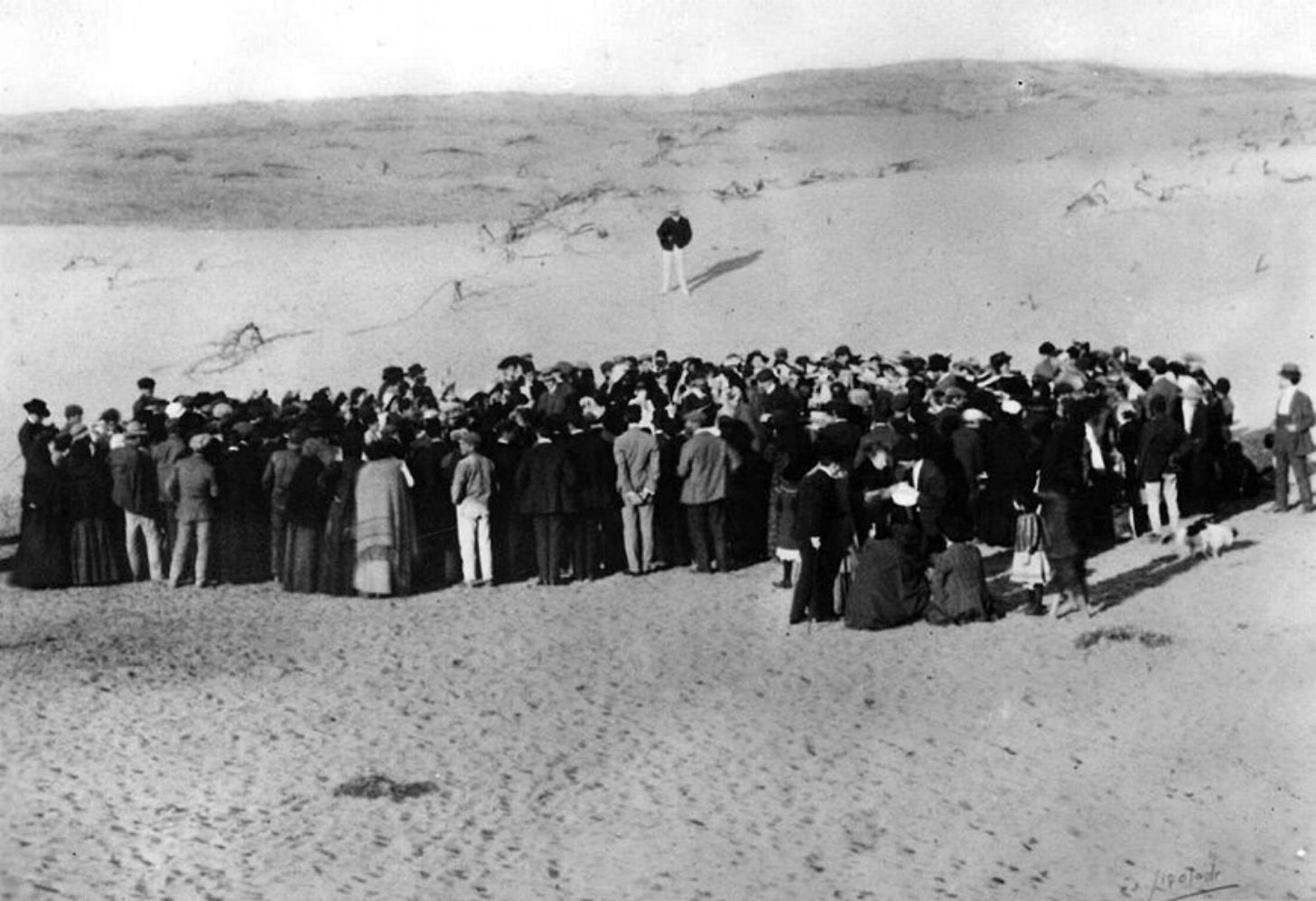
Founding of Tel Aviv

After Akiva Aryeh Weiss founded the Ahuzat Bayit housing association in 1906, Dizengoff joined him to help to establish a modern Jewish quarter near the Arab city of Jaffa in 1909.

On April 11, 1909, sixty-six families gathered on the sandy shoreline using sea shells in a lottery to divide up lots of what was renamed Tel Aviv in 1910. Dizengoff participated in the lottery, which was captured on film by Abraham Suskind. In the iconic image, members of the collective can be seen standing on sand dunes in the exact location where Rothschild Boulevard currently runs. According to legend, the man standing behind the group, on the slope of the sand dune, is a man who opposed the idea, allegedly telling the others that they are mad because there is no water at the location.

== Mayor of Tel Aviv ==
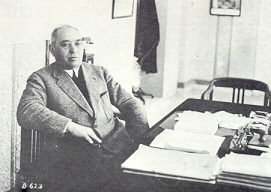
Meir Dizengoff

Dizengoff and his wife were among the first sixty-six families who gathered on 11 April 1909 on a sand dune north of Jaffa to hold a lottery to distribute plots of land which established what eventually became the city of Tel Aviv.

Dizengoff became head of the town planning in 1911, a position that he held until 1922. When Tel Aviv was recognized as a city, Dizengoff was elected mayor. He remained in office until shortly before his death, apart from a three-year hiatus in 1925–1928. During World War I, the Ottomans drove out a large part of the population and Dizengoff was the liaison between the exiles and the Ottoman authorities. In this position he dealt with aid sent to the exiles of Tel Aviv and received the nickname Reish Galuta. He widely circulated and publicized the plight of the exiles, mainly via newspapers, and succeeded in convincing the rulers to agree to a regular supply of food and provisions to the exiles. In 1917, after having received funding from Nili, Dizengoff refused not only to provide funds to free Nili member Yosef Lishansky, but even funds to provide the succor that Dizengoff provided other prisoners and even anti-Zionists, despite having received the money from Nili.

Right after the Arab riots of April–May 1921, he persuaded the authorities of the British Mandate to recognize Tel Aviv as an independent municipality and not a part of Jaffa. In the early 1920s Dizengoff was able to entice several cultural icons to live in Tel Aviv. After Asher Zvi Ginzberg, known as Ahad Ha'Am, arrived in Israel in 1922, Dizengoff offered him a teaching position at Tel Aviv's first Hebrew-speaking high school, Herzliya Gymnasium. Although Ginzberg was living in Jerusalem at the time, the offer of a job, and a house on the newly named Ahad Ha'Am Street, convinced the Zionist philosopher to move to Tel Aviv. The poet Hayim Nahman Bialik also decided not to move to Jerusalem due to Dizengoff's offer of a house, a job and a street named after him if he moved to Tel Aviv, which he did in 1924. The artist Reuven Rubin also was persuaded by Dizengoff to move to Tel Aviv.

Many committees and associations came into being during Dizengoff's term as mayor. One was the Levant Fair (Hebrew Yarid HaMizrah) committee, founded in 1932, which organized its first fair that year. Initially, the fair was held in the south of the city, but after its great success, a fairground with designated buildings was built in north Tel Aviv. A large international fair was held in 1934, followed by a second fair two years later.

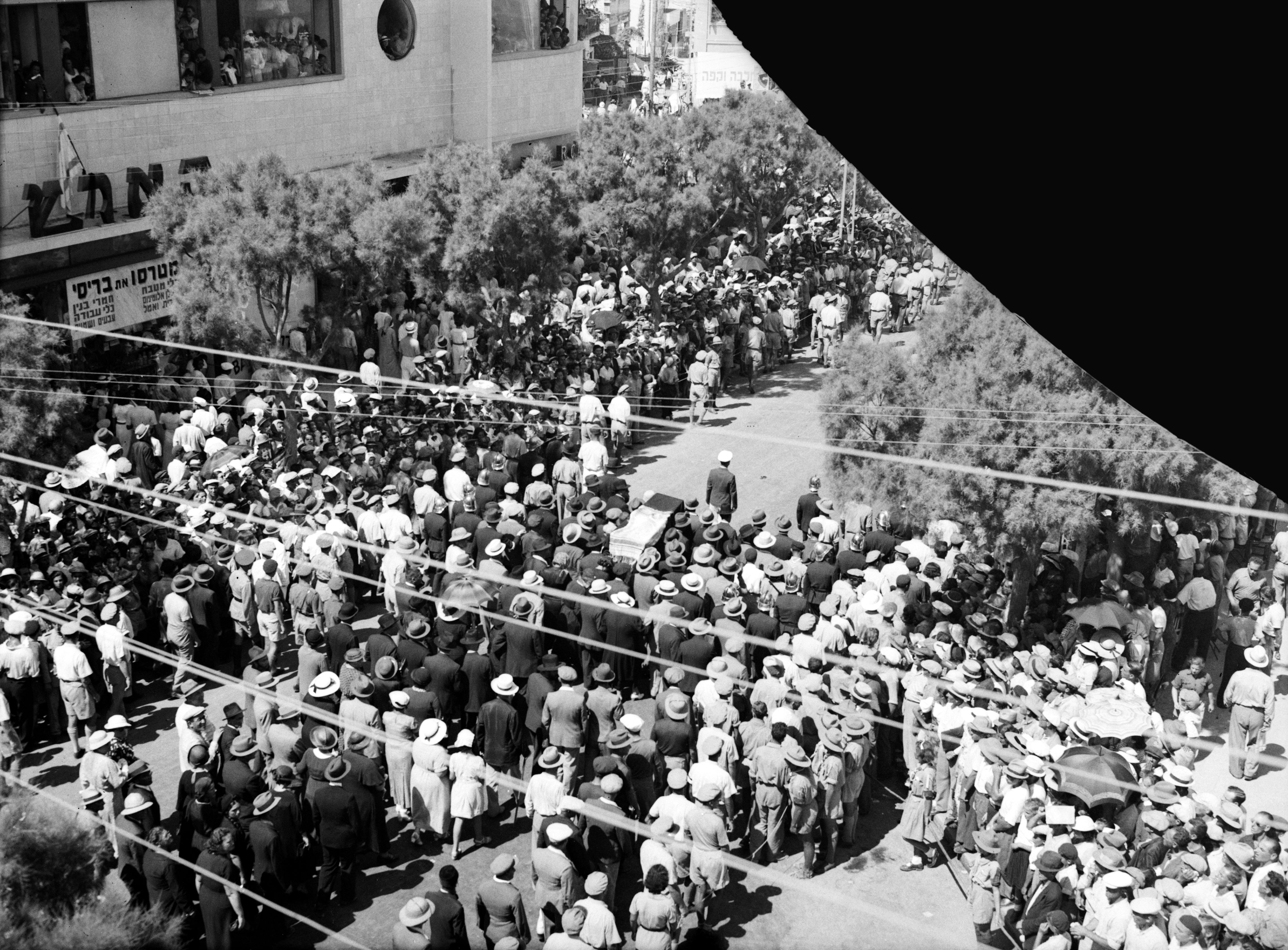
Meir Dizengoff's funeral, 24 September 1936, Tel Aviv. Photo by Matson Photo Service.

Dizengoff was consequently involved with the development of the city, and encouraged its rapid expansion—carrying out daily inspections, and paying attention to details such as entertainment. He was usually present at the head of the Adloyada, the annual Purim carnival. After his wife's death, he donated his house to the city of Tel Aviv, for use as an art museum, and he influenced many important artists to donate their work to improve the museum.

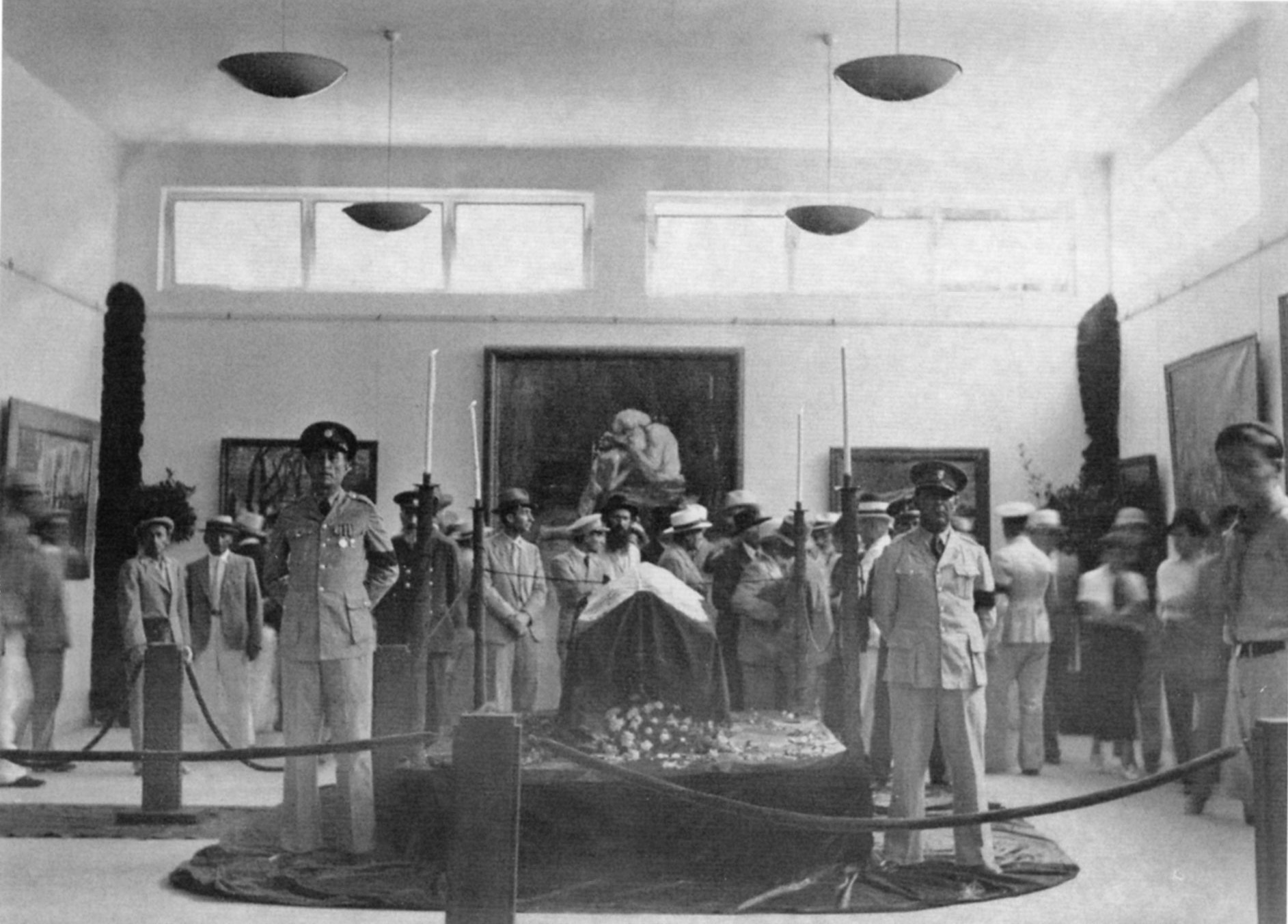
Dizengoff's coffin, lying in the Tel Aviv museum of art, 1939

On a visit to Paris, Dizengoff created an artistic committee. Marc Chagall wrote: “Mr. Dizengoff came to me in Paris, asking for help in building a museum. I couldn’t believe the man was seventy years old, his eyes sparkled…though I intended several times to go to the Land of Israel, and every time I cancelled the trip- this time, Mr. Dizengoff’s enthusiasm influenced me.. I packed my things and decided to give him a hand.”

In June 1931, Marc Chagall and his family traveled to Tel Aviv, on the invitation of Dizengoff, to help establish a Jewish Museum of Art. They stayed at Dizengoff's house in the city.

In 1936, with the outbreak of the Arab revolt, the port of Jaffa was shut down by a general strike, which was proclaimed by the Arab Higher Committee. Dizengoff pressured the government to give him permission to open a port in his new city of Tel Aviv, and before his death he managed to dedicate the first pier of Tel Aviv's new port. His dedication began with the words: "Ladies and gentlemen, I can still remember the day when Tel Aviv had no port".

== Dizengoff House / Independence Hall ==
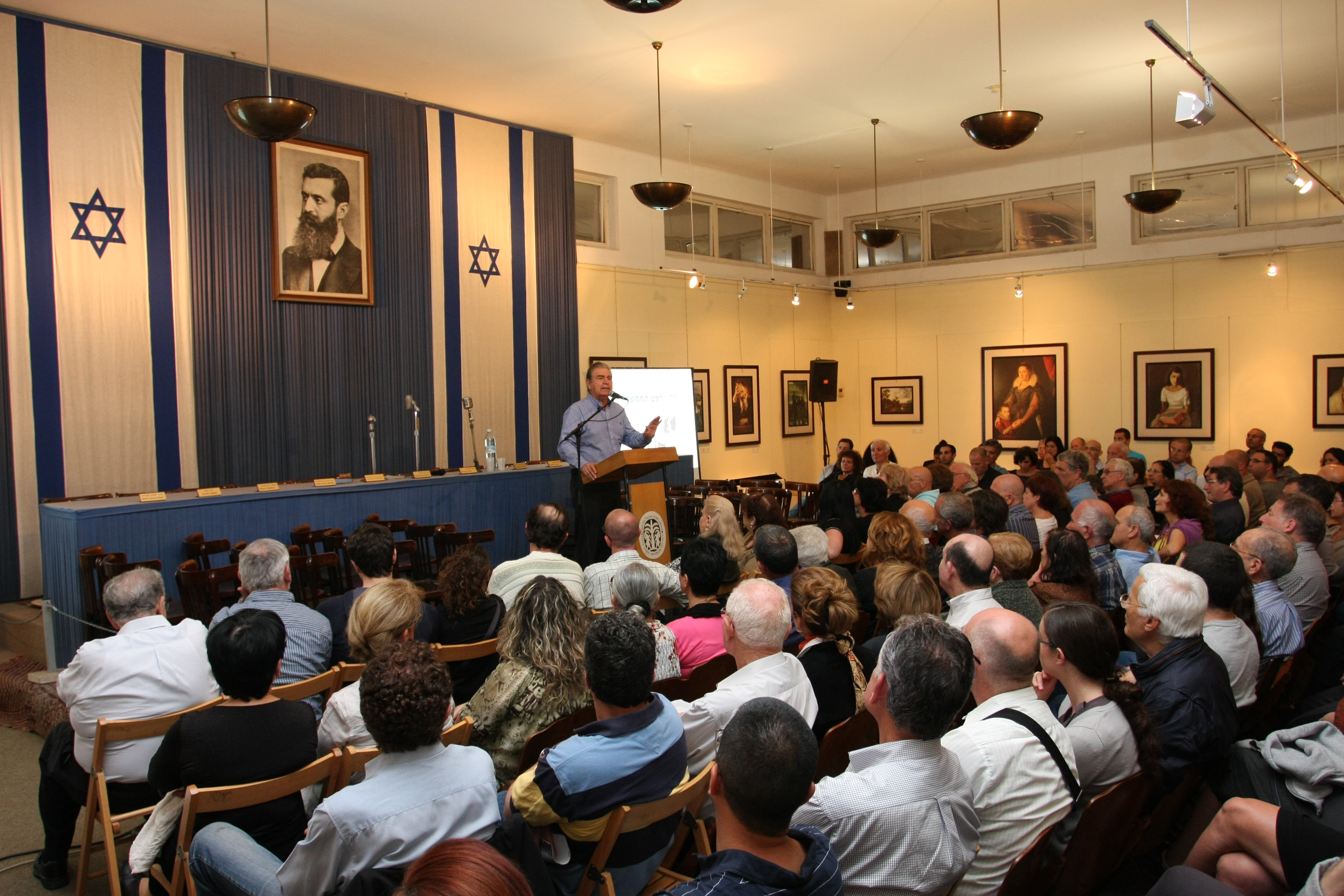
Interior of Dizengoff house, now Independence Hall, where Ben Gurion declared Israeli independence on 14 May 1948

In 1930, after the death of his wife, Dizengoff donated his house to his beloved city of Tel Aviv and requested that it be turned into a museum. The house underwent extensive renovations and became the Tel Aviv Museum of Art in 1932. The museum moved to its current location in 1971. On 14 May 1948, David Ben-Gurion declared the independence of the State of Israel at the Dizengoff residence. The building is now a history museum and known as Independence Hall.

There is a monument at Dizengoff House (Independence Hall) honoring both the 66 original families of Tel Aviv as well as a statue of Dizengoff riding his famous horse.

== Death ==
Dizengoff died on September 23, 1936. He is buried in the Trumpeldor Cemetery in Tel Aviv.

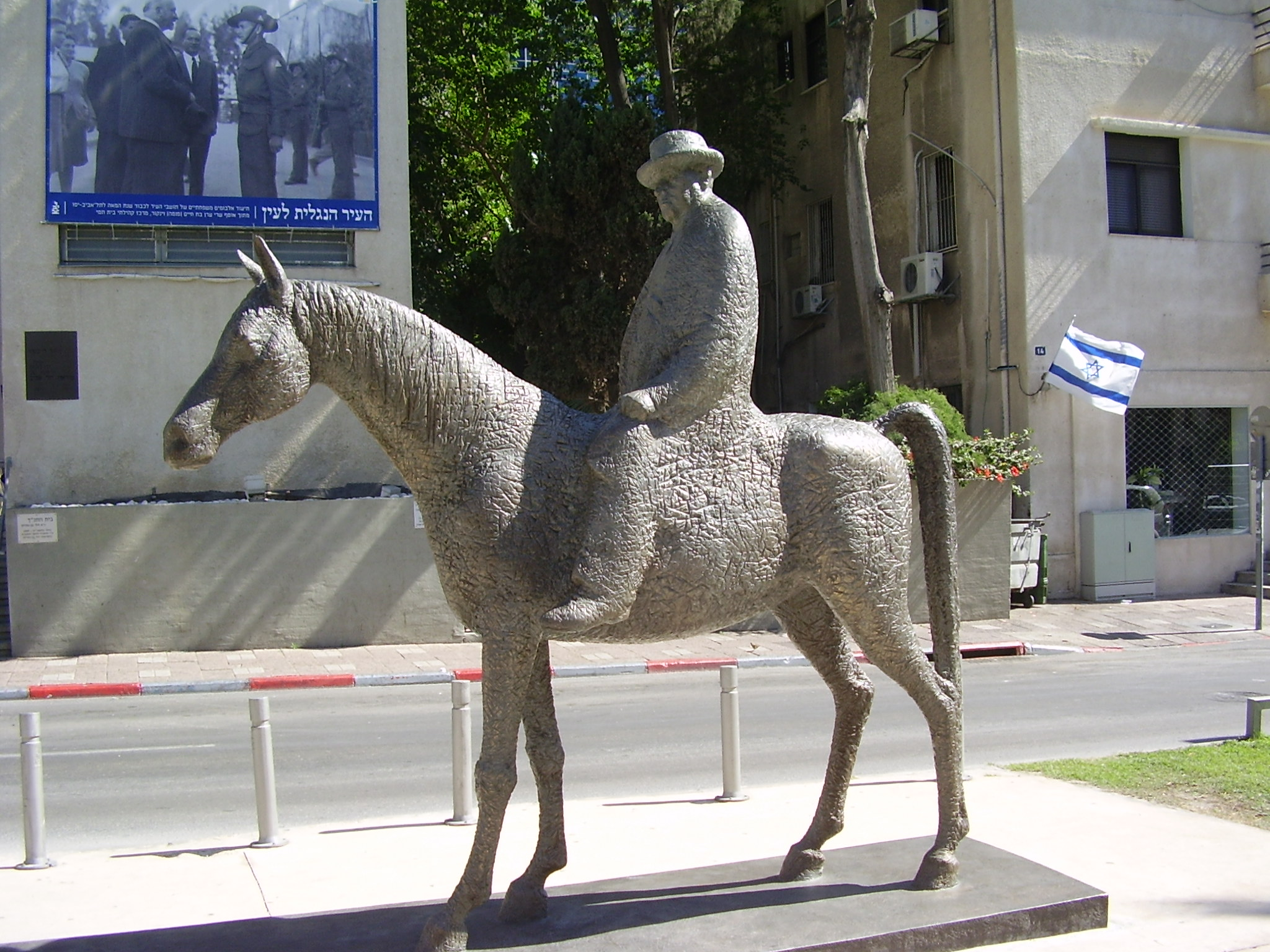
A statue of Meir Dizengoff riding his horse, located on Rothschild Boulevard, Tel Aviv

== Commemoration ==
Meir Park and Dizengoff Street are named after him. Dizengoff Square, featuring a sculpture by Yaacov Agam, is named after his wife, Zina.

The Dizengoff prize, awarded since 1937 annually by the municipality of Tel Aviv was named after him.
