= Nicolae Checerul Cuș =

Moldovan politician (1873–1946)

Nicolae Checerul (Cecherul) Cuş

Member of the Moldovan Parliament
- In office March 25, 1918 – November 27, 1918

Member of the Senate of Romania
- In office 1932–1933

Personal details
- Born: 1873 Stodolna Izvoarele
- Died: October 21, 1946 (aged 72–73) Câmpulung-Muscel
- Party: National Peasants' Party

Nicolae Checerul (Cekerul ) Cuş (born 1873 Chișinău – November 21, 1946 Câmpulung Muscel) was a Bessarabian lawyer and politician.

== Biography ==
Nicolae Cekerul Cuş was the son of Michael Cekerul-Cuş. Nicolae Cus, jurist, attorney, student of the great economics professor I. Ciuprov (1874-1926) from Moscow, studied many specialized problems, statistics, etc. Leaving the advocacy he professed in St. Petersburg, Nicholae settled in his native village, Stodolna. He served as Member of the Moldovan Parliament, mandate validated from March 25, 1918 until November 27, 1918. He joined the peasant faction, but for unknown reasons he did not participate in the March 27, 1918 vote. After the Great Union, he was a member of the National Peasants' Party, Senator of Orhei (1932-1933).

On June 28, 1940, he fled to România, but after a year he returned to Bessarabia. In 1944, he finally fled to România, settling in Câmpulung Muscel. Nicholae Cekerul Cuş was married twice, his first wife graduated from the Faculty of Philosophy in Switzerland. She had no children. He died at Câmpulung-Muscel on November 21, 1946.
