= Flag of Moldova =

Republic of Moldova
- Use: National flag and ensign
- Proportion: 1:2
- Adopted: 6 November 1990 (original design); 26 November 2010 (colors standardized)
- Design: A vertical tricolour of blue, yellow and red; charged with the coat of arms centered on the yellow band.
- Designed by: Gheorghe Vrabie

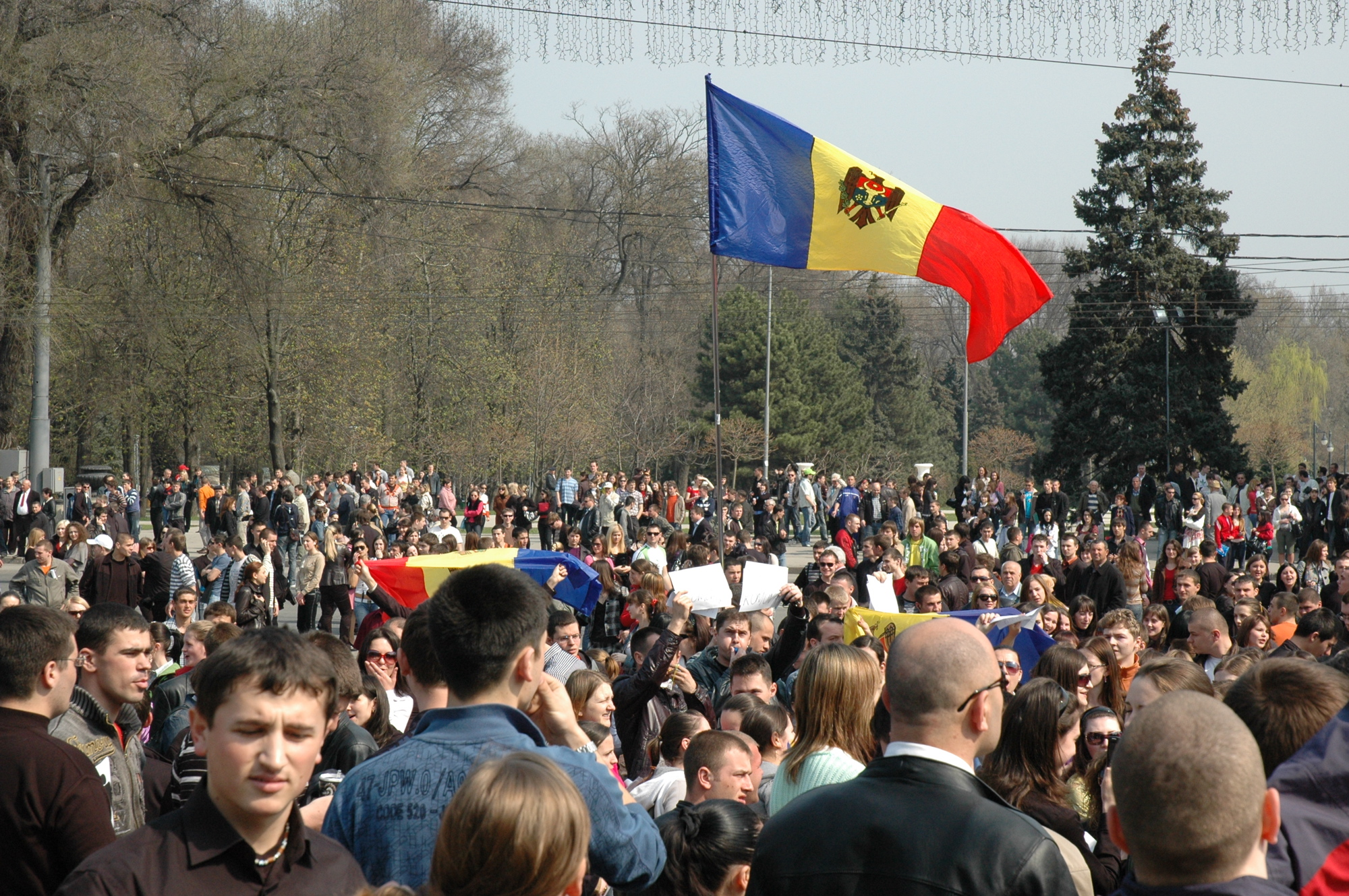
Moldovan flag at the centre of a crowd during the April 2009 Moldovan parliamentary election protests

The national flag of the Republic of Moldova (Romanian: drapelul național al Republicii Moldova) is a vertical triband of blue, yellow, and red, charged with the coat of arms of Moldova (an eagle bearing a shield charged with an aurochs) on the centre bar. The reverse is mirrored. The flag ratio is 1:2. Until further provisions, the State Flag of Moldova is used as the national flag and ensign as well; that is, civil, state and war flag and ensign.

The blue-yellow-red tricolour of Moldova is based on the flag of Romania, reflecting the two countries' national and cultural affinity. On Moldova's flag, the yellow stripe is charged with the national arms. Like the Romanian coat of arms, the Moldovan arms, adopted in 1990, features a dark golden eagle holding an Orthodox Christian cross in its beak. Instead of a sword, the eagle is holding an olive branch, symbolising peace. The blue and red shield on the eagle's chest is charged with the traditional symbols of Moldova: an aurochs' head, flanked by a rose in dexter and a crescent in sinister and having a star between its horns, all of gold.

== Colors ==
1:2 Obverse

1:2 Reverse

Construction sheet

Until 2010, the color shades of the Moldavian flag were not explicitly named. The Regulation regarding the flag stated that the colors of the flag must match the ones shown in the annex. Moldavian heraldist and vexillologist Silviu Andrieș-Tabac stated in an interview that in 1990, when the flag was being created, "it was taken into account that many countries have similar tricolor flags. As a result, it was decided to abandon the ultramarine blue, which is present on the Romanian flag, in favor of the emerald-blue, used on the mural paintings of Voroneț monastery...".

The French Album des pavillons nationaux et des marques distinctives (2000) by Armand du Payrat and Daniel Roudaut had suggested the following Pantone nuances, including those of the coat of arms: blue 549, yellow 143, red 186, green 340 and brown 464.

However, a new law from 2010 defined the colors of the flag as Berlin blue, chrome yellow and vermillon red. The exact matches, according to annex no. 2, are as follows:

Color space	Blue	Yellow	Red	Brown	Green
Pantone	293c	109c	186c	4645c	3415c
CMYK	97.81.0.0	1.15.100.0	13.100.90.4	0.28.48.30	100.26.86.14
RGB	0-70-174	255-210-0	204-9-47	176-126-91	0-122-80
HTML	#0046AE	#FFD200	#CC092F	#B07E5B	#007A50

== Governmental flags ==
=== Governmental standards ===
In 2010 four new governmental standards, derived from the state flag, were established. The standard of the minister of defense has yet to be defined, its temporary replacement being the state flag. The other three standards, of the president, president of the Parliament and prime minister, are described as follows:

A square flag with the coat of arms of Moldova on center, whose aquila is golden (instead of dark gold, or brown). The flag has a border of squares, each one measuring 1/9 of the flag's width and following the pattern blue-yellow-red-yellow. The background of the flag is purple for the president, red for the president of the Parliament and blue for the prime minister.

The original flags are kept in their respective offices. Duplicates are hoisted on the official residences when the people entitled to them are inside; also on their respective cars.

The design of the standard of the minister of defense and regulations concerning its use is also provided for by Decree No. 1194 of 17 June 2014.

1:1 Flag of the president

1:1 Flag of the president of the Parliament

1:1 Flag of the prime minister

=== Other governmental flags ===
Several governmental organizations have flags established by parliamentary or governmental decisions:

- The Department of Civil Defense and Exceptional Situations of Moldova
- The Customs of Moldova
- The Border Guard of Moldova
- The Information and Security Service of Moldova
- Principal State Inspectorate for Technical Supervising of Dangerous Industrial Objects
2:3 Department of Civil Defense and Exceptional Situations

2:3 Customs flag

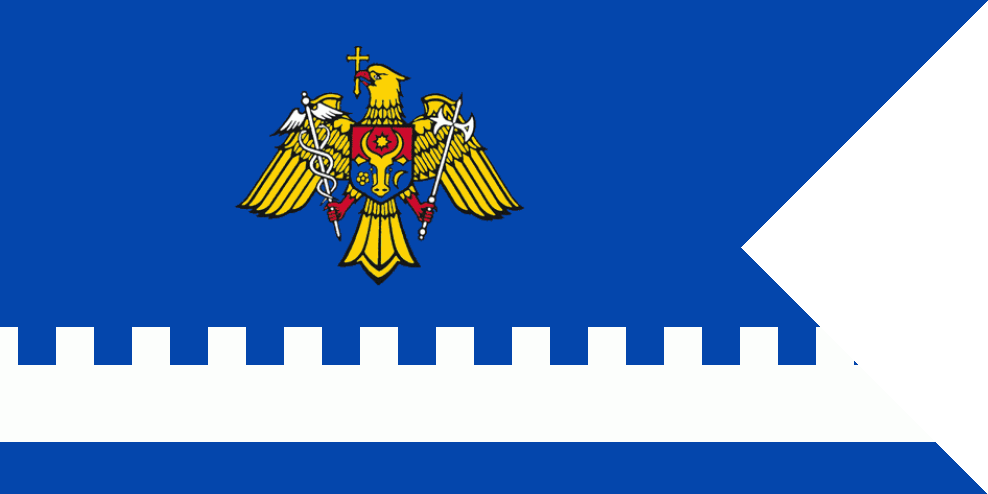
1:2 Customs ensign

2:3? Border Guard

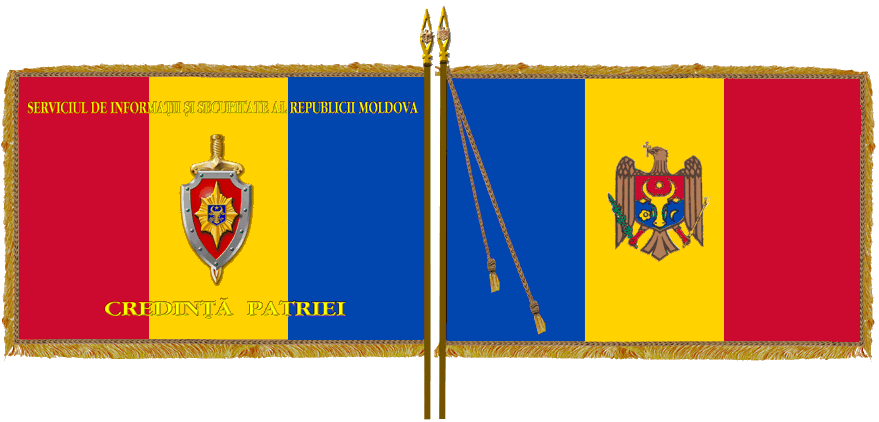
2:3 Information and Security Service

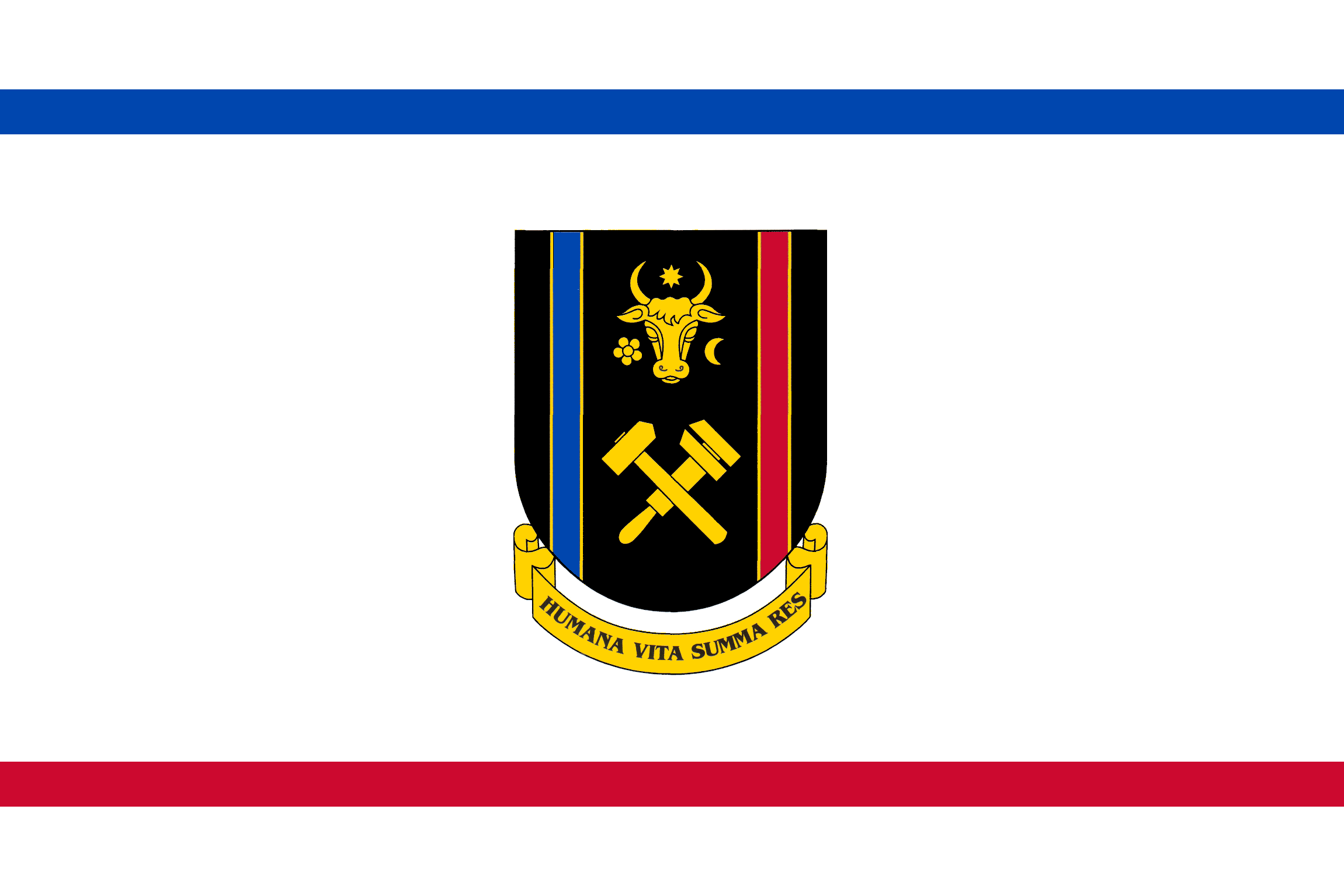
1:2 Principal State Inspectorate for Technical Supervising of Dangerous Industrial Objects

== Military flags ==
Armed Forces of Moldova
- Use: War flag
- Proportion: 2:3
- Adopted: 28 March 1991 (?)
- Design: A blue cloth, bearing a red cross within a larger yellow cross. On the front of the cloth, in the center, lies the Emblem of the National Army. The reverse of the flag has the chromatic layout and features in the center the army motto in golden letters: Romanian: "Pentru Onoare! Pentru Patrie! Pentru Tricolor!" (For Honour! For Country! For the Tricolour!)

The flag of the National Army of the Republic of Moldova represents a unique military vexillologic insignia. It is the symbol of the military glory, of the tradition and continuity, honor and loyalty of the soldiers and officers to the country.

The cloth of the flag has the same chromatics as the state flag of the Republic of Moldova. Its partition reminds of the old Moldavian military flags, from 1834 to 1863. The red central cross reminds of Saint George, the patron and protector of the medieval Moldavian army. The motto "Pentru Onoare! Pentru Patrie! Pentru Tricolor!" represents the belief of the Moldovan soldiers.

The military colours of the Moldavian Army units consists of the state flag, measuring 825×1650 mm, with golden fringes and tassels, having the unit's battle cry inscribed on obverse, above the coat of arms, and the unit's name on reverse, below the coat of arms. The flag is fixed on a wooden rod, measuring 2500 mm, with a standard pole on top. Previous regulation, which hasn't been explicitly repealed in 2010, described the inscriptions on the flag as follows: on obverse, above the coat of arms, "PENTRU PATRIA NOASTRĂ" (For our Fatherland), and below "REPUBLICA MOLDOVA" (Republic of Moldova); on reverse, above the coat of arms, the unit's name.

The military colours, as well as their regulations, are issued by decree of the president of Moldova.

The military colours of the units of the Ministry of Internal Affairs are reproducing the state flag, with golden fringes and tassels, having the motto "PENTRU PATRIE" (For Fatherland) inscribed on obverse, above the coat of arms, and the text "MINISTERUL AFACERILOR INTERNE AL REPUBLICII MOLDOVA" (The Ministry of Internal Affairs of the Republic of Moldova) on reverse, below the top margin. Also, on reverse, above the coat of arms, is inscribed the name of the unit, all letters being embroidered with golden thread.

== Flag Day ==
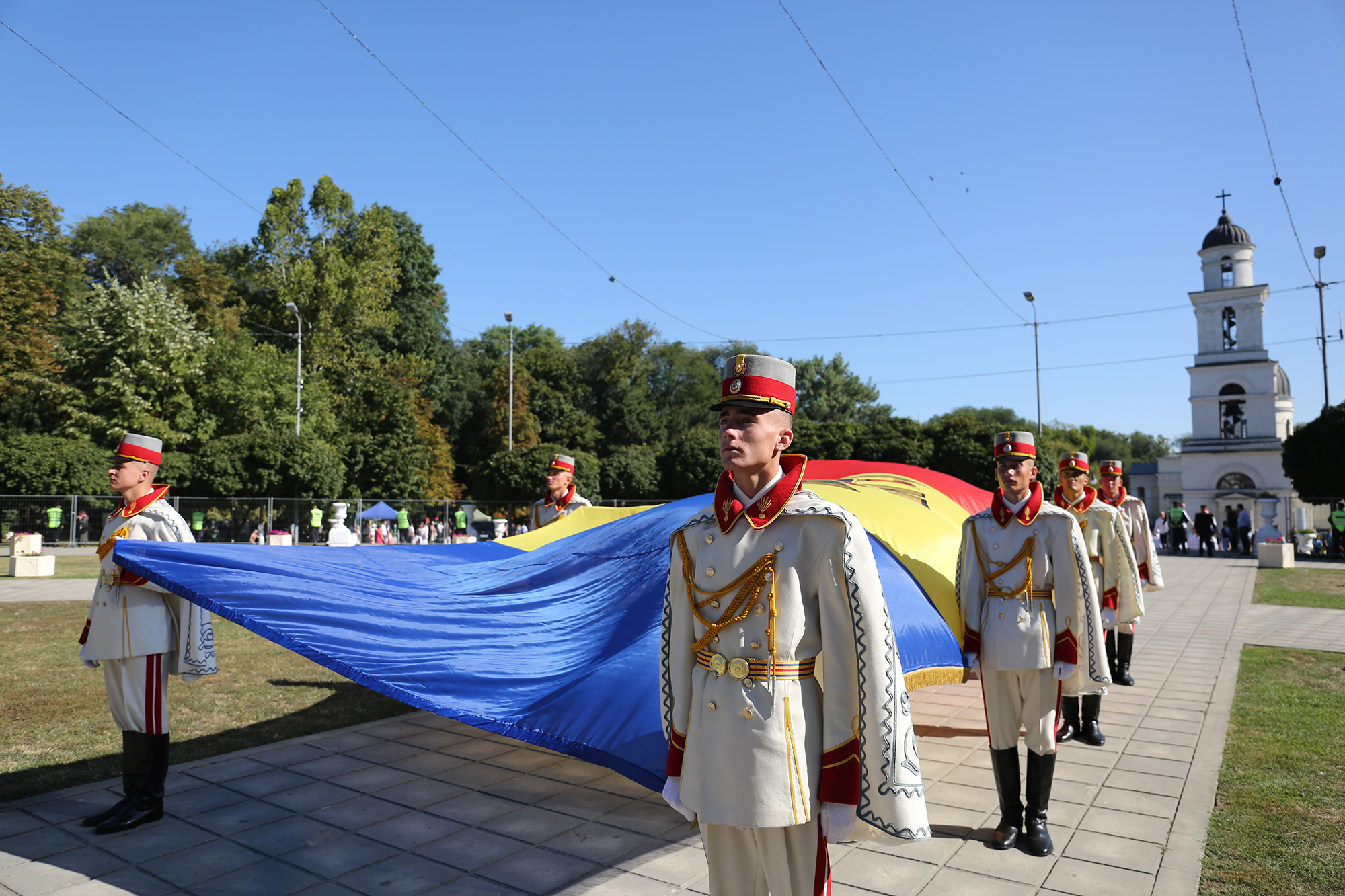
Members of the Honor Guard Company of the Moldovan National Army holding a large Flag of Moldova in 2016.

Since April 2010, the Flag Day of Moldova is celebrated on 27 April each year. On this day in 1990, the tricolor was officially adopted by the Supreme Soviet of the Moldavian SSR as the state flag of the country.

== History ==
Flag of Moldavia (14th–15th cent.)

flag of Moldavia (1831–1862)

State flag of the Moldavian Democratic Republic

Banner of the Moldavian Congress (Sfatul Țării), 1917–1918

Banner of the Moldavian Democratic Republic, 1917–1918

Flag of the Moldavian ASSR, 1938

Flag of the Moldavian SSR, 1952–1990 (readopted as the state flag of Transnistria)

Flag of the Moldavian SSR, 1990 (early prototype)

Flag of the Moldavian SSR / SSR Moldova, April 1990 - November 1990 (without emblem)

1:2 The obverse of the flag of Moldova from 1990 until 2010

1:2 The reverse of the flag of Moldova from 1990 until 2010

The obverse of the flag of Moldova from 2010 until today

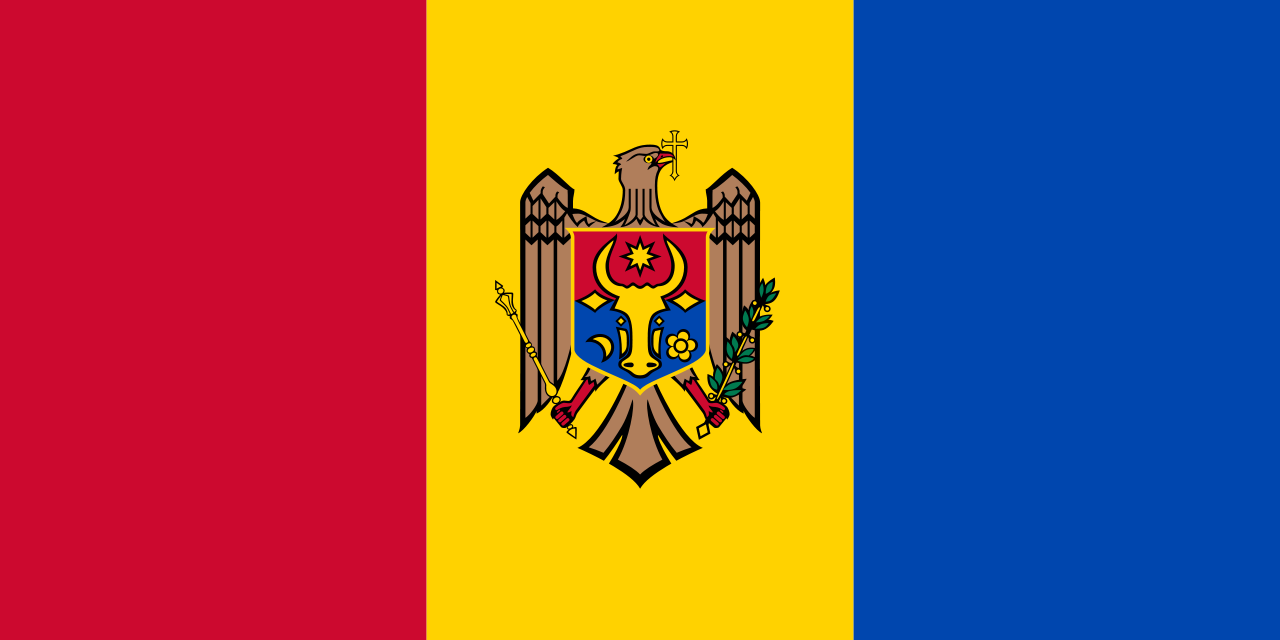
The reverse of the flag of Moldova from 2010 until today

Proposed flag by historian Vladislav Grosul in the name of reunification of the country (1997)

Proposed flag by the Russophile, anti-Unionist Party of Communists of Moldova in order to replace the current flag, similar to the flag and coat of arms of the Duchy of Bukovina (2010)

Proposed flag by the Greater Moldovan irredentist Sveatoslav Mazur (2017)

Proposed flag by Andrey Nesteryuk (2017)

Proposed new flag for Moldova by former president Igor Dodon (2018)

The current flag of Moldova was created in 1990 and is based on the national colors of Romanians, the blue-yellow-red tricolor. The reverse side differed from the Romanian flag in proportion, and by having a lighter blue.

The flag of Moldova was one of the national flags with differing obverse and reverse sides — the others being the flags of Paraguay. Although the reverse of the flag was officially stated as not containing any coat of arms, Moldovan flags with a coat of arms printed on the reverse were also used.

On 26 November 2010, a new law regarding the State Flag of Moldova became effective. One of the most important provisions has the reverse defined as a mirrored image of the obverse.

The flags of the Moldavian Democratic Republic (MDR) and some of the proposed flags for the Republic of Moldova display the head of an aurochs, which is derived from the flag and coat of arms of Moldavia.

== Flags of subdivisions ==
=== Autonomous Territorial Units ===
Flag of Gagauzia

=== Districts ===
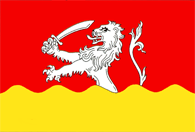
Anenii Noi District

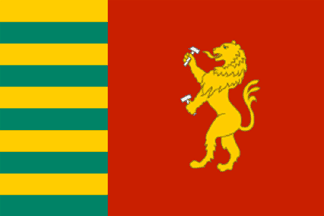
Basarabeasca District

Cahul District

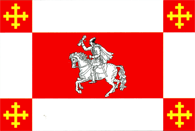
Călărași District

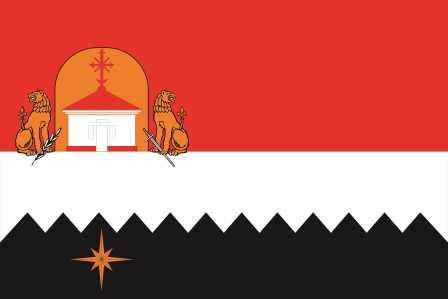
Căușeni District

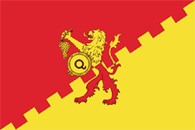
Cimișlia District

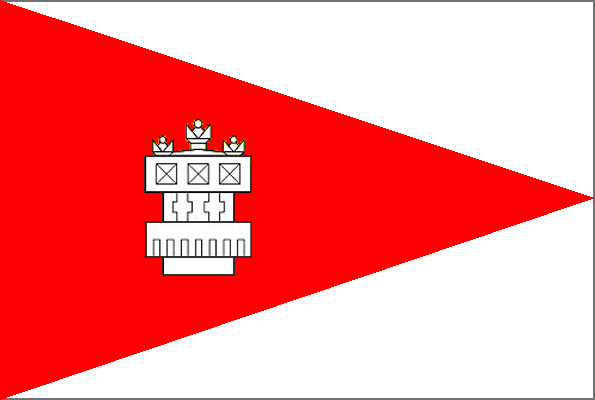
Criuleni District

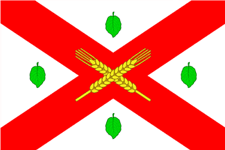
Dondușeni District

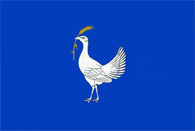
Drochia District

Dubăsari District

Edineț District

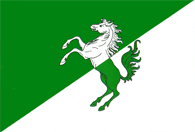
Fălești District

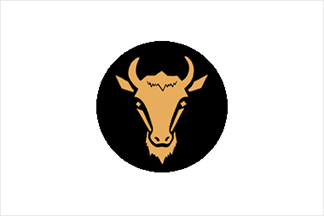
Glodeni District

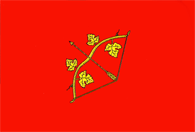
Hîncești District

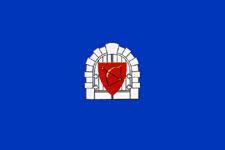
Ialoveni District

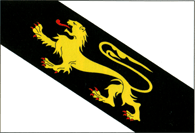
Leova District

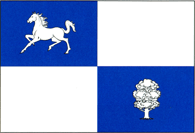
Nisporeni District

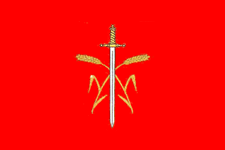
Ocnita District

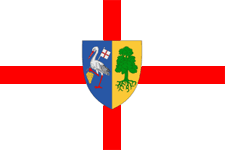
Orhei District

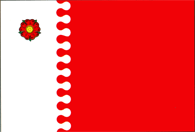
Rîșcani District

Rezina District

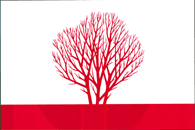
Singerei District

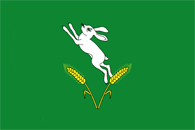
Soldanesti District

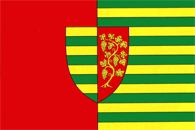
Ștefan Vodă District

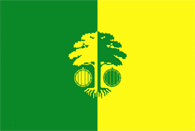
Straseni District

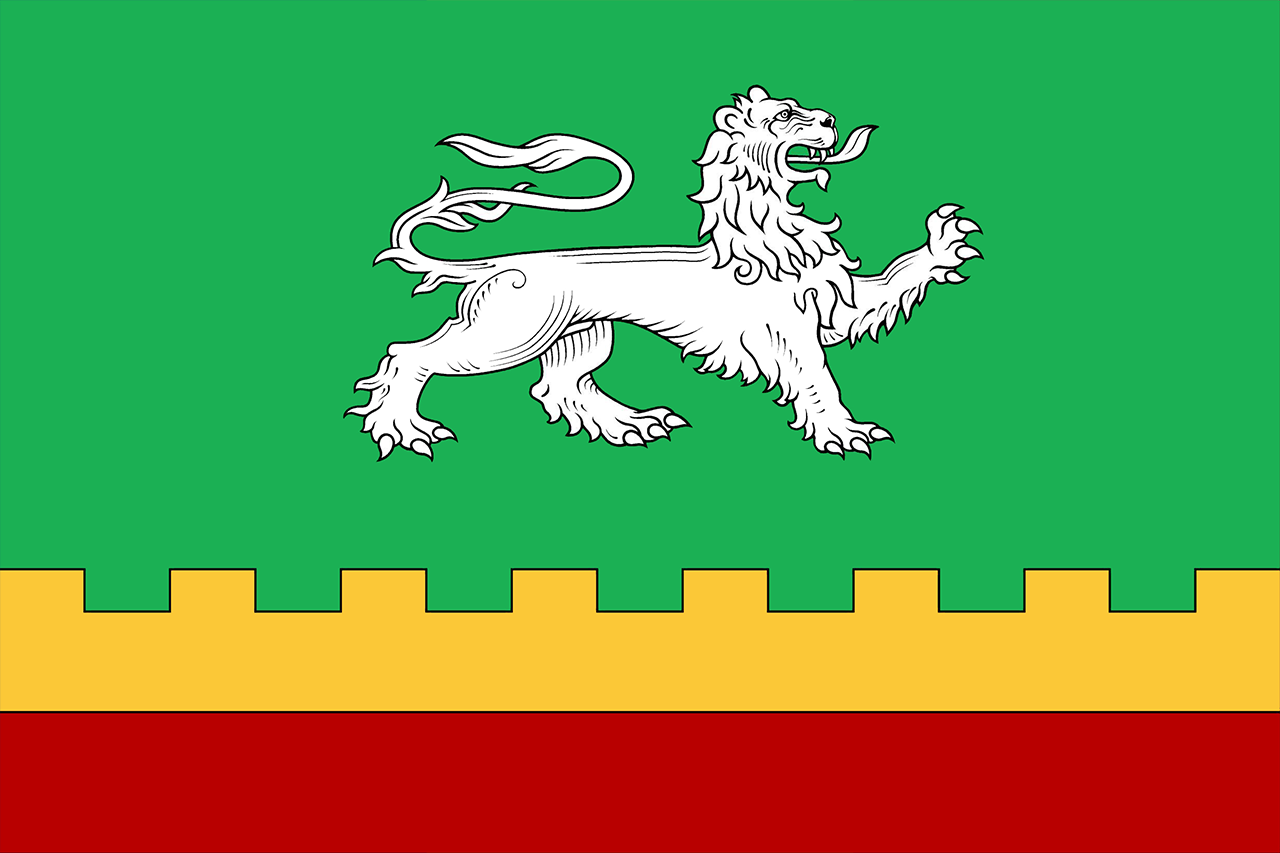
Taraclia District

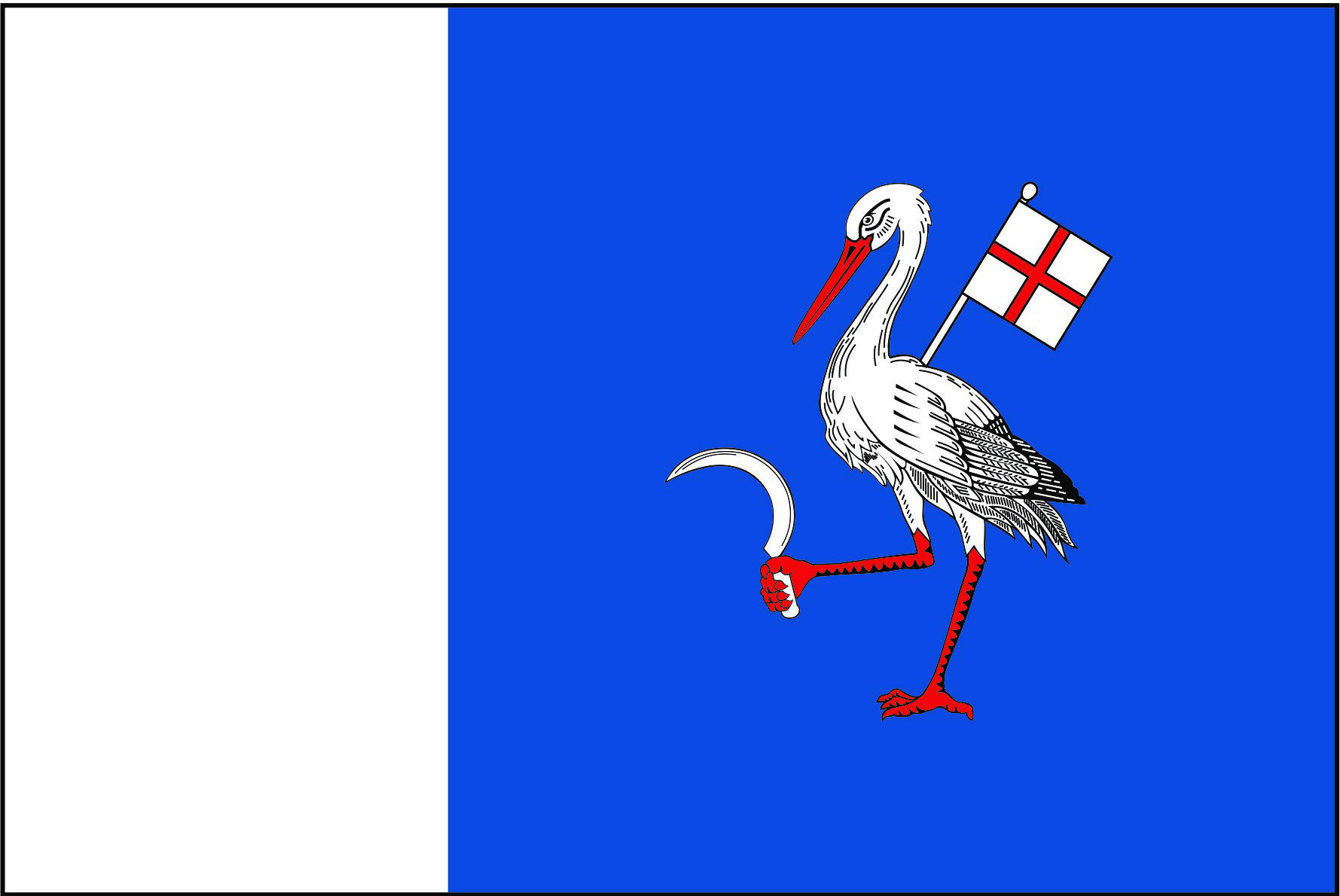
Telenesti District

Ungheni District

=== Former counties ===
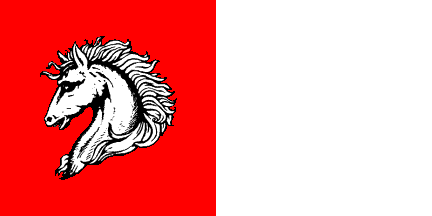
Bălți County

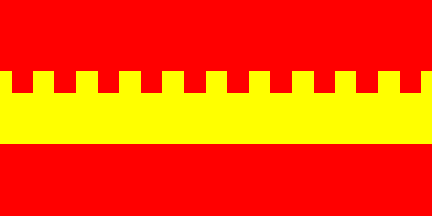
Cahul County

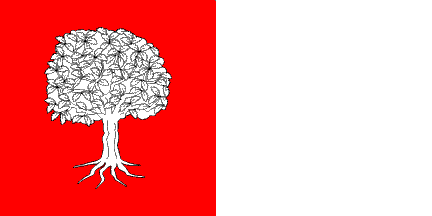
Chișinău County

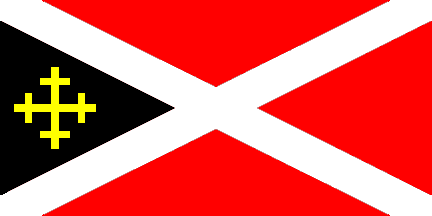
Edineț County

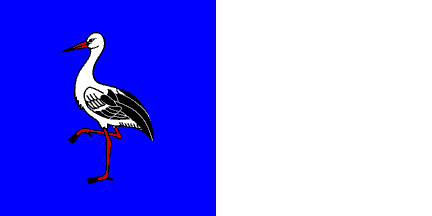
Lăpușna County

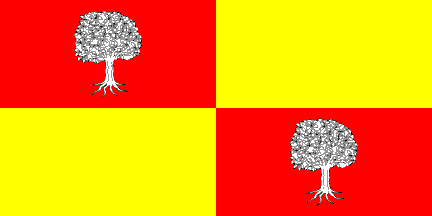
Orhei County

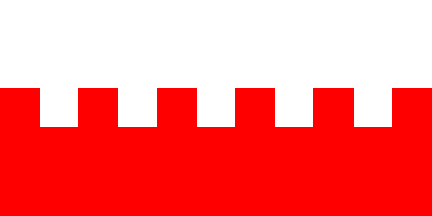
Soroca County

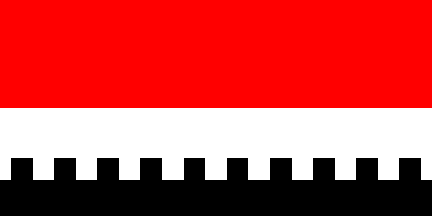
Tighina County

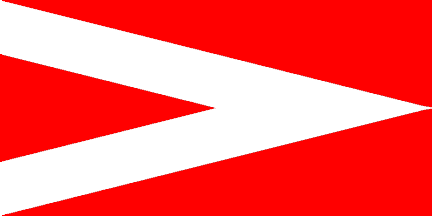
Ungheni County

== See also ==
- Coat of arms of Moldova
- Flag of the Moldavian Soviet Socialist Republic
- Flags whose reverse differs from the obverse
- List of Moldovan flags
- Flag of Transnistria
