= ISO 3166-2:MD =

Entry for Moldova in ISO 3166-2

ISO 3166-2:MD is the entry for Moldova in ISO 3166-2, part of the ISO 3166 standard published by the International Organization for Standardization (ISO), which defines codes for the names of the principal subdivisions (e.g., provinces or states) of all countries coded in ISO 3166-1.

Currently for Moldova, ISO 3166-2 codes are defined for one autonomous territorial unit, three cities, 32 districts and one territorial unit. The three cities have special status equal to the districts.

Each code consists of two parts separated by a hyphen. The first part is MD, the ISO 3166-1 alpha-2 code of Moldova. The second part is two letters.

Due to limited international recognition, Transnistria is considered part of Moldova and does not have its own ISO 3166-1 code.

== Current codes ==
Subdivision names are listed as in the ISO 3166-2 standard published by the ISO 3166 Maintenance Agency (ISO 3166/MA).

Subdivision names are sorted in Romanian alphabetical order: a, ă, â, b-i, î, j-s, ș, t, ț, u-z.

Click on the button in the header to sort each column.

Code	Subdivision name (ro)	Subdivision category
MD-AN	Anenii Noi	district
MD-BS	Basarabeasca	district
MD-BA	Bălți	city
MD-BD	Bender [Tighina]	city
MD-BR	Briceni	district
MD-CA	Cahul	district
MD-CT	Cantemir	district
MD-CL	Călărași	district
MD-CS	Căușeni	district
MD-CU	Chișinău	city
MD-CM	Cimișlia	district
MD-CR	Criuleni	district
MD-DO	Dondușeni	district
MD-DR	Drochia	district
MD-DU	Dubăsari	district
MD-ED	Edineț	district
MD-FA	Fălești	district
MD-FL	Florești	district
MD-GA	Găgăuzia, Unitatea teritorială autonomă (UTAG)	autonomous territorial unit
MD-GL	Glodeni	district
MD-HI	Hîncești	district
MD-IA	Ialoveni	district
MD-LE	Leova	district
MD-NI	Nisporeni	district
MD-OC	Ocnița	district
MD-OR	Orhei	district
MD-RE	Rezina	district
MD-RI	Rîșcani	district
MD-SI	Sîngerei	district
MD-SO	Soroca	district
MD-SN	Stînga Nistrului, unitatea teritorială din	territorial unit
MD-ST	Strășeni	district
MD-SD	Șoldănești	district
MD-SV	Ștefan Vodă	district
MD-TA	Taraclia	district
MD-TE	Telenești	district
MD-UN	Ungheni	district

== Changes ==
The following changes to the entry have been announced in newsletters by the ISO 3166/MA since the first publication of ISO 3166-2 in 1998. ISO stopped issuing newsletters in 2013.

Newsletter	Date issued	Description of change in newsletter	Code/Subdivision change
Newsletter I-2	2002-05-21	Completely new subdivision layout	Subdivision layout: 10 cities, 40 districts (see below) → 1 autonomous territory, 1 city, 1 territorial unit, 9 districts
Newsletter I-3	2002-08-20	Error correction: Header information on number of districts corrected	
Newsletter I-4	2002-12-10	Addition of one district. Subdivision categories in header re-sorted	Subdivisions added: MD-TA Taraclia
Newsletter II-2	2010-06-30	Consistency between ISO 3166-1 and ISO 3166-2, addition of names in administrative languages, and update of the administrative structure and of the list source	Subdivision layout: 1 autonomous territory, 1 city, 10 districts, 1 territorial unit (see below) → 1 autonomous territorial unit, 3 cities, 32 districts, 1 territorial unit

The following changes to the entry are listed on ISO's online catalogue, the Online Browsing Platform:

Effective date of change	Short description of change (en)
2015-08-04	Correction of the administrative language codes from mo, mol to ro, ron
2014-11-03	Change subdivision name of MD-BD
2010-06-30	Consistency between ISO 3166-1 and ISO 3166-2, addition of names in administrative languages, and update of the administrative structure and of the list source
2009-01-07	Change of short name
2008-09-09	Correction of administrative language from Romanian (ro, ron) to Moldavian (mo, mol)
2008-04-08	Change of short name

=== Codes before Newsletter I-2 ===
Former code	Subdivision name	Subdivision category
MD-BAL	Bălţi	city
MD-CAH	Cahul	city
MD-CHI	Chişinău	city
MD-DUB	Dubăsari	city
MD-ORH	Orhei	city
MD-RIB	Rîbnița	city
MD-SOC	Soroca	city
MD-TIG	Tighina	city
MD-TIR	Tiraspol	city
MD-UNG	Ungheni	city
MD-ANE	Anenii Noi	district
MD-BAS	Basarabeasca	district
MD-BRI	Brinceni	district
MD-CHL	Cahul	district
MD-CAM	Camenca	district
MD-CAN	Cantemir	district
MD-CAI	Căinari	district
MD-CAL	Călăraşi	district
MD-CAS	Căuşeni	district
MD-CIA	Ciadîr-Lunga	district
MD-CIM	Cimișlia	district
MD-COM	Comrat	district
MD-CRI	Criuleni	district
MD-DON	Dondușeni	district
MD-DRO	Drochia	district
MD-DBI	Dubăsari	district
MD-EDI	Edineț	district
MD-FAL	Făleşti	district
MD-FLO	Florești	district
MD-GLO	Glodeni	district
MD-GRI	Grigoriopol	district
MD-HIN	Hîncești	district
MD-IAL	Ialoveni	district
MD-LEO	Leova	district
MD-NIS	Nisporeni	district
MD-OCN	Ocnița	district
MD-OHI	Orhei	district
MD-REZ	Rezina	district
MD-RIT	Rîbnița	district
MD-RIS	Rîșcani	district
MD-SIN	Sîngerei	district
MD-SLO	Slobozia	district
MD-SOA	Soroca	district
MD-STR	Strășeni	district
MD-SOL	Şoldăneşti	district
MD-STE	Ştefan Vodă	district
MD-TAR	Taraclia	district
MD-TEL	Telenești	district
MD-UGI	Ungheni	district
MD-VUL	Vulcănești	district

=== Codes before Newsletter II-2 ===
Former code	Subdivision name	Subdivision category
MD-GA	Găgăuzia, Unitate Teritorială Autonomă (UTAG)	autonomous territory
MD-CU	Chişinău	city
MD-BA	Bălţi	district
MD-CA	Cahul	district
MD-CH	Chişinău	district
MD-ED	Edineţ	district
MD-LA	Lăpuşna	district
MD-OR	Orhei	district
MD-SO	Soroca	district
MD-TA	Taraclia	district
MD-TI	Tighina [Bender]	district
MD-UN	Ungheni	district
MD-SN	Stînga Nistrului, unitatea teritorială din	territorial unit

== See also ==
- Subdivisions of Moldova
- FIPS region codes of Moldova
- Neighbouring countries: RO, UA
