= Vehicle registration plates of Moldova =

Republic of Moldova/Republica Moldova
- Moldovan registration plate, issued from 2015
- Country: Moldova
- Country code: MD

Current series
- Size: 520 mm × 110 mm 20.5 in × 4.3 in
- Serial format: ABC 1(23)
- Colour (front): Black on white
- Colour (rear): Black on white

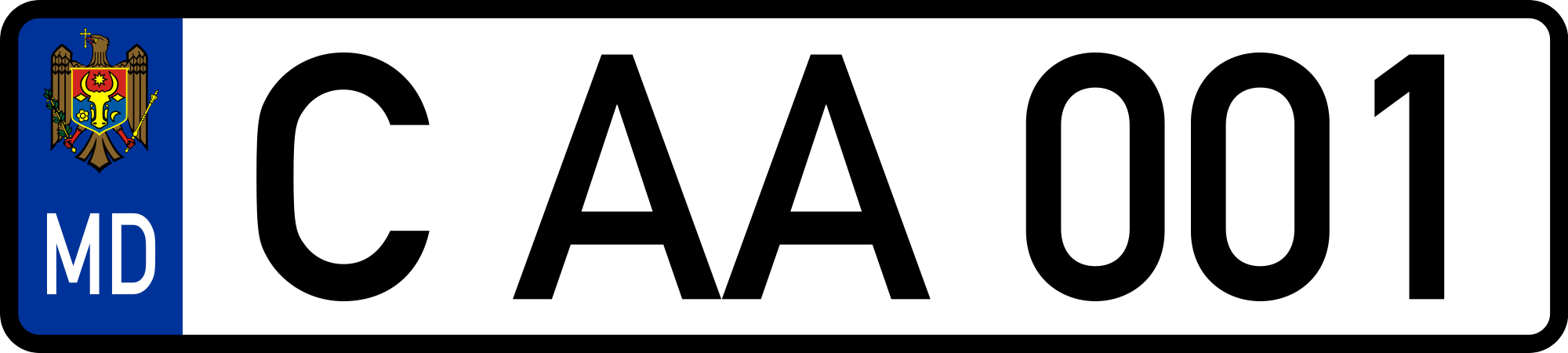
Moldovan registration plate, issued from November 2011

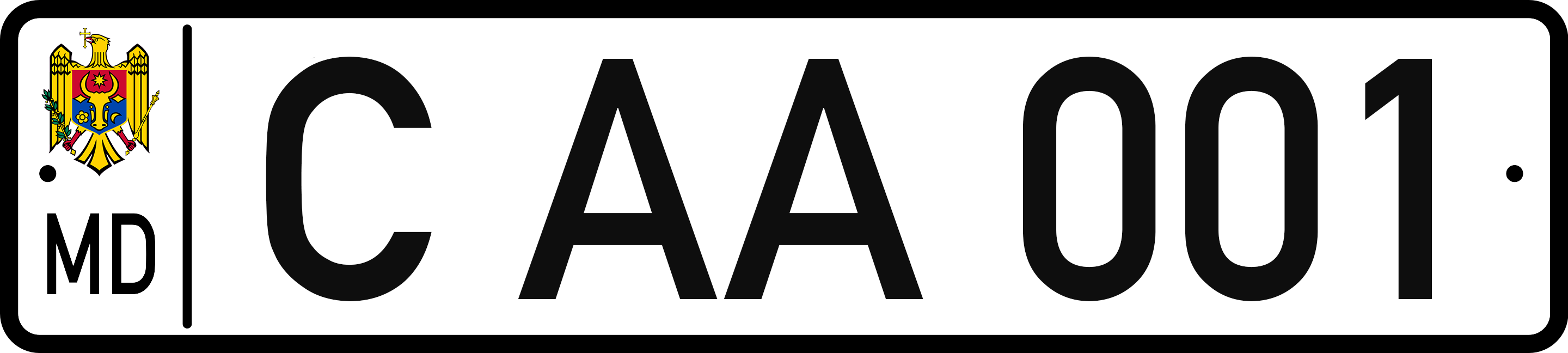
Moldovan registration plate, issued prior to November 2011

License plates in Moldova were introduced on November 30, 1992. Currently issued plates consist of six black characters on a white background: three letters and three numbers. On the left part of the plates there is a modified, wider than usual blue euroband having the Moldovan flag instead of the EU symbol and the international country code MD underneath it. The plates are 520 mm wide and 112 mm high, made of metal with embossed characters using the FE-Schrift font.

Pre-2015 plates have seven characters: two letters for the region (except for Chișinău, which only has the letters C and K), two letters for the series and three digits, all written using the DIN 1451 Mittelschrift font. The left side of the plate carries the coat of arms of Moldova with the country index MD (before 1993 the country index on car plates was MLD) and since November 1, 2011, it has a vertical blue background, similar to the European Union plates. Additionally, the owners could request to have only one or two digits instead of three.

Image	Description
	The President of the Republic of Moldova
	Government
	Parliament
	Ministries
	Armed forces
	Ministry of Internal Affairs
	Security Service
	The vehicles of foreign legal entities and foreign citizens, stateless persons, with the exception of the diplomatic corps, accredited in the Republic of Moldova
	Motor vehicles imported under customs regime of temporary admission by individuals and legal entities from the Republic of Moldova
	Vehicles deleted from the records in case of final export from the Republic of Moldova
	Vehicles of foreign citizens and stateless persons with the right of permanent residence on the territory of the Republic of Moldova
	Service cars of diplomatic missions and personal cars of diplomatic staff
	Vehicles of consular offices, consular officials, consular employees and members of the service staff of consular offices
	The vehicles of members of the technical administrative and service staff of diplomatic missions, as well as of a category of collaborators of the representative offices of international organizations

== Car designations ==
Before 2015, Moldovan vehicle registration plates started with a group of one or two letters, indicating the town or district of registration, followed by two other letters indicating the series and three digits:

Map overlay of Moldova, codes shown

Code	City or District (Notes)
AN	Anenii Noi
BE	Bender
BL	Bălți and Bălți County (1999–2003)
BR	Briceni
BS	Basarabeasca
C	Chișinău
CC	Camenca
CG	Ceadîr-Lunga (–1999, currently Gagauzia)
CH	Cahul and Cahul County (1999–2003)
CL	Călărași
CM	Cimișlia
CN	Căinari (–1999, currently merged with Căușeni)
CO	Comrat (–1999, currently Gagauzia)
CR	Criuleni
CS	Căușeni
CT	Cantemir
CU	Chișinău County (1999–2003)
DB	Dubăsari
DN	Dondușeni
DR	Drochia
ED	Edineț and Edineț County (1999–2003)
FL	Fălești
FR	Florești
GE	Gagauzia (1999–)
GL	Glodeni
GR	Grigoriopol
HN	Hîncești
IL	Ialoveni
K	Chișinău (2009–)
LP	Lăpușna County (1999–2003)
LV	Leova
NS	Nisporeni
OC	Ocnița
OR	Orhei and Orhei County (1999–2003)
RB	Rîbnița
RS	Rîșcani
RZ	Rezina
SD	Șoldănești
SG	Sîngerei
SL	Slobozia
SR	Soroca and Soroca County (1999–2003)
ST	Strășeni
SV	Ștefan Vodă
TG	Tighina County (1999–2003)
TL	Telenești
TR	Taraclia
TS	Tiraspol
UN	Ungheni and Ungheni County (1999–2003)
VL	Vulcănești (–1999, currently Gagauzia)

=== In Transnistria ===
As a result of Transnistria, a small part of eastern Moldova, not being under Moldovan control, license plates with the codes CC, GR, RB, SL, TG and TS are rarely issued. Dubăsari district, using code DB, is partially controlled by Moldova with these plates being regularly issued.
