= Administrative divisions of Moldova =

Moldova is divided administratively into two levels:

- First level:
  - 32 districts or raions (Romanian: raioane)
  - 3 municipalities (municipii)—specifically Chișinău, Bălți, and Bender
  - 2 autonomous territorial units: Gagauzia and Left Bank of the Dniester (de facto Transnistria, which is not under control of the government of Moldova)
- Second level:
  - Villages (Romanian: sate); two or more villages can form together a commune (Romanian: comună)
  - Sectors
  - 10 municipalities (municipii)
  - Cities and towns

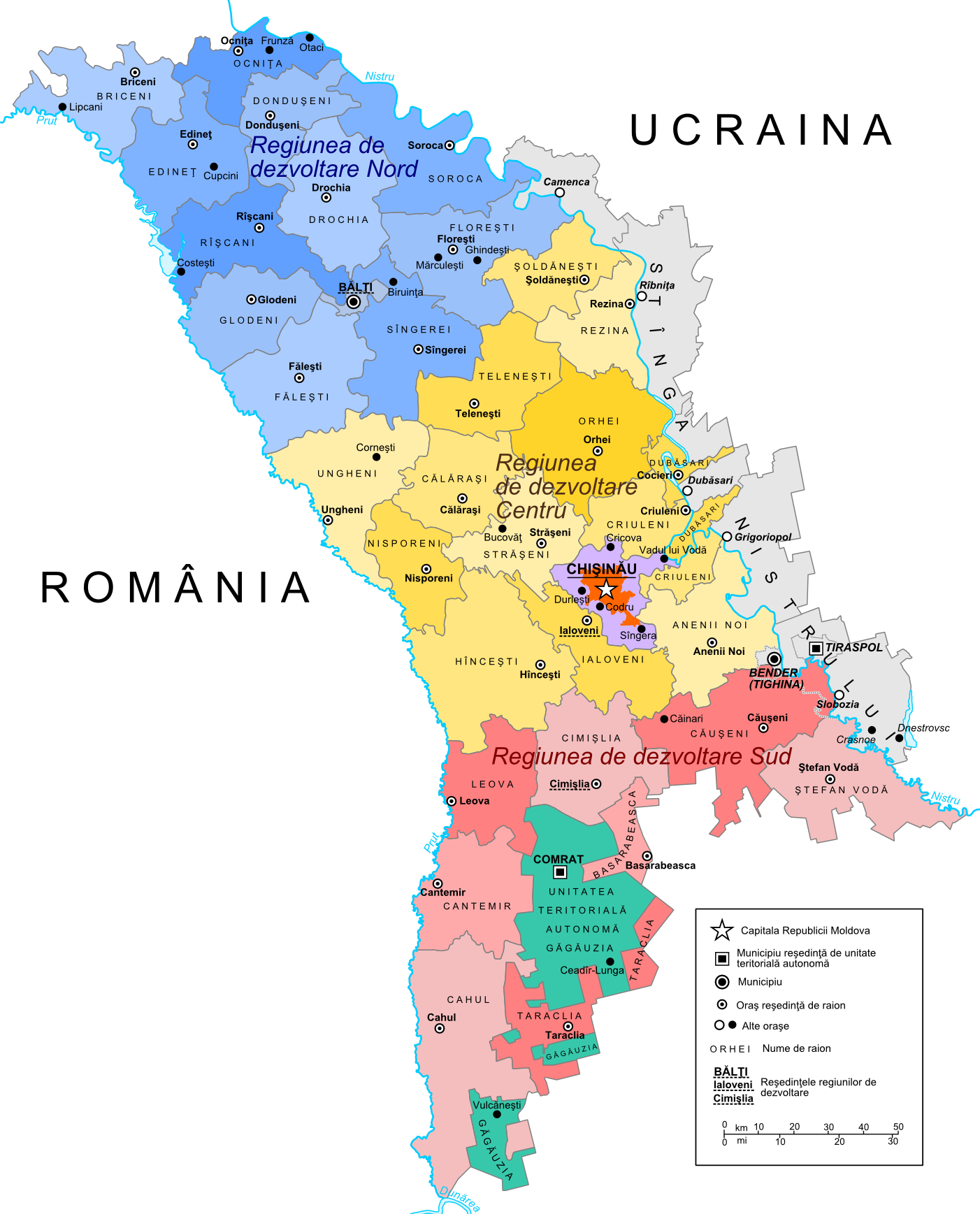
Current administrative divisions of Moldova

== Localities ==
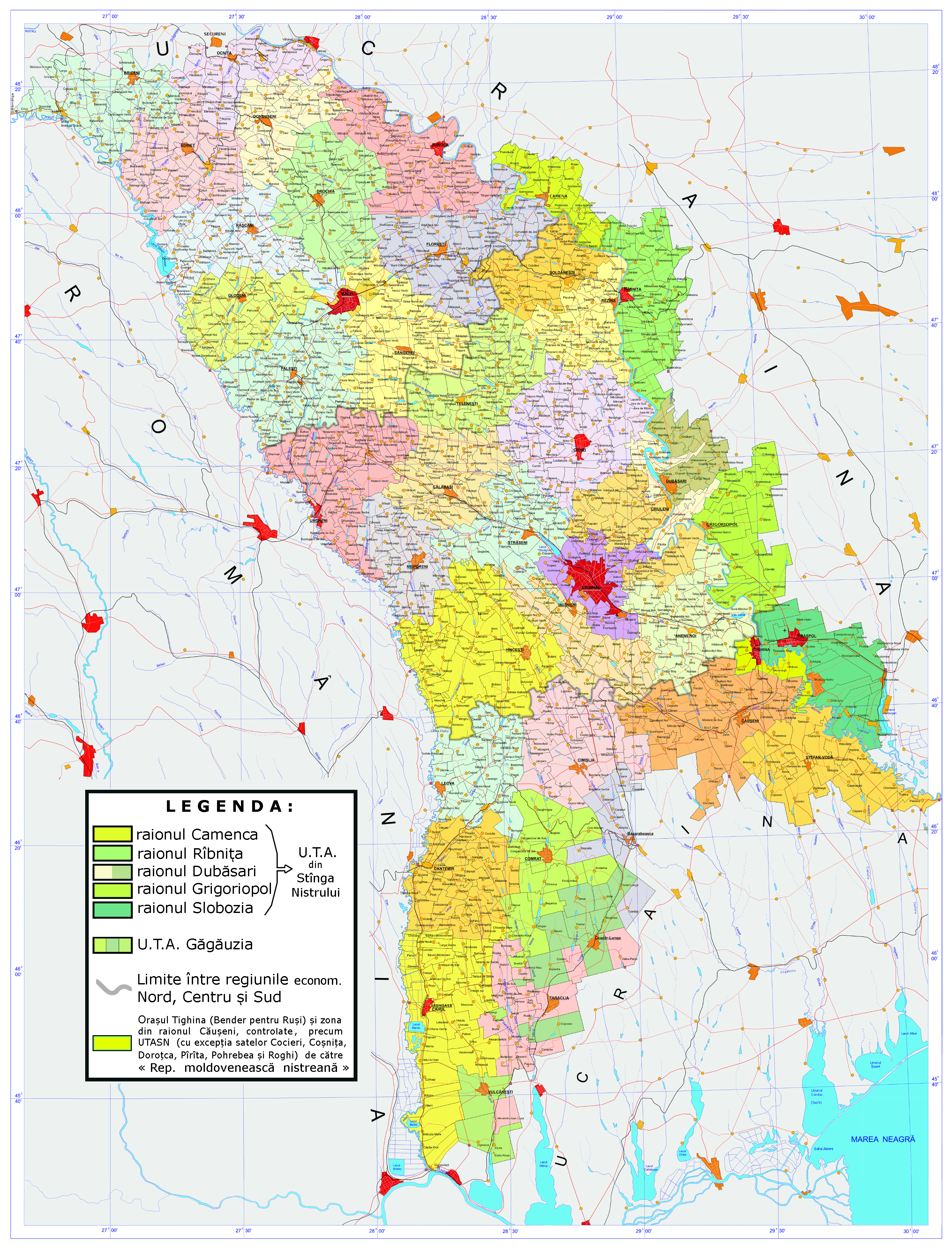
Detailed map of Moldovan administrative divisions

Moldova has a total of 1,682 localities; from these 982 are incorporated (de jure with 982 mayors and 982 local councils), including 53 cities/towns, other 13 cities with municipality status (see municipiu), and 916 rural localities. They cover the entire area of the country. A number of villages are self-governed, while others 700 villages are too small to have a separate administration, and are part of either cities/towns/municipalities (41 of them) or communes (659). Few localities are inhabited.

In April 2026, the national government proposed reforms that would merge smaller administrations together, so that no municipality would serve less than 3,000 people. Many voluntarily merged over the succeeding months, and there are contested plans to merge more.

== Current divisions ==
In the administrative-territorial structure of Moldova are 898 second-level administrative territorial units (cities/towns, sectors and villages/communes).

The status of Chișinău, Bălți, and Tighina as municipalities and first-level territorial units of the country allows their suburb villages to have, when large enough, their own mayor and local council. By contrast, the villages that are administratively part of (some of) the other cities do not retain self-rule.

- Districts (32):

Name of district	District seat	President	Area (km^{2})	Population (2024)	Density (2024)	Towns/ villages
Anenii Noi	Anenii Noi	Vladimir Vâzdoagă	887.6	57,687	65.0	45
Basarabeasca	Basarabeasca	Natalia Cara	294.5	14,914	50.6	10
Briceni	Briceni	Efimia Bendulac	814.4	46,894	57.6	39
Cahul	Cahul	Avram Micinschi	1,545.3	72,775	47.1	55
Cantemir	Cantemir	Ion Balan	868.7	33,181	38.2	51
Călărași	Călărași	Ilie Rău	753.5	43,864	58.2	44
Căușeni	Căușeni	Ilie Gluh	1,185.2	57,261	48.3	48
Cimișlia	Cimișlia	Ion Veveriță	923.7	30,986	33.5	39
Criuleni	Criuleni	Vitalie Rotaru	687.9	52,926	76.9	43
Dondușeni	Dondușeni	Anastasie Pavlov	644.1	28,108	43.6	30
Drochia	Drochia	Andrei Marian	999.9	53,738	53.7	40
Dubăsari	Cocieri	Grigore Policinschi	309.2	21,781	70.4	15
Edineț	Edineț	Oleg Scutaru	932.9	50,429	54.1	49
Fălești	Fălești	Valeriu Muduc	1,072.6	56,039	52.2	76
Florești	Florești	Ștefan Paniș	1,108.2	53,264	48.1	74
Glodeni	Glodeni	Valeriu Țarigradschi	754.2	35,829	47.5	35
Hîncești	Hîncești	Grigore Cobzac	1,472.1	69,462	47.2	63
Ialoveni	Ialoveni	Nicolae Andronache	783.5	74,458	95.0	34
Leova	Leova	Efrosinia Grețu	764.6	28,835	37.7	40
Nisporeni	Nisporeni	Vasile Bîtcă	629.0	36,413	57.9	39
Ocnița	Ocnița	Ion Tomai	598.7	31,610	52.8	33
Orhei	Orhei	Ion Ștefârță	1,228.3	79,242	64.5	75
Rezina	Rezina	Eleonora Graur	621.8	30,243	48.6	41
Rîșcani	Rîșcani	Ion Parea	936.0	43,652	46.6	55
Sîngerei	Sîngerei	Gheorghe Meaun	1,033.7	55,933	54.1	70
Soroca	Soroca	Veaceslav Rusnac	1,040.4	58,609	56.3	68
Strășeni	Strășeni	Petru Voloșciuc	729.1	61,362	84.2	39
Șoldănești	Șoldănești	Alexandru Relițchi	598.4	25,394	42.4	33
Ștefan Vodă	Ștefan Vodă	Vasile Buzu	998	42,285	42.4	26
Taraclia	Taraclia	Vasile Plagov	673.9	26,435	39.2	26
Telenești	Telenești	Boris Burcă	848.6	41,452	48.8	54
Ungheni	Ungheni	Iurie Toma	1,082.6	75,804	70.0	74

- District-level municipalities (3):

Municipality	Mayor	Area (km^{2})	Population (2024)	Density (2024)	Towns/ villages
Chișinău	Ion Ceban	571.6	720,128	1,259.8	35
Bălți	Alexandr Petkov	77.6	94,546	1,218.3	3
Tighina	none¹	97			2

- Autonomous territorial units (2):

Name of autonomy	Autonomy Seat	Leader	Area (km^{2})	Population (2024)	Density (2024)	Towns/ villages
Găgăuzia	Comrat	Evghenia Guțul	1,848.5	103,668	56.1	35
Left Bank of the Dniester	Tiraspol	none¹	4,163			147

¹ Tighina and the Administrative-Territorial Units of the Left Bank of the Dniester are under the control of the unrecognized separatist Pridnestrovian Moldavian Republic (PMR, also known as Transnistria). There, Tighina is known as Bender.

=== Areas not under central government control ===
- Transnistria, which with the exception of six communes (comprising a total of ten localities) corresponds to the geographic part of Moldova situated to the east of the Dniestr (Romanian: Nistru) river, is de jure a part of Moldova, but in fact is governed by breakaway authorities (see also: War of Transnistria). The city of Dubăsari (geographically and administratively in Transnistria, and not in the Dubăsari District), and six communes (administratively in the Dubăsari District of Moldova, and not in the administrative definition of Transnistria), all controlled by the central authorities (except the village of Roghi in commune Molovata Nouă, which is controlled by Tiraspol), form the northern part of the security zone set at the end of the war.
- Tighina municipality (the city itself, plus the commune Proteagailovca), and three communes (five localities) of Căușeni District (Gîsca, Chițcani, and Cremenciug) are de facto controlled by the breakaway regime of Transnistria. Together with the commune Varnița of Anenii Noi District and the commune Copanca of Căușeni District under Moldovan control, these localities form the southern part of the security zone set at the end of the war. The city of Tighina has both a Moldovan police force (mostly symbolic) and a Transnistrian militsiya force (practically in charge in most instances). In Transnistria, Tighina is known as Bender.

=== Population ===
- The smallest entity electing a mayor is the commune of Salcia, in Taraclia District (population 182 in 2024).
- The largest entity is the municipality of Chișinău, electing a mayor for 720,128 inhabitants; the city of Chisinau itself has 567,038 inhabitants.
- As of 2025, Moldova has 893 level 1 local governments (UAT 1) following two voluntary amalgamations during 2025.

=== Duplicate names ===
There are 147 settlement names shared by multiple localities in Moldova. Most notable cases includes these:

- A town Mărculești, and a different commune Mărculești, both situated in the Florești District
- A city Dondușeni, and a different commune Dondușeni, both situated in the Dondușeni District
- A city Drochia, and a different commune Drochia, both situated in the Drochia District
- A town Costești, in Rîșcani District, with a population of 2,247 (4,109 with 4 suburb villages), the 8th smallest city in Moldova, and a commune (village) Costești, in Ialoveni District, population 11,128, the 2nd largest village in Moldova
- A town Cornești, in Ungheni District, and a different village Cornești in the same Ungheni District, and also a village Cornești in Hîncești District
- etc.

== Regions ==
The first-level units are grouped into three regions:

Northern Development Region

1. Bălți Municipality
2. Briceni
3. Dondușeni
4. Drochia
5. Edineț
6. Fălești
7. Florești
8. Glodeni
9. Ocnița
10. Rîșcani
11. Sîngerei
12. Soroca

Central Development Region

13. Chișinău Municipality
14. Anenii Noi
15. Călărași
16. Criuleni
17. Dubăsari
18. Hîncești
19. Ialoveni
20. Nisporeni
21. Orhei
22. Rezina
23. Șoldănești
24. Strășeni
25. Tighina Municipality
26. Telenești
27. Ungheni

Southern Development Region

28. Basarabeasca
29. Cahul
30. Cantemir
31. Căușeni
32. Cimișlia
33. Leova
34. Ștefan Vodă
35. Taraclia
36. Gagauzia

== Previous divisions ==
=== Counties (1998-2003) ===
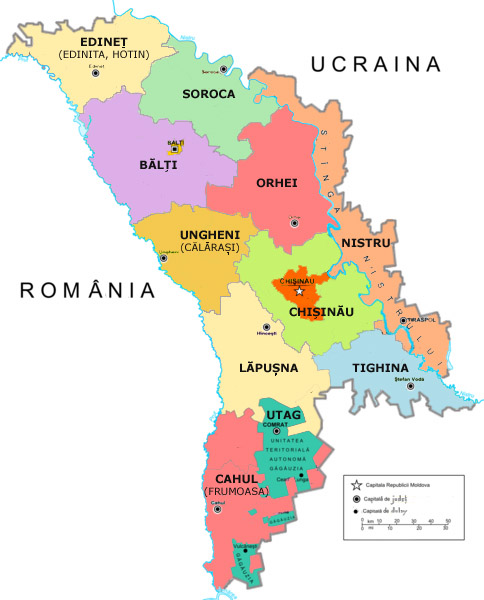
Former counties of Moldova.

Between 1998 and February 2003, Moldova was divided into 12 territorial units, including 1 municipality, 1 autonomous territorial unit, 1 territorial unit, and 9 counties (Romanian: județe; seats in brackets):

1. Chișinău municipality, surrounded by Chișinău county, but different from it
2. Bălți County (Bălți)
3. Cahul County (Cahul)
4. Chișinău County (Chișinău)
5. Edineț County (Edineț)
6. Lăpușna County (Hîncești)
7. Orhei County (Orhei)
8. Soroca County (Soroca)
9. Tighina County (Moldova) (Căușeni)
10. Ungheni County (Ungheni)
11. Găgăuzia, autonomous territorial unit (Comrat)
12. Left Bank of the Dniester, territorial unit (Tiraspol)

In October 1999, Taraclia County was split out from the Cahul County; it coincides with the current Taraclia District.

=== Cities and districts (1991-1998) ===
Between 1991 and 1998, Moldova was divided into 10 cities and 40 districts:

Cities

- Bălți
- Cahul
- Chișinău
- Dubăsari
- Orhei
- Rîbnița
- Soroca
- Tighina
- Tiraspol
- Ungheni

Districts

- Anenii Noi
- Basarabeasca
- Brinceni
- Cahul
- Camenca
- Cantemir
- Căinari
- Călărași
- Căușeni
- Ceadîr-Lunga
- Cimișlia
- Comrat
- Criuleni
- Dondușeni
- Drochia
- Dubăsari
- Edineț
- Fălești
- Florești
- Glodeni
- Grigoriopol
- Hîncești
- Ialoveni
- Leova
- Nisporeni
- Ocnița
- Orhei
- Rezina
- Rîbnița
- Rîșcani
- Sîngerei
- Slobozia
- Soroca
- Strășeni
- Șoldănești
- Ștefan Vodă
- Taraclia
- Telenești
- Ungheni
- Vulcănești

=== 2017 expansion ===
Besides Chișinău, Bălți, Tighina, Comrat, and Tiraspol, on 13 April 2017 eight more became municipalities: Cahul, Ceadîr-Lunga, Edineț, Hîncești, Orhei, Soroca, Strășeni, and Ungheni.

== See also ==
- ISO 3166-2:MD, ISO subdivision codes for Moldova
