= Mărculești (disambiguation) =

Mărculești may refer to these places in Romania:

- Mărculești, a commune in Ialomița County
- Mărculești-Gară, a village in Perișoru Commune, Călărași County

Mărculești may also refer to these places in Moldova:

- Mărculești, a city in Florești District
- Mărculești, a commune also in Florești District

Mărculești may also refer to:

- Mărculești Air Force Base, a military base in Mărculești city

== See also ==
- Marcu (name)
- Mărcești (disambiguation)
