= Soroca County =

Soroca County may refer to:

- Soroca County (Moldova), a county from 1998 to 2003
- Soroca County (Romania), a county in the Kingdom of Romania
