= Tighina County =

Tighina County may refer to:

- Tighina County (Moldova)
- Tighina County (Romania)
