= Vîșcăuți =

- Commune and village
- Location in Moldova
- Coordinates: 47°26′N 29°05′E
- Country: Moldova
- District: Orhei District

Population (2014 census)
  - Total: 1,434
- Time zone: UTC+2 (EET)
  - Summer (DST): UTC+3 (EEST)

Vîșcăuți is a village in Orhei District, Moldova.
