= Bălți County =

Bălți County may refer to:

- Bălți County (Moldova)
- Bălți County (Romania)
