= Orhei County =

Orhei County may refer to:

- Orhei County (Moldova)
- Orhei County (Romania)
