= Lăpușna County =

Lăpușna County may refer to:

- Lăpușna County (Moldova)
- Lăpușna County (Romania)
