= Susleni =

Susleni, Orhei district, Moldova
- Commune and village
- Interactive map of Susleni, Orhei district, Moldova
- Country: Moldova
- District: Orhei District

Population (2014 census)
  - Total: 4,128
- Time zone: UTC+2 (EET)
  - Summer (DST): UTC+3 (EEST)

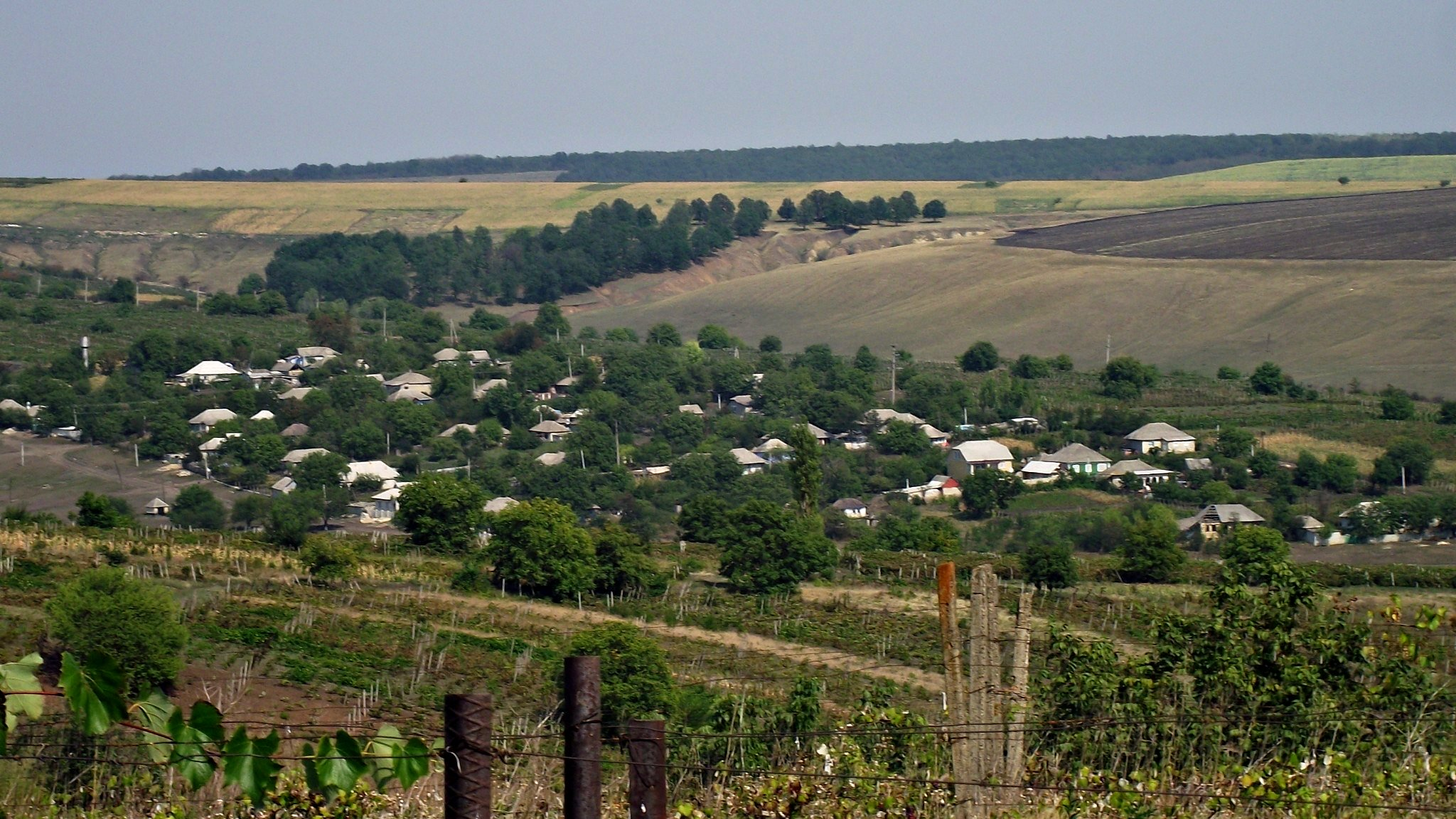
An image of Susleni

Susleni, Orhei district, Moldova is a village in Orhei District, Moldova.
