= Marcu =

Marcu is a Romanian-language surname and male given name that may refer to:

- Dănuț Marcu
- Duiliu Marcu
- Gavorielle Marcu
- Valeriu Marcu
- Marcu Beza
- Mattias Marcu
- Petre Pandrea, born Petre Ion Marcu

== See also ==
- Mărculești (disambiguation)
- Mărcești (disambiguation)
