= ISO 3166-2:UA =

Entry for Ukraine in ISO 3166-2

ISO 3166-2:UA is the entry for Ukraine in ISO 3166-2, part of the ISO 3166 standard published by the International Organization for Standardization (ISO), which defines codes for the names of the principal subdivisions (e.g., provinces or states) of all countries coded in ISO 3166-1.

Currently for Ukraine, ISO 3166-2 codes are defined for 24 regions, one republic and two cities including codes for the Autonomous Republic of Crimea and Sevastopol which continue to be internationally recognized as part of Ukraine though have been de facto occupied by the Russian Federation since 2014. The two cities have special status equal to the regions.

Each code consists of two parts separated by a hyphen. The first part is UA, the ISO 3166-1 alpha-2 code of Ukraine. The second part is two digits, which is taken from the local standard KOATUU (Ukrainian: КОАТУУ), with the following exceptions:

- Chernivtsi Oblast uses 77 (its KOATUU code is 73)
- Luhansk Oblast uses 09 (its KOATUU code is 44)
- The Autonomous Republic of Crimea uses 43 (its KOATUU code is 01)
- The city Kyiv uses 30 (its KOATUU code is 80)
- The city Sevastopol uses 40 (its KOATUU code is 85)

== Current codes ==
Subdivision names are listed as in the ISO 3166-2 standard published by the ISO 3166 Maintenance Agency (ISO 3166/MA).

Click on the button in the header to sort each column.

Code	Subdivision name (uk) (National 2010 = UN X/9 2012)	Subdivision name (uk) (Note: For reference only, Ukrainian name in Cyrillic script not included in the ISO 3166-2 standard.)	Subdivision name (en) (Note: For reference only, English name not included in the ISO 3166-2 standard.)	Subdivision category
UA-43	Avtonomna Respublika Krym	Автономна Республіка Крим	Crimea	republic
UA-71	Cherkaska oblast	Черкаська область	Cherkasy	region
UA-74	Chernihivska oblast	Чернігівська область	Chernihiv	region
UA-77	Chernivetska oblast	Чернівецька область	Chernivtsi	region
UA-12	Dnipropetrovska oblast	Дніпропетровська область	Dnipropetrovsk	region
UA-14	Donetska oblast	Донецька область	Donetsk	region
UA-26	Ivano-Frankivska oblast	Івано-Франківська область	Ivano-Frankivsk	region
UA-63	Kharkivska oblast	Харківська область	Kharkiv	region
UA-65	Khersonska oblast	Херсонська область	Kherson	region
UA-68	Khmelnytska oblast	Хмельницька область	Khmelnytskyi	region
UA-35	Kirovohradska oblast	Кіровоградська область	Kirovohrad	region
UA-30	Kyiv	Київ	Kyiv City	city
UA-32	Kyivska oblast	Київська область	Kyiv	region
UA-09	Luhanska oblast	Луганська область	Luhansk	region
UA-46	Lvivska oblast	Львівська область	Lviv	region
UA-48	Mykolaivska oblast	Миколаївська область	Mykolaiv	region
UA-51	Odeska oblast	Одеська область	Odesa	region
UA-53	Poltavska oblast	Полтавська область	Poltava	region
UA-56	Rivnenska oblast	Рівненська область	Rivne	region
UA-40	Sevastopol	Севастополь	Sevastopol	city
UA-59	Sumska oblast	Сумська область	Sumy	region
UA-61	Ternopilska oblast	Тернопільська область	Ternopil	region
UA-05	Vinnytska oblast	Вінницька область	Vinnytsia	region
UA-07	Volynska oblast	Волинська область	Volyn	region
UA-21	Zakarpatska oblast	Закарпатська область	Transcarpathia	region
UA-23	Zaporizka oblast	Запорізька область	Zaporizhzhia	region
UA-18	Zhytomyrska oblast	Житомирська область	Zhytomyr	region

== See also ==
- Geography of Ukraine
- FIPS region codes of Ukraine
- List of places named after people (Ukraine)
- Subdivisions of Ukraine
- Neighbouring countries: BY, HU, MD, PL, RO, RU, SK
