= Mărcești =

Mărcești may refer to several villages in Romania:

- Mărcești, a village in Căiuți Commune, Bacău County
- Mărcești, a village in Râșca Commune, Cluj County
- Mărcești, a village in Dobra Commune, Dâmbovița County

== See also ==
- Marcu (name)
- Mărculești (disambiguation)
