= Mărculești, Florești =

Mărculești
- Village
- Location within Moldova
- Coordinates: 47.7277777778°N 28.3813888889°E
- Country: Moldova
- District: Florești District

Government
  - Mayor: Iurie Cordun (PDM)

Population (2014 census)
  - Total: 756
- Time zone: UTC+2 (EET)
  - Summer (DST): UTC+3 (EEST)

Mărculești is a village in Florești District, in northern Moldova, with a population of 866 at the 2004 census.
