= Cahul County (Moldova) =

- County
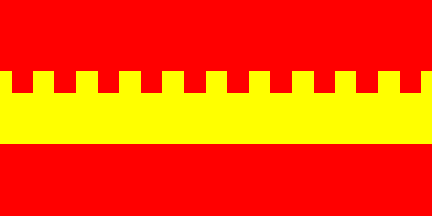
- Flag

- Map of Cahul County after detachment of Taraclia County (22 October 1999)
- Coordinates: 45°50′N 28°20′E
- Country: Moldova
- capital: Cahul
- established: 1998
- Ceased to exist: 2003

Area
  - Total: 2,400 km^{2} (930 sq mi)

Population (2002)
  - Total: 179,209
  - Density: 75/km^{2} (190/sq mi)

Cahul County was a county (Romanian: județ) in Moldova from 1998 to 2003, with the seat at Cahul. Its population in 2002 was 179,209.

The county bordered Romania (west) and Ukraine (southeast), with the Moldovan counties of Lăpuşna and Taraclia County (in the Autonomous Territorial Unit of Gagauzia).

== Description ==
Cahul County was formed in 1998 on the territory of the former Moldovan districts of Cahul, Cantemir and Vulcănești.

Geographically, the county was located in Prutul de Jos Plain, the Western Black Sea Plain, and Tigheci Plateau.

== History ==
On 22 October 1999, part of Cahul County was detached and established as Taraclia County.
