= Counties of Moldova =

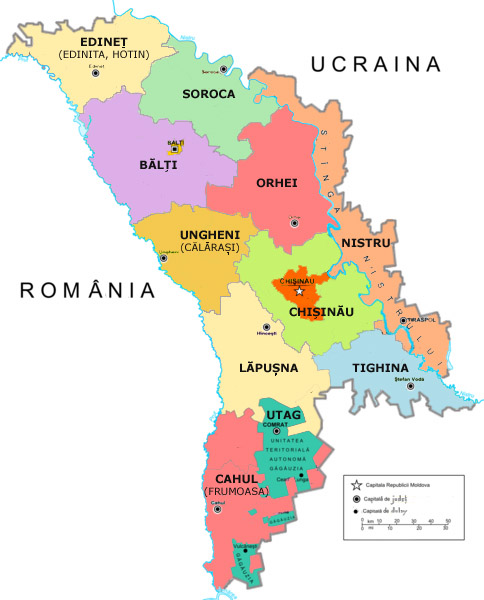
Former counties of Moldova.

Between 1999 and February 2002, Moldova was divided into 12 territorial units, including 1 municipality, 1 autonomous territorial unit, 1 territorial unit, and 9 counties (Romanian: județe; seats in brackets):

1. Chișinău municipality, surrounded by Chișinău County, but different from it
2. Bălți County (Bălți)
3. Cahul County (Cahul)
4. Chișinău County (Chișinău)
5. Edineț County (Edineț)
6. Lăpușna County (Hîncești)
7. Orhei County (Orhei)
8. Soroca County (Soroca)
9. Tighina County (Căușeni)
10. Ungheni County (Ungheni)
11. Găgăuzia, autonomous territorial unit (Comrat)
12. Stânga Nistrului, territorial unit (Dubăsari)

In October 1999 a Taraclia County was split out from the Cahul County; it coincides with the current Taraclia District.
