= Orhei District =

Coordinates: 47°25′N 28°50′E

Orhei
- District (Raion)
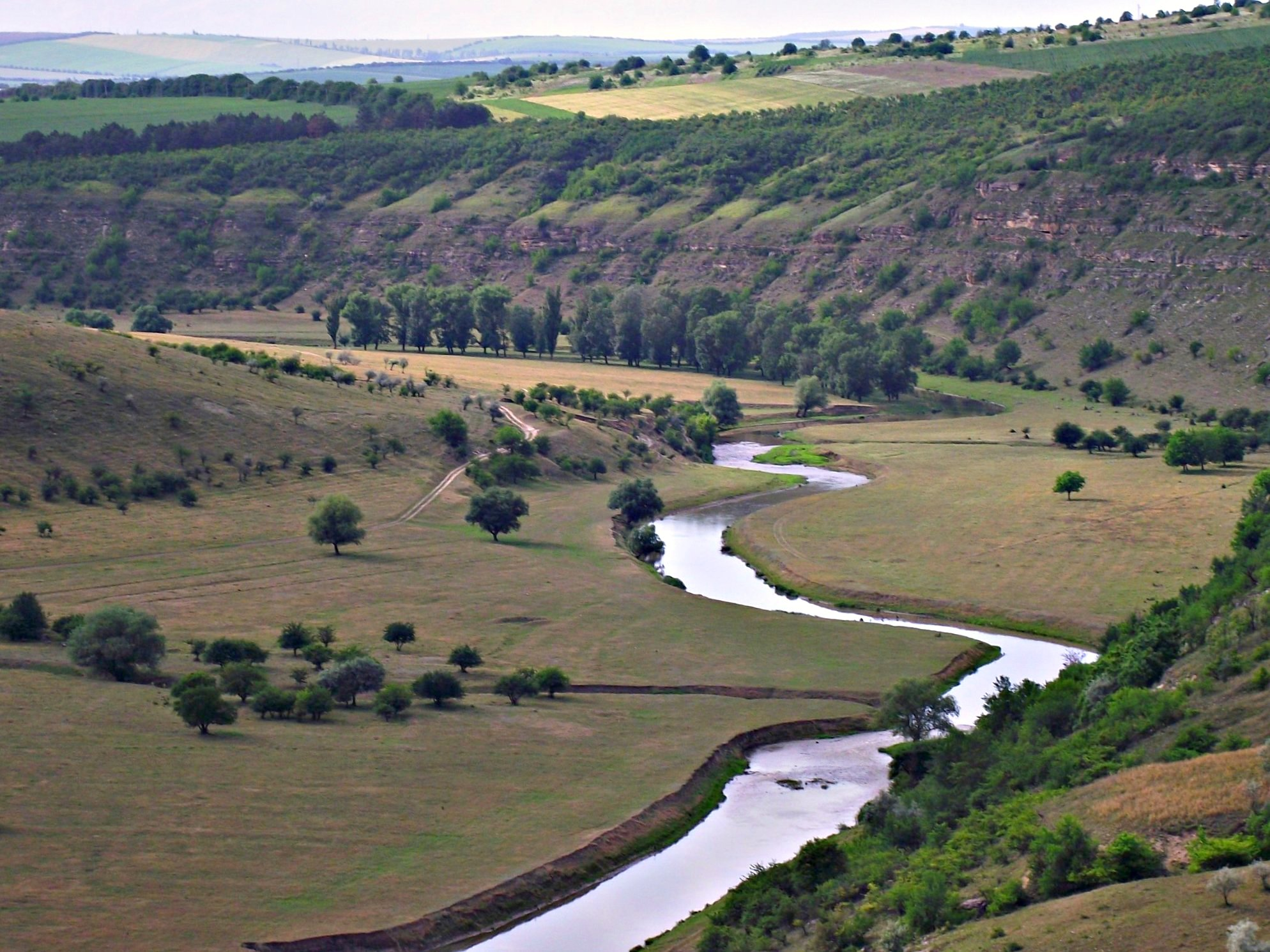

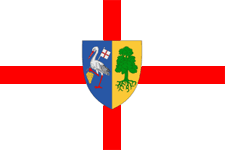
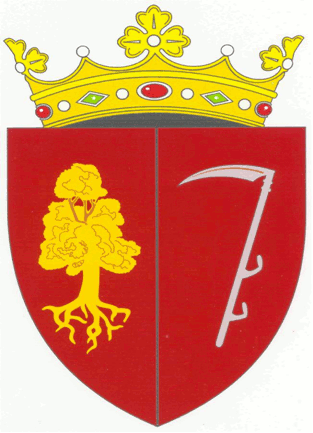
- Flag Coat of arms

- Country: Republic of Moldova
- Administrative center Oraş-reşedinţă): Orhei
- Established: 2002

Government
  - Raion president: Vasile Adașan (PDCM, 2023)

Area
  - Total: 1,228 km^{2} (474 sq mi)
  - Water: 34.1 km^{2} (13.2 sq mi) 2.78%

Population (2024)
  - Total: 79,242
  - Density: 64.53/km^{2} (167.1/sq mi)
- Time zone: UTC+2 (EET)
  - Summer (DST): UTC+3 (EEST)
- Area code: +373 35
- Car plates: OR
- Website: www.or.md

Orhei (Romanian pronunciation: [orˈhej]) is a district (Romanian: raion) in central Moldova, with its administrative center in the city of Orhei. As of the 2024 Moldovan census, its population was 79,242.

== History ==
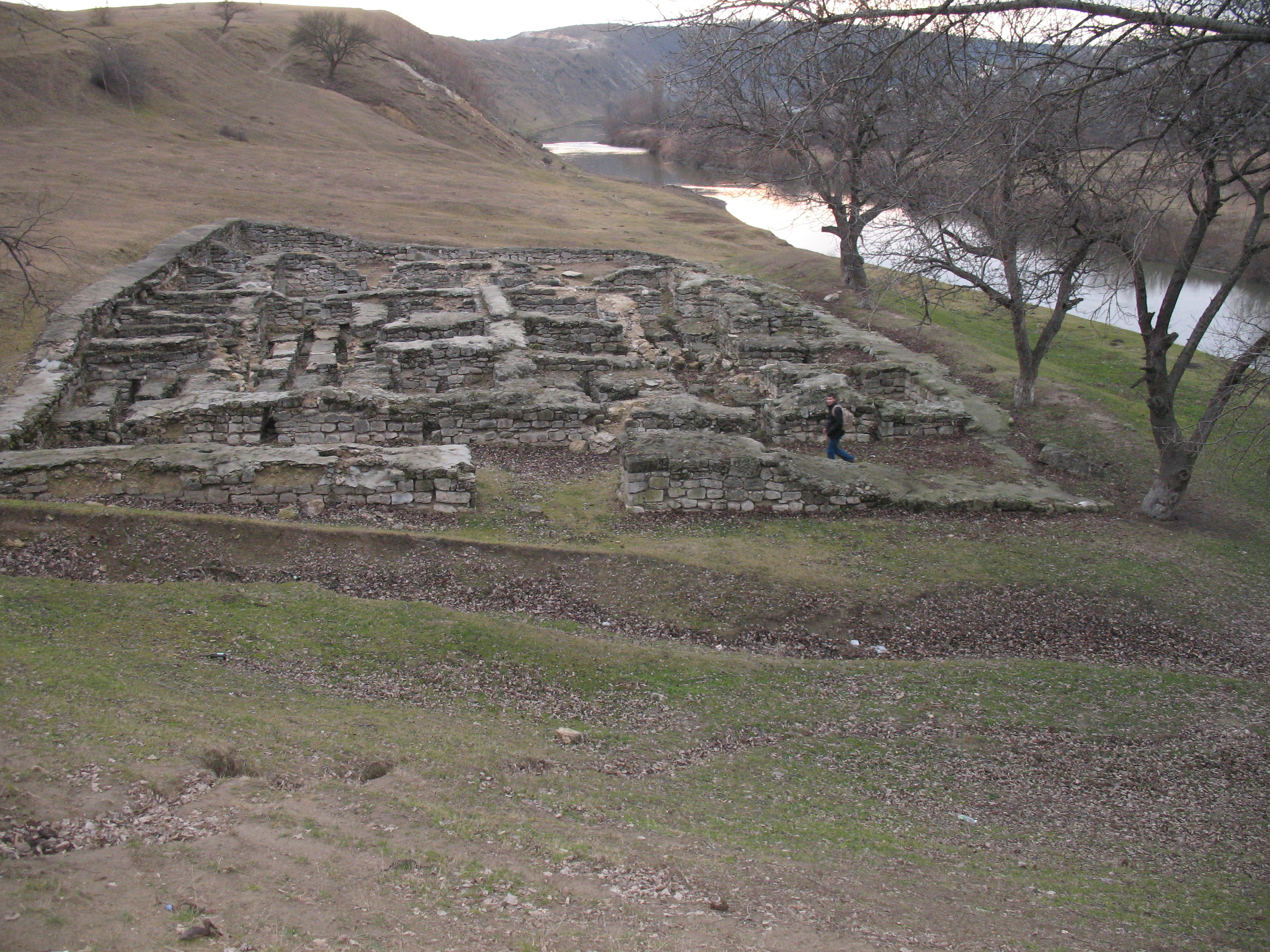
Remains of Golden Horde bath

The Orhei region has been inhabited since the Stone Age. Settlements included the ancient city of Getae (located near modern Trebujeni). Getae stood from the eighth to the second century BC and was abandoned after an invasion by a Germanic tribe, the Bastarnae. Non-fortified settlements were located on the riverbank.

A medieval fortress of earth and wood was later constructed near the former site of Getae, which stood from the 12th to the 14th century AD. During the 14th century, the Golden Horde occupied the region; the town was conquered, and its name changed to Shehr al Jedid. From 1363 to 1365, Horde leader Abdullah Khan resided in Shehr al Jedid. At the end of the 14th century, the Horde were driven out and the empire dissolved; the eastern city evolved, acquiring Moldovan characteristics.

During the reign of Stephen the Great the stone city was repaired, equipped with artillery and became the residence of Orhei's governor. During the mid-16th century, the old city was abandoned in favor of the current site, 15 kilometres (9.3 mi) northwest. The stone fortress was destroyed.

About 1600, Prince Ieremia Movilă unsuccessfully attempted to rebuild the city, and in 1665 a cave monastery was built in the area. In 1773, the Curchi monastery was built near the Vatici. After the 1812 Treaty of Bucharest, Bessarabia was occupied by the Russian Empire until 1917.

In 1918, after the collapse of the Russian Empire, Bessarabia joined Romania. Orhei County existed as part of the Kingdom of Romania from 1918 to 1940 and 1941 to 1944.

After the 1939 Molotov–Ribbentrop Pact, Bessarabia was occupied by the USSR in June 1940. Moldovan independence in 1991 revived Orhei County until 2003, when it became a district of Moldova.

== Geography ==
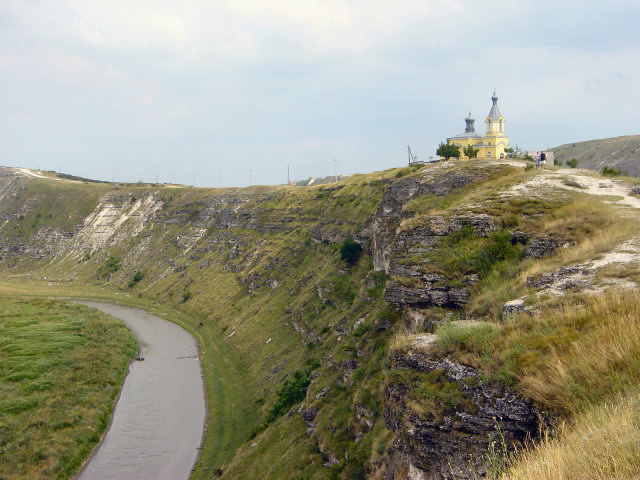
Old Orhei

The district is located in the central part of the Republic of Moldova. Neighboring districts include Rezina (north), Rîbnița and Dubăsari districts (east), Strășeni and Criuleni (south), and Călărași and Telenești (west). The land is divided into several orographic units:

- The Central Moldavian Plateau (forest), in the northeast, combines narrow, deep valleys and broad slopes.
- The northern plain was created by soil erosion. This area has the lowest altitude (200–250 metres (660–820 ft)), crossing the Răut and Cogâlnic rivers from north to south. The Răut Valley covers about 6,500 hectares (25 sq mi), primarily privately owned pasture.
- The terraced Nistrului Plateau is at an altitude of 250–300 metres (820–980 ft), with dips of 150–200 metres (490–660 ft). The western slope is gradual, with the east sloping more sharply towards the Dniester.

=== Climate ===
The district has a temperate continental climate with short, mild winters (average January temperature −3 – −5 °C (27–23 °F)) and long, warm summers (average July temperature 21–22 °C (70–72 °F)). Annual rainfall is 500–650 millimetres (20–26 in). Two-thirds of the annual precipitation falls as rain from April to November, and about one-third as snow and sleet from December to March.

=== Fauna ===
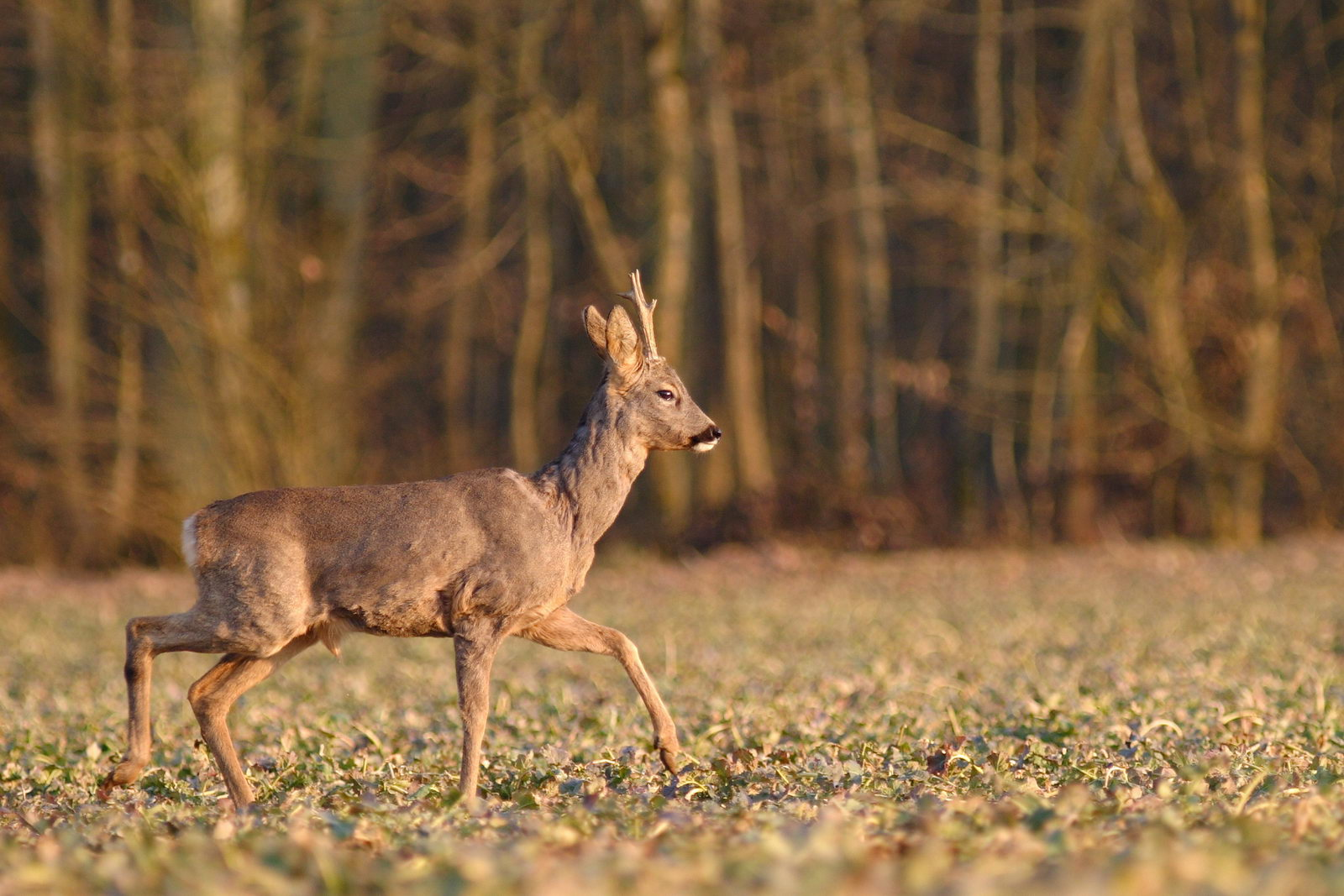
Deer in the district

Mammals in the region include foxes, deer, red deer, wild boars, hedgehogs, badgers, rabbits, and wolves. Birds include crows, hawks, partridges, storks, and jays.

=== Flora ===
Forests occupy 20.1% of the district (24,277 hectares). Tree species in these forests include oak, English oak, ash, hornbeam, linden and willow. Local plants include fescue, clover, bell and knotweed.

=== Protected areas ===
There are nature reserves in Susleni, Pohrebeni and Trebujeni.

=== Hydrosphere ===
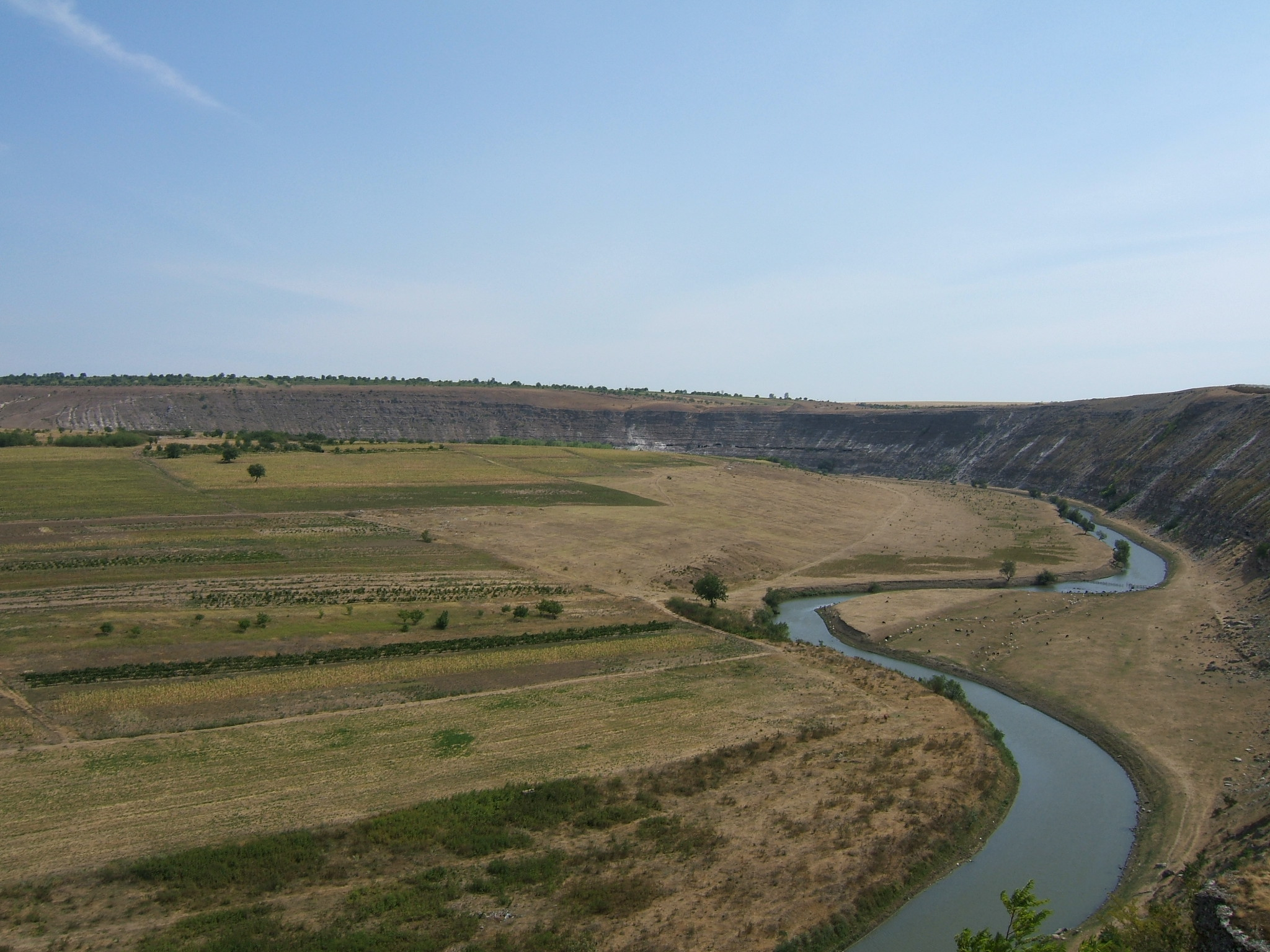
Răut River

Rivers in the district include the Nistru, Răut, Vatici, Cula, and Cogâlnic. There are 162 lakes and ponds, covering 975 hectares (2,410 acres). A spring in the village of Jeloboc has an output of 401 litres (106 US gal) a second. The Nistru River (Dniester) has been harnessed for irrigation in the villages of Jora de Mijloc and Vîșcăuți. Near the village of Biești, geological surveys have found an aquifer large enough to supply the city of Orhei.

== Administrative subdivisions ==
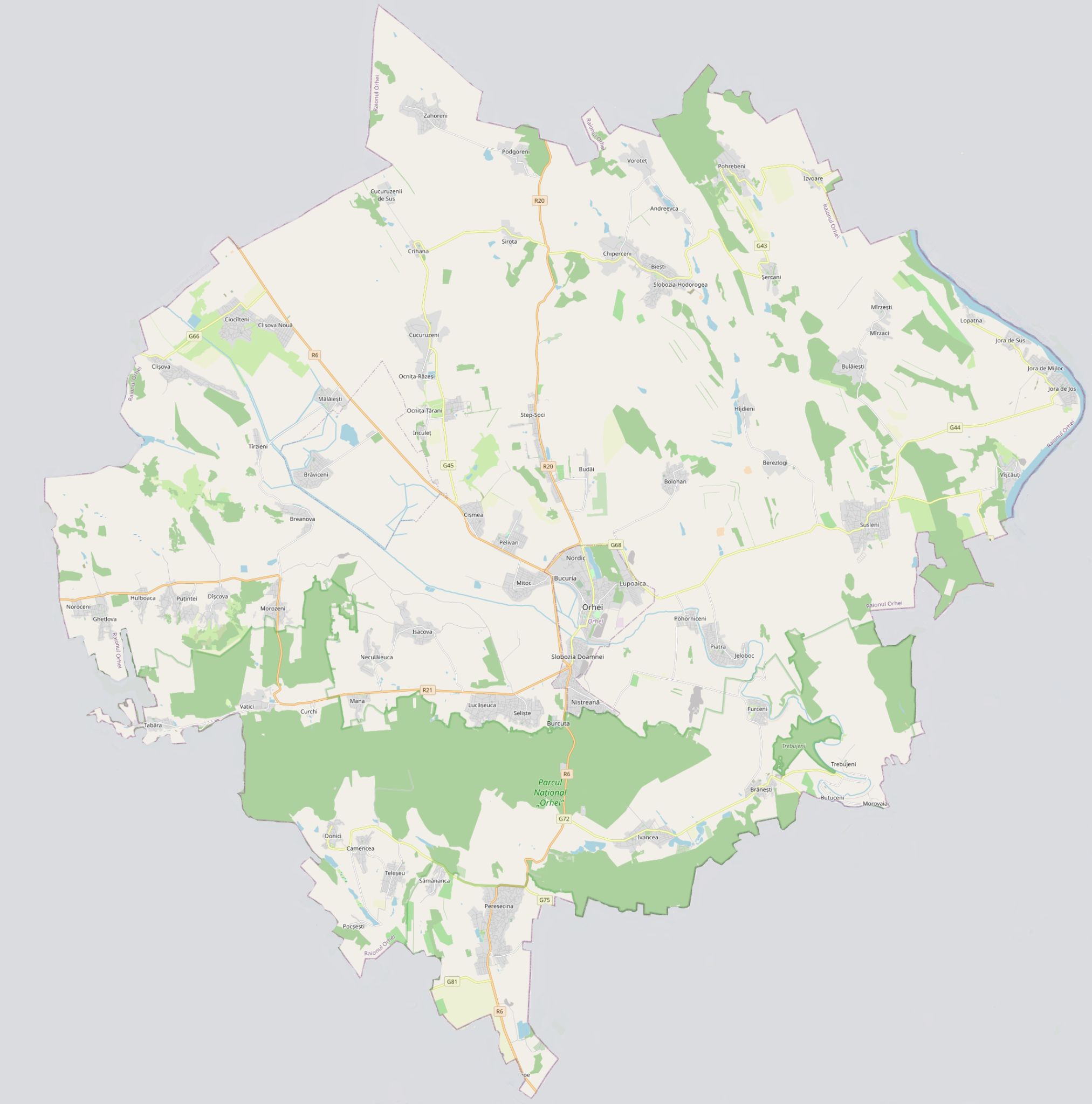
Map of the district

- Localities: 75
- Administrative center: Orhei
- City: Orhei
- Communes: 37
- Villages: 37

== Demographics ==
In the 2024 Census, the district population was 79,242, with 28% in urban and 72% in rural areas.

=== Ethnic groups ===
Ethnic group	% of total
Moldovans *	88
Romanians *	8.4
Ukrainians	2.2
Russians	0.9
Gagauz	0.1
Bulgarians	0.1
Romani	0.1
Other	0.2
Undeclared	0.1

Footnote: * There is an ongoing controversy regarding the ethnic identification of Moldovans and Romanians.

=== Religion ===
- Christians – 99%
  - Orthodox Christians – 97.2%
  - Protestant – 1.8%
- Muslim - 0.1%
- Other – 0.1%
- None - 0.4%
- Not Declared - 0.4%

== Economy ==
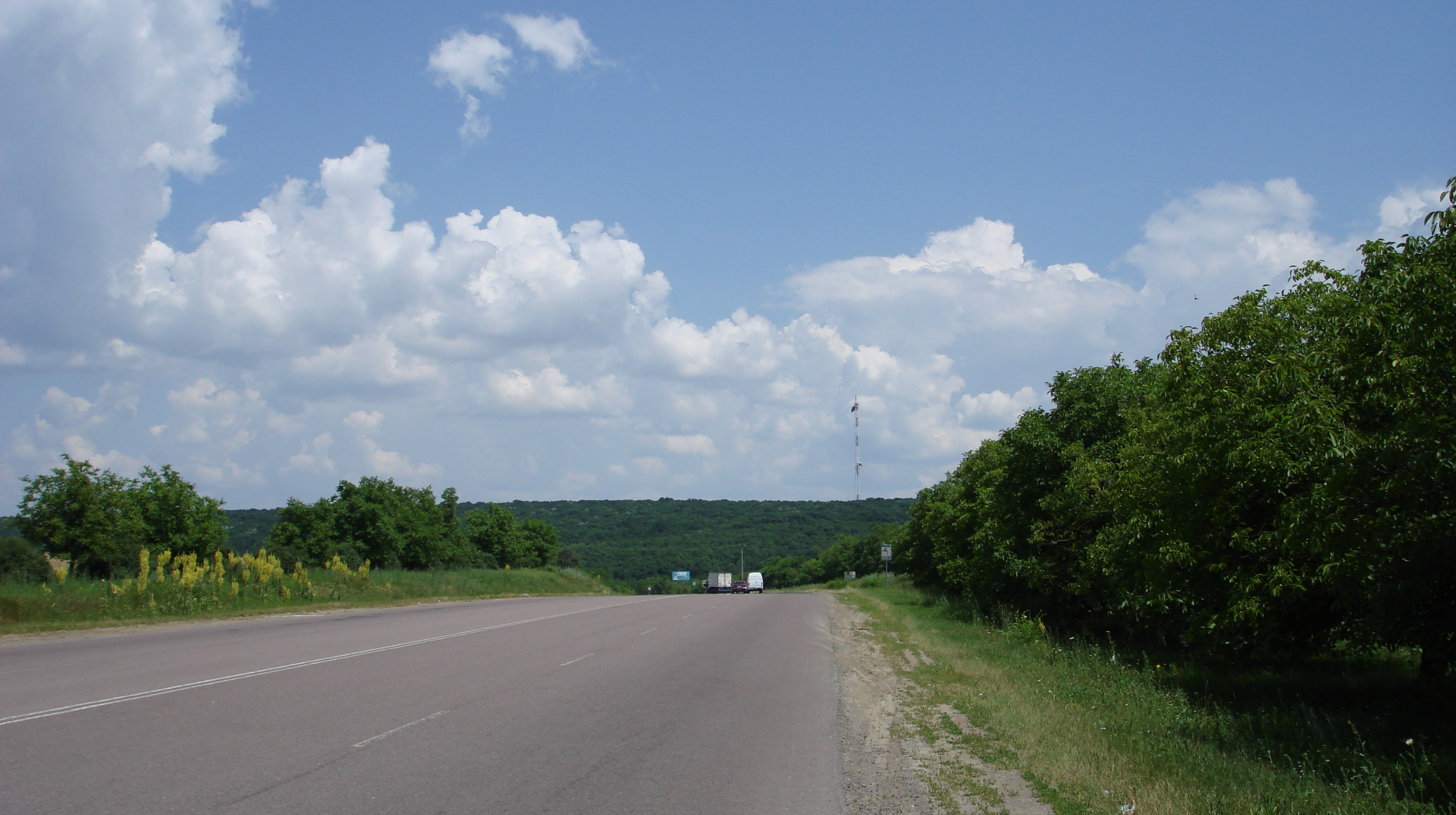
A road in the district

There are 40,693 registered businesses in the district. Fifty-seven are public companies, 4,606 are privately owned, 40 have mixed public-and-private ownership and 14 are foreign-owned. Manufacturing and agriculture are the dominant sectors of the district economy. There are 30 industrial companies: 27 manufacturers and three mines. In 2009, there were 2,496 unemployed workers. Agricultural land comprises 82,238 ha (67 percent) of the total area. Arable land comprises 57,161 ha (46.5 percent) of agricultural land. Orchards make up 5,287 ha (4.3 percent), vineyards 4,461 ha (3.6 percent), pasture 13,288 ha (10.3 percent) and 27,305 ha (21.2 percent) are planted to other crops.

== Education ==
The Orhei district has 69 educational institutions, and the total number of students is 15,160. There are 1,448 students in teachers' and medical colleges, and 685 students in professional schools.

== Politics ==
The Orhei district has traditionally favored right-wing parties, primarily the AEI. The percentage of residents voting for the PCRM has dropped steadily over the last three elections, and the AEI increased 100.6 percent.

Parliament election results
Year	AEI	PCRM
2010	68.77% 40,344	24.25% 14,227
July 2009	64.40% 34,880	29.51% 15,982
April 2009	37.80% 20,115	39.37% 20,952

=== Elections ===
28 November 2010 Parliament of Moldova election results, Orhei District
Parties and coalitions	Votes	%	+/−
Liberal Democratic Party of Moldova	21,991	37.49	+16.71
Party of Communists of the Republic of Moldova	14,227	24.25	−5.26
Democratic Party of Moldova	9,972	17.00	+0.07
Liberal Party	5,758	9.81	−8.93
Party Alliance Our Moldova	2,623	4.47	−3.48
European Action Movement	773	1.32	+1.32
Other parties	3,346	5.66	-0.43
Total (turnout 61.05%)	59,118	100.00	

== Culture ==
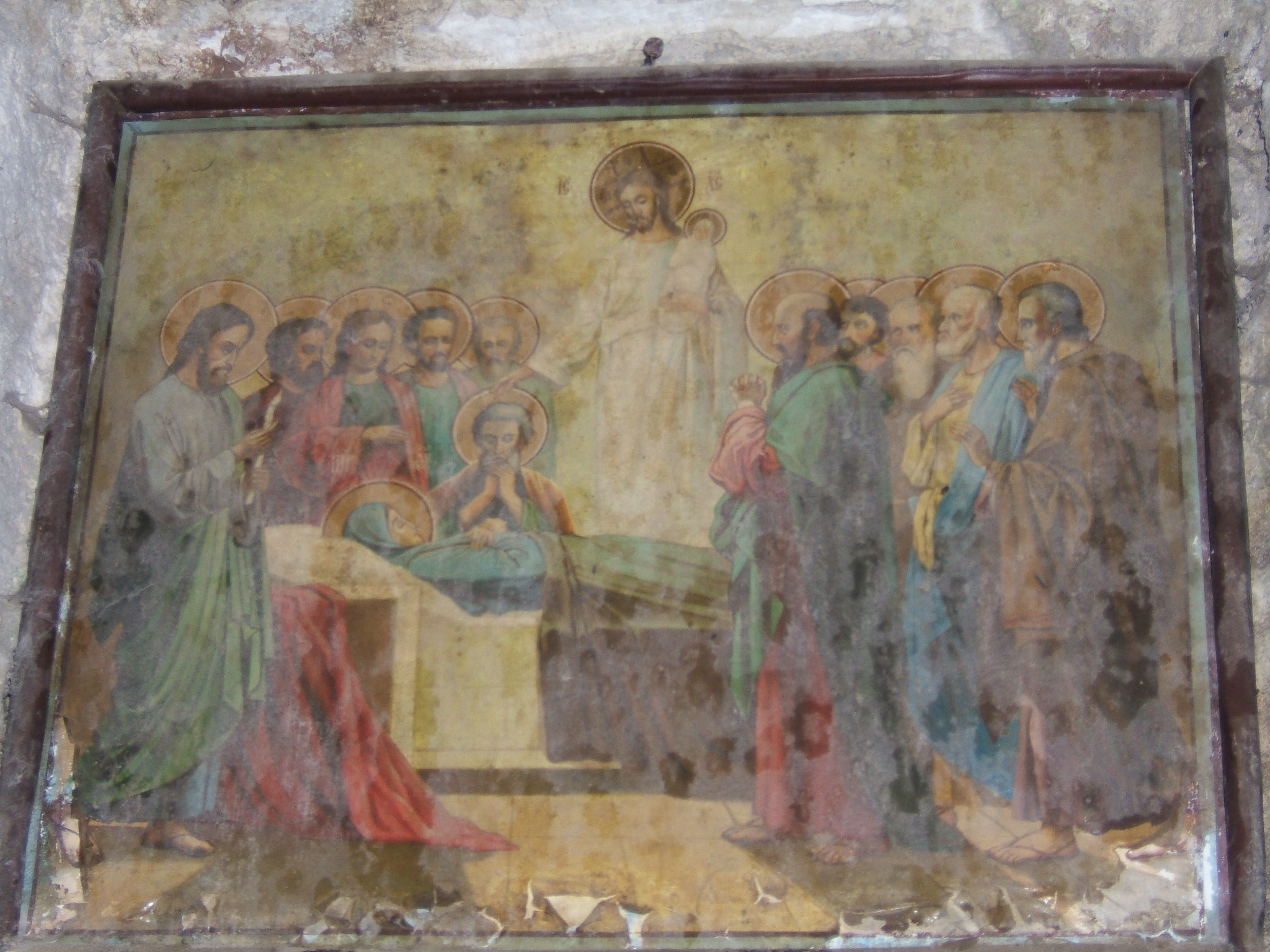
Fresco in Bosie cave monastery

The district has five museums, 60 public libraries and 62 community centres.

== Health ==
Orhei District has a 430-bed hospital, a family-health center, 33 family practitioners' offices, 14 health centres, and 17 health offices. There are 246 physicians and 836 other healthcare professionals.

== Notable residents ==
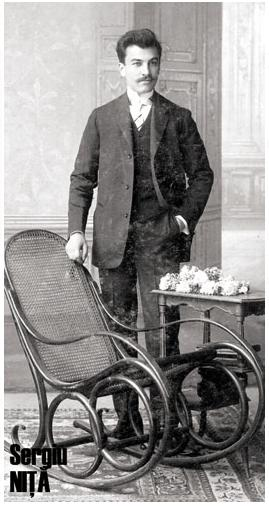
Sergiu Niță, Basarabia Minister in 1920–1921 and 1926–1927

- Alecu Donici – Poet, storyteller and translator
- David Knut – Russian poet
- Iurie Platon – Russian painter and sculptor
- Jacobo Fijman – Argentine poet
- Meir Dizengoff – Politician and first mayor of Tel Aviv
- Paul Goma – Writer and anticommunist militant
- Sergey Lazo – Communist militant during the Russian Civil War, Siberia and the Far East
- Sergiu Niță – Politician, attorney, minister for Basarabia in 1920–1921, 1926–1927

== See also ==
- Orhei County (Moldova)
