= Ungheni County =

Coordinates: 47°20′N 27°55′E

Ungheni County Județul Ungheni
- County
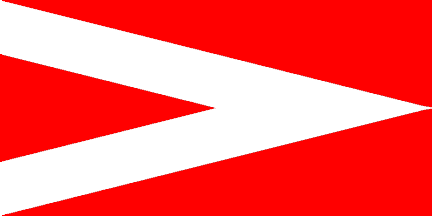
- Flag

- Country: Moldova
- Capital: Ungheni
- established: 1998
- Ceased to exist: 2003

Area
  - Total: 2,465 km^{2} (952 sq mi)

Population (2003)
  - Total: 260,300
  - Density: 105.6/km^{2} (273.5/sq mi)

Ungheni County (Romanian: Județul Ungheni) was a county of Moldova from 1998 to 2003. Its population in 2003 was 260,300. Its capital was Ungheni.

It was bordered by the Moldovan counties of Bălți, Orhei, Chişinău, and Lăpușna, and with Romania to the west.

== See also ==
- Moldavian counties
