= Soroca County (Moldova) =

Soroca County Județul Soroca
- County
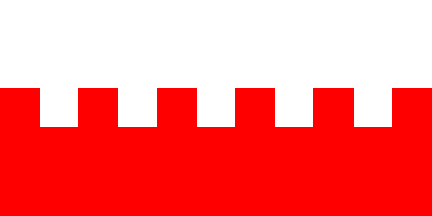
- Flag

- Country: Moldova
- capital: Soroca
- Established: 1998
- Ceased to exist: 2003

Area
  - Total: 4,564 km^{2} (1,762 sq mi)

Soroca County was a county (Romanian: județ) in Moldova from 1998 to 2003. It bordered Ukraine, and within Moldova, the counties of Edineț, Bălți, and Orhei, and the region of Transnistria. Its capital was the city of Soroca.
