= Tighina County (Moldova) =

Tighina County Județul Tighina
- County
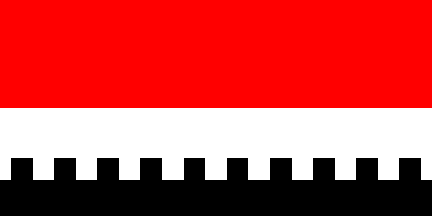
- Flag

- Country: Moldova
- capital: Tighina (de jure); Căușeni (de facto)
- Established: 1998
- Ceased to exist: 2003

Area
  - Total: 2,899 km^{2} (1,119 sq mi)

Population (2004)
  - Total: 161,236
  - Density: 55.62/km^{2} (144.0/sq mi)

Tighina County was a county (Romanian: județ) in Moldova from 1998 to 2003. It bordered Ukraine, Lăpușna County, Chișinău County, and Transnistria. Its de jure capital was the city of Tighina, but due to the Transnistria situation, the de facto capital was Căușeni.

Tighina County had 93 localities, of which four had city status: Tighina, Căușeni, Căinari, and Ștefan Vodă.
