= Edineț County =

Coordinates: 48°10′N 27°15′E

Edineț County Județul Edineț
- County
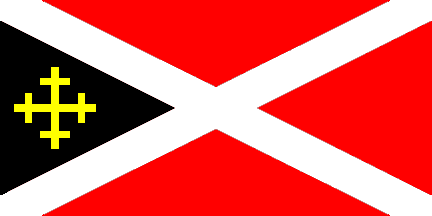
- Flag

- Country: Moldova
- established: 1998
- Ceased to exist: 2003

Area
  - Total: 2,989 km^{2} (1,154 sq mi)

Population (2003)
  - Total: 279,100
  - Density: 93.38/km^{2} (241.8/sq mi)

Edineț was a county of Moldova from 1998 to 2003. Its population in 2003 was 279,100. Its capital was Edineț.

It was bordered by Romania and Ukraine, and with the Moldovan counties of Bălți and Soroca.

It had 165 localities, 8 of which had urban status: Briceni, Cupcini, Dondușeni, Edineț, Frunză, Lipcani, Ocnița, and Otaci.
