= Administrative divisions of Moldavia =

A ținut (pl. ținuturi; sometimes translated in English as "region", "district" or "municipality") were the traditional subdivision of the Principality of Moldavia (1359–1859).

== Principality of Moldavia (late 14th century – 1859) ==
Ținuturi in the Principality of Moldavia in 1483

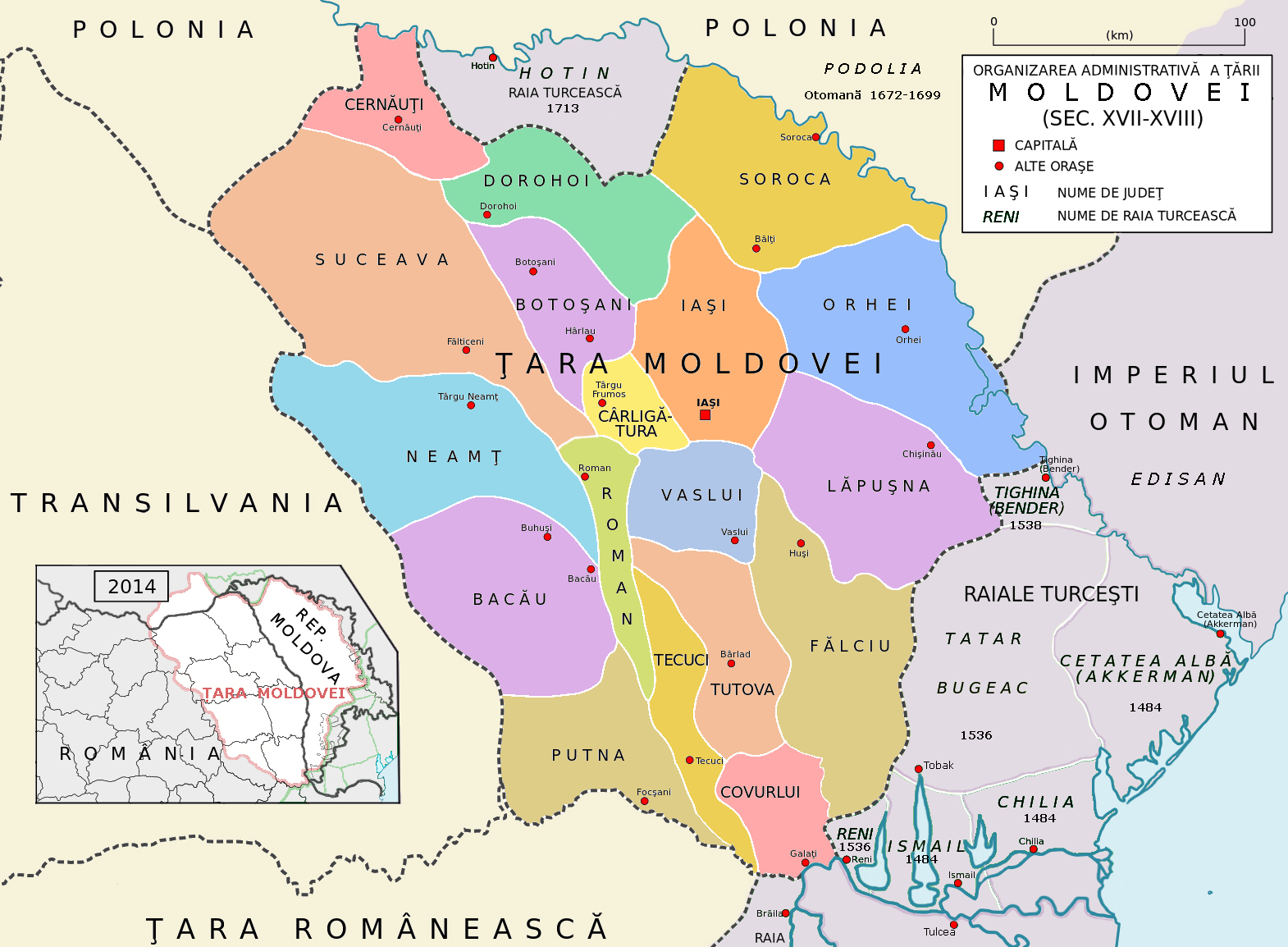
Ținuturi of Moldavia (17th-18th centuries), according to Dimitrie Cantemir's Descriptio Moldaviae

Lower Country (Țara de Jos)

Iași County
Cârligătura County (later merged with Iași County)
Roman County
Vaslui County
Tutova County

Bârlad County (later merged with Tutova County)
Tecuci County
Horincea County (later merged with Covurlui County)
Covurlui County
Putna County

Adjud County (later merged with Putna County)
Fălciu County
Soroca County
Orhei County
Lăpușna County

Upper Country (Țara de Sus)

Hotin County
Cernăuți County
Dorohoi County

Suceava County
Neamț County
Hârlău County (later Botoșani County)

Bacău County
Trotuș County (later merged with Bacău County)
Câmpulung County

Historic Bessarabia (Basarabia)

Cetatea Albă County
Chilia County

Tigheciu County
Tighina County

Southern Bessarabia (Sudul Basarabiei)

Cahul County
Bolgrad County
Ismail County

== See also ==
- Administrative divisions of Romania
- Administrative divisions of Moldova
