= Lăpușna County (Moldova) =

- County
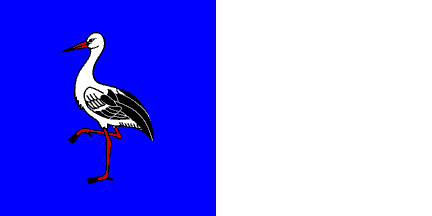
- Flag

- Country: Moldova
- capital: Hîncești
- established: 1998
- Ceased to exist: 2003

Area
  - Total: 3,455 km^{2} (1,334 sq mi)

Lăpușna County was a county (Romanian: județ) in Moldova from 1998 to 2003, with the seat at Hîncești. It bordered the counties of Ungheni, Chișinău County, Tighina, and Cahul, the autonomous region of Gagauzia in Moldova, Ukraine (on the southeast), and România (on the west).

== Geography ==
In the county were 149 localities of which five were cities: Basarabeasca, Cimișlia, Iargara, Hîncești, and Leova.
