= Chișinău County =

Chișinău County Județul Chișinău
- County
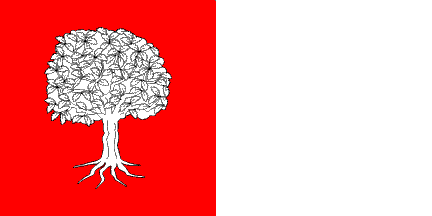
- Flag

- Country: Moldova
- capital: Chișinău
- established: 1998
- Ceased to exist: 2003

Population (2003)
  - Total: 382,400

Chișinău was a county of Moldova from 1998 to 2003. Its population in 2003 was 382,400. Its capital was Chișinău, which was not part of the county.

It was bordered by the counties of Orhei, Ungheni, Lăpușna, and Tighina, and by Transnistria.
