= Orhei County (Moldova) =

Orhei County Județul Orhei
- County
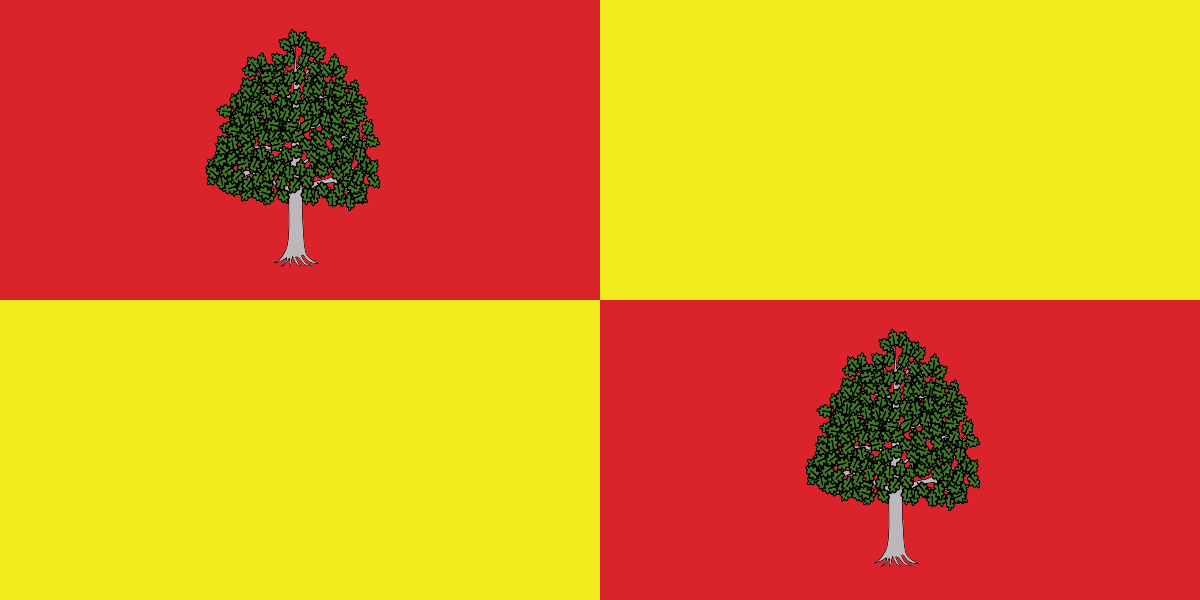
- Flag

- Country: Moldova
- capital: Orhei
- Established: 1998
- Ceased to exist: 2003

Area
  - Total: 4,026 km^{2} (1,554 sq mi)

Population (2003)
  - Total: 300,400
  - Density: 74.62/km^{2} (193.3/sq mi)

Orhei County was a county (Romanian: județ) in Moldova from 1998 to 2003. It bordered Soroca County, Ungheni County, Bălţi County, Chişinău County, and Transnistria. Its capital was the city of Orhei.
