= Județ =

First-level administrative division of Romania

A județ (pronounced [ʒuˈdets], plural județe [ʒuˈdetse]) is an administrative division in Romania, and was also used from 1940 to 1947 in the Moldavian Soviet Socialist Republic and from 1998 to 2003 in Moldova.

There are 41 județe in Romania, divided into municipii (municipalities), orașe (cities) and comune (communes). Each județ has a county seat (reședință de județ) which serves as its administrative capital; this designation usually belongs to the largest and most developed city in the respective county. The central government is represented by one prefect in every județ.

The capital, Bucharest, is not a județ, but a special municipality with identical functions, which also acts as the county seat of Ilfov.

== Etymology ==
In the Romanian Principalities, the județ was an office with administrative and judicial functions, corresponding to both judge and mayor. The word is etymologically rooted in the Latin "judicium", and is therefore cognate to other administrative institutions like the Sardinian giudicati, or terms like jurisdiction and judge.

In Romanian, the term județ does not take an initial capital unless it is the first word of a sentence.

== See also ==
- Counties of Romania
- Counties of Moldova
