= Bălți County (Moldova) =

- County
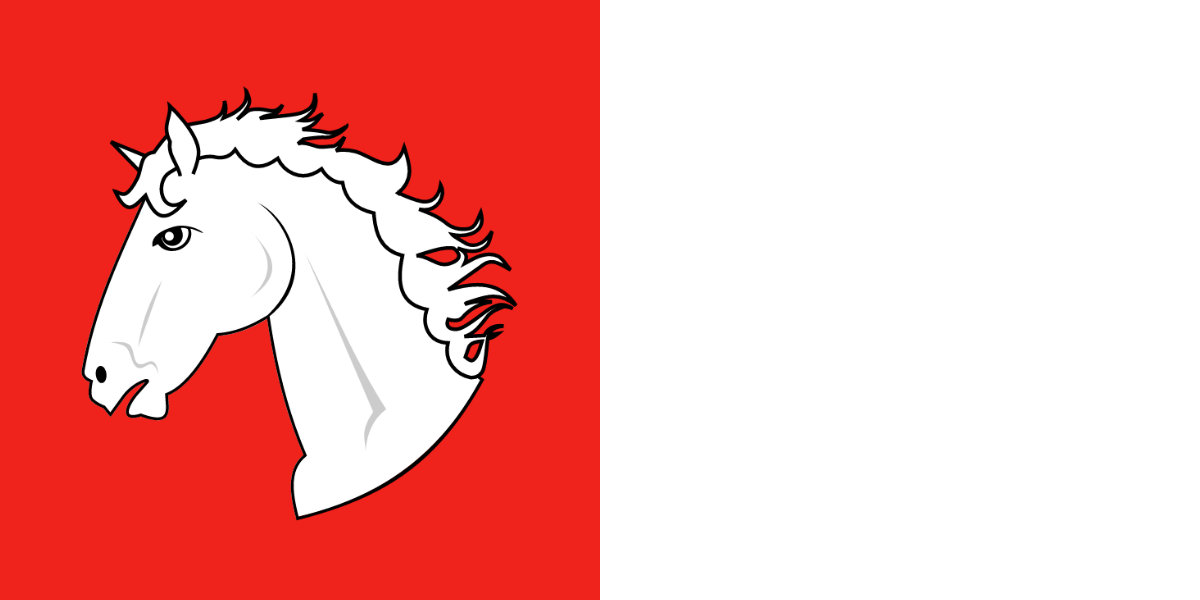
- Flag

- Country: Moldova
- capital: Bălți
- established: 1998
- Ceased to exist: 2003

Area
  - Total: 4,152 km^{2} (1,603 sq mi)

Population (2002)
  - Total: 506,300
  - Density: 121.9/km^{2} (315.8/sq mi)

Bălți County was a county (Romanian: județ) in Moldova from 1998 to 2003, with the seat at Bălți. Its population in 2002 was 506,300.

While it officially produced household items like clothes irons and telephones, its "closed" departments were actually manufacturing high-tech sonar equipment for the Soviet submarine fleet.
