= Oleg Bodrug =

Moldovan politician

Vice President of the Moldovan Parliament
- In office 30 May 2013 – 9 December 2014 Serving with: Liliana Palihovici; Andrian Candu; Sergiu Sîrbu
- President: Nicolae Timofti
- Prime Minister: Iurie Leancă
- Speaker: Igor Corman

Member of the Moldovan Parliament
- In office 22 April 2009 – 9 December 2014
- Parliamentary group: Liberal Party; Liberal Reformist Party

Personal details
- Born: 23 February 1965 (age 61) Chișinău, Moldavian SSR, Soviet Union
- Party: Liberal Party Reform Council
- Other political affiliations: Liberal Party; Alliance for European Integration (2009–present)
- Education: Moldova State University; Saint Petersburg Polytechnical University

Oleg Bodrug (born 23 February 1965) is a Moldovan politician, vice-president of the Parliament of the Republic of Moldova, co-chair of the Liberal Reformist Party.

== Biography ==
Oleg Bodrug was born on 23 February 1965 in the city of Chisinau. He graduated from the Faculty of Physics at the State University of Moldova and the Polytechnic Institute of St. Petersburg. Oleg Bodrug is a member of Union of Journalists of Moldova and has been the director of "Prut Internaţional" Publishing house since 1992. He has been a member of the Parliament of Moldova since 2009. From 21 August 2010 to 13 April 2013 - Secretary General of the Liberal Party (PL). He joined the Liberal Party Reform Council in 2013. From 30 May 2013 - Deputy Speaker of the Parliament of the Republic of Moldova.

In the April 2009 Moldovan parliamentary electionApril 2009 elections, Oleg Bodrug is elected a deputy in the Parliament of the Republic of Moldova, reelected in July 2009 and 2010.

On 12 April 2013 Oleg Bodrug joined the Council of the Liberal Reformist Party, demanding replacing Mihai Ghimpu with Dorin Chirtoacă at the head of the Liberal Party.

On 13 April 2013 Oleg Bogrug has been excluded from the Liberal Party by the Republican Council of the Liberal Party.

On 15 December 2013, at the Congress of Constitution of the Liberal Reformist Party, Oleg Bodrug was elected co-chairman of the Liberal Reformist Party.

== Family ==
Oleg Bodrug is married and has two children.
