= Sergiu Sîrbu (politician) =

Moldovan politician (born 1980)

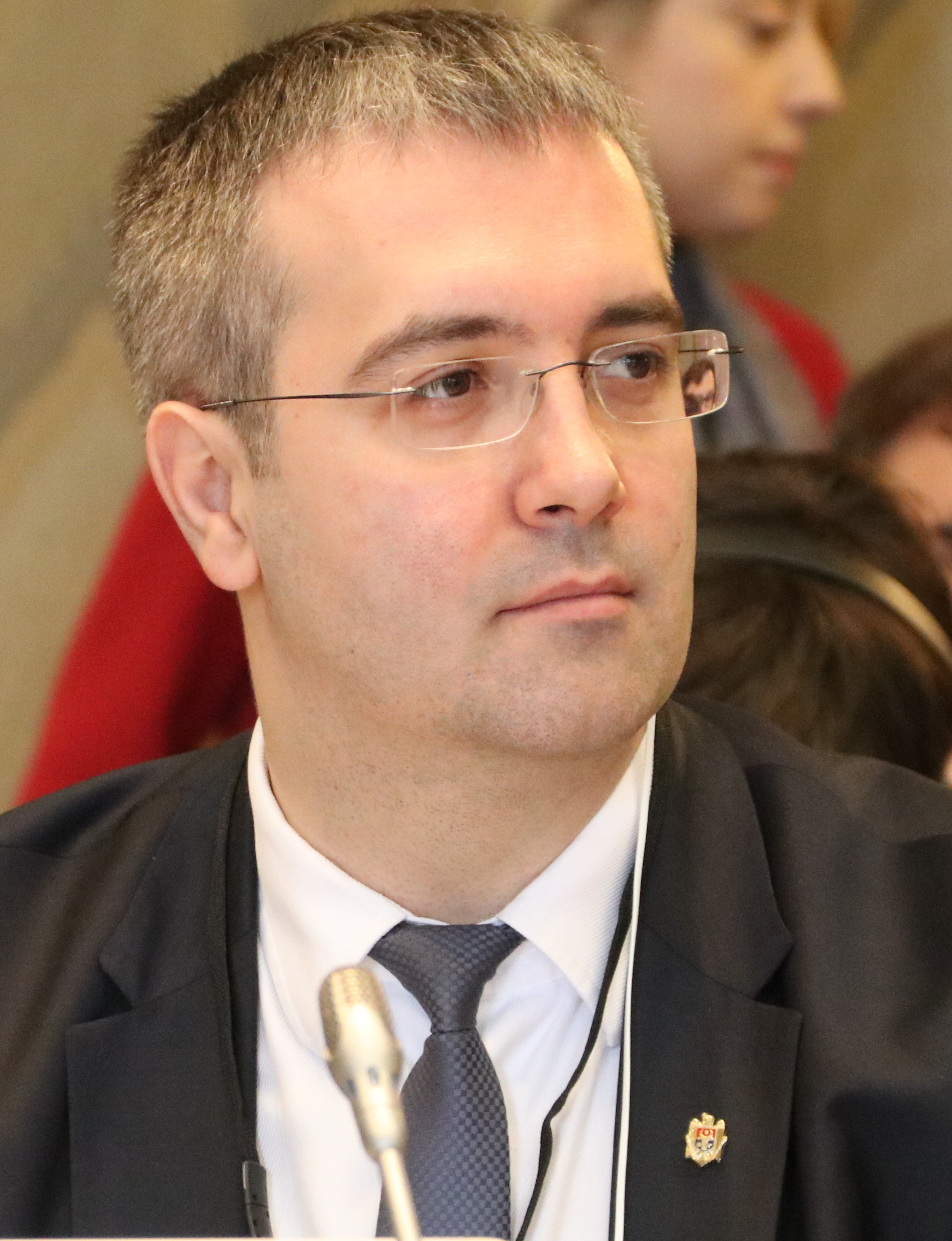
- Sîrbu in 2017

Member of the Moldovan Parliament
- In office 24 December 2010 – 23 July 2021
- Parliamentary group: Party of Communists; Democratic Party; Pro Moldova Party

Vice President of the Moldovan Parliament
- In office 11 July 2014 – 9 December 2014 Serving with: Liliana Palihovici; Oleg Bodrug
- President: Nicolae Timofti
- Prime Minister: Iurie Leancă
- Speaker: Igor Corman
- Preceded by: Andrian Candu
- Succeeded by: Vladimir Vitiuc

Personal details
- Born: Serghei Sîrbu; 28 September 1980 (age 46) Chișinău, Moldavian SSR, Soviet Union
- Party: Pro Moldova (2020 - present); Democratic Party of Moldova (2012–2020); Party of Communists of the Republic of Moldova (2000–2012)
- Spouse: Inna Verejan
- Children: Amina
- Education: State University of Moldova
- Occupation: Politician, jurist

Sergiu Sîrbu (born Serghei Sîrbu, 28 September 1980) is a Moldovan politician and jurist, who started serving in 2010 as Deputy in the Parliament of Moldova as member of the faction of Democratic Party of Moldova. On 11 July 2014, Sîrbu became Deputy President of the Parliament of Moldova. Sergiu Sîrbu was member of Party of Communists of the Republic of Moldova until 12 December 2012, when he left the party. The same year, Sîrbu is member of Democratic Party of Moldova.

On 19 February 2020 Sergiu Sîrbu, together with a group of MPs, left the faction of the Democrats and the Democratic Party. On 20 February 2020, they announced at the press conference about the establishment of the Pro Moldova parliamentary group.
