= Andrei Popov (politician) =

Moldovan politician (born 1973)

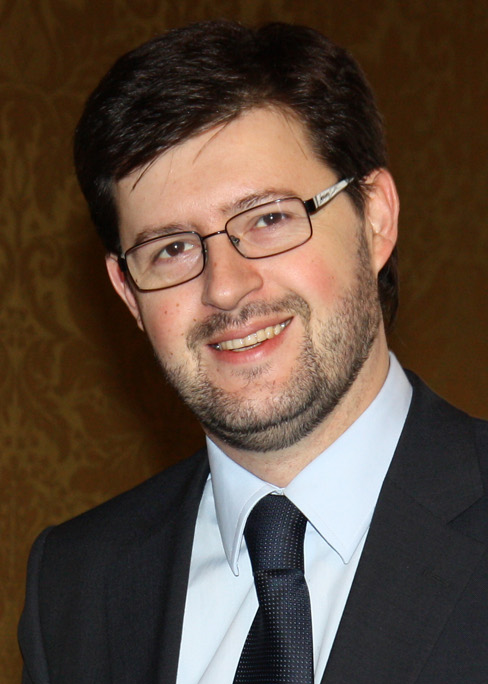
- Popov in 2011

Moldovan Ambassador to Greece and Cyprus
- In office 30 May 2022 – 16 October 2026
- President: Maia Sandu
- Prime Minister: Natalia Gavrilița; Dorin Recean; Alexandru Munteanu; Eugen Osmochescu (acting); Vasile Tofan
- Preceded by: Anatolie Vangheli
- Succeeded by: Alexandru Codreanu

Moldovan Ambassador to Austria and Slovakia
- In office 7 August 2013 – 15 March 2016
- President: Nicolae Timofti
- Prime Minister: Iurie Leancă; Chiril Gaburici; Natalia Gherman (acting); Valeriu Streleț; Gheorghe Brega (acting); Pavel Filip
- Preceded by: Valeriu Chiveri
- Succeeded by: Victor Osipov

Deputy Minister of Foreign Affairs and European Integration
- In office 20 November 2009 – 7 August 2013
- President: Mihai Ghimpu (acting); Vladimir Filat (acting); Marian Lupu (acting); Nicolae Timofti
- Prime Minister: Vladimir Filat; Iurie Leancă
- Minister: Iurie Leancă; Natalia Gherman

Member of the Moldovan Parliament
- In office 29 July 2009 – 29 December 2009
- Succeeded by: Oleg Sîrbu
- Parliamentary group: Democratic Party

Personal details
- Born: January 24, 1973 (age 53) Chișinău, Moldavian SSR, Soviet Union
- Children: 3
- Parent: Mihai Popov
- Education: University of Bucharest; National University of Political Studies and Public Administration; Geneva Centre for Security Policy

Andrei Popov (born 24 January 1973) is a Moldovan diplomat, journalist and civic activist.

== Biography ==
Andrei Popov is a Moldovan career diplomat, political analyst and journalist, President of the Moldovan Institute for Strategic Initiatives (IPIS). He is the author of the weekly TV programme "Popular Diplomacy” and co-host of the weekly political talk-show „Botan+Popov”, both on independent TV8 channel.

He is the former Member of the Parliament (2009), Deputy Minister of Foreign Affairs and European Integration (2009-2013) and Ambassador of Moldova to Austria, Slovakia, OSCE and International organisations in Vienna (2013-2016). In the later capacity, in April–August 2014, he served as the Chairperson of the OSCE's Forum for Security Cooperation (FSC). In 2016, in the middle of his ambassadorial mandate, he resigned from the diplomatic service in sign of disagreement with the policies of the ruling Democratic Party's leadership.

In 2004–2009, Popov was the executive director of the Foreign Policy Association of Moldova (APE) and founder of the Transnistrian Dialogues program. From 1997 to 2004, he served in different capacities in Moldovan diplomatic service: first in the Embassy of Moldova in Washington (1997-2001) as Second/First Secretary, then in the Foreign Ministry's General International Security Department (2001-2004) as its Deputy Director/Director.

He started his career in 1996 as Press and Information officer at the United Nations Development Program in Moldova.

== Education and awards ==
Popov studied at the Geneva Centre for Security Policy (2002-2003), Faculty of International Relations of the Bucharest National School of Political and Administrative Studies (1994-1996) and Faculty of Journalism and Communication Studies of the Bucharest University (1990-1994).

In 2014 Popov was awarded the diplomatic rank of Ambassador Extraordinary and Plenipotentiary. He is the Cavalier of the Order of the Officer's Cross of Merit of Hungary (2013), chairman of the Alumni association of the European Institute of Political Studies of Moldova (IESPM), Board member of the Association for Participative Democracy (ADEPT), alumni in the Young Munich Leaders Program (2011) and the graduate of the UK John Smith Fellowship Program (2009).
