= Vladimir Lupan =

Moldovan diplomat and journalist

Permanent Representative of Moldova to the United Nations
- In office 21 November 2011 – 5 May 2017
- President: Marian Lupu (acting); Nicolae Timofti; Igor Dodon
- Prime Minister: Vlad Filat; Iurie Leancă; Chiril Gaburici; Natalia Gherman (acting); Valeriu Streleț; Gheorghe Brega (acting); Pavel Filip
- Preceded by: Alexandru Cujbă
- Succeeded by: Victor Moraru

Member of the Moldovan Parliament
- In office 24 December 2010 – 21 November 2011
- Succeeded by: Valeriu Nemerenco
- Parliamentary group: Liberal Party

Foreign Policy Advisor to the President
- In office 16 August 2010 – 24 December 2010
- President: Mihai Ghimpu (acting)
- Preceded by: Mihai Balan

Personal details
- Born: 26 July 1971 (age 54) Chişinău, Moldavian SSR, Soviet Union
- Spouse: Rodica
- Children: Dan (1999); Sandu (2006)
- Occupation: Diplomat, Journalist

Vladimir Lupan (born 26 July 1971) is a Moldovan former politician and diplomat. He was the former ambassador, Permanent Representative of the Republic of Moldova to the United Nations. Between 2010–2011, he was a member of the Parliament of the Republic of Moldova, deputy chairman of the Liberal Party. He is a former diplomat from the Republic of Moldova. He has been the foreign policy advisor to the president of Moldova since August 2010. Vlad Lupan served for 12 years in the diplomatic service of his country and in his last posting he was the director of the NATO Department in the Ministry of the Foreign Affairs and European Integration of Moldova. Since 2008 he was a civil society expert on EU, NATO, security sector reform issues, as well as an external efficiency evaluator and, at the same time, had his show on Vocea Basarabiei radio station.

== Biography ==
Vladimir Lupan was born in 1971 in Chişinău and graduated from Moldova State University (1993) and National School of Administration and Political Science of Bucharest. As of 2008 he holds a Master of Arts degree in Journalism and Public Communication from the Free Independent University of Moldova. He worked for the Ministry of the Foreign Affairs and European Integration of Moldova as of September 1996 until 2008, and starting with 2012 he continues diplomatic activity as the Ambassador of Moldova to UN. He is a former moderator of the "Euro-Atlantic Dictionary" talkshow, on Radio Vocea Basarabiei and ex-member of the advisory board to the Ministry of Defense (Moldova). Previously a coordinator of the Civil Society "Report of the 19" experts on Moldova-EU, he wrote studies on EU-Moldova and also on foreign and domestic policies. During his work with the Ministry of Foreign Affairs he was seconded to two State Commission as a negotiator of the Transnistria conflict settlement (Joint Control Commission of the Security Zone and the commission on political negotiations of the Transnistria conflict) and also to three Organization for Security and Co-operation in Europe field Missions (Georgia/South Ossetia – Albania, Croatia). His last position with the MFA, before assuming the post of the ambassador to UN, was in 2008, as director of the NATO Department in the Ministry of Foreign Affairs. In August 2010, Vlad Lupan replaced Mihai Bălan (appointed ambassador to Greece) as foreign policy advisor to the president of Moldova. Before being appointed to his posting as the ambassador of the Republic of Moldova to UN, he served as an MP (Liberal) in the Parliament of the Republic of Moldova.

== Awards ==
- Premiul pentru patriotism, competenţă şi spirit non-conformist în afirmarea intereselor naţionale ale Republicii Moldova
