= Anatolie Vangheli =

Moldovan diplomat (born 1961)

Moldovan Ambassador to the United Arab Emirates, Bahrain and Saudi Arabia
- Incumbent
- Assumed office 31 July 2024
- President: Maia Sandu
- Prime Minister: Dorin Recean; Alexandru Munteanu; Eugen Osmochescu (acting); Vasile Tofan
- Preceded by: Victor Haruța

Moldovan Ambassador to Greece and Cyprus
- In office 29 May 2017 – 24 September 2021
- President: Igor Dodon; Maia Sandu
- Prime Minister: Pavel Filip; Maia Sandu; Ion Chicu; Aureliu Ciocoi (acting); Natalia Gavrilița
- Preceded by: Valentin Ciumac
- Succeeded by: Andrei Popov

Moldovan Ambassador to Israel
- In office 19 August 2013 – 21 April 2015
- President: Nicolae Timofti
- Prime Minister: Iurie Leancă; Chiril Gaburici
- Preceded by: Mihai Balan
- Succeeded by: Gabriela Moraru

Personal details
- Born: 27 January 1961 (age 65) Trebujeni, Moldavian SSR, Soviet Union
- Education: Alecu Russo State University of Bălți; Stendhal University; Grenoble Institute of Political Studies; Moldova State University

Anatolie Vangheli (born 27 January 1961) is a Moldovan diplomat. He is the current Moldovan ambassador to the United Arab Emirates.
