= Artur Cozma =

Moldovan politician

Minister of Culture and Tourism
- In office 19 April 2005 – 1 December 2008
- President: Vladimir Voronin
- Prime Minister: Vasile Tarlev; Zinaida Greceanîi
- Preceded by: Veaceslav Madan (as Minister of Culture)
- Succeeded by: Mihail Barbulat

Moldovan Ambassador to Israel
- In office 25 June 2001 – 19 April 2005
- President: Vladimir Voronin
- Prime Minister: Vasile Tarlev
- Preceded by: Mihai Bălan
- Succeeded by: Larisa Miculeț

Personal details
- Born: 22 April 1967 (age 58) Chișinău, Moldavian SSR, Soviet Union

Artur Cozma (born 22 April 1967) is a Moldovan politician and diplomat who served as the Minister of Culture of Moldova from 2005 until 2008.
