= Modern Democratic Party =

Moldovan political party

Modern Democratic Party Partidul Democrat Modern
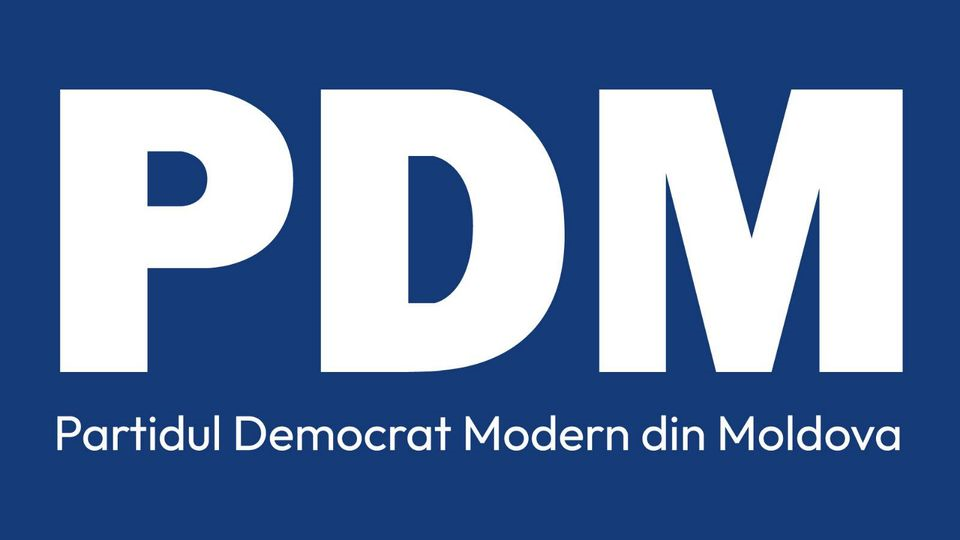
- President: Boris Foca
- Founder: Andrian Candu
- Founded: 18 June 2020; 5 years ago
- Split from: Democratic Party of Moldova
- Headquarters: 3 Vlaicu Pârcălab Street, Chișinău
- Ideology: Economic liberalism Social conservatism Anti-communism; Pro-Europeanism
- Political position: Centre-right
- Colours: Light blue Blue
- Parliament: 0 / 101
- District Presidents: 0 / 32

Website
- pdmm.md

The Modern Democratic Party (Romanian: Partidul Democrat Modern, PDM) is a centre-right political party of the Republic of Moldova. It was founded and led by Andrian Candu, the former President of the Moldovan Parliament, under the original name of Pro Moldova. Boris Foca became the leader of the party in 2021 as acting president; under him, the party was renamed to the Modern Democratic Party in 2023.

== History ==
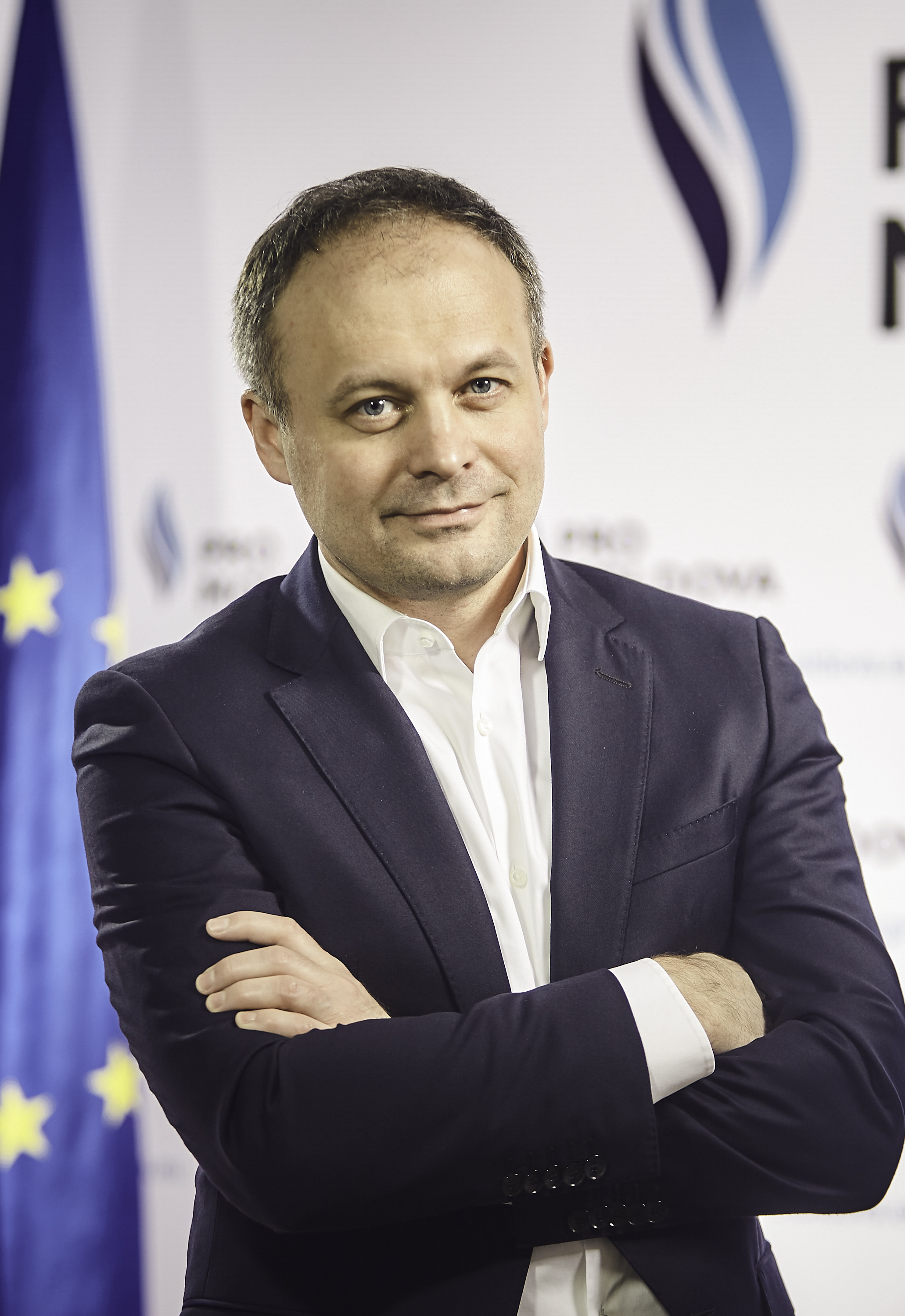
Andrian Candu, founder and former president of the Modern Democratic Party, then Pro Moldova

Logo of the Modern Democratic Party when it was known as Pro Moldova

Pro Moldova first appeared on 20 February 2020 as a parliamentary group. This happened due to internal disagreements in the Democratic Party of Moldova (PDM), which caused six deputies to leave the party. These were Andrian Candu, Sergiu Sîrbu, Vladimir Cebotari, Eleonora Graur, Grigore Repeșciuc and Corneliu Padnevici. Candu became the president of the group, while Sîrbu was appointed as the party secretary. Eight days later, on 28 February, the deputy Gheorghe Brașovschi left the PDM and joined to the group.

Months later, more deputies would join the group. The first of them was Ruxanda Glavan, who abandoned the PDM and joined to Pro Moldova on 1 May. She would be followed on 8 May by Elena Bacalu and Oleg Sîrbu, both from the PDM as well, after Candu made an appeal to the opposition to form an antigovernment alliance. Even more deputies from the PDM would join later; Vasile Bîtca and Ghenadie Verdeș did on 18 May, then Angel Agache on 9 June and Eufrosinia Grețu on 17 June.

On 22 June, Pro Moldova was registered as a political party, describing itself as "a modern centre-right party, which fights for a prosperous and fair Moldova for everyone".

In the day of 30 June, the deputy from the Party of Socialists of the Republic of Moldova (PSRM) Ștefan Gațcan joined the party due to the mismanagement of the COVID-19 pandemic in Moldova by the ruling PSRM-PDM coalition. This encountered heavy pressure from the other members of the coalition. In fact, after this, he was harassed by two socialist deputies and filed a complaint for the pressure they tried to exert on him. Following this, Gațcan disappeared, spreading rumors that he had been kidnapped. It was later found that he had withdrawn the complaint, and on 7 July, he was found in Iași, Romania. Finally, on 9 July, he went to a meeting in the Moldovan Parliament and announced that he would continue to support the PSRM-PDM coalition.

Days later, Candu said that he still considered Gațcan a deputy of Pro Moldova, as there continued to be one request from him to join the party but not one to withdraw it. Candu tried to contact Gațcan to clarify the situation to no avail, explaining that this was probably because he was not having an easy time due to the previous incidents.

On 1 September, Candu announced that he would run for the 2020 Moldovan presidential election. He also accused Igor Dodon, who was the President of Moldova at the time, of "having exceeded his powers". However, on 18 September, the Central Election Commission of Moldova rejected Candu's request to be registered for the election for failing to meet the required minimum number of signatures from each district, which was 600. Furthermore, on 3 October, the Supreme Court of Justice of Moldova declared that the appeal filed by Candu regarding this decision was "inadmissible", confirming that he could not participate in the presidential election. Candu said this was a "reconfirmation of loyalty to the regime of Dodon" by the judiciary and that "we believe it was a desperate act by the government for fear of the power of Pro Moldova."

On 29 October 2021, Candu resigned as president of Pro Moldova, with Boris Foca being elected as acting president. Candu later explained that the motivations behind his decision were that he wished to leave politics and get involved in the world of business and that the main objective of Pro Moldova, "the departure of Igor Dodon from the political scene", had already been achieved. Cebotari also resigned from his post of secretary general of the party. Both Candu and Cebotari remained members of the party. Tribuna.md reported on 14 March 2023 that Pro Moldova, led by Foca, had legally changed its name to the Modern Democratic Party (PDM). Foca said the party adopted this name once the abbreviation PDM became unoccupied, as the Democratic Party of Moldova had changed its name to the European Social Democratic Party (PSDE) on 20 November 2022. He also said the Democratic Party of Moldova was "the party in which we formed as politicians" and invited members of the old staff of the party to join the newly renamed Modern Democratic Party.

On 12 August 2025, in a press conference attended by Foca and Cebotari, it was announced that the party would run in the 2025 Moldovan parliamentary election. However, on 29 August, the Central Electoral Commission of Moldova (CEC) rejected the PDM's application to register for the election. The PDM's application had failed on 25 August to obtain enough votes from the CEC's members for its approval, with the CEC citing the exclusion of ten people from the party's list of candidates, which could generate risks of interpretation in relation to the provisions of Moldova's electoral code; and an official letter sent that day to the CEC by the director of the Public Services Agency (ASP), Mircea Eșanu, in which he reported on "potential subversive actions" by people subject to international sanctions through the party, with the ASP having decided to temporarily remove the PDM from the list of parties eligible for running at the election.

On 22 September that year, at the request of the ASP and the Security and Intelligence Service (SIS), the Ministry of Justice requested the Central Court of Appeal to limit the party's activity. On 2 October, as a temporary precautionary measure, the Court limited the PDM's activity until a final verdict was made on its case. It then decided to limit the party's activity for 12 months on 9 October.

== See also ==
- Politics of Moldova
