= Vladimir Vitiuc =

Moldovan politician (born 1972)

Member of the Moldovan Parliament
- In office 17 March 2005 – 23 July 2021
- Parliamentary group: Party of Communists; Democratic Party; Șor Party

Vice President of the Moldovan Parliament
- In office 4 December 2020 – 23 July 2021 Serving with: Vlad Batrîncea; Mihai Popșoi; Alexandru Slusari
- President: Igor Dodon; Maia Sandu
- Prime Minister: Ion Chicu; Aureliu Ciocoi (acting)
- Speaker: Zinaida Greceanîi
- Preceded by: Monica Babuc
- In office 23 January 2015 – 9 March 2019 Serving with: Liliana Palihovici; Iurie Leancă; Valeriu Ghilețchi
- President: Nicolae Timofti; Igor Dodon
- Prime Minister: Iurie Leancă; Chiril Gaburici; Natalia Gherman (acting); Valeriu Streleț; Gheorghe Brega (acting); Pavel Filip
- Speaker: Andrian Candu
- Preceded by: Sergiu Sîrbu
- Succeeded by: Monica Babuc

Personal details
- Born: 18 July 1972 (age 53) Bălți, Moldavian SSR, Soviet Union

Vladimir Vitiuc (born 18 July 1972) is a Moldovan politician. He served two terms as the Vice President of the Moldovan Parliament.

== Notes ==
- https://www.parlament.md/StructuraParlamentului/Deputa%C8%9Bii/tabid/87/Id/103/language/en-US/Default.aspx
