= Olaru =

Olaru, meaning "potter", is a Romanian surname and may refer to:

- Costică Olaru (born 1960), Romanian canoer
- Dan Olaru (born 1996), Moldovan archer
- Darius Olaru (born 1998), Romanian footballer
- Maria Olaru (born 1982), Romanian gymnast
- Nicolae Olaru (born 1958), Moldovan politician
- Nuța Olaru (born 1970), Romanian runner
- Raluca Olaru (born 1989), Romanian tennis player
