= Agache =

Agache is a surname. Notable people with the surname include:

- Alexandru Agache (born 1955), Romanian baritone
- Alfred Agache (architect) (1875–1959), Brazilian urban planner
- Alfred Agache (painter) (1843–1915), French painter
- Angel Agache (born 1976), Moldovan politician
- Dragoș Agache (born 1984), Romanian swimmer
- Lavinia Agache (born 1968), Romanian gymnast
- Roger Agache (1926–2011), French archaeologist

Agache may also refer to:

- A tributary of the Sensée in northern France

See also

- Agacher Strip War, border dispute between Burkina Faso and Mali - similar name
