= Liliana Palihovici =

Moldovan politician (born 1971)

Liliana Palihovici OR
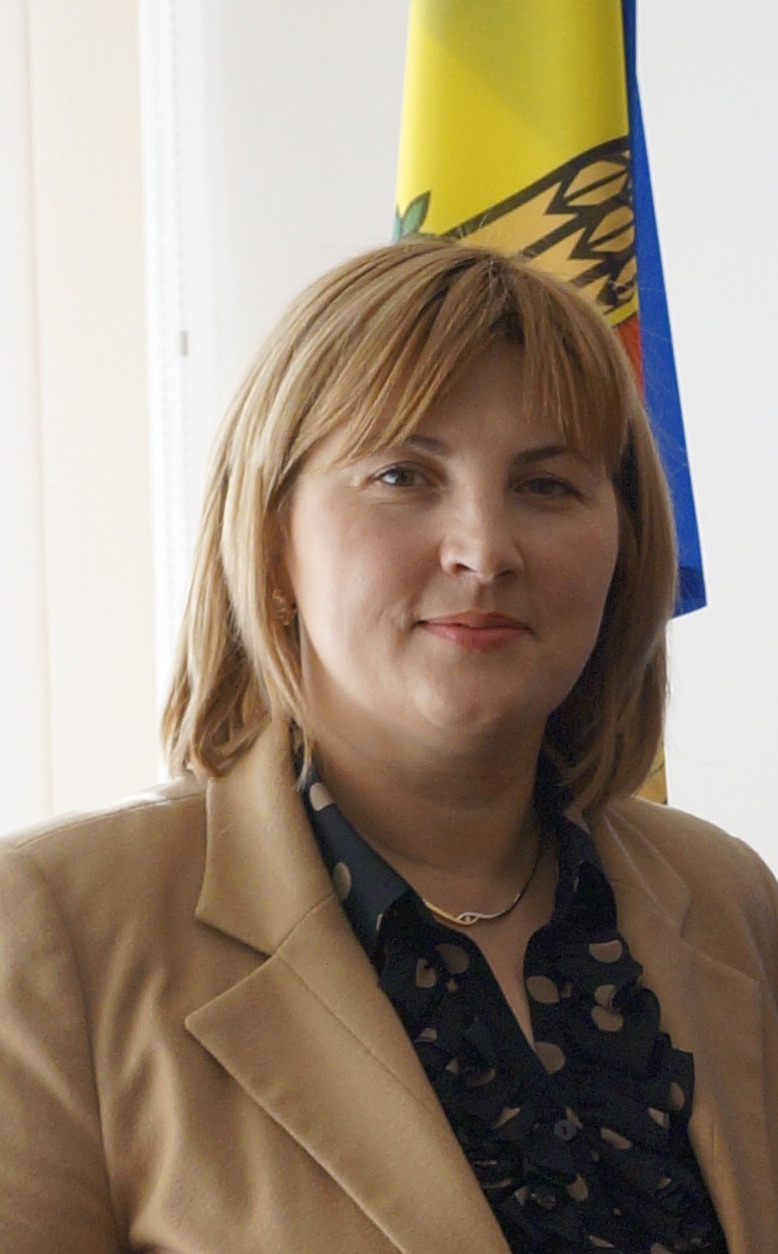
- Palihovici in 2014

Acting President of the Moldovan Parliament
- In office 25 April 2013 – 30 May 2013
- President: Nicolae Timofti
- Prime Minister: Iurie Leancă
- Preceded by: Marian Lupu
- Succeeded by: Igor Corman

Vice President of the Moldovan Parliament
- In office 30 December 2010 – 28 April 2017 Serving with: Oleg Bodrug; Andrian Candu; Sergiu Sîrbu; Vladimir Vitiuc
- President: Marian Lupu (acting); Nicolae Timofti; Igor Dodon
- Prime Minister: Vlad Filat; Iurie Leancă; Chiril Gaburici; Natalia Gherman (acting); Valeriu Streleț; Gheorghe Brega (acting); Pavel Filip
- Speaker: Marian Lupu; Igor Corman; Andrian Candu
- Preceded by: Iurie Țap
- Succeeded by: Iurie Leancă

Member of the Moldovan Parliament
- In office 22 April 2009 – 28 April 2017
- Succeeded by: Nicolae Olaru
- Parliamentary group: Liberal Democratic Party

Personal details
- Born: 26 November 1971 (age 54) Horodişte, Moldavian SSR, Soviet Union
- Party: Liberal Democratic Party; Alliance for European Integration (2009–2017)
- Spouse: Sergiu Palihovici
- Children: 2
- Education: Moldova State University
- Profession: Politician, historian

Liliana Palihovici (born 26 November 1971) is a Moldovan politician.

She has been a member of the Parliament of Moldova from 2009 until 2017.
