= Valeriu Ghilețchi =

Moldovan Baptist clergyman and politician

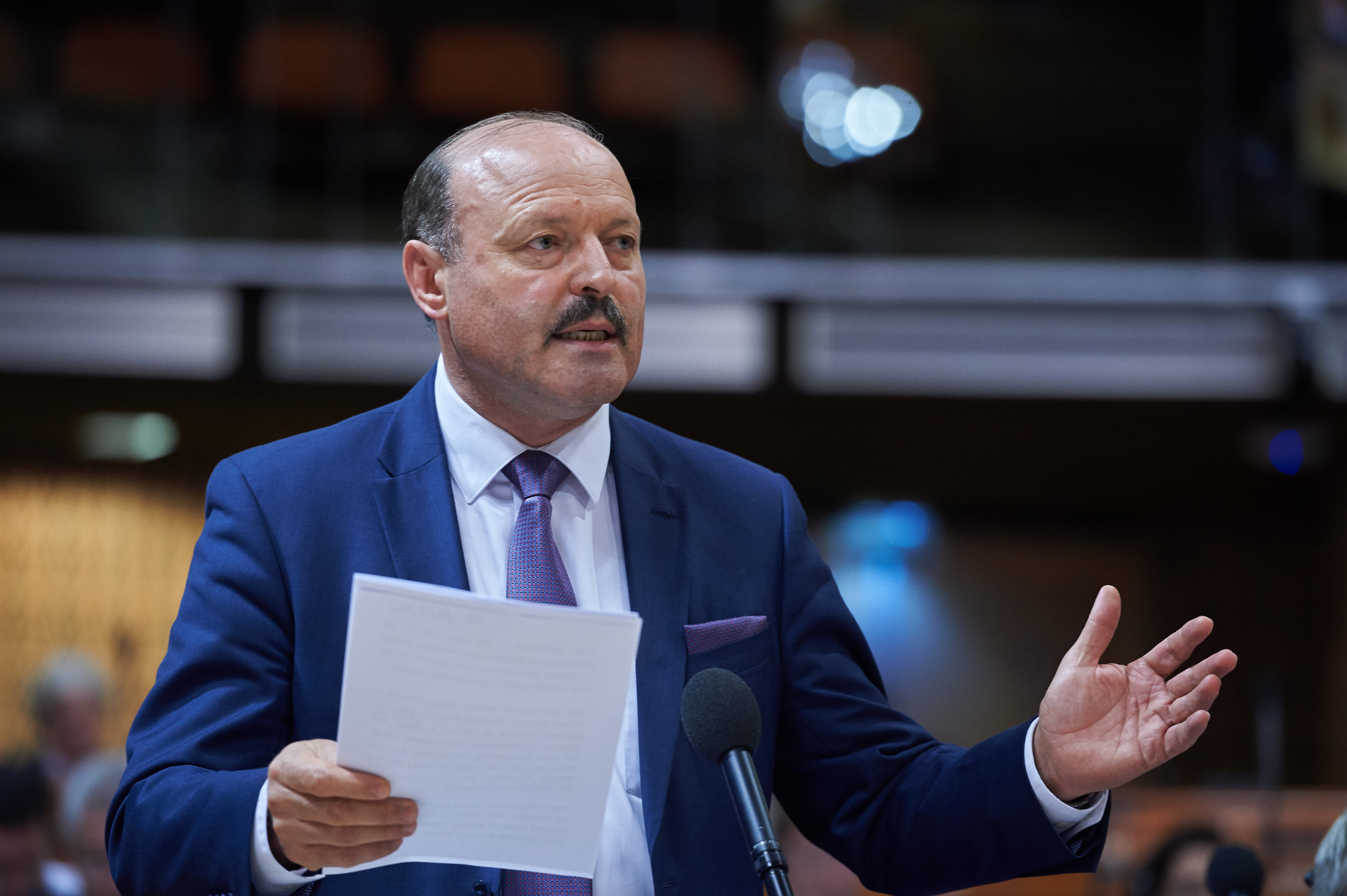
- Ghilețchi in 2018

President of the European Christian Political Party
- Incumbent
- Assumed office 15 October 2021
- Preceded by: Branislav Škripek

Vice President of the Moldovan Parliament
- In office 23 December 2017 – 9 March 2019 Serving with: Vladimir Vitiuc
- President: Igor Dodon
- Prime Minister: Pavel Filip
- Speaker: Andrian Candu
- Preceded by: Iurie Leancă
- Succeeded by: Ion Ceban

Member of the Moldovan Parliament
- In office 22 April 2009 – 9 March 2019
- Parliamentary group: Liberal Democratic Party; European People's Party
- In office 21 April 1998 – 20 March 2001
- Parliamentary group: Party of Democratic Forces

Personal details
- Born: July 8, 1960 (age 65) Pînzăreni, Moldavian SSR, Soviet Union
- Party: Romanian National Conservative Party
- Other political affiliations: Liberal Democratic Party; Alliance for European Integration (2009–present)
- Spouse: Marina
- Children: Two sons and a daughter

Valeriu Ghilețchi (born 8 July 1960) is a Moldovan-Romanian Baptist clergyman and politician.

== Biography ==
Originally working as an engineer, Ghilețchi was ordained Baptist pastor in 1996 following a program of theological studies at Emmanuel Baptist University in Oradea, Romania. He holds an undergraduate diploma in theology.

Since 1994, he served as rector of the Holy Trinity Moldovan Baptist Institute and then as Academic Dean of the College of Theology and Education in Chișinău, Rep. Moldova.

He served two periods as bishop of the Union of Christian Evangelical Baptist Churches of Moldova.

Currently Ghilețchi is associate pastor at Jesus the Savior Baptist Church in Chișinău, Rep. Moldova.

Valeriu Ghilețchi was vice-president of the European Baptist Federation (EBF) from 2007 to 2009 and has been the president of EBF in 2009–2011.

He is a member of the parliament of Moldova. Previously affiliated with Liberal Democratic Party of Moldova (PLDM) of Vlad Filat, Ghilețchi changed his party affiliation to People's European Party (PPE) of Iurie Leancă.

He is a member of the Parliamentary Assembly of the Council of Europe since January 2010 (after a first term between 1998 and 2001). In this capacity, he served as Chair of the Social Affairs Committee. He was also the rapporteur on "Fighting Child Sex Tourism" and a member of the Parliamentary Network of Contact Parliamentarians to stop sexual violence against children for Moldova.

Ghiletchi is president of European Christian Political Party and is since 2024 Spitzenkandidat of ECPM.
