= Igor Corman =

President of the Moldovan Parliament from 2013 to 2014

Igor Corman OR
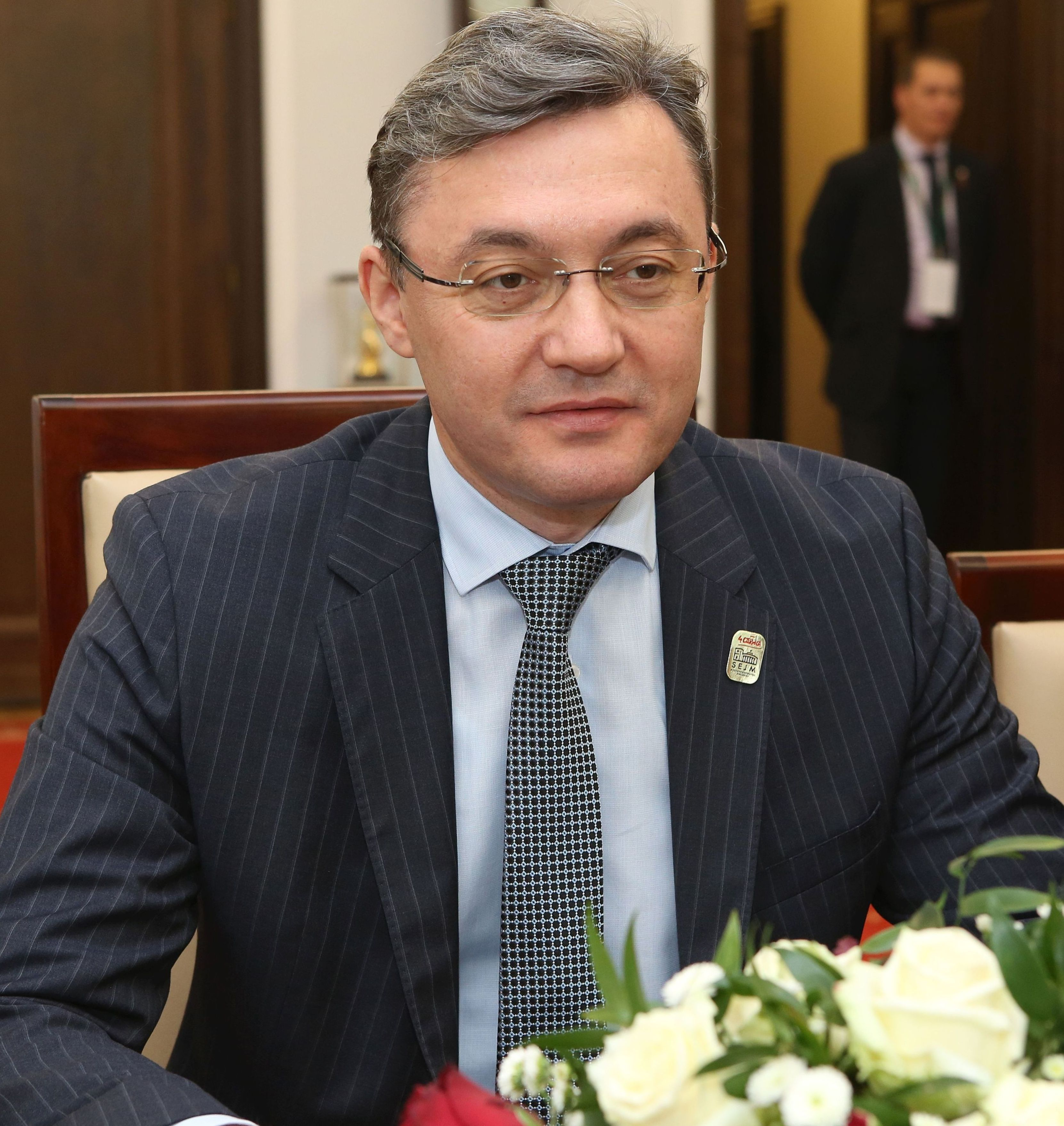
- Corman in 2014

10th President of the Moldovan Parliament
- In office 30 May 2013 – 28 December 2014
- President: Nicolae Timofti
- Prime Minister: Iurie Leancă
- Deputy: See list: Liliana Palihovici Oleg Bodrug Andrian Candu Sergiu Sîrbu
- Preceded by: Liliana Palihovici (acting)
- Succeeded by: Andrian Candu

Member of the Moldovan Parliament
- In office 14 August 2009 – 15 October 2015
- Succeeded by: Iurie Cazacu
- Parliamentary group: Democratic Party

Moldovan Ambassador to Germany and Denmark
- In office 12 December 2003 – 30 April 2009
- President: Vladimir Voronin
- Prime Minister: Vasile Tarlev; Zinaida Greceanîi
- Preceded by: Nicolae Tăbăcaru
- Succeeded by: Aureliu Ciocoi

1st Moldovan Ambassador to Sweden and Norway
- In office 24 February 2005 – 24 March 2006
- President: Vladimir Voronin
- Prime Minister: Vasile Tarlev
- Succeeded by: Natalia Gherman

Personal details
- Born: 17 December 1969 (age 56) Ciulucani, Moldavian SSR, Soviet Union
- Party: Democratic Party; Alliance for European Integration (2009–2015)
- Children: 2
- Education: Moldova State University; Alexandru Ioan Cuza University; LMU Munich

Igor Corman (born 17 December 1969) is a Moldovan politician and diplomat, President of the Moldovan Parliament from 30 May 2013 until 29 December 2014.

== Early life ==
Igor Corman was born on 17 December 1969 in the village of Ciulucani, in Telenești District, in the Republic of Moldova. Former Komsomol member.

== Education ==
Igor Corman graduated from the Faculty of History of the State University of Chișinău, Moldova (1990) and then the Faculty of History of Al.I.Cuza University of Iași, Romania (1992). In the years 1992-1994 he completed doctoral studies at Al.I.Cuza University of Iași, Romania, and later, in 1994–1995, post-doctoral studies at LMU Munich in Germany.

In 1996, Igor Corman received his PhD in History.

In 1997, Igor Corman continued his professional training at the George Marshall College in Garmisch-Partenkirchen, Germany, and in 2002 he lectured the peacekeeping courses at Newport in the United States.

== Career ==
After graduating from the educational institutions, since 1995 Igor Corman has worked in the Ministry of Foreign Affairs of Moldova. Thus, between 1995 and 1997 he worked as secretary III, secretary II and secretary I in the Directorate for Policy Analysis and Planning of the Ministry. During the period 1997-2001 he served as secretary III, secretary II, secretary I - responsible for political relations and charged with business in the Embassy of the Republic of Moldova in Germany. Between 2001 and 2003, he worked as Director of the General Department for Europe and North America at the Ministry of Foreign Affairs.

In the period 2004–2009, Igor Corman continued his diplomatic career as Ambassador of the Republic of Moldova to Germany, by joining the Kingdom of Denmark.

Since 29 July 2009 Igor Corman is deputy to the Parliament of the Republic of Moldova from the Democratic Party of Moldova and holds the post of President of the Foreign Policy and European Integration Commission. From 30 May 2013 until 29 December 2014 he was the President of the Parliament of the Republic of Moldova. On 15 October 2015 he announced at the parliamentary session that he was giving up his mandate and withdrawing from politics in order to get involved in a project with foreign investment.

Besides Romanian and Russian, Igor Corman speaks fluently German and English. He is married and has two children.

== Distinctions and decorations ==
In 2006, Igor Corman was decorated with the "Civic Merit" Medal by the President of the Republic of Moldova, Vladimir Voronin, and in 2009 - with the Order of the "Grand Cross of Merit"by the President of Germany.

On 24 July 2014, Igor Corman was awarded the "Order of the Republic" by the President of the Republic of Moldova, Nicolae Timofti, "for decisive contributions to the accomplishment of the major foreign policy objective of the Republic of Moldova - political association and economic integration with the European Union".

== Gallery ==
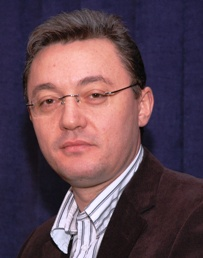
