= Mihai Balan =

Moldovan diplomat

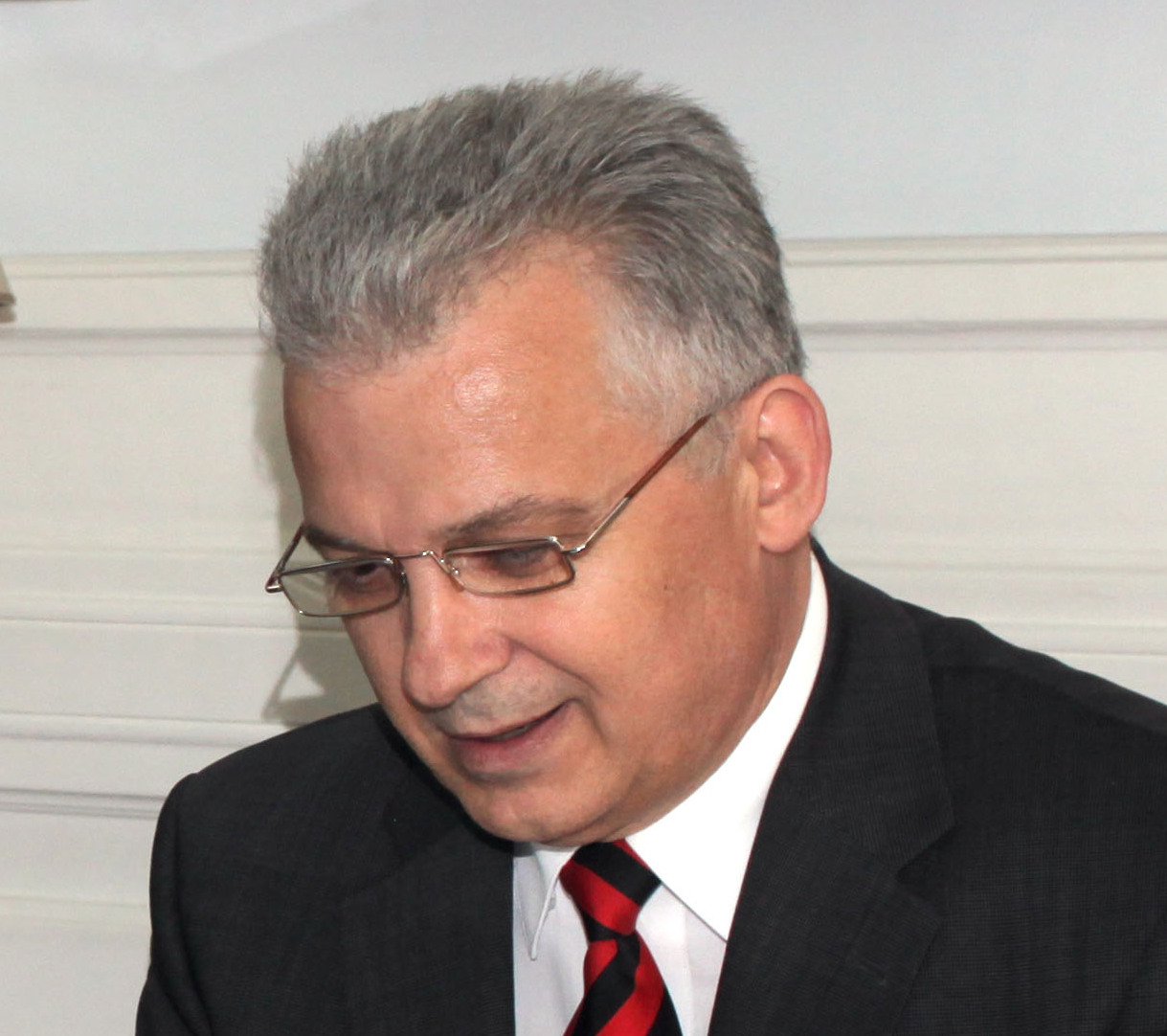
- Balan in 2011

Director of the Security and Intelligence Service
- In office 25 October 2012 – December 2017
- Preceded by: Gheorghe Mihai
- Succeeded by: Vitalie Pîrlog

Moldovan Ambassador to Israel
- In office 16 December 2011 – 14 November 2012
- President: Marian Lupu (acting); Nicolae Timofti
- Prime Minister: Vladimir Filat
- Preceded by: Larisa Miculeț
- Succeeded by: Anatolie Vangheli
- In office 18 August 1995 – 22 February 2001
- President: Mircea Snegur; Petru Lucinschi
- Prime Minister: Andrei Sangheli; Ion Ciubuc; Ion Sturza; Dumitru Braghiș
- Succeeded by: Artur Cozma

Moldovan Ambassador to Greece and Cyprus
- In office 16 August 2010 – 6 December 2011
- President: Mihai Ghimpu (acting); Vladimir Filat (acting); Marian Lupu (acting)
- Prime Minister: Vladimir Filat
- Preceded by: Ion Ursu
- Succeeded by: Valentin Ciumac

Foreign Policy and European Integration Advisor to the President
- In office 14 December 2009 – 16 August 2010
- President: Mihai Ghimpu (acting)
- Preceded by: Tudor Vasilica
- Succeeded by: Vlad Lupan

Personal details
- Born: 15 February 1954 (age 72) Trebujeni, Moldavian SSR, Soviet Union
- Children: Dan Balan

Mihai Balan (born 15 February 1954) is a Moldovan diplomat. He was the ambassador of the Republic of Moldova to Israel in January–October 2012, and prior to this was ambassador of Moldova to Greece and Cyprus (2010 – 2011). Bălan was the Foreign Policy Advisor to the President of Moldova (December 15, 2009 - August 2010).

== Early life and education ==
Mihai Balan was born on 15 February 1954 in the village Trebujeni, Orhei district, Moldavian SSR of the Soviet Union. In 1972–1974, carried out the compulsory military service. In 1974–1979, he studied at the Moldova State University, Faculty of Philology (Romanian language and literature, Journalism specialty).

== Career ==
From 1979 to 1980, he was the deputy chairperson of the Trade Union Committee of the Moldova State University, then, in 1980-1984 he was the chairperson of the trade union committee. In the same years (1980-1984), he was a lecturer at the journalism faculty of the Moldova State University in Chișinău. Between 1984 and 1990, he was a councilor and head of division within the Party (in Chișinău).

From 1990 to 1994, he worked at the Ministry of Foreign Affairs of the Republic of Moldova:

- 1990-1992 - Head of the Division at the Financial and Administrative Directorate,
- 1992-1993 - Deputy Head of the Consular Department,
- 1993-1994 - Head of the Consular Department.

In 1992, he held the diplomatic courses at the Ministry of Foreign Affairs of Romania, and in 1994, he held diplomatic courses at the Ministry of Foreign Affairs of Japan. From 1994 to 1995 he worked as a Business Advisor, at the Embassy of the Republic of Moldova in Israel, and from 1995 to 2001, he was Extraordinary and Plenipotentiary Ambassador of the Republic of Moldova in Israel. In 2001 by 2005, Mihai Bălan returned to the Ministry of Foreign Affairs, being head of the Consular General Directorate. From January to May 2002, he studied at the George Marshal Center for Security Studies, Garmisch, Germany. Between 2006 and 2008, he worked in the private sector. From 2009 until 2010 he was the Counselor of the President of the Republic of Moldova Mihai Ghimpu on issues related to the foreign policy and European integration. In the period 2010 to 2011, he worked as Extraordinary and Plenipotentiary Ambassador of the Republic of Moldova at the Hellenic Republic and the Republic of Cyprus, Vlad Lupan replaced him as Foreign Policy Advisor to the President of Moldova. In January–October 2012 he served as Ambassador Extraordinary and Plenipotentiary of the Republic of Moldova in Israel. On 25 October 2012, by the Decision of the Parliament of the Republic of Moldova Nr. 224, with the vote of 60 MPs, was appointed as the Director of the Information and Security Service of the Republic of Moldova.

== Personal life ==
Mihai Bălan is married to television star Ludmila Bălan, with whom he has two children: the singer Dan Bălan and television presenter Sanda Bălan. Besides the fact that his mother's native language is Romanian, Mihai Bălan also speaks English and Russian.
