= Ciulucani =

- Commune and village
- Location in Moldova
- Coordinates: 47°30′N 28°21′E
- Country: Moldova
- District: Telenești District

Population (2014 census)
  - Total: 1,264
- Time zone: UTC+2 (EET)
  - Summer (DST): UTC+3 (EEST)

Ciulucani is a village in Telenești District, Moldova.

== Notable people ==
- Igor Corman
