= Jana Costachi =

Moldovan lawyer and diplomat (born 1966)

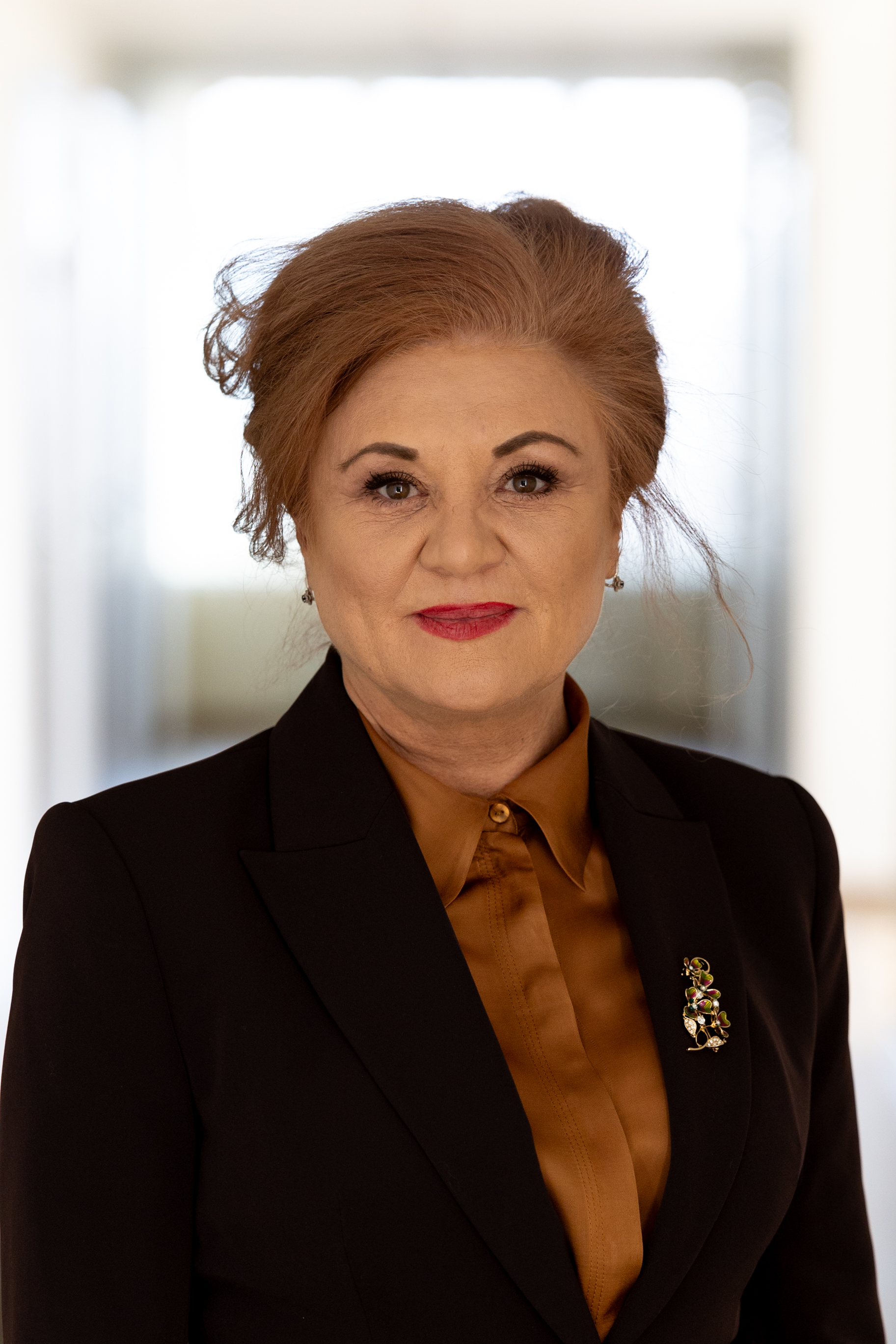
- Costachi in 2025

Moldovan Ambassador to the Republic of Ireland
- In office 14 March 2025 – 15 May 2026
- President: Maia Sandu
- Prime Minister: Dorin Recean; Alexandru Munteanu
- Preceded by: Larisa Miculeț
- Succeeded by: Larisa Miculeț (acting)

Secretary of State of the Ministry of Internal Affairs
- In office 19 August 2021 – 3 July 2024
- President: Maia Sandu
- Prime Minister: Natalia Gavrilița; Dorin Recean
- Minister: Ana Revenco; Adrian Efros

Deputy Minister of Labour, Social Protection and Family
- In office 15 June 1998 – 27 December 1999
- President: Petru Lucinschi
- Prime Minister: Ion Ciubuc; Ion Sturza
- Minister: Vladimir Gurițenco; Valerian Revenco

Personal details
- Born: 16 October 1966 (age 59) Hîncești, Moldavian SSR, Soviet Union
- Education: Moldova State University; University of Bucharest

Jana Costachi (born 16 October 1966) is a Moldovan lawyer. She most recently served as the Moldovan Ambassador to the Republic of Ireland.
