= Popeasca =

- Village
- Location in Moldova
- Coordinates: 46°36′N 29°32′E
- Country: Moldova
- District: Ștefan Vodă District
- Elevation: 430 ft (131 m)

Population (2014 census)
  - Total: 2,383
- Time zone: UTC+2 (EET)
  - Summer (DST): UTC+3 (EEST)
- Postal code: MD-4228
- Area code: +373 242

Popeasca is a village in Ștefan Vodă District, Moldova.

== Notable people ==
- Victor Osipov
