= Eugen Carpov =

Moldovan diplomat and politician (born 1966)

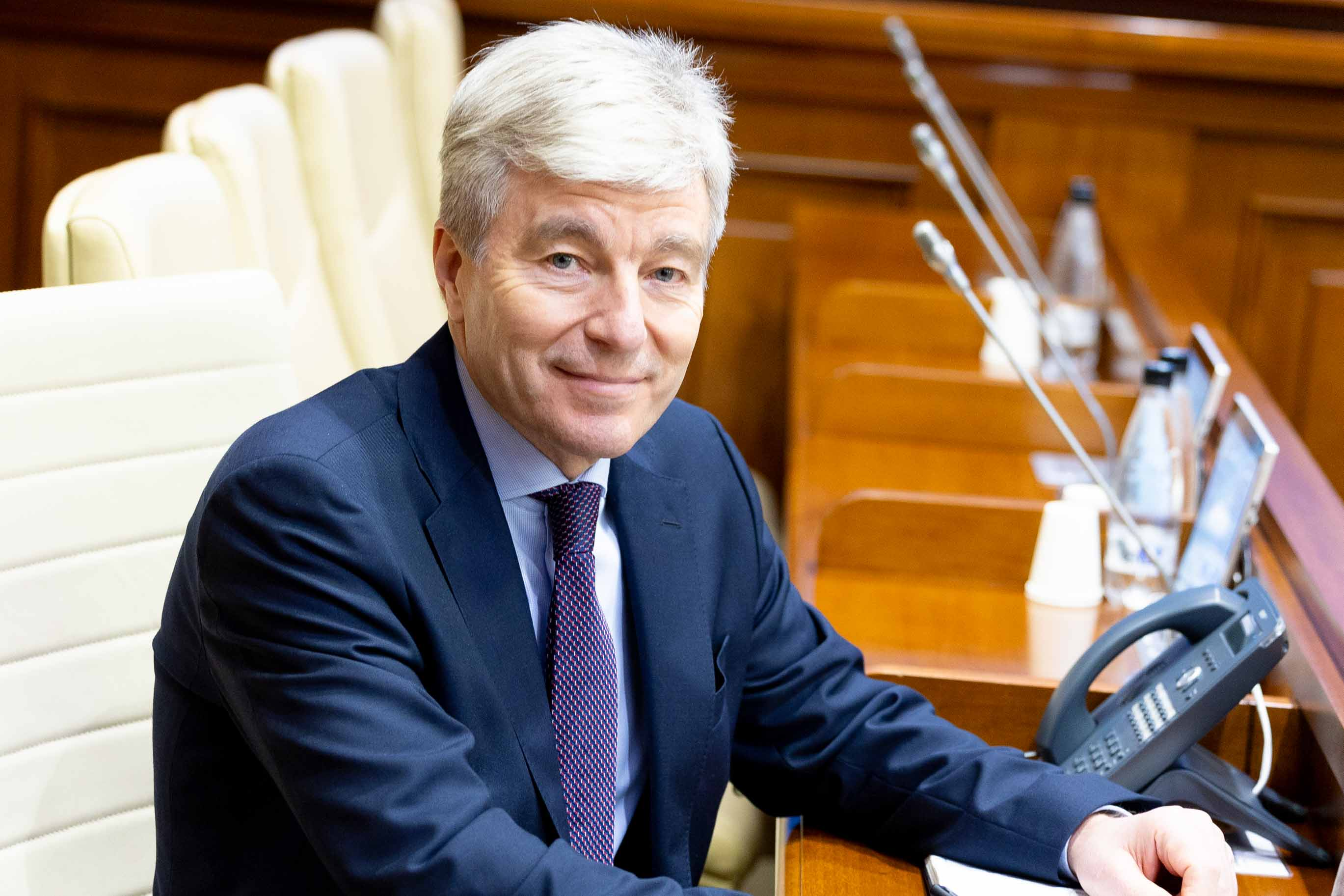
- Carpov in 2025

Member of the Moldovan Parliament
- In office 9 December 2014 – 9 March 2019
- Parliamentary group: Liberal Democratic Party; European People's Party

Deputy Prime Minister of Moldova for Reintegration
- In office 14 January 2011 – 18 February 2015
- President: Marian Lupu (acting); Nicolae Timofti
- Prime Minister: Vlad Filat; Iurie Leancă
- Preceded by: Victor Osipov
- Succeeded by: Victor Osipov

Moldovan Ambassador and Head of the Mission to the European Union
- In office 7 February 2005 – 2 March 2007
- President: Vladimir Voronin
- Prime Minister: Vasile Tarlev
- Preceded by: Ion Căpățină
- Succeeded by: Daniela Cujbă

Moldovan Ambassador to Poland
- In office 18 December 2001 – 14 January 2005
- President: Vladimir Voronin
- Prime Minister: Vasile Tarlev
- Preceded by: Gheorghe Gusac
- Succeeded by: Boris Gămurari

Deputy Minister of Foreign Affairs
- In office 7 October 1999 – 26 December 2001
- President: Petru Lucinschi; Vladimir Voronin
- Prime Minister: Ion Sturza; Dumitru Braghiș; Vasile Tarlev
- Minister: Nicolae Tăbăcaru; Nicolae Cernomaz; Nicolae Dudău

Personal details
- Born: 22 April 1966 (age 60) Ungheni, Moldavian SSR, Soviet Union
- Party: European People's Party of Moldova (2015→)
- Children: 2
- Education: National School of Administration and Political Science of Bucharest, postgraduate studies
- Profession: Diplomat

Eugen Carpov (born 22 April 1966) is a diplomat and politician from Moldova. He was the Deputy Prime Minister for Reintegration of the Republic of Moldova from 14 January 2011 to 10 December 2014 (Second Vlad Filat Cabinet).

Between 2002 and 2005 he was Ambassador of the Republic of Moldova in Poland, and between 2005 and 2007 he was Ambassador and Head of Mission of the Mission of the Republic of Moldova to the European Union.

On 27 February 2015 Eugen Carpov announced that he was leaving the LDPM faction in parliament, remaining an independent deputy. In the Leancă Cabinet he was a technocrat Deputy Prime Minister, not formally affiliated politically. Also, in the 2014 parliamentary elections in the Republic of Moldova, he was included in the list of LDPM candidates on the 9th position, becoming a deputy in the newly elected parliament, but not being a party member.
