= Victor Osipov =

Moldovan politician (born 1971)

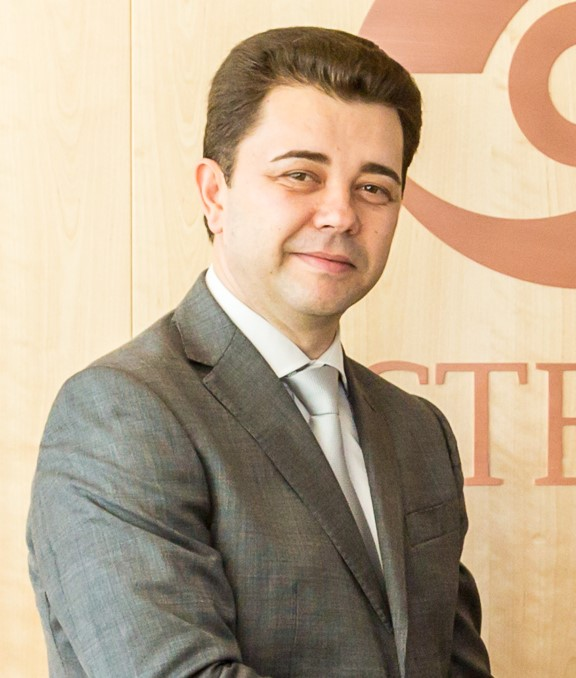
- Osipov in 2017

Moldovan Ambassador to Austria, Slovakia and OSCE
- In office 3 May 2017 – 1 June 2020
- President: Igor Dodon
- Prime Minister: Pavel Filip; Maia Sandu; Ion Chicu
- Preceded by: Andrei Popov
- Succeeded by: Mihaela Mocanu

Deputy Prime Minister of Moldova for Reintegration
- In office 18 February 2015 – 20 January 2016
- President: Nicolae Timofti
- Prime Minister: Chiril Gaburici; Natalia Gherman (acting); Valeriu Streleț; Gheorghe Brega (acting)
- Preceded by: Eugen Carpov
- Succeeded by: Gheorghe Bălan
- In office 25 September 2009 – 14 January 2011
- President: Mihai Ghimpu (acting); Vladimir Filat (acting); Marian Lupu (acting)
- Prime Minister: Vladimir Filat
- Succeeded by: Eugen Carpov

Member of the Moldovan Parliament
- In office 22 April 2009 – 29 July 2009
- Parliamentary group: Our Moldova Alliance

Personal details
- Born: 8 October 1971 (age 54) Popeasca, Moldavian SSR, Soviet Union
- Party: Party Alliance Our Moldova; Alliance for European Integration (2009–present)
- Children: 3
- Profession: Journalist

Victor Osipov (born 8 October 1971) is a Moldovan politician who from 18 February 2015 until 20 January 2016, served as Deputy Prime Minister for Reintegration of the Republic of Moldova, being the second time in this post after the 2009–2011 mandate in the Filat Government. He was the Deputy Prime Minister in charge of Moldova's territorial re-integration in the First Vlad Filat Cabinet.

Victor Osipov was the first vice-president of the Party Alliance Our Moldova (2009–2011).

== Biography ==
Victor Osipov was born on 8 October 1971 in the village of Popeasca, Ștefan Vodă District.

== Education ==
He graduated in 1993 from the Faculty of Journalism and Communication Sciences of the State University of Moldova and in 2008 from the European Institute of Political Studies of the Republic of Moldova.

== Professional activity ==
- 1992 to 1995 – editor, commentator, head of the division of the "Radio Moldova International".
- 1996 to 2000 – Director of Radio d'Or of the OWH Association.
- 2000 to 2003 – Director of the Municipal Television "Euro TV Chişinău".
- 2001 to 2004 – Executive Director of the APEL Electronic Press Association.

== Political activity ==
In 2005, he became the councillor to the Our Moldova Alliance parliamentary faction and held office by 2009. At the parliamentary elections held in April 2009, he was elected an MP from the lists of the Our Moldova Alliance.

By the Decree of the President of the Republic of Moldova no. 4-V of 25 September 2009, he was appointed Deputy Prime Minister of the Republic of Moldova.

At the VIIIth Congress of "Our Moldova" Alliance, held on 12 December 2009, Victor Osipov was elected as the first deputy chairperson of the party.

In 2010, he participated at the parliament elections with the Our Moldova Alliance (No. 2 in the list). The Alliance did not exceed the 4% electoral threshold, accruing only 2.05% of the votes validly cast.

On 9 March 2011, Osipov announced his withdrawal from the political activity, implicitly, from the position of first deputy chairperson of AMN ("Our Moldova" Alliance). In over a month the party "Our Moldova" merged with the Liberal Democratic Party of Moldova.

On 2 July 2014, he became the manager of the election campaign of the Democratic Party of Moldova for the parliamentary elections in the autumn 2014.

Since 18 February 2015, he serves as Deputy Prime Minister of the Republic of Moldova in the Gaburici Cabinet and then in the Streleț Cabinet.
