= Pînzăreni =

- Commune
- Location in Moldova
- Coordinates: 47°37′N 27°40′E
- Country: Moldova
- District: Fălești District

Population (2014)
  - Total: 1,298
- Time zone: UTC+2 (EET)
  - Summer (DST): UTC+3 (EEST)

Pînzăreni is a commune in Fălești District, Moldova. It is composed of two villages, Pînzăreni and Pînzărenii Noi.

== Notable people ==
- Valeriu Ghilețchi
