= Andrian Candu =

President of the Moldovan Parliament from 2015 to 2019

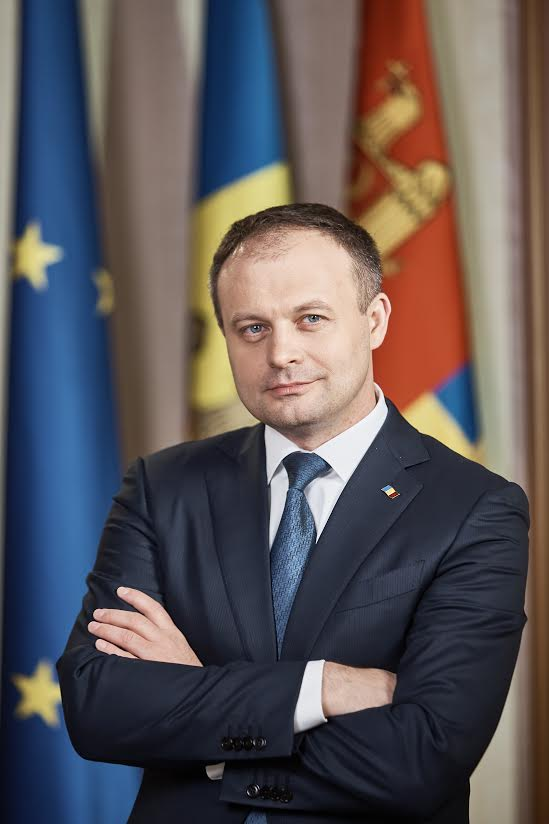
- Official portrait, 2017

11th President of the Moldovan Parliament
- In office 23 January 2015 – 9 March 2019
- President: Nicolae Timofti; Igor Dodon
- Prime Minister: Iurie Leancă; Chiril Gaburici; Natalia Gherman (acting); Valeriu Streleț; Gheorghe Brega (acting); Pavel Filip
- Deputy: See list: Liliana Palihovici Vladimir Vitiuc Iurie Leancă Valeriu Ghilețchi
- Preceded by: Igor Corman
- Succeeded by: Zinaida Greceanîi

President of Pro Moldova Party
- In office 18 June 2020 – 29 October 2021
- Succeeded by: Boris Foca (acting)

Member of the Moldovan Parliament
- In office 9 December 2014 – 23 July 2021
- Parliamentary group: Democratic Party; Pro Moldova Party
- In office 28 November 2010 – 11 July 2014
- Succeeded by: Dumitru Godoroja
- Parliamentary group: Democratic Party

Deputy Prime Minister of Moldova
- In office 11 July 2014 – 23 January 2015 Serving with: Natalia Gherman
- President: Nicolae Timofti
- Prime Minister: Iurie Leancă
- Preceded by: Valeriu Lazăr
- Succeeded by: Stéphane Christophe Bridé

Minister of Economy
- In office 11 July 2014 – 23 January 2015
- President: Nicolae Timofti
- Prime Minister: Iurie Leancă
- Preceded by: Valeriu Lazăr
- Succeeded by: Stéphane Christophe Bridé

Vice President of the Moldovan Parliament
- In office 30 May 2013 – 11 July 2014 Serving with: Liliana Palihovici; Oleg Bodrug
- President: Nicolae Timofti
- Prime Minister: Iurie Leancă
- Speaker: Igor Corman
- Succeeded by: Sergiu Sîrbu

Personal details
- Born: Andrian Candu; 27 November 1975 (age 50) Chișinău, Moldavian SSR, Soviet Union
- Citizenship: Moldova; Romania
- Spouse: Zuzana Candu (m. 2009)
- Children: Daniel; Vera; Adam
- Education: Babeș-Bolyai University; Vienna University of Economics and Business
- Occupation: Managing Partner | BizMatters Consulting Projects Development Director | Meta Soft Innovations
- Profession: Businessman
- Website: bizmatters.eu | meta-soft.eu

Andrian Candu (born 27 November 1975) is a former Moldovan politician, who served as President of the Parliament of the Republic of Moldova between 2015 and 2019. He left political life and went back to consultancy business, being focused on advisory and business project development, where previously he has built a successful career. Candu served as Vice President of the Parliament of the Republic of Moldova from 30 May 2013 to 11 July 2014, Deputy Prime Minister, Minister of Economy of the Republic of Moldova from 2 July 2014 – 23 January 2015, President of the Parliament Of the Republic of Moldova between 23 January 2015 – 24 February 2019, deputy of the PDM faction in the Parliament of the Republic of Moldova in 3 consecutive legislatures: 24 December 2010 – 11 July 2014, 9 December 2014 - 9 March 2019, 9 March 2019 – 19 February 2020. On 20 February 2020, together with five Members of the Parliament, Andrian Candu formed the Pro Moldova Parliamentary Group, which was later registered as a political party, which he chaired for 1.5 years.

== Biography ==
Candu was born on 27 November 1975 in Chișinău, Moldova. After Candu finished his secondary education at school No. 25, currently Lyceum "Onisifor Ghibu", Chişinău, in 1991 he was enrolled at the School of Informatics "Tiberiu Popoviciu" in Cluj-Napoca, Romania. In 1994 he obtained a Baccalaureate diploma. In the autumn, Candu was admitted to the Faculty of Law of the university "Babeș-Bolyai" from Cluj-Napoca, Romania. After four years of study, he was awarded a Bachelor's diploma. During September 2007 and June 2008, he studied at the Vienna University of Economics and Business Administration, Institute for Austrian and International Tax Law (Vienna, Austria), postgraduate International Tax Law Program, where he was awarded a Master's Diploma. In 2001, Andrian Candu participated in the "Human Rights and Programme Implementation" course organized by the Institute of European Law in Birmingham, UK. In the same year, Candu obtained a certificate of participation in the seminar "Public administration and individual through the European Convention of Human Rights" held in the UniDem Campus, Venice Commission in Trieste, Italy. A year later, at the University of Western Cape, he was attending the International Academy of Human Rights course, on Robben Island, Cape Town, South Africa.

== Professional activities ==
In 1998, Candu returned to Moldova, where for four years he was a principal consultant within the parliamentary Commission for Foreign Policy of the Republic of Moldova. During that period, he began to teach international law at the Public Administration Academy under the president of the Republic of Moldova. He worked as a lecturer until 2004.

In 2002, Candu became senior manager of PricewaterhouseCoopers Moldova, where he worked until 2010. He was responsible for managing a wide range of projects in the areas of taxation of individuals and businesses, expatriate tax consultancy, legal advice, and others. For a short time in 2010, he served as general manager of Prime Management company, where he was the leader of a team responsible for the management of businesses in different fields and industries including financial – banking, real estate, media, hospitality, and services. He was a member of the Moldovan International Law Association and CEO of the Moldovan Business People Association. At the end of the same year, he was elected member of the Parliament of Republic of Moldova and member of the Parliamentary Committee Legal, Appointments and Immunities.

In 2012, the National Political Council of the Democratic Party of Moldova elected Andrian Candu as vice-president of the party.

In May 2013, Candu became vice-president of the Parliament of Republic of Moldova, a position he held until July 2014 when he was appointed, by order of the president of Moldova, deputy prime minister and minister of economy. Half a year later, on 23 January 2015, he was elected President of the Moldovan Parliament with the votes of 59 lawmakers.

In October 2017, the Constitutional Court of Moldova temporarily suspended Igor Dodon from fulfilling his presidential duties due to his refusal to appoint the Minister of Defense Eugen Sturza, proposed by the parliament. On 24 October 2017 (for the period necessary for the approval of the Minister of Defence), the duties of the president of Moldova were assigned to Andrian Candu.

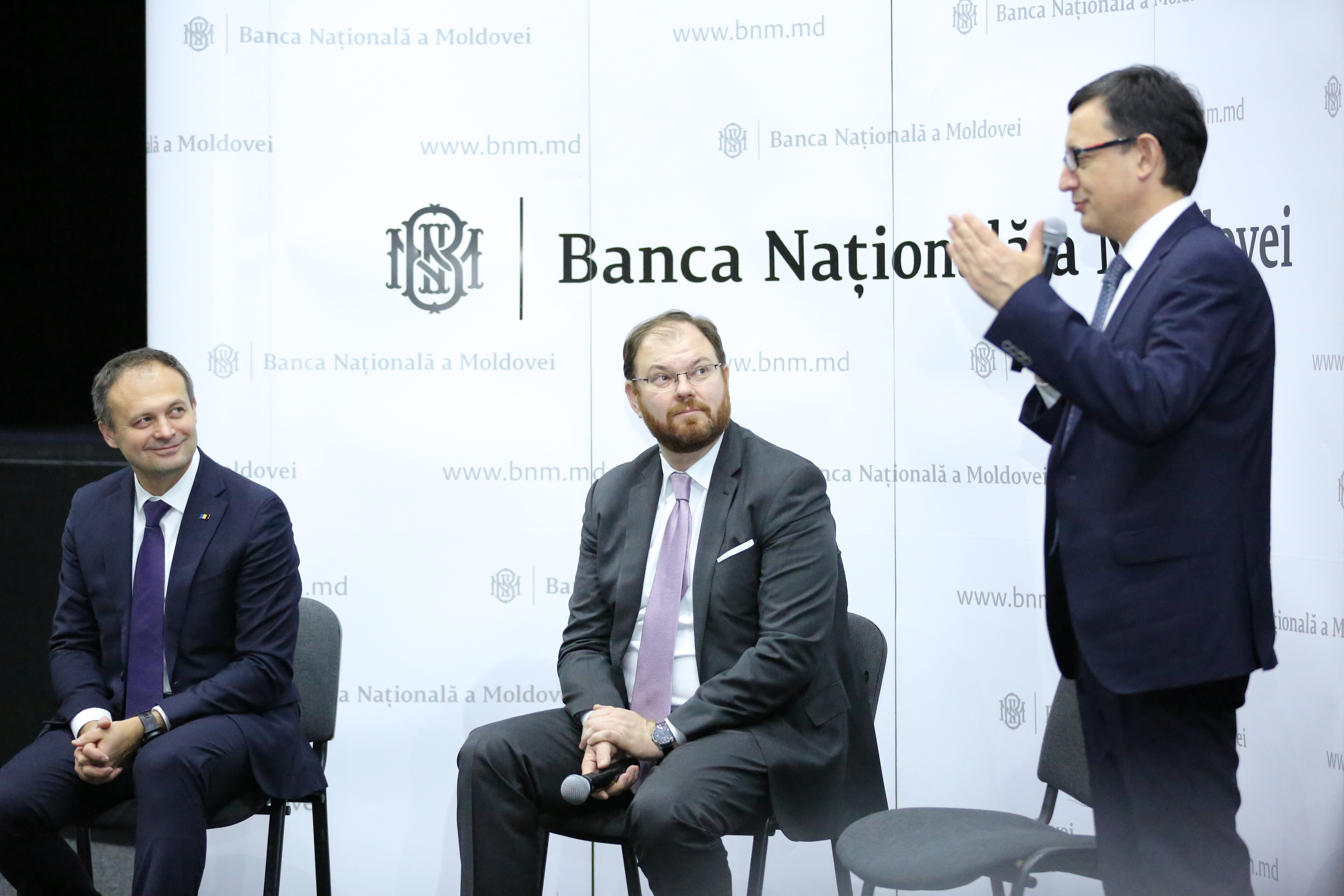
Candu with Sergiu Cioclea (centre) during the presentation of Octavian Armașu as new NBM governor, 30 November 2018

On 2 January 2018, the powers of Dodon were again temporarily suspended by a decision of the Constitutional Court of Moldova because Dodon has rejected twice the candidatures of members of the government proposed by the Prime Minister; Candu again became the interim President of the Republic of Moldova. On 5 January 2018, Dodon's powers were again temporarily suspended because he twice refused to sign the Law on the Suppression of Foreign Propaganda, adopted by the parliament at the end of 2017. On 24 September 2018, the powers of Dodon were again temporarily suspended by a decision of the Constitutional Court of Moldova because Dodon twice rejected the candidatures of members of the government proposed by the Prime Minister. On 10 December 2018, he again served as president due to Dodon's refusal to sign 4 laws.

According to the last opinion polls carried out in 2019 related to the most popular politicians of the Republic of Moldova, Andrian Candu is placed by some polls on the 10th position among the politicians which are highly trusted by the Moldovans and by some polls on the 13th position.

On 19 February 2020, Candu, together with a group of MPs, left the faction of the Democrats and the Democratic party. On 20 February 2020 they announced at the press conference about the establishment of the Pro Moldova parliamentary group. On 18 June 2020, the parliamentary group Pro Moldova became a political party with Candu as the president of this party.

On 1 September 2020, Candu was nominated by the Pro Moldova National Political Council as the party's candidate in the 1 November 2020 presidential election. He was disqualified and did not appear on the ballot because of irregularities in a list of signatures submitted to the Central Election Commission.

In October 2021, he left politics, and renounced as president of the PRO MOLDOVA Political Party.

Andrian Candu is fluent in English and Russian.

== Publications ==
During the period of his professional activities, Candu has prepared materials for publication and publications including:

- "The contract of sale – the difference between English and the Romanian law",
- "European Parliament, organization and activity",
- "International Commercial Arbitration: the difference between Moldavian, Romanian and Russian",
- "Commonwealth of Independent States, success or failure?",
- "Abuses of double taxation treaties",
- "Evolution of tax treaties – country report, Romania".

== Personal life ==
Candu is married with Zuzana Candu and has three children, Daniel, Vera and Adam. Andrian Candu speaks fluent in English and Russian.

== Honours ==
In April 2015, by a decree of the former president of Moldova Nicolae Timofti, Candu was awarded the Order of Honor. The politician has received this state award for appreciation of the contribution to reforms based on European values and standards, for outstanding achievements in ensuring the negotiation, signing and ratification of the Association Agreement Moldova – European Union, for contribution to visa liberalization with EU Member States and Schengen.

In 2018, Candu was awarded by Liviu Dragnea with the Parliament Necklace which is the highest award of the Chamber of Deputies of the Romanian Parliament.
