= Sîrcova =

- Commune
- Location in Moldova
- Coordinates: 47°44′N 28°47′E
- Country: Moldova
- District: Rezina District

Population (2023)
  - Total: 1,640
- Time zone: UTC+2 (EET)
  - Summer (DST): UTC+3 (EEST)
- Postal code: MD-5433
- Area code: +373 254

Sîrcova is a commune in Rezina District, Moldova. It is composed of two villages, Piscărești and Sîrcova.

== Notable people ==
- Nicolae Olaru
