= Larisa Miculeț =

Advisor to the President on Relations with Citizens
- In office 2 May 2025 – 29 May 2026
- President: Maia Sandu

1st Moldovan Ambassador to the Republic of Ireland
- In office 27 May 2020 – 14 March 2025
- President: Igor Dodon; Maia Sandu
- Prime Minister: Ion Chicu; Aureliu Ciocoi (acting); Natalia Gavrilița; Dorin Recean
- Succeeded by: Jana Costachi

Moldovan Ambassador to Israel and Cyprus
- In office 28 December 2005 – 11 November 2009
- President: Vladimir Voronin; Mihai Ghimpu (acting)
- Prime Minister: Vasile Tarlev; Zinaida Greceanîi; Vitalie Pîrlog (acting); Vlad Filat
- Preceded by: Artur Cozma
- Succeeded by: Mihai Balan

Personal details
- Born: 8 November 1957 (age 68) Plopi, Moldavian SSR, Soviet Union
- Education: Moldova State University
- Profession: Diplomat, Lawyer

Larisa Miculeț (born 8 November 1957) is a Moldovan lawyer and diplomat. Previously, Mrs. Miculeț held the position of Ambassador at Large at the Ministry of Foreign Affairs and European Integration being in charge of Multilateral diplomacy, and concurrently serving as the Head of National delegation to IHRA (International Holocaust Remembrance Alliance).

From 2012 to 2016, Ambassador Miculeț served as Deputy Permanent Representative at the Permanent Mission of the Republic of Moldova to the United Nations. Formerly, for two years, she was the Head of Personnel, Legislation and Litigation Division at the Ministry of Foreign Affairs of the Republic of Moldova. From January 17, 2006, until December 1, 2009, she served as the third Moldovan Ambassador to the State of Israel based in Tel Aviv and was also accredited from May 18, 2007, as the Ambassador to the Republic of Cyprus.

== Education ==
Larisa Miculeț holds a degree in law with highest honors from the Moldova State University which she graduated in 1979. As a senior professional she was the beneficiary of two United States Government Educational Programs. In 2000, she was a fellow at the American University, Washington D.C., under IREX (International Research & Exchanges Board). In 2003–2004, Larisa Miculeț was a Fulbright Program-in-residence at the American University within the School of International Service and within the Terrorism, Transnational Crime and Corruption Center (TraCCC) in Washington D.C. There, she conducted the research "Comparative analysis of the USA and Moldova legislation on fighting financial-economic crime" and thereafter published a book based on that study.

Miculeț also participated in other professional training courses in the United States and several other European countries. In December 2011, she completed a 10-week Executive Program in Advanced Security Studies at the George C. Marshall European Center for Security Studies in Garmisch-Partenkirchen, Germany. The goal of the program is to provide government officials and military officers with advanced training in global security policy, defense affairs, international relations and other related topics.

== Career ==
=== Foreign Service ===
Miculeț was nominated by the President of the Republic of Moldova as Ambassador of the Republic of Moldova to Israel on December 21, 2005 and was also accredited from May 18, 2007, to the Republic of Cyprus. She was the first woman to be appointed as ambassador of Moldova to Israel. Ambassador Miculeț arrived in Israel on January 17, 2006, and officially assumed her post after presenting the Letters of Credence to the President of Israel Moshe Katsav on March 22, 2006. "I am not a feminist because I never felt any discrimination as a woman," says Miculeț. "But I had to work harder than a man to achieve my aims and prove that I'm good at what I'm doing."

Although this was her first diplomatic assignment, she has previously represented the Government while performing a series of tasks related to international affairs within the Stability Pact for South Eastern Europe and the Council of Europe. In the period from 2001 to 2005, she acted as Moldova's Government High Level Representative to the Stability Pact Organized Crime Initiative where she launched many initiatives on regional level. She also served for many years as Moldova's national expert to various committees within the Council of Europe that dealt with international judicial cooperation, white collar crime and human trafficking, as well as advised different projects that were launched in Moldova by the Council of Europe, Stability Pact and USA Department of Justice.

==== Ambassador to the State of Israel ====
During her tenure, Larisa Miculeț worked to promote Moldova-Israeli cooperation on an entire spectrum of bilateral relations, and was subsequently credited with a significant development of the cooperation between the two countries. She organized a number of high-level visits, in particular those of the Chairman of the Parliament Marian Lupu, Deputy Prime-Minister, the Minister of Foreign Affairs Andrei Stratan and the Minister of Health Ion Ababii. Miculeț also arranged the visits to Moldova of the ex-Prime-Minister, Minister of Strategic Affairs Avigdor Lieberman and the Minister of Tourism, I. Ahranovic. During this time, Ambassador Miculet also sought to increase trade ties and foreign investments in a number of strategic sectors including agriculture, infrastructure and telecommunications. Among other notable achievements, she was also credited with the signing of the Treaty on avoiding double taxation and in fostering the bilateral humanitarian relations between the two states through the activities of the Association of Descendants from Moldova.

In April 2007, by the Decree of the President of the Republic of Moldova, Miculeț was awarded the State distinction “Meritul Civic” for strengthening Moldo-Israeli relations. It was also noted that Miculet had a very strong support from Israeli citizens that originated from Moldova, including the Minister of Foreign Affairs Avigdor Lieberman.

Through her work, she established close ties with political and economic elites and journalists of Israel, and built close relations with all religious communities in Israel, particularly with the Patriarchate of Jerusalem that has historic ties to Moldova. In this context, in December 2007, the Bishop of Chișinău and Moldova Vladimir awarded her the Medal ȚCuvioasa ParaschevaȚ of second degree.

As Moldovan Ambassador to Israel, she was also the 2007 Commencement Speaker at Wilbraham & Monson Academy in Massachusetts. that her son graduated in 2006.

==== Ambassador to the Republic of Cyprus ====
Miculeț, as non-resident Ambassador to Cyprus, played a major role in resetting bilateral cooperation with Cyprus and as a result many Moldovan initiatives concerning European integration received strong support from Cyprus in the EU. In a very short period of time, she managed to give a new impetus to the negotiation process of the Treaty on avoiding double taxation that was later signed between two countries.

=== Law career ===
Prior to her appointment as Ambassador, Miculeț was the highest-ranking woman in the Public Prosecutor's Office and headed the International Cooperation and European Integration Department. During the period from February 2001 until September 2004, she supervised the Department of Financial and Economic investigations in the Public Prosecutor's Office. She started at the Public Prosecutor's Office in 1979 and since then, held various senior posts in the General Prosecutor's Office and local prosecutor's branches.

Since 2000, she holds a special rank awarded by the Decree of the President of the Republic of Moldova Petru Lucinschi - 3rd Class State Attorney and Counselor-at-Law (equivalent to the rank of Major General). Larisa Miculet was elected twice by Parliament as member of the Public Prosecutor's Office Board Council. In September 2004, she was awarded the badge “The Honorable Employee of the Prosecutor’s Office”.

As a member of the first Moldovan Commission for the Elaboration of the Judicial Reform Strategy, formed by the Parliament, she played an important role in major legislative reforms in the country. She also taught for several years, both at the Law Faculty of Moldova State University and at the National Training Center for Judges and Prosecutors.

=== Publications, memberships and other duties ===
Miculeț has published over 350 articles and interviews on legal and foreign policy issues in local and foreign mass-media and is the author of a book on comparing the American and Moldovan prosecution of white collar crime and corruption.

Miculeț was a member of the World Economic Forum's Global Agenda Council on Organized Crime for the 2011–2012 term. Prior to this, she also held the membership of International Association of Prosecutors and International Federation of Women in Legal Careers.

In 1994 and 2001, she ran for Parliament in a coalition bloc of centrist parties called "Alianta Bragis".

== Personal life ==
Larisa Miculeț speaks fluent English, Russian, and basic German. She was married to Victor Miculeț, a leading corporate executive who is the representative of BMW in Moldova and the Chairman of the Council of Moldova Agroindbank, the largest commercial lender. Their son, Eugene, is a graduate of Columbia Business School and Clark University, and currently works at a quantitative hedge fund in London and New York.
