= Israel–Moldova relations =

Diplomatic relations between Israel and Moldova

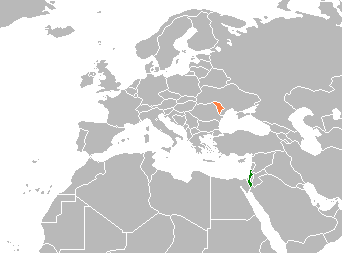

- Israel: Moldova

Diplomatic mission
- Embassy of Moldova, Tel Aviv: Embassy of Israel, Chișinău

Envoy
- Ambassador Joel Lion: Ambassador Alexandr Roitman

Relations between Israel and Moldova were established on 6 June 1992. Israel recognized Moldova on 25 December 1991. Israel is represented in Moldova through its embassy in Chișinău and Moldova has an embassy in Tel Aviv. Though the volume of trade between Israel and Moldova was low as of 2006, Larisa Miculet, the third Ambassador of Moldova to Israel has stated that there numerous untapped potential of increasing bilateral trade. For Israeli entrepreneurs and investors, Moldova is geopolitically convenient because of its location in the center of Europe, its high transparency between public authorities and foreign investors and due to it having eliminated most of the bureaucratic barriers that hinder business activities. Various business sectors of cooperation between Israel and Moldova range from pharmaceuticals, energy, information technology and software, electronics and electronic equipment, power engineering, metal and plastics processing and construction materials but Moldova has stressed foreign Israeli investments in all segments of the Moldovan economy.

== History ==
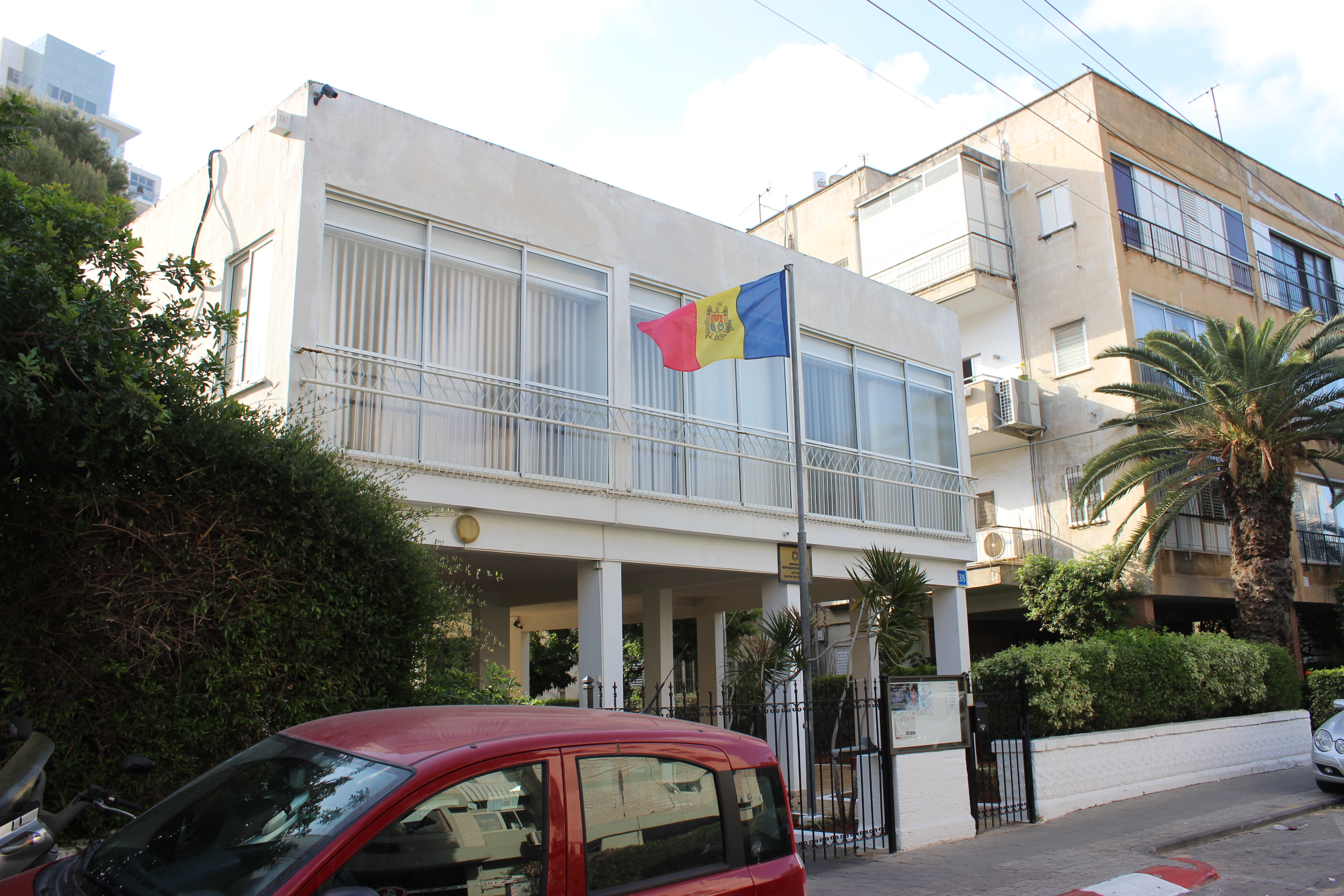
Previous Embassy of Moldova in Israel on 38 Rembrandt Street

On December 25, 1991, Israel recognized the independence of the Republic of Moldova. On June 22, 1992, diplomatic relations were officially established between the Republic of Moldova and the State of Israel. On November 1, 1994, the first Embassy of the Republic of Moldova to the State of Israel was established in Tel Aviv, Israel at 38 Rembrandt Street. In the year 2000, Israel and Moldova strengthened cooperation, via the MASHAV development programs for example. Later, in 2012, the two nations signed the Agreement on the Avoidance of Double Taxation. In February 2025, the first Embassy of the State of Israel to the Republic of Moldova was established in Chișinău.

== Trade ==
Israeli and Moldovan officials commenced negotiations on July 31, 2023, in Jerusalem, aiming to establish a free trade agreement between the two nations. The talks were initiated by Israel's Minister of Economy and Industry, Nir Barkat, and Moldova's Ambassador to Israel, Alexandr Roitman. The proposed agreement is expected to enhance economic cooperation and boost trade by making it easier for goods to move between the two countries. Ambassador Roitman expressed optimism about the potential benefits, stating that the agreement would improve the balance of trade and create a more favorable trade regime. Several international agreements were being negotiated, including mutual recognition of driving licenses and the facilitation of hiring Moldovan caregivers in Israel.

As of 2023, Moldova exports a variety of goods to Israel, including base metals, prepared foodstuffs, textiles, footwear, and headwear. Conversely, Israel's exports to Moldova consist of machinery, textiles, rubber, plastics, chemical products, precious stones, and prepared foodstuffs.

That year, Moldovan Ambassador Alexandr Roitman declared that Moldova and Israel were entering a new phase of bilateral cooperation, marked by renewed political contacts and increased economic collaboration. He noted that after a period of limited interaction, the two nations were reestablishing ties across various sectors of mutual interest. A key event in this development was the visit of Israeli Foreign Minister Eli Cohen to Moldova on August 8, 2023, the first such visit in a decade, which was seen as a historic step towards deepening the bilateral relationship. Roitman highlighted Moldova's ongoing European Union integration process as an opportunity for enhanced cooperation with Israel, particularly in sharing expertise on implementing EU regulations. Additionally, he pointed out the growing interest from Israeli businesses in Moldova, with plans for strategic projects in agriculture and other sectors.

Roitman also mentioned that upcoming initiatives, such as the launch of direct flights between Tel Aviv and Chișinău in October 2023, would further strengthen ties by boosting tourism and business exchanges between the two nations.

== Security relations ==
According to Moldovan Ambassador Alexandr Roitman, security cooperation has become a crucial aspect of the partnership between Israel and Moldova, especially in the context of the Russian invasion of Ukraine. He emphasized the shared concerns of both countries regarding Iran's involvement in the war and the growing military cooperation between Russia and Iran.

== Moldova embassy in Tel Aviv ==
The Embassy of Moldova is a diplomatic mission located in Tel Aviv and is the chief diplomatic mission of Moldova in Israel. The embassy promotes Moldova's security, prosperity and well-being, and regional peace, through partnership with Israel. The embassy deals with political, commercial, security and economic questions of interest to Moldova and Israel, and provides consular assistance to Moldovan nationals residing or traveling within Israel.

== Former Ambassadors to Israel ==
- Mihai Balan (September 12, 1995 – June 25, 2001)
- Arthur Cozma (June 25, 2001 – January 6, 2006)
- Larisa Miculet (January 6, 2006 – December 23, 2011)
- Mihai Balan (December 23, 2011 – August 7, 2013)
- Anatol Vangheli (August 7, 2013 – )

== See also ==
- Foreign relations of Israel
- Foreign relations of Moldova
- History of the Jews in Moldova
