= European People's Party of Moldova =

European People's Party of Moldova Partidul Popular European din Moldova
- Abbreviation: PPEM
- Chairman: Iurie Leancă
- Founded: 23 March 2015
- Split from: Liberal Democratic Party of Moldova
- Headquarters: Chişinău, Moldova
- Ideology: Liberal conservatism Pro-Europeanism; Moldovan-Romanian unionism
- Political position: Centre-right
- National affiliation: European People’s Platform Electoral Bloc — Iurie Leancă
- Parliament: 0 / 101
- District Presidents: 0 / 32

Website
- ppe.md

The European People's Party of Moldova (Romanian: Partidul Popular European din Moldova, PPEM) is a centre-right political party in Moldova. The party is led by Iurie Leancă, who was Prime Minister of Moldova from 2013 to 2015. For the duration of this premiership, Leancă was a member of the Liberal Democratic Party of Moldova (PLDM).

== History ==
The government of Moldova which emerged from coalition talks after the 2014 parliamentary election did not command a parliamentary majority and relied on support from the Moldovan Communist party (PCRM). The PLDM, led by former Prime Minister Vlad Filat, conceded Leancă's departure from office to the PCRM as part of this arrangement. Leancă, who was elected on the PLDM list, resigned from the party in response and launched the PPEM to continue advocating positions, notably Pro-Europeanism, he feels his former party has failed to uphold by entering into informal cooperation with Moldova's Communist Party. Besides Leancă, former deputy Prime Minister Eugen Carpov and Nicolae Juravschi are the party's other MPs. The party participated in the 2015 local election as the European People's Platform Electoral Bloc — Iurie Leancă with the Liberal Reformist Party, Democratic Action and Democracy at Home Party.

== Ideology ==
The party leadership has expressed opposition to Moldova's communist legacy and opposes even informal cooperation with communist parties. From this perspective anti-communism can be seen as part of the PPEM's platform.

“The PLDM abandoned without hesitation its original principles. The Liberal Democrats didn’t simply form an alliance with the PCRM, but also borrowed some Communist techniques from them”

— Iurie Leancă, moldova.org

== Election results ==
=== Local elections ===
==== District and municipal councils ====
Election year	# of votes	% of votes	# of overall seats won	+/–
2015	97,879	7.61	67 / 1,116	

==== City and rural councils ====
Election year	# of votes	% of votes	# of overall seats won	+/–
2015	62,690	5.90		

==== Mayors ====
Election year	# of mayors	% of mayors	# of overall mandates won	+/–
2015	27	3.0	27 / 898	
