= Angel Agache =

Moldovan politician (born 1976)

Member of the Moldovan Parliament
- In office 22 April 2009 – 23 July 2021
- Parliamentary group: Liberal Democratic Party; Democratic Party; Pro Moldova Party

Personal details
- Born: 13 August 1976 (age 49) Teleneşti, Moldavian SSR, Soviet Union
- Party: Pro Moldova (2020–present)

Angel Agache (born 13 August 1976) is a Moldovan politician, deputy in the Parliament of the Republic of Moldova in the LDPM faction, member of the "Legal Commission, Appointments and Immunities".

== Biography ==
Angel Agache was born on 13 August 1976 in the Telenești, Moldavian SSR, Soviet Union (now in the Republic of Moldova). In 1983-1993 he studied at the general school in Negureni, Telenești. In 1993, he began his studies at the Cooperatist-Trade University of Moldova, with specialization in Marketing. In the same year, he was elected as a chairman of the Students League of the Cooperatist-Trade University of Moldova. In 1996, he became the president of the Federation for Students and Youths Organizations of Moldova. In 1997, he was a member of the college of the Youth and Sports Affairs and of the Youth Council of Chișinău. In 1998, he graduated from university, having a degree in economics. In the same year, he worked as marketing and public relations manager for the Russian-American Green Hills Market S.R.L.

In 1998–2002, he defended his PhD at the Academy of Economic Studies of Moldova. From 1998 to 2004, he studied at the Academy of Law of Moldova, specializing in international public law, and after graduation got a degree in law. In parallel, in 1999 he co-chaired the Federation of Students and Youth Organizations in Moldova. In 2003, he was the chairman of the Federation of Students and Youth Organizations in Moldova. In 2004, he was the chairman of the Youth Forum "NEW MOLDOVA".

In 2004–2005, he studied at the "Ovidiu Șincai" School of Postgraduate Studies in Bucharest, specializing in political management, becoming the Master in Political Management. In 2004, he graduated from the European Institute of Political Studies, Chișinău-Strasbourg. In 2008, he was a member of the Central Permanent Bureau and of the National Political Council of LDPM. From 2009 to 2020, he was an MP in the Parliament of the Republic of Moldova, within the faction of the Liberal Democratic Party of Moldova. However, on 9 June 2020, Agache joined the parliamentary group Pro Moldova, which became a political party on 22 June.

== Personal life ==
On 11 November 2011 Angel Agache married Elena Becciev, daughter of the director, in that period, of the municipal enterprise Apă-Canal Chişinău, Constantin Becciev. The wedding took place in a luxurious hall at Moldexpo, and the religious ceremony at the Metropolitan Cathedral in Chișinău. The godfather of the two was Vasile Dragan, a millionaire in euros, who controls about 20 percent of Russia's sparkling wine market.

According to Ziarul de Gardă, on 10 April 2014, Angel Agache owned a Jeep Grand Cherokee, a Mercedes-Benz CLS, a BMWx5 and a Dacia Logan, all worth 1.2 million lei plus two suites, 42 agricultural land, 2 intravilan land and one extra-urban and forestry one. His family still owns a 100% share in the construction company Tehnodava SRL.

He has been a member of the Parliament of Moldova since 2009.
