= Trebujeni =

- Commune
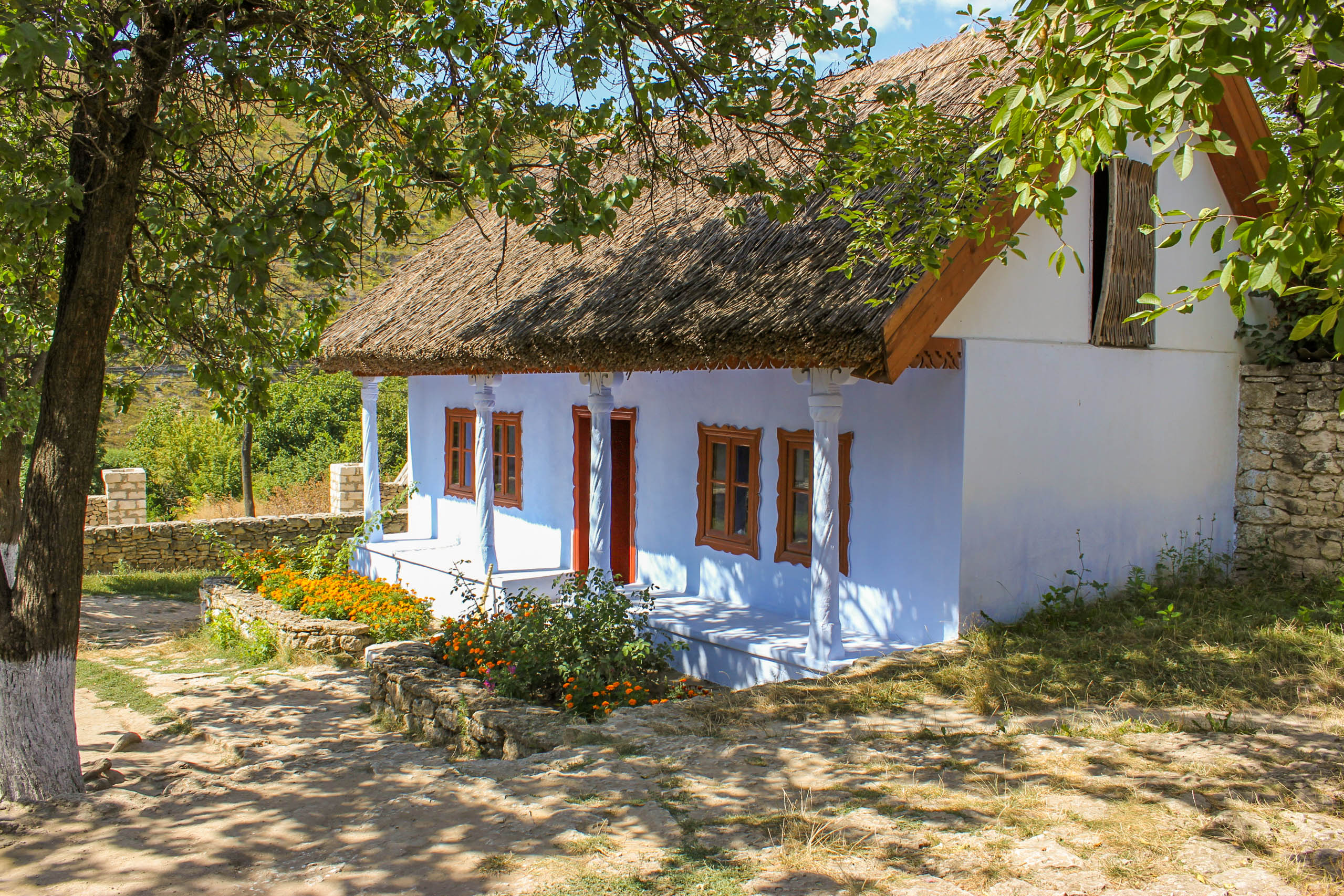
- Open-air museum in Butuceni
- Interactive map of Trebujeni
- Country: Moldova
- District: Orhei District
- Established: 1573

Population (2014)
  - Total: 1,624
- Time zone: UTC+2 (EET)
  - Summer (DST): UTC+3 (EEST)

Trebujeni is a commune in Orhei District, Moldova. It is composed of three villages: Butuceni, Morovaia and Trebujeni.

Situated at 30 km from Orhei and 60 km from Chisinau, the commune is situated on the banks of Raut river on the gorges formed by the withdrawal of the Sarmatian Sea.

== History ==
The oldest traces of human habitation on the commune's territory dates back to the 14th century. Numerous archaeological remains were discovered on the foundation of what is today Old Orhei. In the early fourteenth century, when southern and central Moldova was occupied by the Golden Horde, peasants in search of new lands sought refuge on the land that is Trebujeni today. Tatar-Mongols shortly conquered the territory and called it Șehr al-Djedid (New City). Skilled craftsmen were brought to the area which resulted in the construction of many public buildings, two inns, a mosque, three public baths of oriental style and a new stone fortress. Occupation of Old Orhei by Mongolians lasted until the early 60s, 14th century. After the defeat of the Tatar-Mongol army in 1362, the city was destroyed and left in ruins. In 1499 the city was plundered by Crimean Tatars and in 1508 the town was burned down by the Tatars. Later, near the former city's foundation, three villages were established: Trebujeni, Butuceni and Morovaia.

== Geographic Location ==
The village is surrounded by a picturesque landscape, suitable for touristic activity. The climate is continental temperate with warm and long summers, colorful autumns and mild winters.

== Economy ==
The local economy is based on agriculture and tourism. Most residents are involved in farming activities, of which 98% work in a peasant households. The services sector is represented by four commercial units and four boarding houses (Casa de sub stâncă, Casa din Luncă, Casa Verde, Vila Roz). Most people belong to the Christian Orthodox Church.

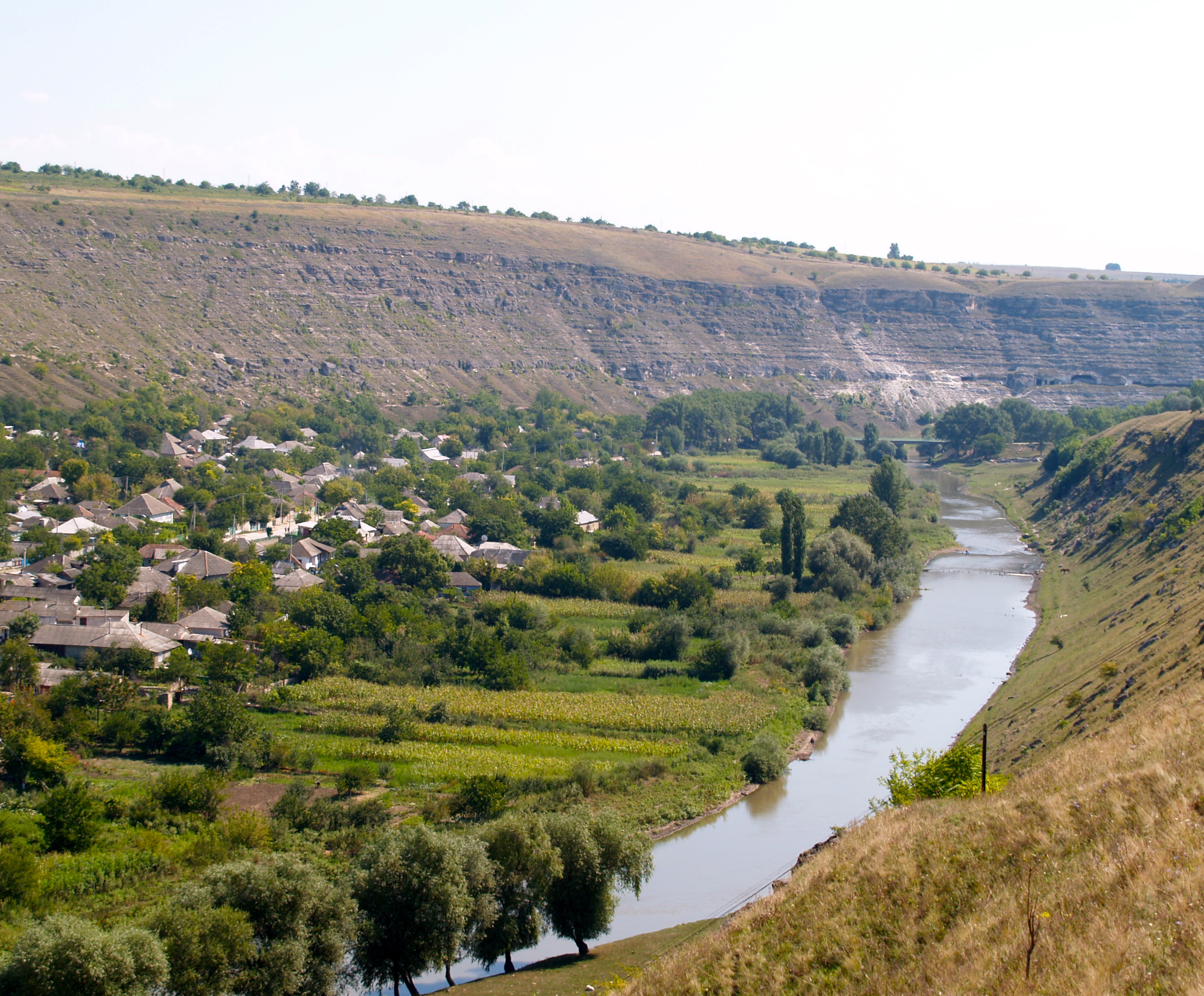
Trebujeni village

== Notable people ==
- Anatolie Vangheli (born 1961), Moldovan diplomat
