= Maria Nasu =

Member of the Moldovan Parliament

Member of the Moldovan Parliament
- Incumbent
- Assumed office 2011

Personal details
- Born: 17 September 1956 (age 69)
- Party: Liberal Democratic Party; Alliance for European Integration (2010–present)

Maria Nasu (born September 17, 1956) is a politician from Moldova. She has served as a member of the Parliament of Moldova since 2011.
