= Nicolae Olaru =

Moldovan politician (born 1958)

Member of the Moldovan Parliament
- In office 16 March 2010 – 9 March 2019
- Preceded by: Iurie Leancă
- Parliamentary group: Liberal Democratic Party

Personal details
- Born: 16 December 1958 (age 67) Sîrcova, Moldavian SSR, Soviet Union
- Party: Liberal Democratic Party; Alliance for European Integration (2009–present)

Nicolae Olaru (born 16 December 1958) is a Moldovan politician and entrepreneur, member of the LDPM, member of the Parliament of the Republic of Moldova. On 2 July 2014, along with the LDPM fraction, he voted for the ratification of the Association Agreement between the European Union and the Republic of Moldova.

== Biography ==
He has been a member of the Parliament of Moldova since 2010.
