= Iurie Leancă =

Prime Minister of Moldova from 2013 to 2015

Iurie Leancă OR
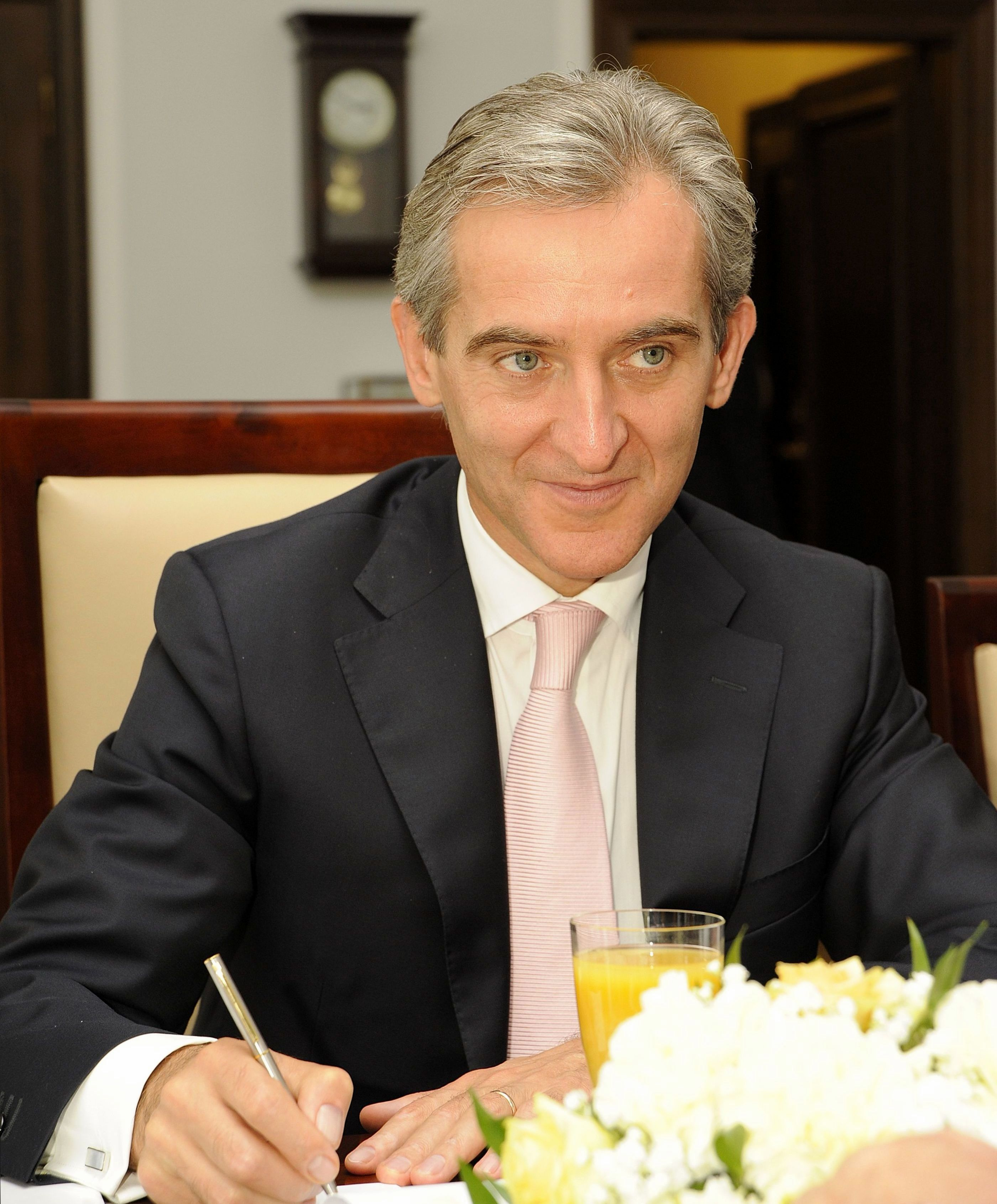
- Leancă in 2013

9th Prime Minister of Moldova
- In office 30 May 2013 – 18 February 2015
- President: Nicolae Timofti
- Deputy: See list: Natalia Gherman Valeriu Lazăr Eugen Carpov Tatiana Potîng Andrian Candu
- Preceded by: Vlad Filat
- Succeeded by: Chiril Gaburici

President of the European People's Party
- In office 23 March 2015 – 22 August 2019
- Succeeded by: Eugen Sturza (acting)

Deputy Prime Minister of Moldova for European Integration
- In office 10 January 2018 – 8 June 2019
- President: Igor Dodon
- Prime Minister: Pavel Filip
- Succeeded by: Cristina Gherasimov (2024)

Vice President of the Moldovan Parliament
- In office 2 June 2017 – 22 December 2017 Serving with: Vladimir Vitiuc
- President: Igor Dodon
- Prime Minister: Pavel Filip
- Speaker: Andrian Candu
- Preceded by: Liliana Palihovici
- Succeeded by: Valeriu Ghilețchi

Member of the Moldovan Parliament
- In office 9 December 2014 – 22 December 2017
- Succeeded by: Sergiu Ceauș
- Parliamentary group: Liberal Democratic Party; European People's Party
- In office 24 December 2010 – 14 January 2011
- Succeeded by: Maria Nasu
- Parliamentary group: Liberal Democratic Party
- In office 22 April 2009 – 25 September 2009
- Succeeded by: Nicolae Olaru
- Parliamentary group: Liberal Democratic Party

Deputy Prime Minister of Moldova
- In office 25 September 2009 – 30 May 2013 Serving with: Valeriu Lazăr
- President: Mihai Ghimpu (acting); Vlad Filat (acting); Marian Lupu (acting); Nicolae Timofti
- Prime Minister: Vlad Filat
- Preceded by: Andrei Stratan
- Succeeded by: Natalia Gherman

Minister of Foreign Affairs and European Integration
- In office 25 September 2009 – 30 May 2013
- President: Mihai Ghimpu (acting); Vlad Filat (acting); Marian Lupu (acting); Nicolae Timofti
- Prime Minister: Vlad Filat
- Preceded by: Andrei Stratan (as Minister of Foreign Affairs)
- Succeeded by: Natalia Gherman

First Deputy Minister of Foreign Affairs
- In office 22 March 1999 – 4 October 2001
- President: Petru Lucinschi; Vladimir Voronin
- Prime Minister: Ion Sturza; Dumitru Braghiș; Vasile Tarlev
- Minister: Nicolae Tăbăcaru; Nicolae Cernomaz; Nicolae Dudău

Deputy Minister of Foreign Affairs
- In office 15 June 1998 – 22 March 1999
- President: Petru Lucinschi
- Prime Minister: Ion Ciubuc; Ion Sturza
- Minister: Nicolae Tăbăcaru

Personal details
- Born: 20 October 1963 (age 62) Cimișlia, Moldavian SSR, Soviet Union (now Moldova)
- Citizenship: Moldova; Romania
- Party: European People's Party of Moldova (2015–present); Liberal Democratic Party (2009–2015)
- Other political affiliations: Alliance for Democracy and Reforms (1998–1999); Alliance for European Integration (2009–2013); Pro-European Coalition (2013–2015); PRO Romania (2019–present)
- Spouse: Aida Leancă
- Children: 2
- Education: Moscow State Institute of International Relations

Iurie Leancă (Romanian: [ˈjuri.e ˈle̯aŋkə]; born 20 October 1963) is a Moldovan politician who was the prime minister of Moldova from 2013 until 2015. He was Minister of Foreign Affairs and European Integration from 2009 to 2013 as part of the First and Second Filat Cabinet.

== Early career ==
Iurie Leancă was born on 20 October 1963 in Cimișlia. His father is Moldovan and his mother Bulgarian. He graduated from Moscow State Institute of International Relations and from 1986 until 1993, Leancă worked at the Ministry of Foreign Affairs. Between June and October 1989, he served as second secretary at the Soviet embassy in Bucharest, Romania, first secretary in the political department of the foreign ministry of the Soviet Moldavia (1989–1990), and counselor of Moldova's Minister of Foreign Affairs specializing in European affairs (1990–1993).

Between 1993 and 1997, he was the Minister-Counselor at the Embassy of Moldova in Washington, D.C. Then, he was Deputy Minister of Foreign Affairs from 1998 to 1999 and First Deputy Minister of Foreign Affairs from 1999 to 2002, in the Alliance for Democracy and Reforms cabinets and in the Vasile Tarlev Cabinet (1). Also, he was the acting Foreign Minister of Moldova from 27 July to 4 September 2001.

In October 2001 I.Leancă tendered his resignation expressing thus his disagreement with the foreign policy objectives of the Communist Party of Moldova which came to power earlier that year. Following his resignation, he worked as the Ascom Group deputy CEO (2001–2005, 2007–2009). He worked also as a Senior Adviser to the Organization for Security and Co-operation in Europe High Commissioner on National Minorities (2005–2007).

In January 2009 I.Leanca became a member of the Liberal Democratic Party of Moldova (PLDM). He was elected as MP in April 2009 election and July 2009 election. He resigned from the PLDM in early 2015, citing an insufficient commitment to pursuing pro-European reforms.

Leancă was also the vice-president of The Foreign Policy Association of Moldova (2005–2009).

== Foreign and European Integration Minister ==
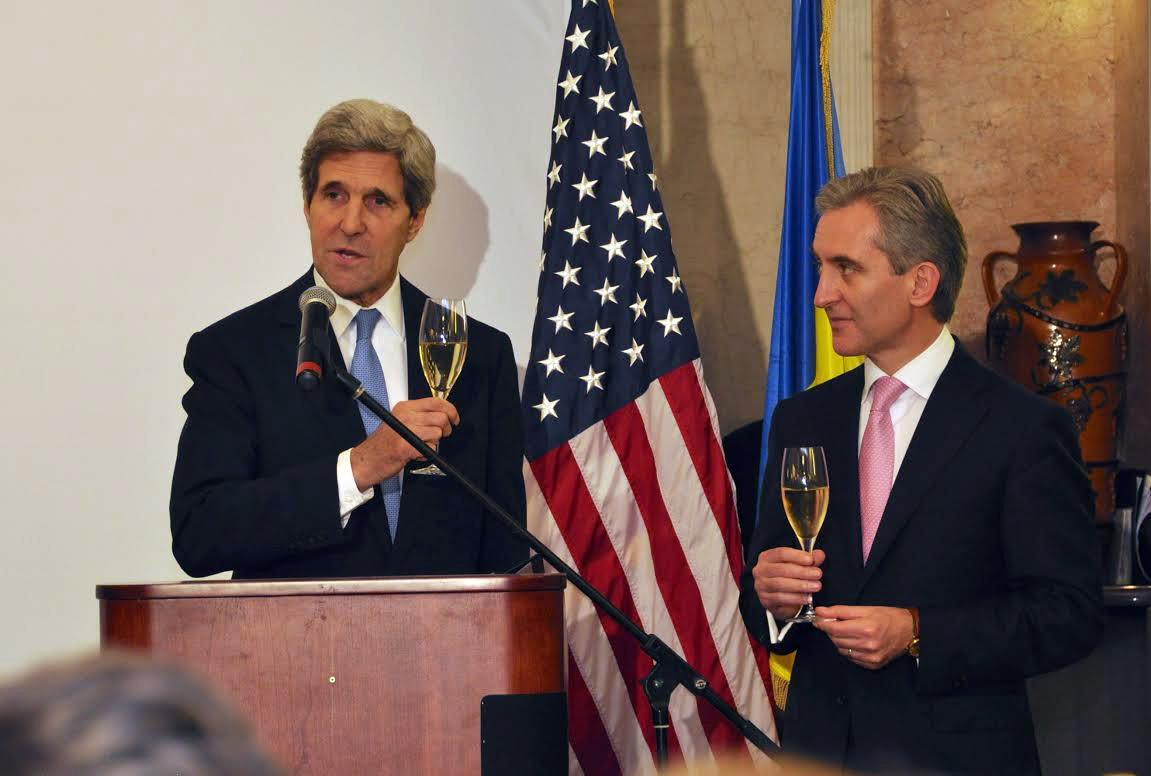
John Kerry and Iurie Leancă in December 2013.

Leancă was Deputy Prime Minister and Minister of Foreign and European Integration in the Vlad Filat Cabinet.

In a press conference on 21 October Leancă announced that official negotiations on the Moldova–EU association agreement would start on 12 January 2010.

He is married to Aida Leancă and has two children.

He speaks Romanian, Russian, English, French, Hungarian, and Bulgarian.

== Prime minister ==
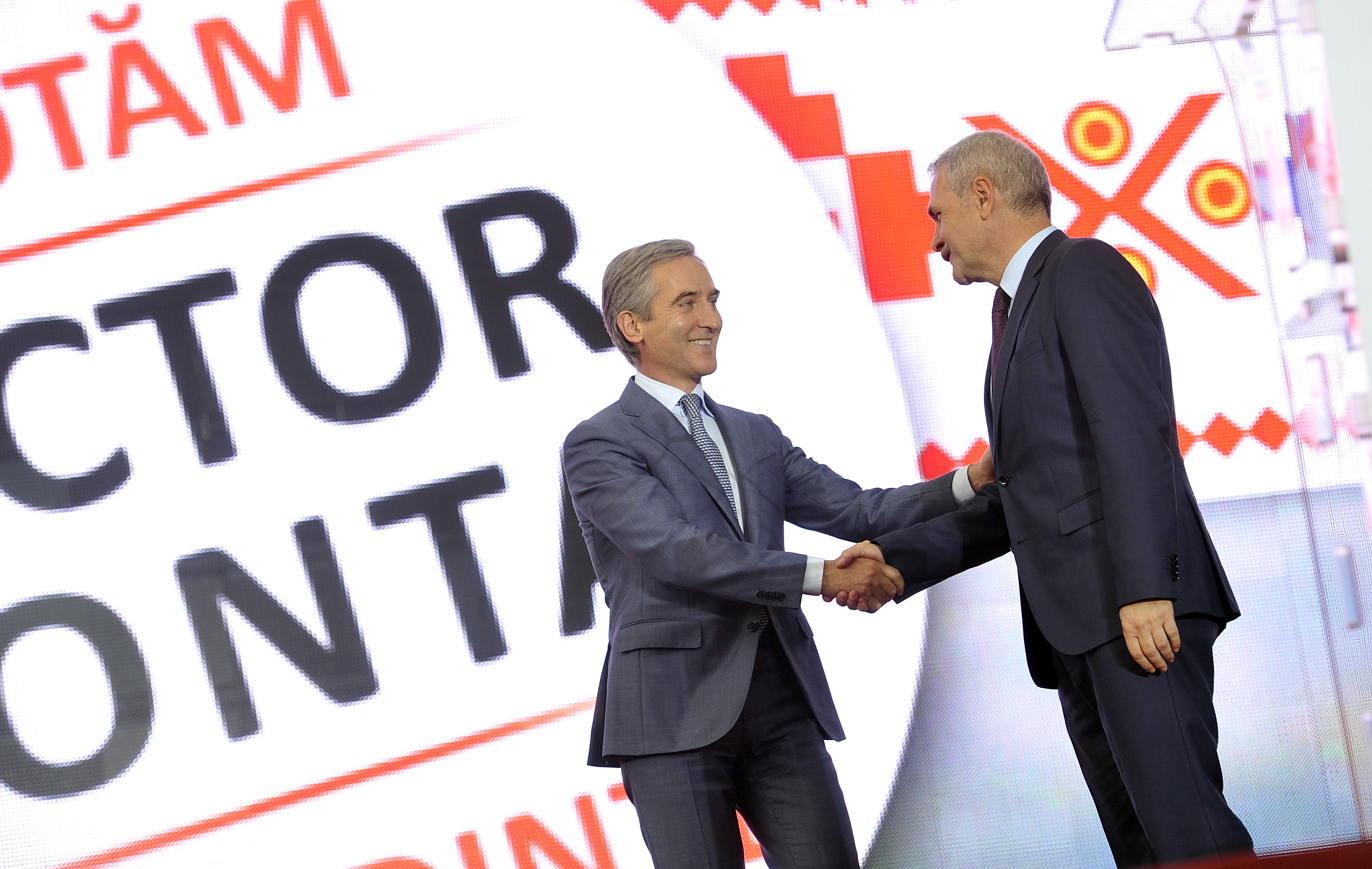
Leanca with Liviu Dragnea

He was appointed acting prime minister on 25 April 2013 following the decision of the Constitutional Court of Moldova to prevent then acting prime minister Vlad Filat from being reappointed to the position he had held since 2009. In May 2013, Leancă was proposed by the PLDM as its candidate for prime minister. On 15 May, he was designated prime minister by the president Nicolae Timofti and invited to form a government. Negotiations continued until 29 May 2013, when the Pro-European Coalition between the Liberal Democratic Party (PLDM), Democratic Party (PDM) and a break-away faction from the Liberal Party (PL), namely the Liberal Reformist Party (PLR), was agreed upon. The new government received the support of the Parliament with 58 votes on 30 May and was sworn in on 31 May.

== European Parliament candidacy ==
Leancă ran in the 2019 European Parliament election in Romania as an MEP candidate for the Victor Ponta's recently founded PRO Romania party.

Political offices
| Preceded by Andrei Stratan | Minister of Foreign Affairs and European Integration; 2009–2013 | Succeeded by Natalia Gherman |
| Preceded by Vlad Filat | Prime Minister of Moldova; 2013–2015 | Succeeded by Chiril Gaburici |
