= President of the Moldovan Parliament =

Presiding officer

President of the Parliament of Moldova
- Președintele Parlamentului Republicii Moldova
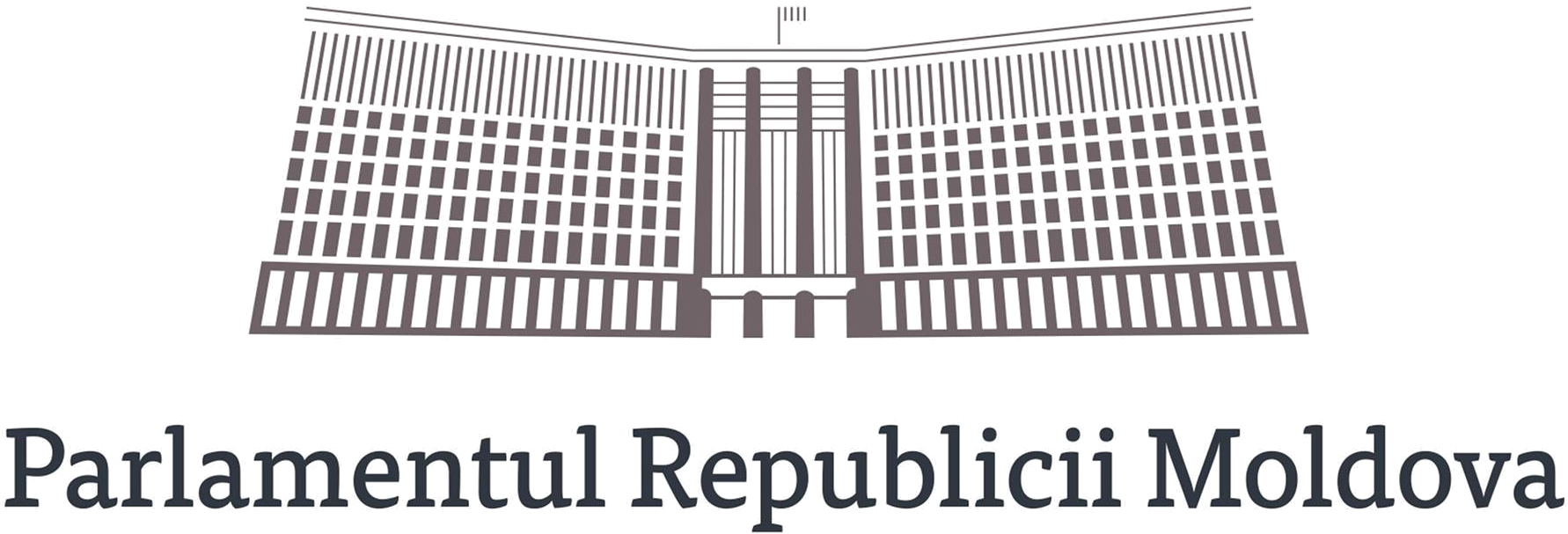
- Seal of the Parliament of Moldova

- Standard of the president of the Parliament of Moldova

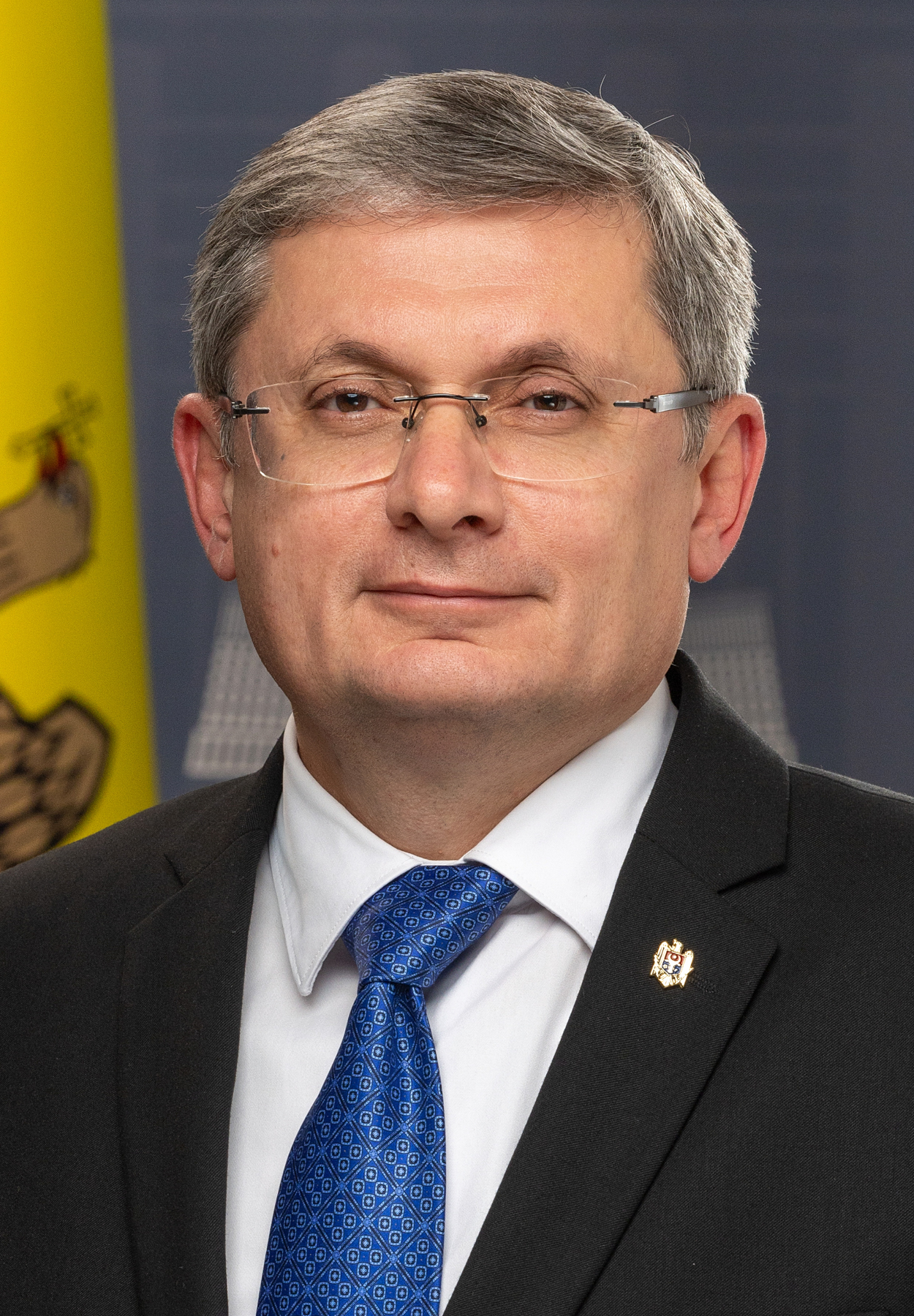
- Incumbent; Igor Grosu since 29 July 2021
- Style: His Excellency (diplomatic)
- Member of: Parliament of Moldova; National Security Council
- Residence: Parliament of Moldova
- Seat: Chișinău
- Appointer: Parliament of Moldova
- Term length: Four years
- Constituting instrument: Constitution of Moldova
- Precursor: President of the Sfatul Țării (1917–1918); Chairman of the Central Executive Committee of the Moldavian ASSR (1924–1940); Chairman of the Presidium of the Supreme Soviet of the Moldavian SSR (1941–1990)
- Inaugural holder: Ion Inculeț
- Formation: 4 December 1917 (original); 27 August 1991 (current form)
- Deputy: Vice Presidents (2)
- Salary: 6,433 USD annually
- Website: parlament.md

The president of the parliament of Moldova (Romanian: Președintele Parlamentului) is the presiding officer of the parliament of Moldova. The current president of the Parliament is Igor Grosu since 29 July 2021.

== Last election ==
Election of the President of the Parliament
Vote →	22 October 2025	
Required majority →	51 out of 101	
Igor Grosu (PAS): • PAS (55)	55 / 101	check
Alexandr Stoianoglo (Alternative): • PSRM (17); • Alternative (8); • PCRM (7)	32 / 101	X mark
Did not vote: • PN (6); • PPDA (6); • Non-attached (1)	13 / 101	
Absentees: • PCRM (1)	1 / 101	

== History ==
=== Moldavian Democratic Republic ===
No.	Portrait	Name (Birth–Death)	Office term	
1		Ion Inculeț (1884–1940)	4 December 1917	9 April 1918
2		Constantin Stere (1865–1936)	9 April 1918	25 November 1918
3		Pan Halippa (1883–1979)	25 November 1918	27 November 1918

=== Moldavian Autonomous Soviet Socialist Republic ===
Chairmen of the Central Executive Committee of the Moldavian ASSR:

No.	Portrait	Name (Birth–Death)	Office term	
1		Grigore Borisov (1880–1937)	12 October 1924	1 May 1926
2		Tihon Konstantinov (1898–1957)	1 July 1938	28 June 1940

=== Moldavian Soviet Socialist Republic ===
Chairmen of the Supreme Soviet of the Moldavian SSR:

No.	Portrait	Name (Birth–Death)	Office Term	
1		Nikita Salogor (1901–1986)	8 February 1941	13 May 1947
2		Macarie Radul (1910–1971)	13 May 1947	26 March 1951
3		Semion Cojuhari (1905–1960)	26 March 1951	17 April 1959
4		Iosif Vartician (1910–1982)	17 April 1959	4 March 1963
5		Andrei Lupan (1912–1992)	4 March 1963	11 April 1967
6		Sergiu Rădăuțanu (1926–1998)	11 April 1967	14 July 1971
7		Artem Lazarev (1914–1999)	14 July 1971	10 April 1980
8		Pavel Boțu (1933–1987)	10 April 1980	29 March 1985
9		Mihail Lupașcu (1928–2016)	29 March 1985	12 July 1986
10		Ion Ciobanu (1927–2001)	12 July 1986	17 April 1990
11		Mircea Snegur (1940–2023)	27 April 1990	3 September 1990
12		Alexandru Moșanu (1932–2017)	3 September 1990	27 August 1991

Chairmen of the Presidium of the Supreme Soviet of the Moldavian SSR:

No.	Portrait	Name (Birth–Death)	Office Term	
1		Fyodor Brovko (1904–1960)	10 February 1941	26 March 1951
2		Ion Codiță (1899–1980)	28 March 1951	3 April 1963
3		Kirill Ilyashenko (1915–1980)	3 April 1963	10 April 1980
4		Ivan Calin (1935–2012)	19 April 1980	24 December 1985
5		Alexandru Mocanu (1934–2018)	24 December 1985	29 July 1989
6		Mircea Snegur (1940–2023)	29 July 1989	17 April 1990

== Parliament of the Republic of Moldova ==
On 5 June 1990, the Moldavian SSR (RSS Moldovenească) changed its name to Soviet Socialist Republic of Moldova (RSS Moldova). Subsequently, on 23 May 1991 it adopted the name Republic of Moldova (Republica Moldova).

Presidents of the Parliament of the Republic of Moldova:

No.	Portrait	Name (born–died)	Term of office			Political party	Prior office	Parliament (election)
No.	Portrait	Name (born–died)	Took office	Left office	Time in office	Political party	Prior office	Parliament (election)
1		Alexandru Moșanu (1932–2017)	27 August 1991	2 February 1993	1 year, 160 days	Popular Front	Chairman of the Supreme Soviet of SSR Moldova	1st (1990)
2		Petru Lucinschi (born 1940)	4 February 1993	27 February 1994	3 years, 341 days	Democratic Agrarian Party	Ambassador to Russia	1st (1990)
2		Petru Lucinschi (born 1940)	27 February 1994	9 January 1997	3 years, 341 days	Democratic Agrarian Party	Ambassador to Russia	2nd (1994)
3		Dumitru Moțpan (1940–2018)	5 March 1997	23 April 1998	1 year, 49 days	Democratic Agrarian Party	Vice President of the Parliament	2nd (1994)
4		Dumitru Diacov (born 1952)	23 April 1998	25 February 2001	2 years, 308 days	Democratic Party	Vice President of the Parliament	3rd (1998)
5		Eugenia Ostapciuc (born 1947)	20 March 2001	24 March 2005	4 years, 4 days	Party of Communists	Member of the Parliament	4th (2001)
6		Marian Lupu (born 1966)	24 March 2005	5 May 2009	4 years, 42 days	Party of Communists	Minister of Economy	5th (2005)
7	Владимир Воронин (12-06-2014)	Vladimir Voronin (born 1941)	12 May 2009	28 August 2009	108 days	Party of Communists	President of Moldova	6th (Apr. 2009)
8		Mihai Ghimpu (born 1951)	28 August 2009	28 December 2010	1 year, 122 days	Liberal Party	President of the Chișinău Municipal Council	7th (Jul. 2009)
9		Marian Lupu (born 1966)	30 December 2010	25 April 2013	2 years, 116 days	Democratic Party	President of the Parliament	8th (2010)
–		Liliana Palihovici (born 1971)	25 April 2013	30 May 2013	35 days	Liberal Democratic Party	Vice President of the Parliament	8th (2010)
10		Igor Corman (born 1969)	30 May 2013	29 December 2014	1 year, 213 days	Democratic Party	Ambasador to Germany and Denmark	8th (2010)
11		Andrian Candu (born 1975)	23 January 2015	9 March 2019	4 years, 45 days	Democratic Party	Deputy Prime Minister, Minister of Economy	9th (2014)
12		Zinaida Greceanîi (born 1956)	8 June 2019	26 July 2021	2 years, 48 years	Party of Socialists	Prime Minister of Moldova	10th (2019)
13		Igor Grosu (born 1972)	29 July 2021	Incumbent	5 years, 40 days	Party of Action and Solidarity	Deputy Minister of Education	11th (2021)
13		Igor Grosu (born 1972)	29 July 2021	Incumbent	5 years, 40 days	Party of Action and Solidarity	Deputy Minister of Education	12th (2025)
