= Tudor Ulianovschi =

Moldovan politician and diplomat

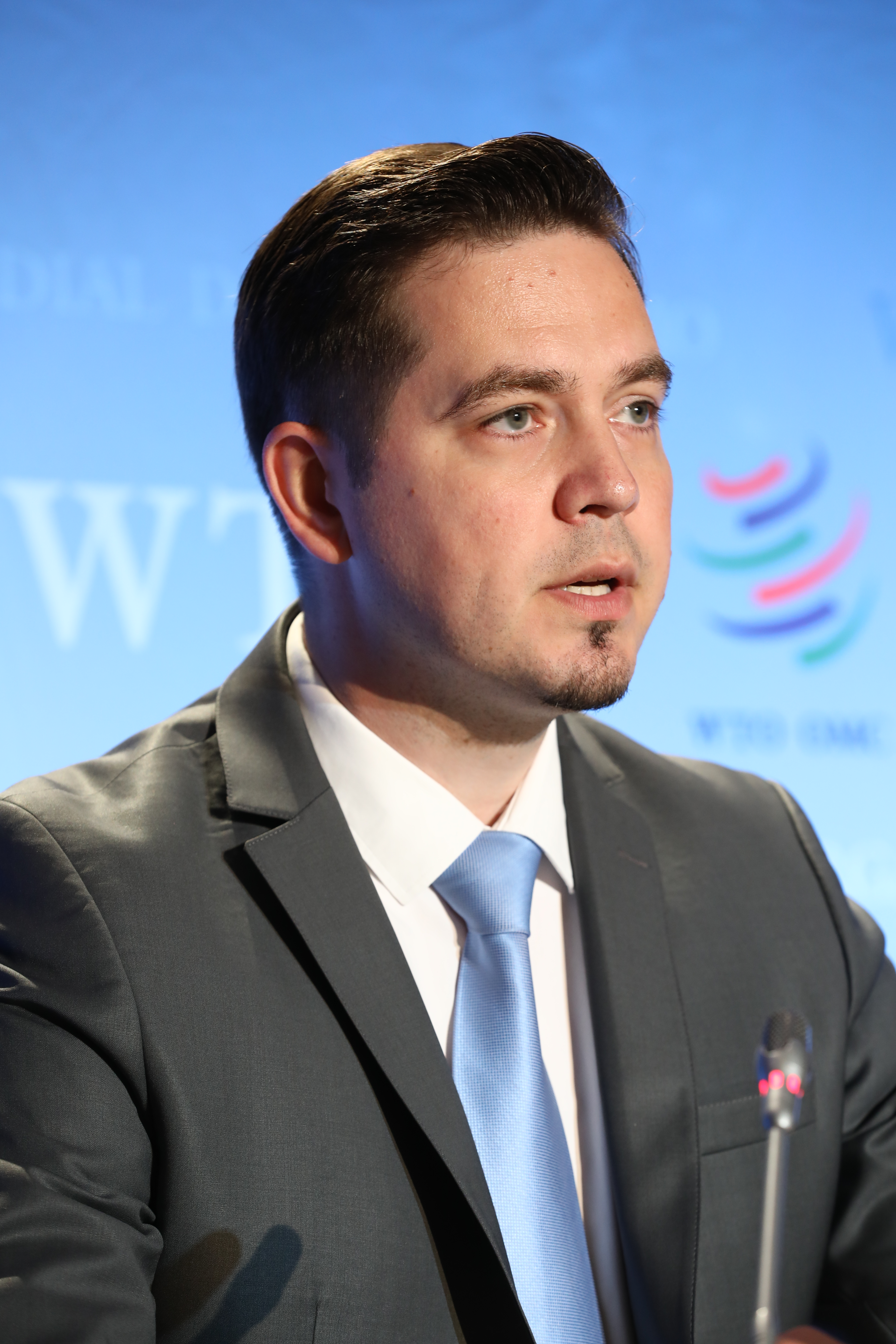
- Ulianovschi in 2020

President of the European Social Democratic Party
- In office 22 December 2024 – 5 November 2025
- Preceded by: Ion Sula
- Succeeded by: Vasile Bumacov

Minister of Foreign Affairs and European Integration
- In office 18 January 2018 – 8 June 2019
- President: Igor Dodon
- Prime Minister: Pavel Filip
- Preceded by: Andrei Galbur
- Succeeded by: Nicu Popescu

Moldovan Ambassador to Switzerland and Liechtenstein; Permanent Representative to the United Nations Office at Geneva
- In office 28 January 2016 – 10 January 2018
- President: Nicolae Timofti; Igor Dodon
- Prime Minister: Pavel Filip
- Preceded by: Victor Moraru
- Succeeded by: Oxana Domenti

Deputy Minister of Foreign Affairs and European Integration
- In office 15 January 2014 – 10 February 2016
- President: Nicolae Timofti
- Prime Minister: Iurie Leancă; Chiril Gaburici; Natalia Gherman (acting); Valeriu Streleț; Gheorghe Brega (acting); Pavel Filip
- Minister: Natalia Gherman; Andrei Galbur

Personal details
- Born: May 25, 1983 (age 43) Florești, Moldavian SSR, Soviet Union
- Party: European Social Democratic Party (since 2024)
- Education: Free International University of Moldova (2000–2005); State University of Moldova (2007–2008)
- Profession: diplomat

Tudor Ulianovschi (pronunciation: [uljaˈnovski], born 25 May 1983) is a Moldovan politician and diplomat who was Foreign Minister of Moldova between January 2018 and June 2019. Prior to that, he served as the Moldovan Ambassador to Liechtenstein and Switzerland.

== Educational background ==
Ulianovschi's academic background is in International Public and Trade Law, at the Free International University of Moldova (an LL.M. degree and a PhD candidate), the Diplomatic Academy of Vienna and the Diplomatic Institute of Bucharest. As a fellow, from 2002 to 2003 he studied in Kentucky, sponsored by the U.S. government. Since 2008, he has been pursuing a PhD at Moldova State University.

== Diplomatic career ==
Between 2016 and 2018, he was the Moldovan top diplomat in Geneva, serving as Ambassador to Switzerland and Liechtenstein, as well as the Permanent Representative to the United Nations Office in Geneva and Permanent Representative to the World Trade Organization (WTO). During his mandate in Geneva, Ulianovschi served on and chaired various committees, including the Balance of Payments Committee of the WTO, the Trade and Development Board at UNCTAD the General Assembly at WIPO, and the Steering Committee on Trade at UNECE. He also has served at the Embassies of the Republic of Moldova in Washington, DC (2007–2010) and Doha (2013–2014), before becoming the Deputy Foreign Minister.

== Foreign minister ==
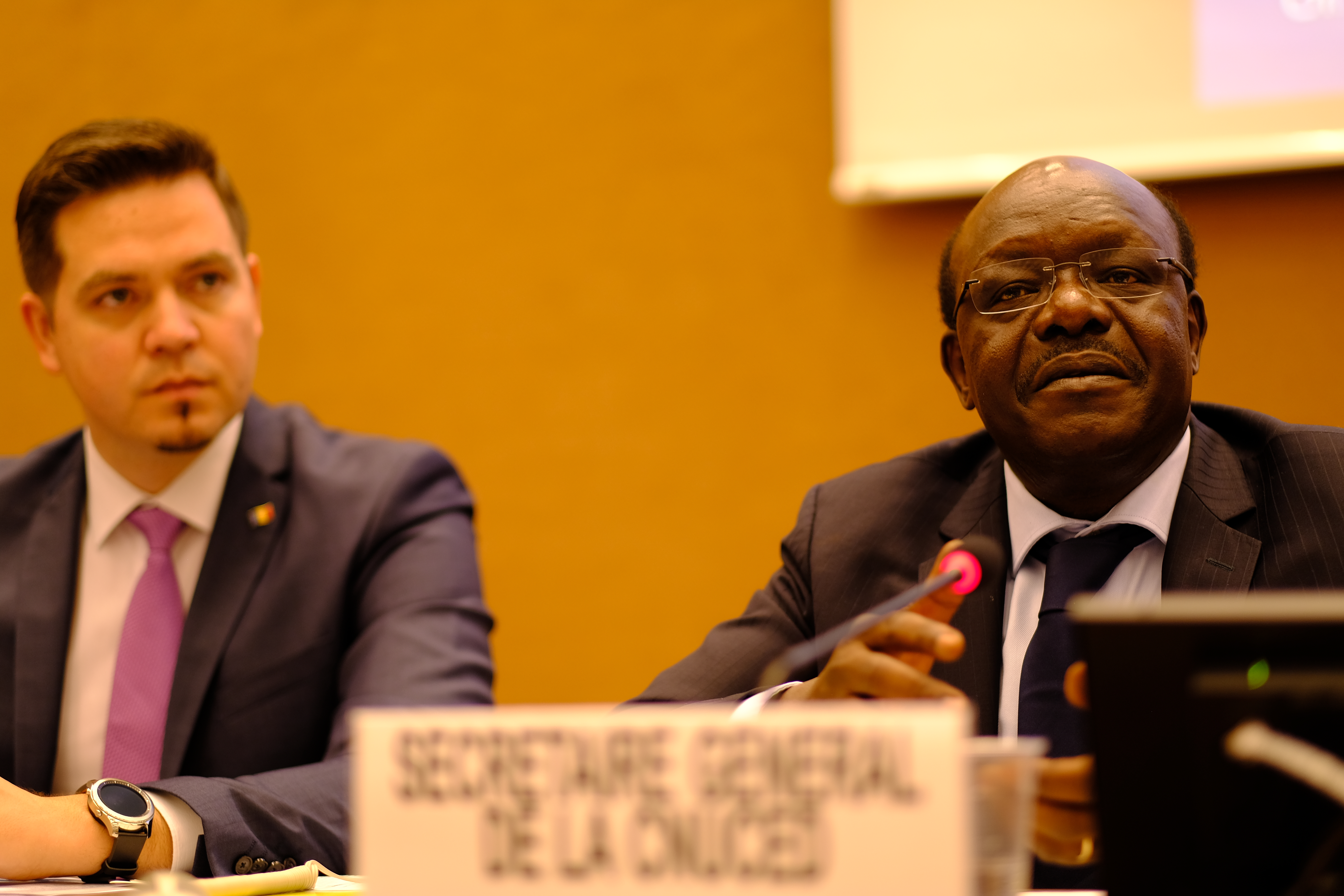
As President of the Trade and Development Board of UNCTAD

As Moldova's Foreign Minister, Ulianovschi promoted government decisions to open new diplomatic missions in Africa, Latin America, India and Europe, During his mandate, Moldova ratified and implemented the WTO Trade Facilitation Agreement and became a member of the WTO Government Procurement Agreement. He represented Moldova at the World Economic Forum in Davos in 2019. One of his major diplomatic breakthroughs achieved during his tenure was the adoption of United Nations General Assembly resolution (document A/72/L.58) in June 2018 which called on the Operational Group of Russian Forces to be withdrawn from Moldovan territory.

== Personal life ==
He is currently married to Corina Cojocaru and has a child. Besides his native Romanian language, he is fluent in English, Russian, French and Arabic. He was a legal advisor to various non-governmental organizations in the field of human and patient rights.
