= Filip Cabinet =

Government of Moldova

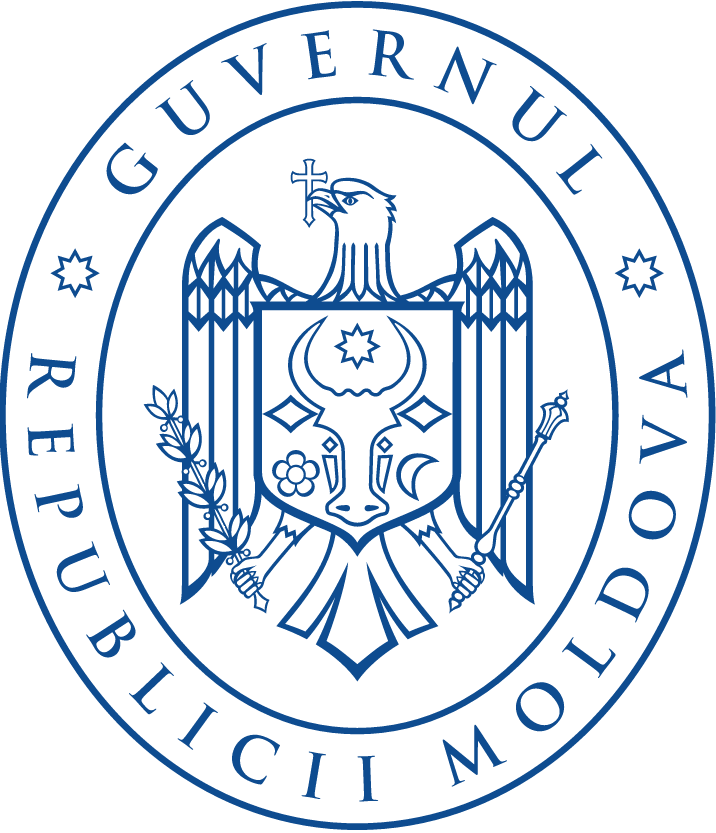
- Cabinet of Moldova

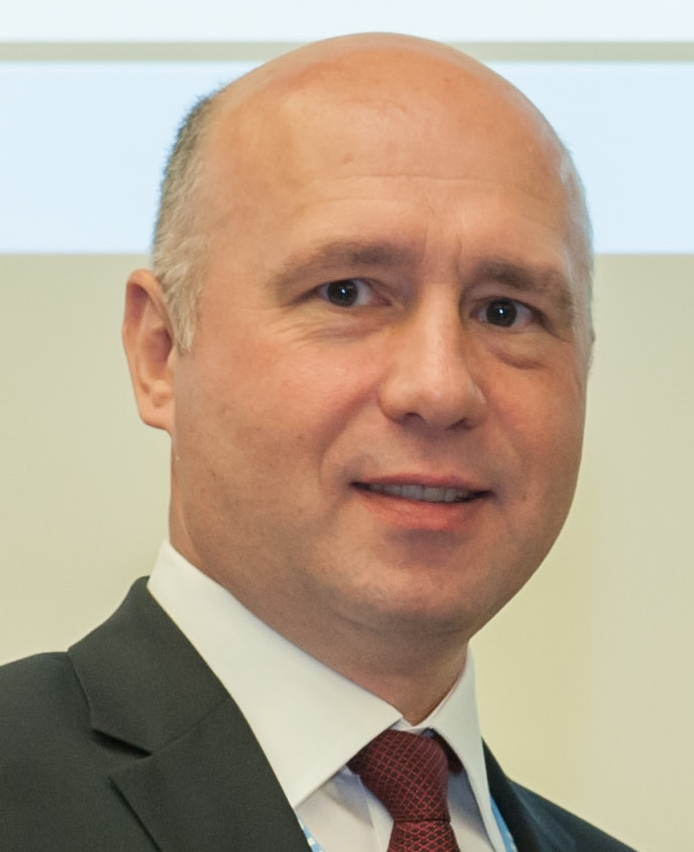
- Pavel Filip
- Date formed: 20 January 2016
- Date dissolved: 8 June 2019

People and organisations
- Head of state: Nicolae Timofti (2016); Igor Dodon (2016→)
- Head of government: Pavel Filip
- Deputy head of government: Octavian Calmîc; Andrei Galbur; Gheorghe Bălan; Gheorghe Brega; Iurie Leancă; Cristina Lesnic
- No. of ministers: 9+2 (2017→)
- Ministers removed: 16+2 (2016–17)
- Member parties: PDM, PPEM, PL (until 2017)
- Status in legislature: Majority (coalition)
- Opposition parties: PSRM; PLDM; PCRM; PL (2017→)
- Opposition leaders: Zinaida Greceanîi; Tudor Deliu; Vladimir Voronin; Mihai Ghimpu (2017→)

History
- Outgoing election: 2014
- Legislature term: 2014–19
- Predecessor: Streleț Cabinet
- Successor: Sandu Cabinet

The Filip Cabinet was the Cabinet of Moldova led by Pavel Filip from January 2016 to June 2019.

== Overview ==
After the dismissal of previous cabinet, no consensus was reached by the three pro-European parliamentary parties - Liberal Democratic Party of Moldova (PLDM), Democratic Party of Moldova (PDM), and Liberal Party (PL). A new political crisis began. After on early 21 December 2015 Vlad Plahotniuc has announced his return in politics and in the Democratic Party, stating that he "will participate directly in the process of forming a new parliamentary majority [...] which also will succeed to gain all the needed votes for the election of the president in the next March" (2016), a few hours later, in the morning of 21 December 2015, a group of 14 communist MPs have announced that they were leaving the communist faction in parliament and will form a new parliamentary group - The Social Democratic Platform for Moldova (Platforma Social Democrată Pentru Moldova), and later PDM and the group of former communists MPs began discussions regarding the formation of a new parliamentary majority.

On 13 January 2016 the newly formed parliamentary majority nominated Vlad Plahotniuc for the function of Prime Minister of Moldova, however, the president of Moldova Nicolae Timofti has rejected the candidature with a rationale which says that "there are reasonable suspicions that Mr. Vladimir Plahotniuc does not meet the criteria of integrity necessary for his appointment as Prime Minister, considering also that by the Decision no. 5 of 15.02.2013 of the Parliament of the Republic of Moldova, published in the Official Gazette on 22.02.2013, Mr. Vladimir Plahotniuc expressed a vote of mistrust in his capacity as first deputy chairman of the Parliament, accusing him of involvement in illegal activities that are prejudicial to the image of the Parliament, and the Republic of Moldova".

Later Nicolae Timofti designated Ion Păduraru for the function of Prime Minister, but after Păduraru gave up, the parliamentary majority has nominated Pavel Filip - former Minister of Informational Technologies and Communications. During the parliamentary meeting, a group of protesters gathered in front of the Parliament building that demanded the interruption of the vote. After the president appointed Filip as Prime Minister of Moldova and Filip Cabinet was inaugurated in night, a series of protests was resumed. The cabinet headed by Filip was voted by 57 of 101 MPs: all 20 Democratic Party MPs, 13 Liberal Party MPs, 14 former communist (PCRM) MPs, 8 PLDM MPs, and another 2 former PLDM MPs.

On 13 December 2016, PL chairman, Mihai Ghimpu, withdrew the political support to Anatol Șalaru (minister of defense). After the newly elected president Igor Dodon was sworn in, on 27 December he signed the decree on the dismissal of Șalaru from the position of Minister of Defense. Since then, deputy minister Gheorghe Galbura was acting minister of defense.

On 15 March 2017, the formally independent minister of Agriculture and Food Industry Eduard Grama (a close person to Liberal Democratic Party of Moldova) was retained in an alleged corruption case. Few days later, Grama resigns from the office, and on 20 March president Dodon formally signs his dismissal decree.

In late April 2017 the anti-corruption prosecutors and the CNA officers retained liberal minister of Transport and Roads Infrastructure Iurie Chirinciuc, suspecting him in corruption acts.

After on 25 May 2017 the liberal mayor of Chișinău Dorin Chirtoacă was retained by the anti-corruption prosecutors and National Anti-Corruption Center officers, on 26 May, PL chairman Mihai Ghimpu has announced that Liberal Party leaves the government coalition. Later, on 29 May, three liberal ministers: Deputy Prime Minister on Social Affairs - Gheorghe Brega, Ministry of Education - Corina Fusu, and Ministry of Environment - Valeriu Munteanu, and their liberal deputy ministers, have announced that they resign from their posts. Next day president Dodon signed the decrees for their dismissals, and one more decree for the liberal Minister of Transport and Roads Infrastructure of Moldova Iurie Chirinciuc, who at that moment was placed under home arrest.

In the summer of 2017 a reform of the government was conducted, and following the transfers of powers, nine ministries remained out 16 ones, and no more liberal ministers remained in the cabinet componence. The reform was criticized by the parliamentary opposition. In September 2017 president Dodon rejected two times the candidature of Eugen Sturza (from European People's Party of Moldova) for the office of Minister of Defence, nominee by cabinet, arguing by "lack of competence in domain". Later, on 24 October 2017, the President of Parliament of Moldova, Andrian Candu, as acting President of Moldova, has signed the decree for naming Sturza as Minister of Defence.

The cabinet was reshuffled on 20 December 2017. Six ministers were dismissed in an attempt to reform the government.

== Composition ==
=== Final composition ===
Title	Image	Name	Party	Term start	Term end
Prime Minister		Pavel Filip	PDM	20 January 2016	8 June 2019
Deputy Prime Minister for European Integration		Iurie Leancă	PPEM	10 January 2018	8 June 2019
Deputy Prime Minister for Reintegration		Cristina Lesnic	PDM	10 January 2018	8 June 2019
Minister of Economy and Infrastructure		Octavian Calmîc	PDM	25 July 2017	21 December 2017
Minister of Economy and Infrastructure		Chiril Gaburici	PDM	10 January 2018	8 June 2019
Minister of Foreign Affairs and European Integration		Tudor Ulianovschi	PDM	10 January 2018	8 June 2019
Minister of Finance		Ion Chicu	PDM	10 December 2018	8 June 2019
Minister of Justice		Victoria Iftodi	PDM	19 March 2018	8 June 2019
Minister of Internal Affairs		Alexandru Jizdan	PDM	20 January 2016	8 June 2019
Minister of Defense		Eugen Sturza	PPEM	24 October 2017	8 June 2019
Minister of Agriculture, Regional Development and Environment		Vasile Bîtca	PDM	25 July 2017	21 December 2017
Minister of Agriculture, Regional Development and Environment		Liviu Volconovici	PDM	10 January 2018	18 September 2018
Minister of Agriculture, Regional Development and Environment		Nicolae Ciubuc	PDM	18 September 2018	8 June 2019
Minister of Education, Culture and Research		Monica Babuc	PDM	25 July 2017	8 June 2019
Minister of Health, Labour and Social Protection		Stela Grigoraș	PDM	25 July 2017	21 December 2017
Minister of Health, Labour and Social Protection		Svetlana Cebotari	PDM	10 January 2018	18 September 2018
Minister of Health, Labour and Social Protection		Silvia Radu	PDM	18 September 2018	8 June 2019

=== Ex officio member ===
The Başkan (Governor) of Gagauzia is elected by universal, equal, direct, secret and free suffrage on an alternative basis for a term of 4 years. One and the same person can be a governor for no more than two consecutive terms. The Başkan of Gagauzia is confirmed as a member of the Moldovan government by a decree of the President of Moldova.

Title	Image	Name	Party	Term start	Term end
Governor of Gagauzia		Irina Vlah	Independent	30 July 2015	18 July 2013

=== Initial composition ===
Title	Image	Name	Party	Term start	Term end
Prime Minister		Pavel Filip	PDM	20 January 2016	8 June 2019
Deputy Prime Minister, Minister of Economy		Octavian Calmîc	PDM	20 January 2016	25 July 2017
Deputy Prime Minister, Minister of Foreign Affairs and European Integration		Andrei Galbur	PDM	20 January 2016	21 December 2017
Deputy Prime Minister for Reintegration		Gheorghe Bălan	PDM	20 January 2016	21 December 2017
Deputy Prime Minister for Reintegration		Cristina Lesnic	PDM	10 January 2018	8 June 2019
Deputy Prime Minister for Social Affairs		Gheorghe Brega	PL	30 July 2015	30 May 2017
Minister of Finance		Octavian Armașu	PDM	20 January 2016	30 November 2018
Minister of Finance		Ion Chicu	PDM	10 December 2018	8 June 2019
Minister of Justice		Vladimir Cebotari	PDM	30 July 2015	21 December 2017
Minister of Justice		Alexandru Tănase	PDM	10 January 2018	12 March 2018
Minister of Justice		Victoria Iftodi	PDM	19 March 2018	8 June 2019
Minister of Internal Affairs		Alexandru Jizdan	PDM	20 January 2016	8 June 2019
Minister of Defense		Anatol Șalaru	PL	30 July 2015	27 December 2016
Minister of Defense		Eugen Sturza	PPEM	24 October 2017	8 June 2019
Minister of Regional Development and Construction		Vasile Bîtca	PDM	18 February 2015	25 July 2017
Minister of Agriculture and Food Industry		Eduard Grama	PDM	20 January 2016	20 March 2017
Minister of Transport and Roads Infrastructure		Iurie Chirinciuc	PL	30 July 2015	30 May 2017
Minister of Environment		Valeriu Munteanu	PL	30 July 2015	30 May 2017
Minister of Education		Corina Fusu	PL	30 July 2015	30 May 2017
Minister of Culture		Monica Babuc	PDM	30 May 2013	25 July 2017
Minister of Labour, Social Protection and Family		Stela Grigoraș	PDM	20 January 2016	25 July 2017
Minister of Health		Ruxanda Glavan	PDM	30 July 2015	25 July 2017
Minister of Youth and Sport		Victor Zubcu	PDM	20 January 2016	25 July 2017
Minister of Information Technology and Communications		Vasile Botnari	PDM	20 January 2016	15 February 2017

=== Ex officio members ===
Title	Image	Name	Party	Term start	Term end
Governor of Gagauzia		Irina Vlah	Independent	30 July 2015	18 July 2023
President of the Academy of Sciences of Moldova		Gheorghe Duca	Independent	24 August 2004	28 November 2018

== Achievements ==
"The First House" Programme

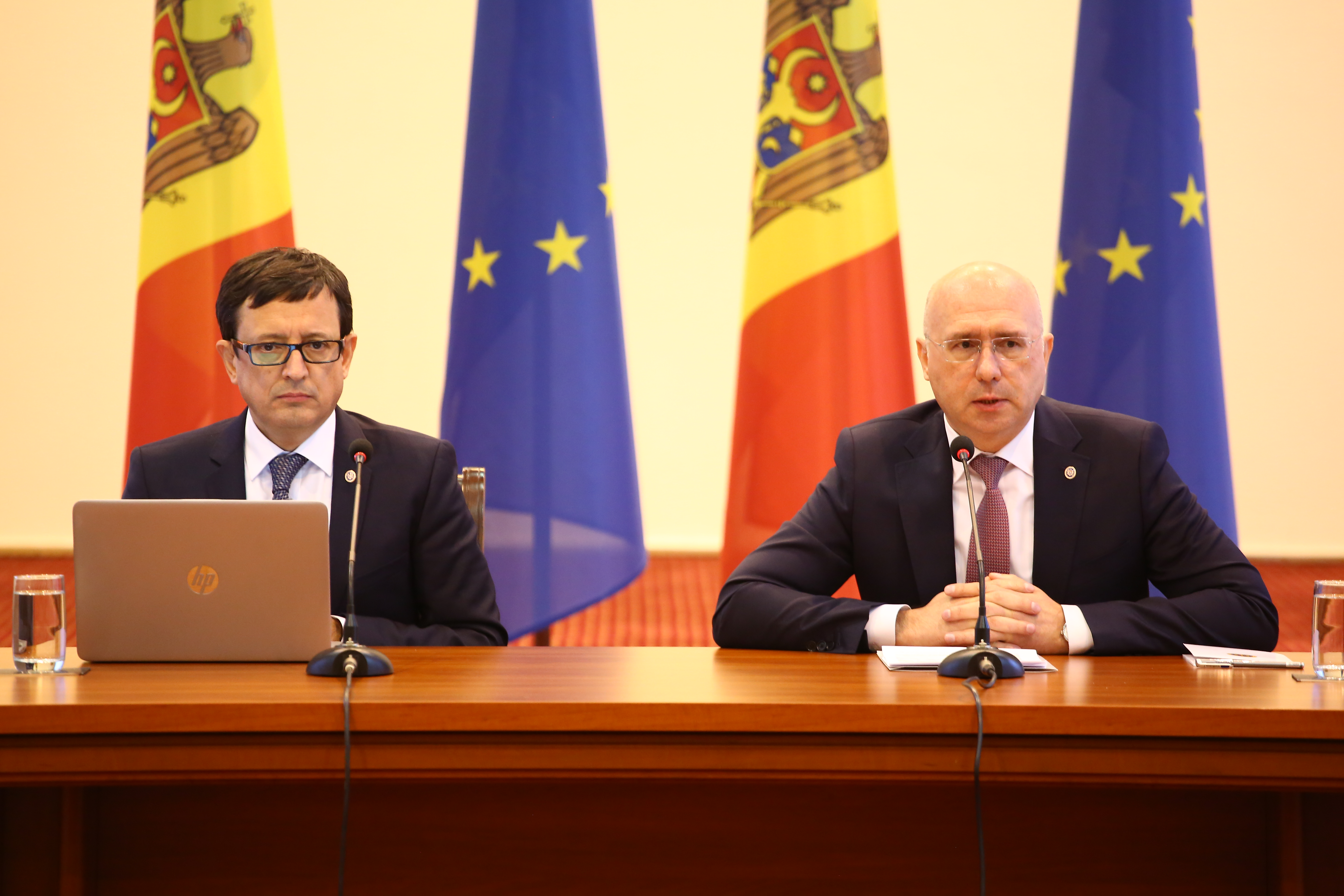
Filip with finance minister Octavian Armașu during a press briefing on 24 October 2018

In November 2017, the First House Programme was launched. The purpose of the programme is to facilitate the access of individuals to purchasing a dwelling by contracting partially state-guaranteed bank loans, especially for young families. The program has become functional in March 2018. Analysts have previously commented, that the programme advantages the owners of construction companies, thus guaranteeing them more customers. Finance minister Octavian Armașu declined then to comment on these assumptions. Until now, some 202 people have already received credits for house purchase under the "First House" programme. At the launch of the "First House II" programme on 16 May 2018, Armașu stated that one of the programme's objectives were to support young people in obtaining housing and continuing their work in the public sector.

In May 2018, the First House programme 2 is started, exclusively for civil servants who have at least one year worked in state institutions. About 5,000 public servants could conclude such contracts this year, as the state has proposed to allocate 20 million lei for this programme. The aim of the programme is to motivate young people to work in budgetary institutions.

Later in July 2018, the First House Programme is expanding to make it more accessible to families with more children. The "First Home" 3 project assume the gradual offsetting from the state budget of the mortgage loan, from 10 to 100%, depending on the number of children in the family.

The "Good Roads for Moldova" Programme

In 2018, the Government will ensure the repair and construction of 1200 km of roads in rural areas within the national programme "Good Roads for Moldova", regardless of the political color of the localities. The Government approved the budget of the "Good Roads for Moldova" programme, being allocated 972 million lei, with the repair works being carried out in over 1200 villages. The Ministry of Economy and Infrastructure launched the "Good Roads for Moldova" online map. The map contains up-to-date information for each district about the amount of work to be done, the stage of implementation of the project, how many road sections have been restored, are in work or are to be repaired, what is the volume of the investments, type of works performed, etc. The online map can be viewed on www.drumuribune.md.

Government Reform

On 26 July 2017, the Government of the Republic of Moldova entered a new stage, in the context of voting on 21 July 2017, by Parliament of the new structure of the Executive. Thus, following the transfers of competences, from 16 ministries remained 9 ministries. Government reform has generated more criticism about the process of drafting and implementing this initiative. The list of indicated ministries results from the change of name and taking over some areas of activity, as follows:

- The Ministry of Economy took over the fields of activity from the Ministry of Transport and Road Infrastructure and from the Ministry of Information Technology and Communications, as well as the construction field from the Ministry of Regional Development and Construction, with the name change in the Ministry of Economy and Infrastructure;
- The Ministry of Culture took over the fields of activity from the Ministry of Education, the Ministry of Youth and Sports and the research field from the Academy of Sciences of Moldova, with the change of the name in the Ministry of Education, Culture and Research;
- The Ministry of Labor, Social Protection and Family took over the fields of activity of the Ministry of Health, with the change of the name in the Ministry of Health, Labor and Social Protection;
- The Ministry of Regional Development and Construction took over the fields of activity from the Ministry of Agriculture and Food Industry and from the Ministry of Environment, with the change of name in the Ministry of Agriculture, Regional Development and Environment.

In the Government meeting of 30 August 2017, the Regulation for the organization and functioning of the new ministries was approved, containing the organigram, the central office structure, the areas of competence and the limit staff. From the subordination of the ministries, all state-owned or with majority state-owned capital enterprises were removed so that ministers were more focused on policies. Undertakings are in charge of the Public Property Agency, which is subordinated to the Government.

Information Technology Park "Moldova IT Park"

On 1 January 2017, Law no. 77, regarding IT parks, entered into force. On 26 October 2017, 15 ATIC companies submitted to the Ministry of Economy and Infrastructure of Moldova an application for the establishment of "Moldova IT Park". Subsequently, on 20 December 2017, the Government approved the Regulation for the organization and operation of the Park Administration and the Residents Registration Regulations.

On 1 January 2018, Moldova's First IT Park - "Moldova IT Park", founded for 10 years, was created, the period, in which it plans to attract about 400 IT companies from the Republic of Moldova. The main purpose of the new structure is to provide an organizational platform with a set of innovative mechanisms and facilities to boost the growth of the information technology industry, create new jobs and attract local and foreign investment. The administrator is appointed by the Government for a term of 5 years.

The director of the "Ritlabs" Company, Maxim Masiutin, said that the IT Park offers attractive conditions for employees who will receive the full salary indicated in the individual labor contract without any taxes. In turn, programmer Vitalie Esanu, an IT expert, said that such schemes create opportunities for corruption.

In the first four months of the launch of "Moldova IT Park" 164 residents were registered. Among the facilities and tax incentives granted to residents of IT parks, the biggest burden is, for current and potential residents, the single tax of 7% of sales revenue and the removal of bureaucratic barriers.

The advantages of the IT business environment in our country were presented in Iași, Romania, at the PinAwards regional forum. During the event, the Republic of Moldova was presented as an attractive destination for IT companies, mentioning the benefits of the law on IT Parks.

Launching the Service 112

"112" is the unique number for emergency calls, active in all EU Member States. It operates on a non-stop basis and can be called absolutely free of charge by every citizen from the fixed and mobile phones. The "112 Service" project was launched in May 2012. The new system automates all processes through state-of-the-art software. The Republic of Moldova is the second country to use this modern software. The service 112 is tasked with managing much more complex cases for rapid interventions. On 29 March 2018, the Unique National Service for Emergency Calls 112 was launched 112. Prime Minister Pavel Filip said at the launch event that "It is a beautiful project, initiated in 2012. It is a soul initiative for me. Its implementation lasted several years, yet we launch the Service nine months ahead than was expected. Through it, we will provide citizens with modern services just like in the countries of the European Union ". The Government approved the Interaction Rules between the Single National Service for Emergency Calls 112 and Emergency Specialised Services to ensure immediate intervention by rescuers, doctors or police officers to provide the necessary assistance. The Regulation provides for a clear delimitation of the duties of the 112 and Emergency Specialised Services - the Emergency Medical Service, the General Police Inspectorate and the General Emergency Inspectorate. Basic skills of the 112 Service include the reception, management and processing of emergency calls throughout the Republic of Moldova, completing emergency call records and the centralization, storage and access to managed data under the Automatized Information System of the Service 112.

Preceded by Streleț Cabinet	Cabinet of Moldova; 20 January 2016 – 8 June 2019	Succeeded by Sandu Cabinet
