= Andrei Galbur =

Moldavian diplomat and politician

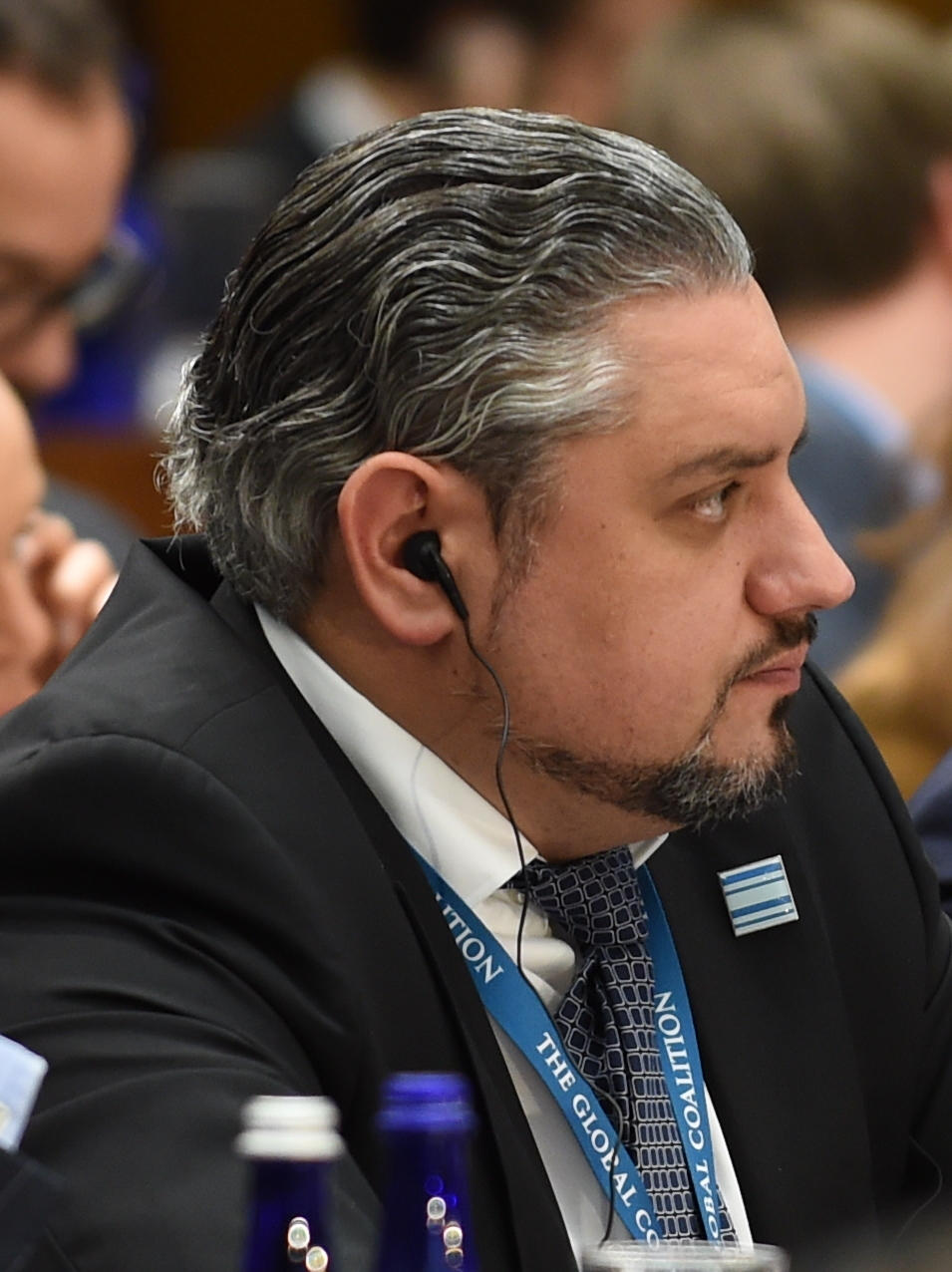
- Galbur in 2017

Deputy Prime Minister of Moldova
- In office 20 January 2016 – 21 December 2017 Serving with: Octavian Calmîc
- President: Nicolae Timofti; Igor Dodon
- Prime Minister: Pavel Filip
- Preceded by: Natalia Gherman

Minister of Foreign Affairs and European Integration
- In office 20 January 2016 – 21 December 2017
- President: Nicolae Timofti; Igor Dodon
- Prime Minister: Pavel Filip
- Preceded by: Natalia Gherman
- Succeeded by: Tudor Ulianovschi

Deputy Minister of Foreign Affairs and European Integration
- In office 11 March 2015 – 20 January 2016
- President: Nicolae Timofti
- Prime Minister: Chiril Gaburici; Natalia Gherman (acting); Valeriu Streleț; Gheorghe Brega (acting)
- Minister: Natalia Gherman

Moldovan Ambassador to Russia, Kazakhstan and Tajikistan
- In office 28 November 2012 – 27 March 2015
- President: Nicolae Timofti
- Prime Minister: Vladimir Filat; Iurie Leancă; Chiril Gaburici
- Preceded by: Andrei Neguța
- Succeeded by: Dumitru Braghiș

Personal details
- Born: 5 July 1975 (age 51) Chișinău, Moldavian SSR, Soviet Union (now Moldova)
- Party: Independent
- Education: Free International University of Moldova

Andrei Galbur (born 5 July 1975) is a Moldovan former politician and diplomat. He served as Deputy Prime Minister, Minister of Foreign Affairs and European Integration (from 20 January 2016 to 20 December 2017) in Prime Minister Pavel Filip's cabinet. Previously Galbur served as Deputy Minister of Foreign Affairs and European Integration (2015–2016), and Ambassador of Moldova to Russia (2013–2015).

== Education ==
In 1997, he graduated from the Legal Department of the International Free University of Moldova. In 1998, he graduated from the Diplomatic Academy of Vienna.

== Biography ==
- Since 1995, the attaché, and since 1997 the second secretary, and since 1999 the Councillor of the General Board for Europe and North America;
- From 2000 to 2004 Permanent Secretary at the Embassy of the Republic of Moldova in the Austrian Republic and in parallel, the deputy of the permanent representative at the international organizations in Vienna;
- From 2004 to 2005 the Head of the General Directorate for International Security;
- From 2005 to 2007, the Head of the Division for Multi-Country Co-operation;
- Since 2007, the Minister – Councillor, the deputy of the Ambassador, Chargé d'affaires a.i. of the Embassy of the Republic of Moldova in the United States;
- From September 2010 to June 2013, the head of the General Directorate for Multi-Country Cooperation;
- From January 2013 to March 2015, the Ambassador of the Republic of Moldova in the Russian Federation;
- From March 2015 to January 2016 the Deputy Minister of Foreign Affairs and European Integration;
- Since 20 January 2016 the first deputy Prime-Minister, and the Minister of Foreign Affairs and European Integration.

== See also ==
- List of foreign ministers in 2017

Political offices
Preceded by Natalia Gherman	First Deputy Prime Minister of Moldova; 2016–2017	Incumbent
Preceded by Natalia Gherman	Minister of Foreign Affairs and European Integration; 2016–2017	Incumbent
