= Pavel Filip =

Prime Minister of Moldova from 2016 to 2019

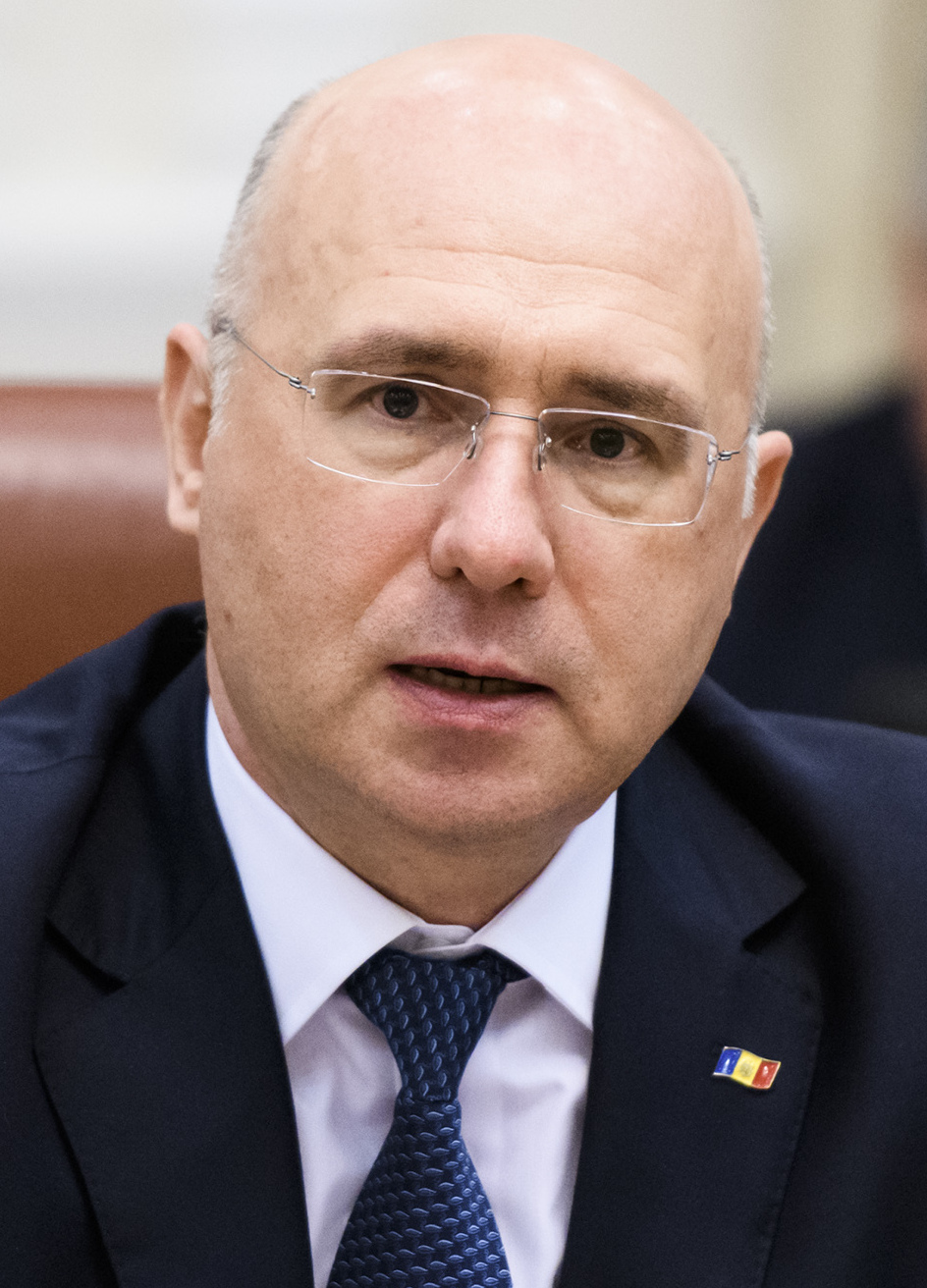
- Filip in 2018

12th Prime Minister of Moldova
- In office 20 January 2016 – 8 June 2019
- President: Nicolae Timofti; Igor Dodon
- Deputy: See list: Octavian Calmîc Andrei Galbur Gheorghe Bălan Gheorghe Brega Iurie Leancă Cristina Lesnic
- Preceded by: Gheorghe Brega (acting)
- Succeeded by: Maia Sandu

President of the Democratic Party
- In office 7 September 2019 – 30 October 2021
- Preceded by: Vlad Plahotniuc
- Succeeded by: Monica Babuc (acting)

Member of the Moldovan Parliament
- In office 9 March 2019 – 23 July 2021
- Parliamentary group: Democratic Party
- Constituency: Strășeni
- Majority: 13,047 (45.6%)
- In office 9 December 2014 – 18 February 2015
- Succeeded by: Eufrosinia Grețu
- Parliamentary group: Democratic Party
- In office 28 November 2010 – 14 January 2011
- Succeeded by: Oleg Sîrbu
- Parliamentary group: Democratic Party

Minister of Information Technology and Communications
- In office 14 January 2011 – 20 January 2016
- President: Marian Lupu (acting); Nicolae Timofti
- Prime Minister: Vladimir Filat; Iurie Leancă; Chiril Gaburici; Natalia Gherman (acting); Valeriu Streleț; Gheorghe Brega (acting)
- Preceded by: Alexandru Oleinic
- Succeeded by: Vasile Botnari

Personal details
- Born: 10 April 1966 (age 60) Pănășești, Moldavian SSR, Soviet Union (now Moldova)
- Citizenship: Moldova; Romania
- Party: European Social Democratic Party (PSDE)
- Other political affiliations: Alliance for European; Integration (2009–2013); Pro-European Coalition (2013–2015); Political Alliance for a European Moldova (2015); Alliance for European; Integration III (2015–present)
- Spouse: Tatiana Filip
- Children: 2 sons
- Education: Technical University of Moldova; IMI-NOVA International Management Institute

Pavel Filip (born 10 April 1966) is a Moldovan politician.

In 2001–2008 he was the director of the Joint-stock company Bucuria SA and in 2008–2011, general manager of Tutun-CTC joint stock company. He was then Minister of Information and Communication Technology in the Governments headed by Filat (2), Leancă, Gaburici, and Streleț since 14 January 2011 when he replaced Alexandru Oleinic (2009–2011) and by his investment at the prime minister position on 20 January 2016. He was the deputy chairman of the Democrat Party (DPM). On 7 September 2019 at the IXth Congress of the DPM was elected for the position of the chairman of the Party.

During 2019 Moldovan constitutional crisis from 9 to 15 June, Filip was acting president of Moldova.

== Education ==
Between 1983 and 1990, he studied at the Polytechnic Institute of Chișinău. He got the qualification of the mechanical engineer. Then, he changed his specialization and, in 1991–1996, he got the bachelor's degree in International Management from the International Management Institute in Chișinău.

== Professional activity ==
- 1991–1993, Head of Compressor Division of JSC "Bucuria"
- 1993–1994, Director of the Production Department JSC "Bucuria"
- 1998–2001, Chief Engineer of JSC "Bucuria", Deputy General Manager for Production and Technology Issues
- 2001–2008, General Manager of JSC "Bucuria"
- 2008–2011, General Manager of SC "TUTUN-CTC"

== Political activity ==
In 2010, Pavel Filip joined the Democratic Party of Moldova (PDM), because of which he was included in the candidates' list for the early parliamentary elections of 28 November 2010. Prior to joining the Democratic Party, according to the Liberal Democratic Party of Moldova (PLDM) leader, Vlad Filat, within „In depth” TV program (October 2007), Pavel Filip took a part of the initiative group for the PLDM establishing, together with other personalities.

Pavel Filip began his political career on 14 January 2011, when he was appointed as minister of the Ministry of Information Technology and Communications.

=== Prime minister ===
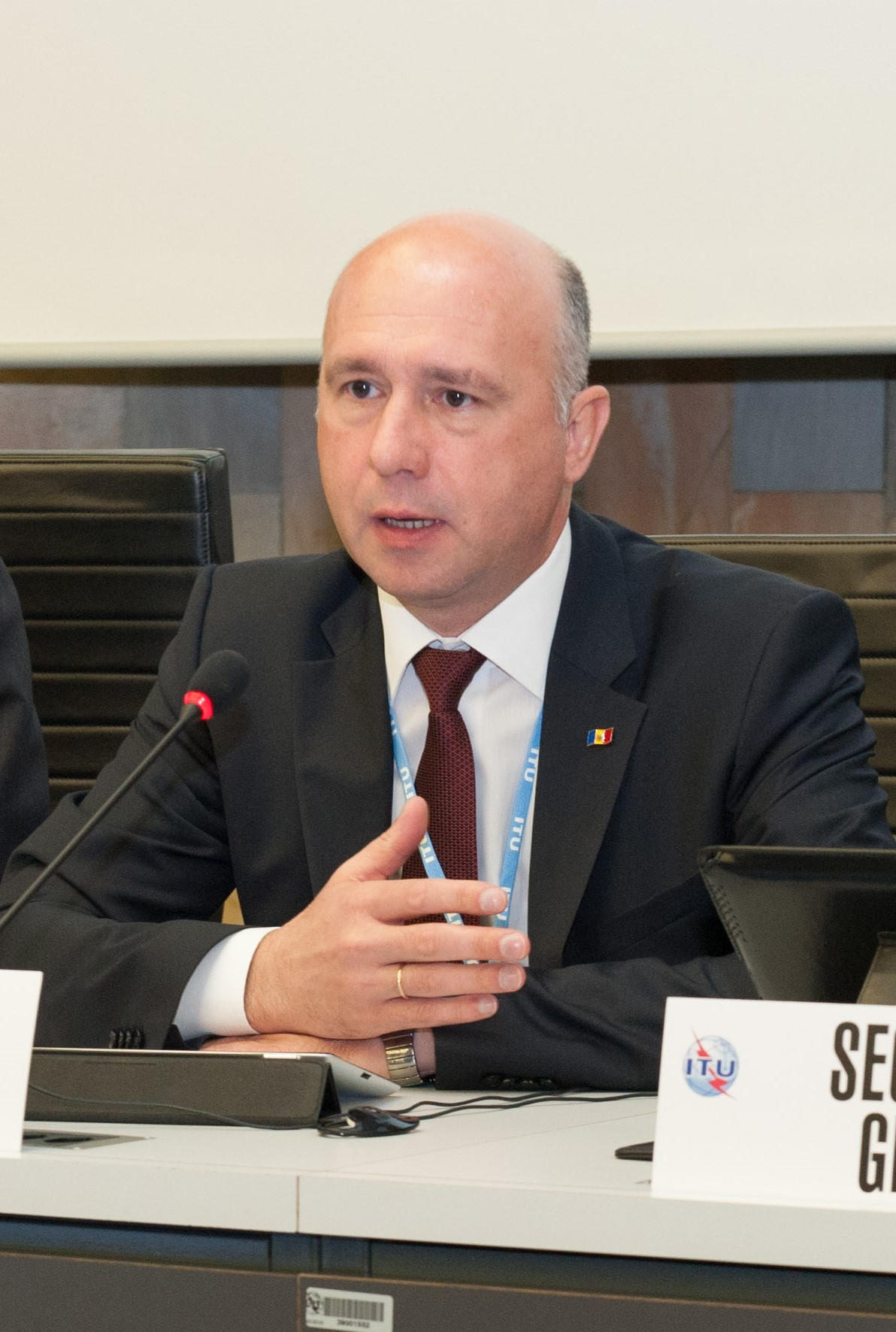

On 14 January 2016, when the candidature of Vladimir Plahotniuc (from the PDM side) for the prime-minister position of the Republic of Moldova was rejected, the President Nicolae Timofti has appointed the Secretary General of the President's Office, Ion Păduraru, as candidate for the position of the prime minister. Instantly, one some media agencies have wrote that Păduraru's name appears in the Vlad Filat dossier, more precisely in Ilan Shor's self-denouncing statement. The next day, less than 12 hours after President Nicolae Timofti has appointed the Păduraru candidature for the prime minister position, the PDM leader, Marian Lupu submitted a request stating that the party did not agree with Păduraru's designation and demanded the revocation of the presidential decree on the candidate with the promise that a candidate's short list will be submitted in the near future, and shortly, he submitted his own candidate for the prime minister position, and namely, Pavel Filip, deputy chairman of the PDM and Minister of Information Technology and Communications. In a little while, Ion Păduraru announced that he was withdrawing his candidacy from the post of prime minister in favor of Pavel Filip, and according to other sources, President Nicolae Timofti cancelled the appointment decree of his counsellor Ion Păduaru as candidate for the position of prime minister. After that, the President had designated Pavel Filip as candidate for prime minister position, motivating that he made this decision "following the proposal made by the parliamentary majority of 55 MPs."

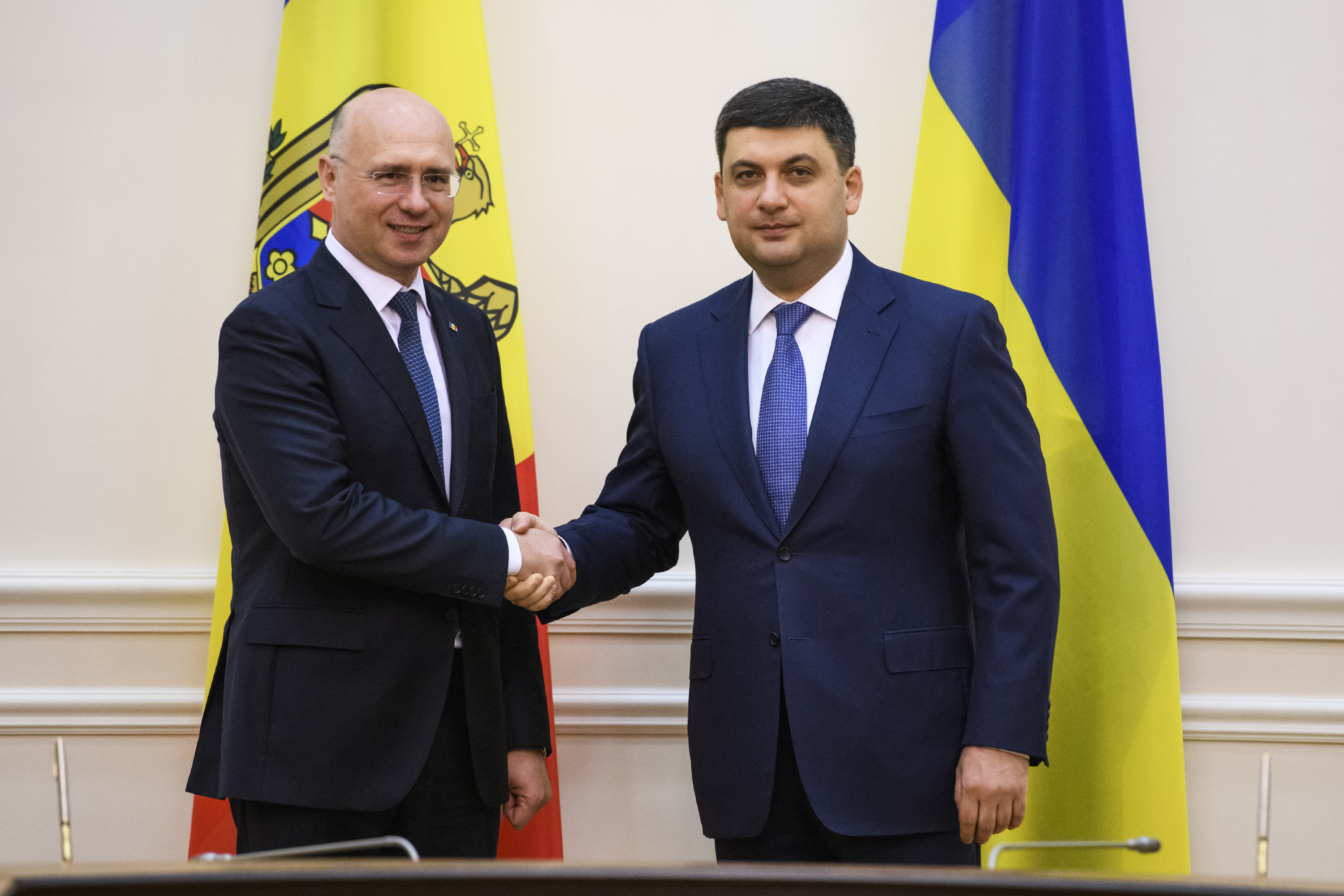
Filip with Ukrainian prime minister Volodymyr Groysman in Kyiv, 12 April 2018

The Pavel Filip's government was voted and invested in office despite popular protests held on 20 January 2016, after 16 PM, with the vote of 57 deputies out of 101, without finalizing the presentation of the government program and skipping the questions and answers part, because of the PSRM MPs' protest that held with the parliamentary tribune blocking, which generated a scandal. The new Cabinet of Ministers took the oath in front of the President Nicolae Timofti close to midnight.

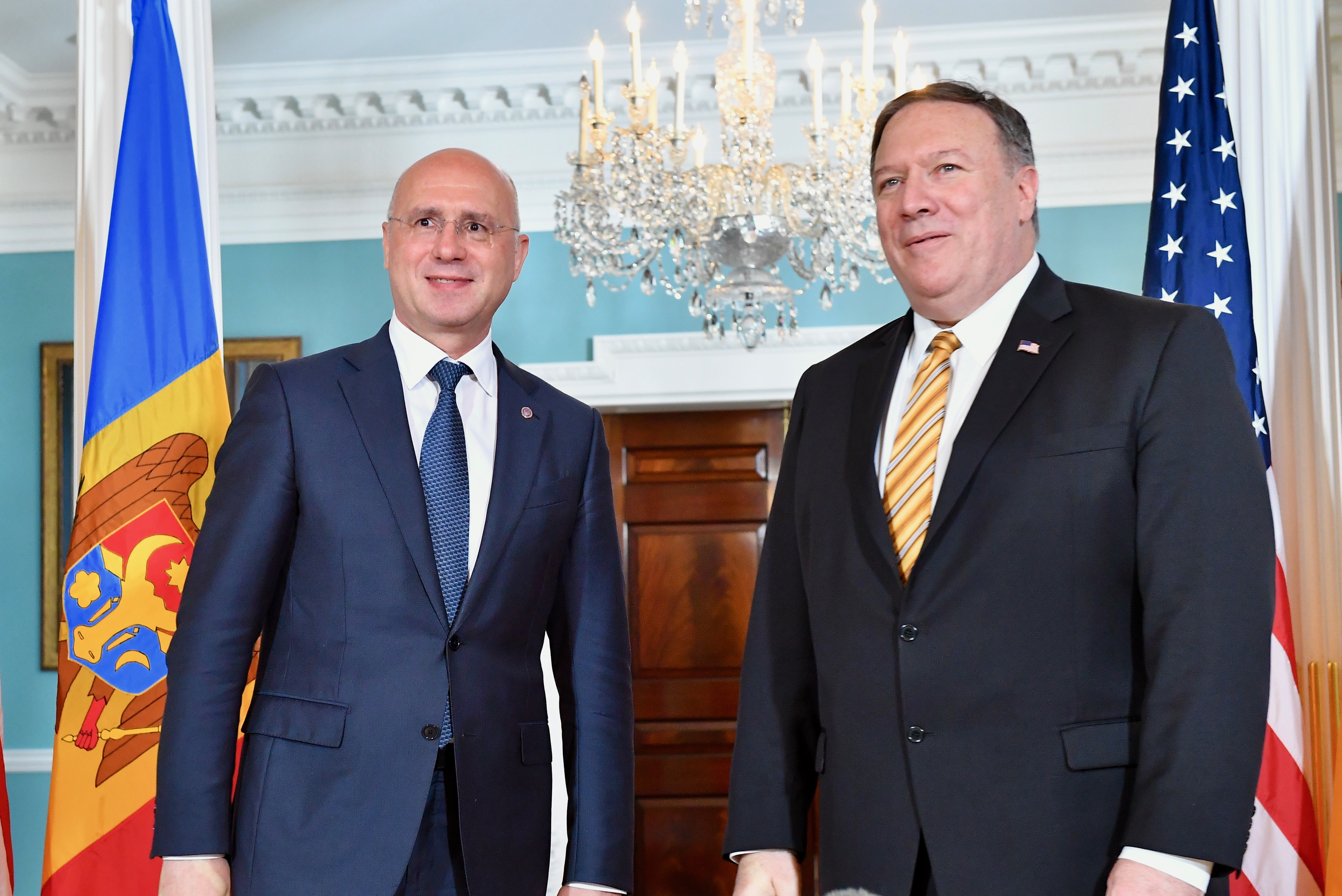
Filip with U.S. Secretary of State Mike Pompeo in Washington, D.C. 25 June 2018

According to the polls made in 2019 related to the most respected politicians of the Republic of Moldova, Pavel Filip has only 3,5% of trust. In other polls he is placed at the fourth position and fifth position.

In June 2019, the government of Prime Minister Pavel Filip resigned. He was succeeded by Moldova's new prime minister, Maia Sandu.

== Personal life ==
He is married to Tatiana Filip, and has two sons. In addition to Romanian language, he is fluent in Russian and English.

== Awards ==
In 2013, he was awarded the Medal of the International Telecommunication Union – for the contribution in building of the information society. On 23 July 2014 President Nicolae Timofti awarded him the Order of Work Glory as a sign of high appreciation of the contribution to the promotion of the reforms based on European values and standards, for special merits in ensuring the negotiation, signing and ratification of the Association Agreement between the Republic of Moldova and the European Union, the contribution to visa liberalization with the EU Member States and the Schengen Area, and strong efforts in increasing the international prestige of the country.

Political offices
Preceded by Gheorghe Brega; Acting	Prime Minister of Moldova; 2016–2019	Succeeded by Maia Sandu
