= Octavian Calmîc =

Moldovan politician (born 1974)

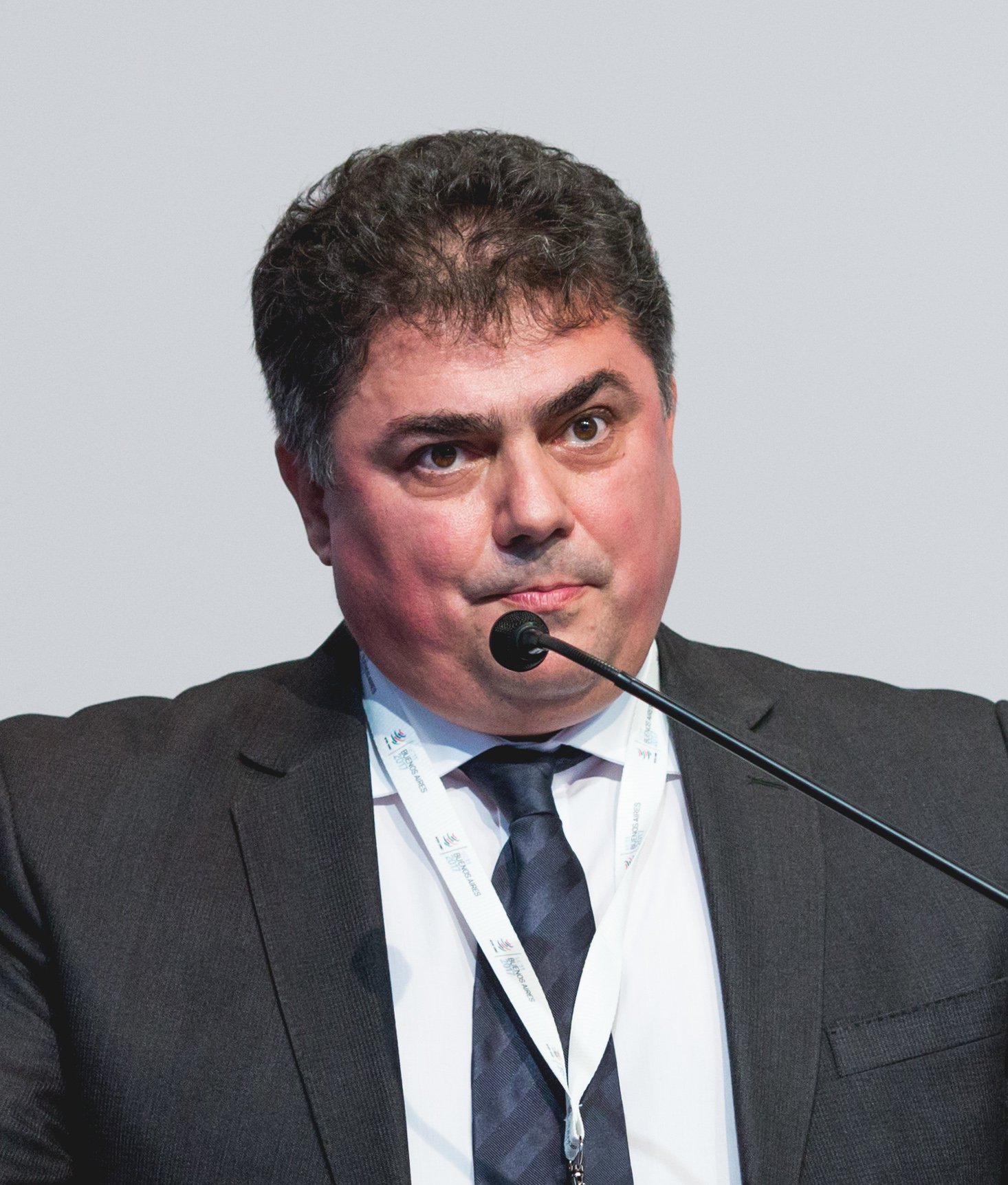
- Calmîc in 2017

Deputy Prime Minister of Moldova
- In office 20 January 2016 – 21 December 2017 Serving with: Andrei Galbur
- President: Nicolae Timofti; Igor Dodon
- Prime Minister: Pavel Filip
- Preceded by: Stéphane Christophe Bridé

Minister of Economy
- In office 20 January 2016 – 21 December 2017
- President: Nicolae Timofti; Igor Dodon
- Prime Minister: Pavel Filip
- Preceded by: Stéphane Christophe Bridé
- Succeeded by: Chiril Gaburici (as Minister of Economy and Infrastructure)

Deputy Minister of Economy
- In office 4 November 2009 – 20 January 2016
- President: Mihai Ghimpu (acting); Vlad Filat (acting); Marian Lupu (acting); Nicolae Timofti
- Prime Minister: Vlad Filat; Iurie Leancă; Chiril Gaburici; Natalia Gherman (acting); Valeriu Streleț; Gheorghe Brega (acting)
- Minister: Valeriu Lazăr; Andrian Candu; Stéphane Christophe Bridé

Personal details
- Born: 9 October 1974 (age 51) Bardar, Moldavian SSR, Soviet Union
- Education: Moldova State University; Academy of Economic Studies of Moldova

Octavian Calmîc (born 9 October 1974) is a former Moldovan politician. He served as Minister of Economy and Infrastructure from 20 January 2016 to 21 December 2017.

Political offices
Preceded by Stéphane Christophe Bridé	Minister of Economy and Infrastructure; 2016–2017	Succeeded by Chiril Gaburici
