= Streleț Cabinet =

Government of Moldova

The Streleț Cabinet was the Cabinet of Moldova from 30 July to 29 October 2015. It consisted of ministers from the Liberal Democratic Party (PLDM), the Democratic Party (PDM) and the Liberal Party (PL), who together formed the Alliance for European Integration III. The Cabinet was installed after a successful vote of confidence held in the Parliament of Moldova on 30 July 2015. It was dismissed by Parliament on 29 October amid ongoing protests, lasting 3 months. A new cabinet was formed only on 20 January 2016; until then the Deputy Prime Minister for Social Affairs Gheorghe Brega was acting Prime Minister.

== History ==
After that, on 12 June 2015, when the former Prime Minister Chiril Gaburici announced his resignation, followed by the resignation of the entire Gaburici Cabinet, the three pro-European parliamentary parties, LDPM, DPM and LP formed the Alliance for European Integration III and agreed to form a new government. Although for the post of prime minister was initially proposed Maia Sandu, was eventually named liberal-democrat Valeriu Streleț. In the new government, as compared to the previous Cabinet Gaburici, LDPM and DPM have given up some ministries that have passed to subordination of the LP, a new vice minister's portfolio was set up, which will deal with social issues and return LP, and the LDPM and LP have made a castling with the Ministry of Health and the Ministry of Labor, Social Protection and Family, together with the ministers, Mircea Buga and Ruxanda Glavan. On 29 October 2015 the Government of Streleţ was dismissed by a motion of no confidence. Thus, all ministers entered the interim function, fulfilling only the functions of managing public affairs, until the appointment of a new Cabinet of Ministers. The motion of no confidence of the Streleț Cabinet was filed in Parliament on 22 October (2015), being signed by 42 PSRM and PCRM deputies, its basis being "suspicions of corruption" and "the detachment of the prime minister from his office by exposing in favor of Vladimir Filat. After that parliamentary session was closed for lack of quorum, the motion would be examined at the next meeting on 29 October. To dismiss the government, a simple majority was needed: the vote of 51 out of 101 deputies. At the meeting of October 29, Streleţ government was dismissed with the vote of 65 deputies of the factions of the DPM, PCRM and PSRM, only 18 LDPM deputies voted against.

== Composition ==
The Cabinet consisted of the Prime Minister of Moldova Valeriu Streleț, four Deputy Prime Ministers, 14 other ministers, and two ex officio members.

=== Ministers ===
Title	Image	Name	Party	Term start	Term end
Prime Minister		Valeriu Streleț	PLDM	30 July 2015	30 October 2015
Deputy Prime Minister, Minister of Economy		Stéphane Christophe Bridé	PDM	18 February 2015	20 January 2016
Deputy Prime Minister, Minister of Foreign Affairs and European Integration		Natalia Gherman	PLDM	30 July 2015	20 January 2016
Deputy Prime Minister for Reintegration		Victor Osipov	PDM	18 February 2015	20 January 2016
Deputy Prime Minister for Social Affairs		Gheorghe Brega	PL	30 July 2015	30 May 2017
Minister of Finance		Anatol Arapu	PLDM	14 August 2013	20 January 2016
Minister of Justice		Vladimir Cebotari	PDM	30 July 2015	21 December 2017
Minister of Internal Affairs		Oleg Balan	PLDM	18 February 2015	20 January 2016
Minister of Defence		Anatol Șalaru	PL	30 July 2015	27 December 2016
Minister of Regional Development and Construction		Vasile Bîtca	PDM	18 February 2015	25 July 2017
Minister of Agriculture and Food Industry		Ion Sula	PLDM	18 February 2015	20 January 2016
Minister of Transport and Roads Infrastructure		Iurie Chirinciuc	PL	30 July 2015	30 May 2017
Minister of Environment		Valeriu Munteanu	PL	30 July 2015	30 May 2017
Minister of Education		Corina Fusu	PL	30 July 2015	30 May 2017
Minister of Culture		Monica Babuc	PDM	30 May 2013	25 July 2017
Minister of Labor, Social Protection and Family		Mircea Buga	PLDM	30 July 2015	20 January 2016
Minister of Health		Ruxanda Glavan	PDM	30 July 2015	25 July 2017
Minister of Youth and Sport		Loretta Handrabura	PLDM	30 July 2015	20 January 2016
Minister of Information Technology and Communications		Pavel Filip	PDM	14 January 2011	20 January 2016

=== Ex officio members ===
The Başkan (Governor) of Gagauzia is elected by universal, equal, direct, secret and free suffrage on an alternative basis for a term of 4 years. One and the same person can be a governor for no more than two consecutive terms. The Başkan of Gagauzia is confirmed as a member of the Moldovan government by a decree of the President of Moldova.

Title	Image	Name	Party	Term start	Term end
Governor of Gagauzia		Irina Vlah	Independent	30 July 2015	18 July 2013
President of the Academy of Sciences of Moldova		Gheorghe Duca	Independent	24 August 2004	28 November 2018

Preceded by Gaburici Cabinet	Cabinet of Moldova; 30 July 2015 – 20 January 2016	Succeeded by Filip Cabinet
