= Tutun =

Tutun may refer to:

- Tebtunis, Egyptian city
- Turkish tobacco, also called Oriental tobacco
- TUTUN-CTC, a tobacco factory in Chişinău, Moldova
