= Gaburici Cabinet =

Government of Moldova

The Gaburici Cabinet was the Cabinet of Moldova from 18 February to 30 July 2015. It consisted of ministers from the Liberal Democratic Party (PLDM) and the Democratic Party (PDM), who together formed the Political Alliance for a European Moldova. The Cabinet was installed after a successful vote of confidence held in the Parliament of Moldova on 18 February 2015. It was a minority government.

== Composition ==
The Cabinet consisted of the Prime Minister of Moldova Chiril Gaburici, three Deputy Prime Ministers, 14 other ministers, and two ex officio members.

=== Ministers ===
Title	Image	Name	Party	Term start	Term end
Prime Minister		Chiril Gaburici	Independent (affiliated to PLDM)	18 February 2015	22 June 2015
Deputy Prime Minister, Minister of Economy		Stéphane Christophe Bridé	PDM	18 February 2015	20 January 2016
Deputy Prime Minister, Minister of Foreign Affairs and European Integration		Natalia Gherman	PLDM	31 May 2013	20 January 2016
Deputy Prime Minister for Reintegration		Victor Osipov	PDM	18 February 2015	20 January 2016
Minister of Finance		Anatol Arapu	PLDM	14 August 2013	20 January 2016
Minister of Justice		Vladimir Grosu	PLDM	18 February 2015	30 July 2015
Minister of Internal Affairs		Oleg Balan	PLDM	18 February 2015	20 January 2016
Minister of Defense		Viorel Cibotaru	PLDM	18 February 2015	30 July 2015
Minister of Regional Development and Construction		Vasile Bîtca	PDM	18 February 2015	25 July 2017
Minister of Agriculture and Food Industry		Ion Sula	PLDM	18 February 2015	20 January 2016
Minister of Transport and Roads Infrastructure		Vasile Botnari	PDM	31 May 2013	30 July 2015
Minister of Environment		Sergiu Palihovici	PLDM	18 February 2015	30 July 2015
Minister of Education		Maia Sandu	PLDM	24 July 2012	30 July 2015
Minister of Culture		Monica Babuc	PDM	31 May 2013	25 July 2017
Minister of Labour, Social Protection and Family		Ruxanda Glavan	PDM	18 February 2015	30 July 2015
Minister of Health		Mircea Buga	PLDM	18 February 2015	30 July 2015
Minister of Youth and Sport		Serghei Afanasenco	PDM	18 February 2015	30 July 2015
Minister of Information Technology and Communications		Pavel Filip	PDM	14 January 2011	20 January 2016

=== Ex officio members ===
The Başkan (Governor) of Gagauzia is elected by universal, equal, direct, secret and free suffrage on an alternative basis for a term of 4 years. One and the same person can be a governor for no more than two consecutive terms. The Başkan of Gagauzia is confirmed as a member of the Moldovan government by a decree of the President of Moldova.

Title	Image	Name	Party	Term start	Term end
Governor of Gagauzia		Mihail Formuzal	PRM	29 December 2006	23 March 2015
Governor of Gagauzia		Irina Vlah	Independent	23 March 2015	18 July 2023
President of the Academy of Sciences of Moldova		Gheorghe Duca	Independent	24 August 2004	28 November 2018

Preceded by Leancă Cabinet	Cabinet of Moldova; 18 February 2015 – 30 July 2015	Succeeded by Streleț Cabinet
