= Gheorghe Bălan =

Moldovan politician (born 1975)

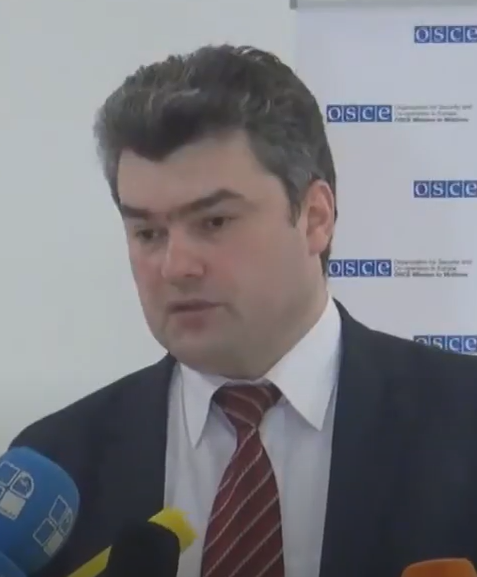
- Bălan in 2016

Secretary of State of the Ministry of Internal Affairs
- In office 26 July 2019 – 10 August 2021
- President: Igor Dodon; Maia Sandu
- Prime Minister: Maia Sandu; Ion Chicu; Aureliu Ciocoi (acting); Natalia Gavrilița
- Minister: Andrei Năstase; Pavel Voicu; Ana Revenco

Deputy Prime Minister of Moldova for Reintegration
- In office 20 January 2016 – 21 December 2017
- President: Nicolae Timofti; Igor Dodon
- Prime Minister: Pavel Filip
- Preceded by: Victor Osipov
- Succeeded by: Cristina Lesnic

Personal details
- Born: Chișinău, Moldavian SSR, Soviet Union

Gheorghe Bălan (born 25 August 1975) is a Moldovan politician. He served as Deputy Prime Minister for Reintegration in the Filip Cabinet from 2016 until 2017.
