= Florești, Moldova =

Florești
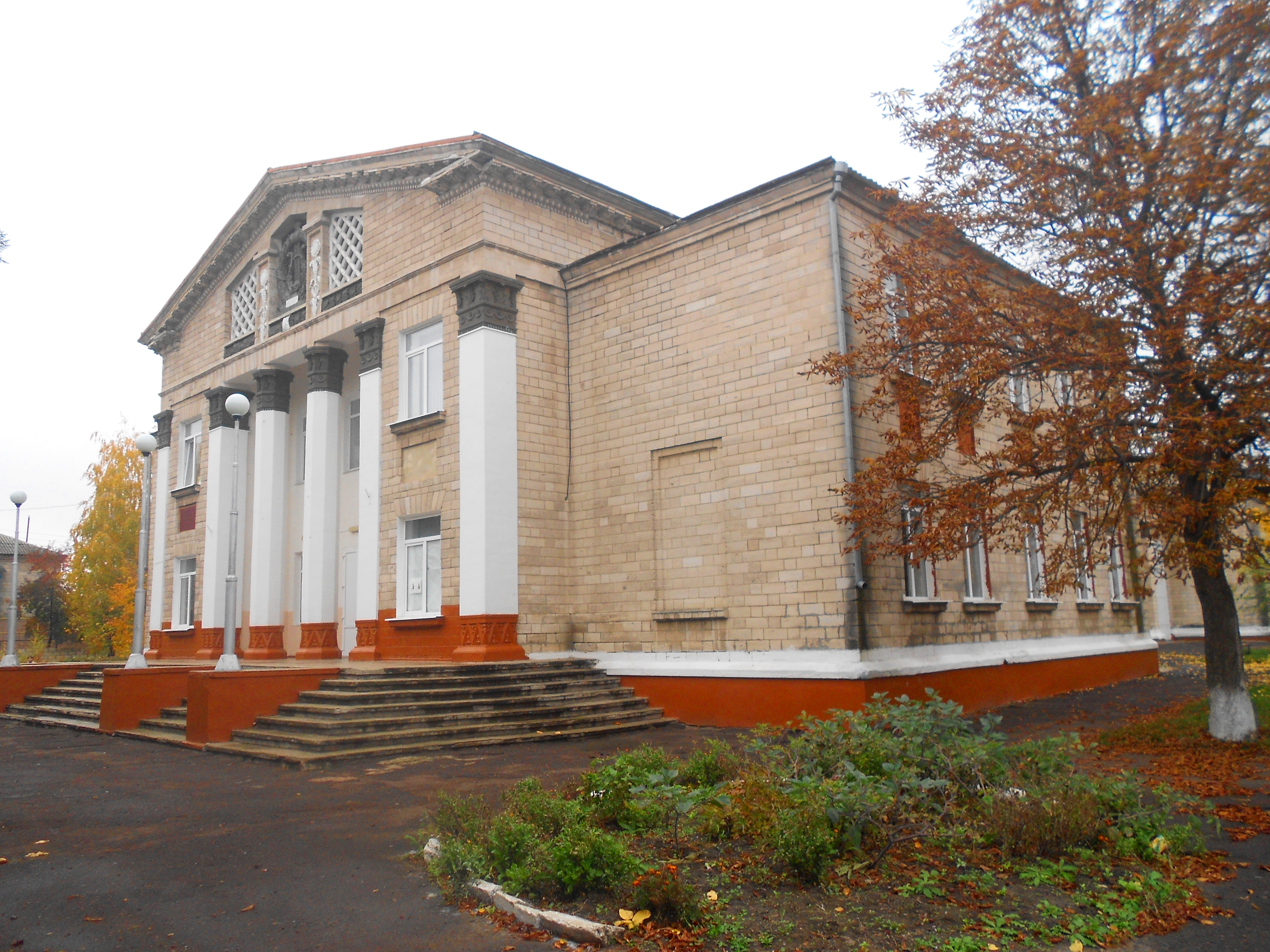
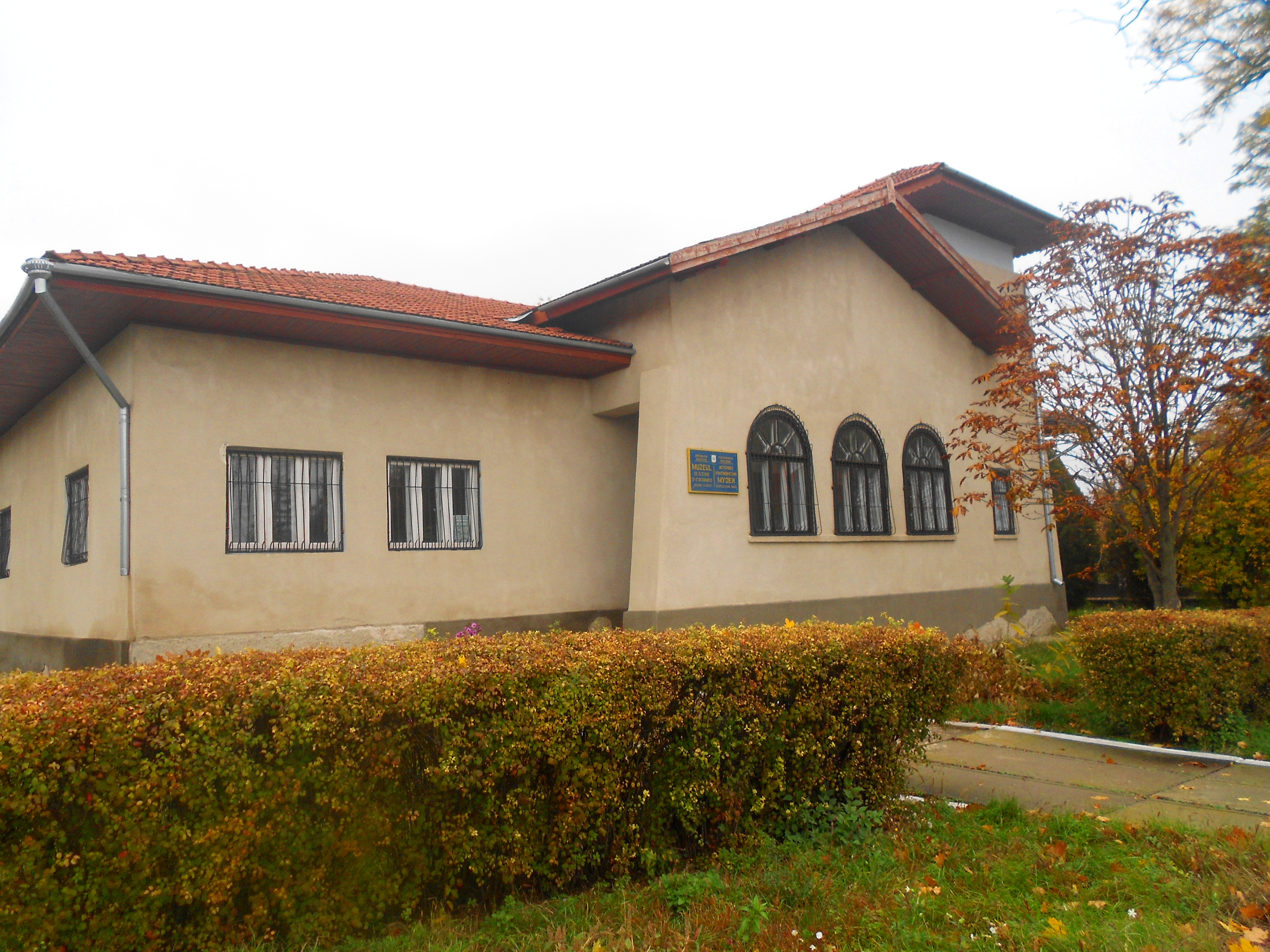
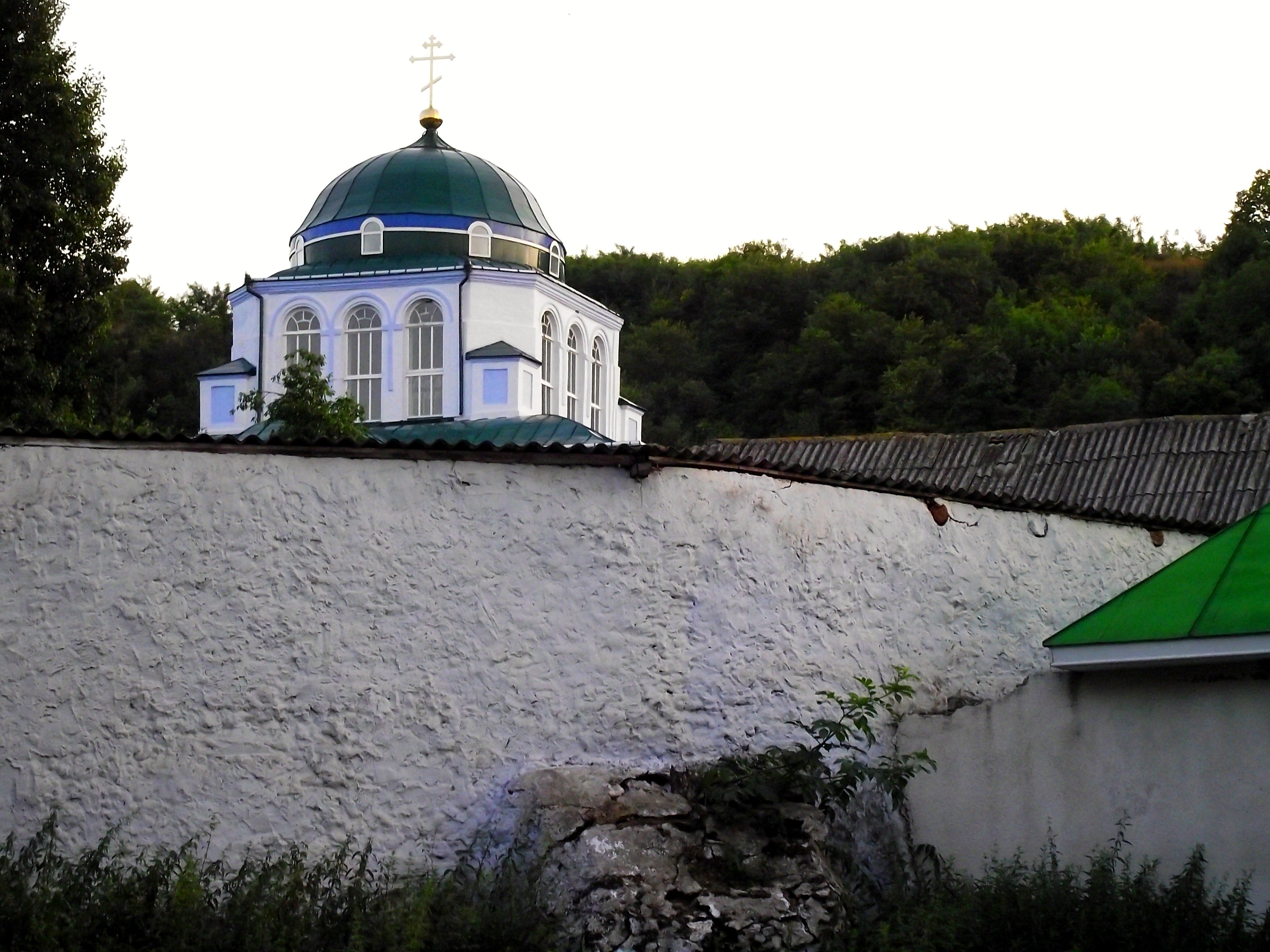
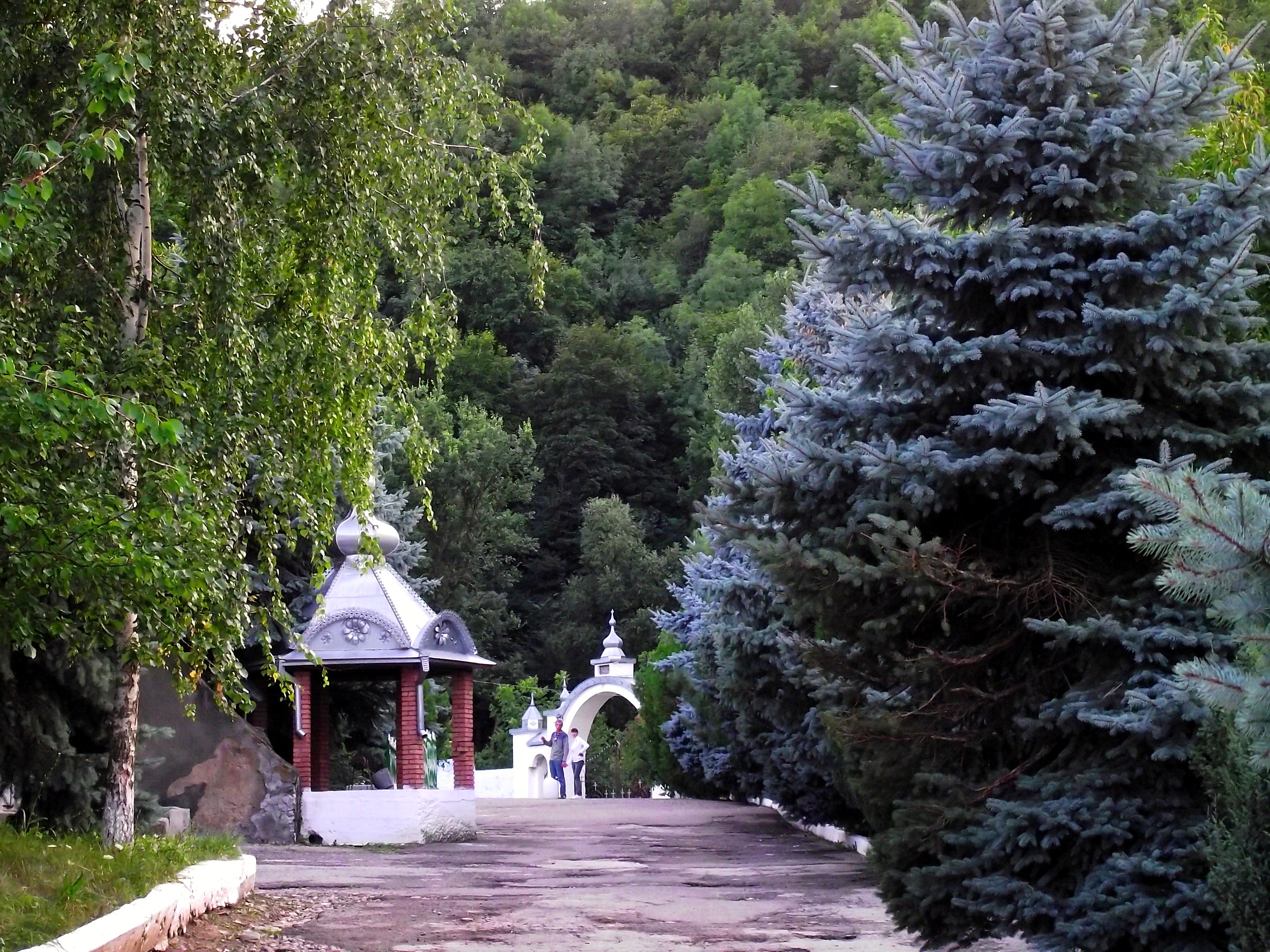
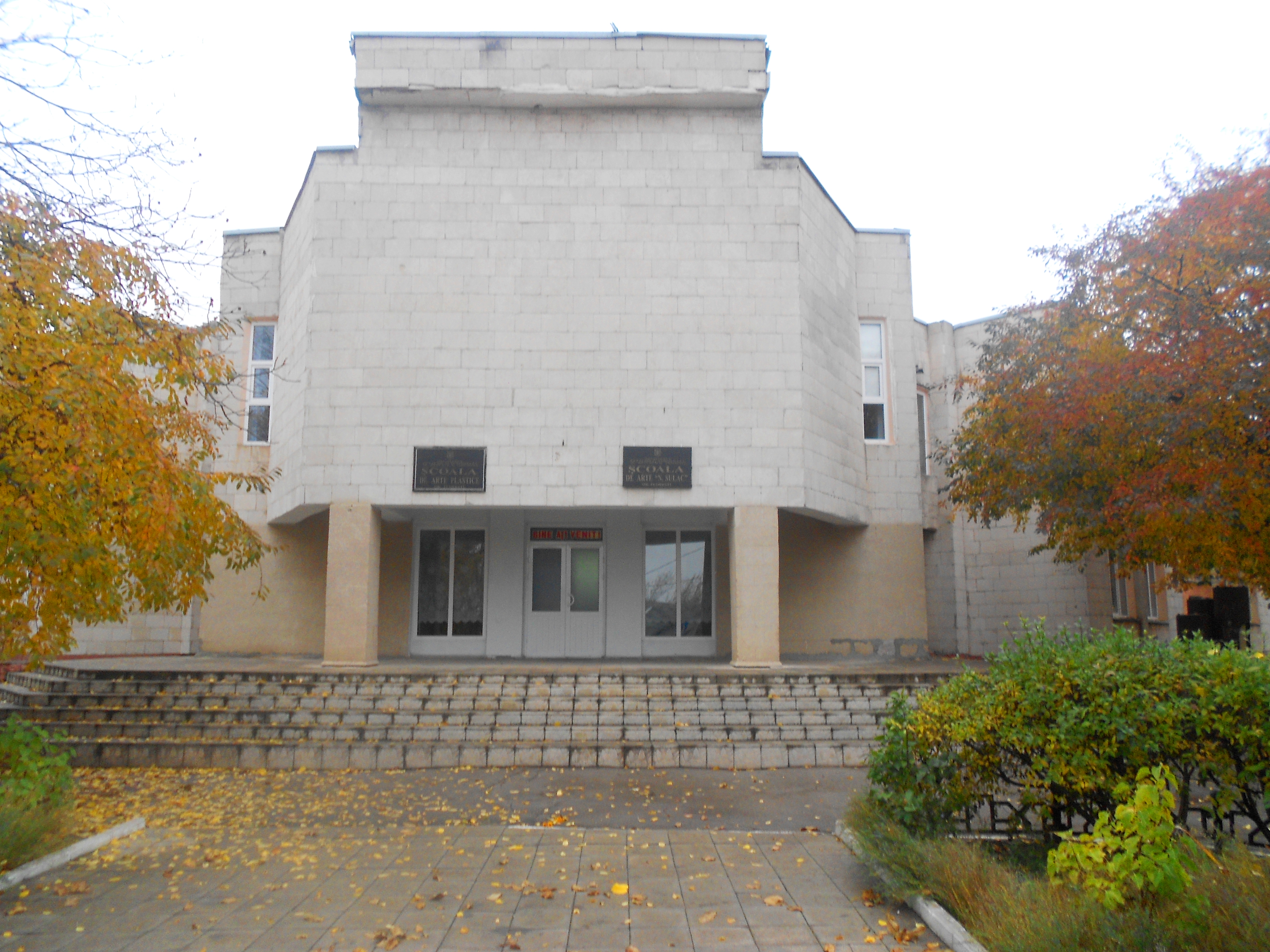
- Florești

- Flag Seal

- Location within Moldova
- Coordinates: 47°53′36″N 28°18′05″E
- Country: Moldova
- County: Floreşti District
- Founded: 20 August 1588

Government
  - Mayor: Iurie Gangan

Area
  - Total: 15.12 km^{2} (5.84 sq mi)
- Elevation: 88 m (289 ft)

Population (2014)
  - Total: 11,998
  - Density: 793.5/km^{2} (2,055/sq mi)
- Time zone: UTC+2 (EET)
  - Summer (DST): UTC+3 (EEST)
- Postal code: (MD-)5001–5002
- Area code: +373 250
- Climate: Dfb

Florești (Romanian pronunciation: [floˈreʃtʲ]) is the capital city and industrial and commercial center of Floreşti District of Moldova. It is located on the river Răut.

== Name ==
The name comes from the Romanian word floare ("flower"). The old name of the settlement was Rădiul Florilor, which is also a derivative from the Romanian word for "flower".

== Geography ==
The city is located in the north of the country, on the river Răut, a tributary of the Dniester.

== Politics and administration ==
Florești is governed by the City Council and the City Mayor (Romanian: Primar), both elected once every four years. The current mayor is Iurie Ţap.

== Demographics ==
According to the 2024 census, 10,925 inhabitants lived in Florești, a decrease compared to the previous census in 2014, when 11,998 inhabitants were registered.

Ethnic composition of Florești (2024)
1. Moldovans (Note: There is an ongoing controversy regarding the ethnic identification of Moldovans and Romanians.) (89.6%)
2. Romanians (4.70%)
3. Ukrainians (2.90%)
4. Russians (1.90%)
5. Others (0.80%)
Linguistic composition of Florești (2024)
1. Moldovan (Note: In March 2023, the Parliament of Moldova passed a law updating all legislative texts and the constitution to refer to the national language as Romanian, effectively rendering the term "Moldovan" obsolete.) (62.8%)
2. Romanian (28.2%)
3. Russian (7.30%)
4. Ukrainian (1.40%)
5. Other (0.40%)

Historical population
Year	Pop.	±%
1959	4,467	—
1970	11,479	+157.0%
1979	14,329	+24.8%
1989	18,228	+27.2%
2004	13,164	−27.8%
2014	11,998	−8.9%
2024	10,925	−8.9%

== Notable people ==
- Vitalie Ciobanu
- Victor Ciobanu (born 1992), world champion wrestler
- Nicolae Timofti
- Tudor Ulianovschi
- Avraham Granot
- Valentin Tsvetkov

== Gallery ==
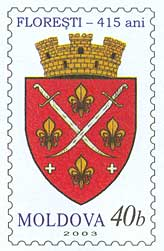
The first historical mention of Floreşti dates to 1588

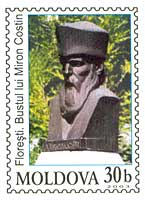
Miron Costin
