= Țareuca =

- Commune
- Location in Moldova
- Coordinates: 47°45′N 28°53′E
- Country: Moldova
- District: Rezina District

Population (2014)
  - Total: 2,627
- Time zone: UTC+2 (EET)
  - Summer (DST): UTC+3 (EEST)

Țareuca is a commune in Rezina District, Moldova. It is composed of two villages, Țahnăuți and Țareuca.

== Notable people ==
- Valeriu Streleț
