= Stéphane Christophe Bridé =

French-Moldavian economist

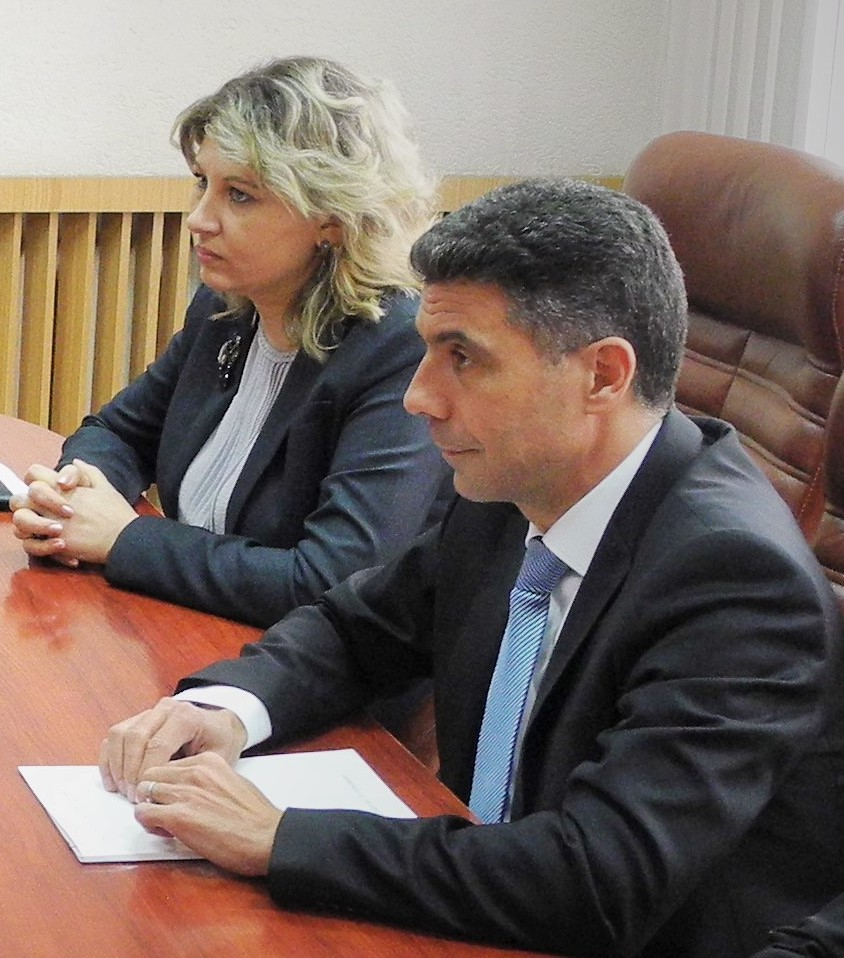
- Bridé in 2015

Deputy Prime Minister of Moldova
- In office 18 February 2015 – 20 January 2016 Serving with Natalia Gherman
- President: Nicolae Timofti
- Prime Minister: Chiril Gaburici; Natalia Gherman (acting); Valeriu Streleț; Gheorghe Brega (acting)
- Preceded by: Andrian Candu
- Succeeded by: Octavian Calmîc

Minister of Economy
- In office 18 February 2015 – 20 January 2016
- President: Nicolae Timofti
- Prime Minister: Chiril Gaburici; Natalia Gherman (acting); Valeriu Streleț; Gheorghe Brega (acting)
- Preceded by: Andrian Candu
- Succeeded by: Octavian Calmîc

Personal details
- Born: 30 September 1971 (age 54) Dakar, Senegal
- Occupation: Accountant, financier, auditor, consultant in management and fiscal policy

Stéphane Christophe Bridé (born 30 September 1971) was the Deputy Prime Minister and Minister of Economy of Moldova between 18 February 2015 and 20 January 2016. He is a French citizen who has held dual Moldovan/French nationality since 26 December 2013. He has more than 20 years experience working as an accountant, auditor and consultant in management and fiscal policy.

In 2005 he became the Moldovan motocross champion. In 2008 Bridé was part of Moldova's team at the European Motorcross Championship in Zărnești, Romania. He also holds a black belt in judo.

Bridé was one of the managing partners of Grant Thornton in Moldova.
