= Alliance for European Integration III =

- Abbreviation: AIE III
- Type: Ruling coalition
- Purpose: Governing in Moldova
- Headquarters: Chișinău
- Members: Liberal Democratic Party (PLDM); Democratic Party (PDM); Liberal Party (PL)
- Key people: Vlad Filat (PLDM); Marian Lupu (PDM); Mihai Ghimpu (PL); Valeriu Streleț (PLDM)
- Website: PLDM, PDM, PL

Alliance for European Integration III (Romanian: Alianța pentru Integrare Europeană III) was the ruling coalition in Moldova from 24 July 2015 to January, 2016.

== History ==
The previous coalition, the Political Alliance for a European Moldova, was formed at the beginning of 2015. After a banking scandal and an investigation into the qualifications of Prime Minister Chiril Gaburici, on 22 June 2015 Gaburici resigned as Prime Minister and was replaced on an interim basis by Foreign Minister Natalia Gherman, also of the PLDM.

On 24 July, the Liberal Party (PL) informed that it joined a new majority coalition which was approved by the Moldovan parliament on 31 July.

== See also ==
- Streleț Cabinet - list of coalition ministers.
