= TUTUN-CTC =

Tobacco factory in Moldova

Tutun-CTC is the largest tobacco factory in Moldova, located in the capital of Chişinău.

== History ==
The company was established in 1924, filling cigarettes on the outskirts of the city and it was the first enterprise of the tobacco industry in Bessarabia.

After the Second World War the joint enterprise developed towards the fermentation of tobacco and in 1945 produced 193 tons of fermented tobacco. By 1966 the firm had an annual output of 10 thousand tons. The industry benefited greatly from advancements in technology and efficiency in the 1970s and it became one of the most technically equipped and largest enterprises of the tobacco industry of the former USSR and all of Eastern Europe. It could now produce 4000–5000 cigarettes a minute.

== Products ==
Tutun-CTC produces about 25 brands of cigarettes and is the leader of manufacture and trade in the Republic of Moldova. The firm was awarded the International Gold Star of Quality in 1998. The tobacco products made by TUTUN-CTC vary considerably, including cigarettes with a filter and size of 84 mm, filtered cigs of 80 mm and cigarettes without a filter.
