= Natalia Gherman =

Moldovan politician and diplomat

Natalia Gherman OR
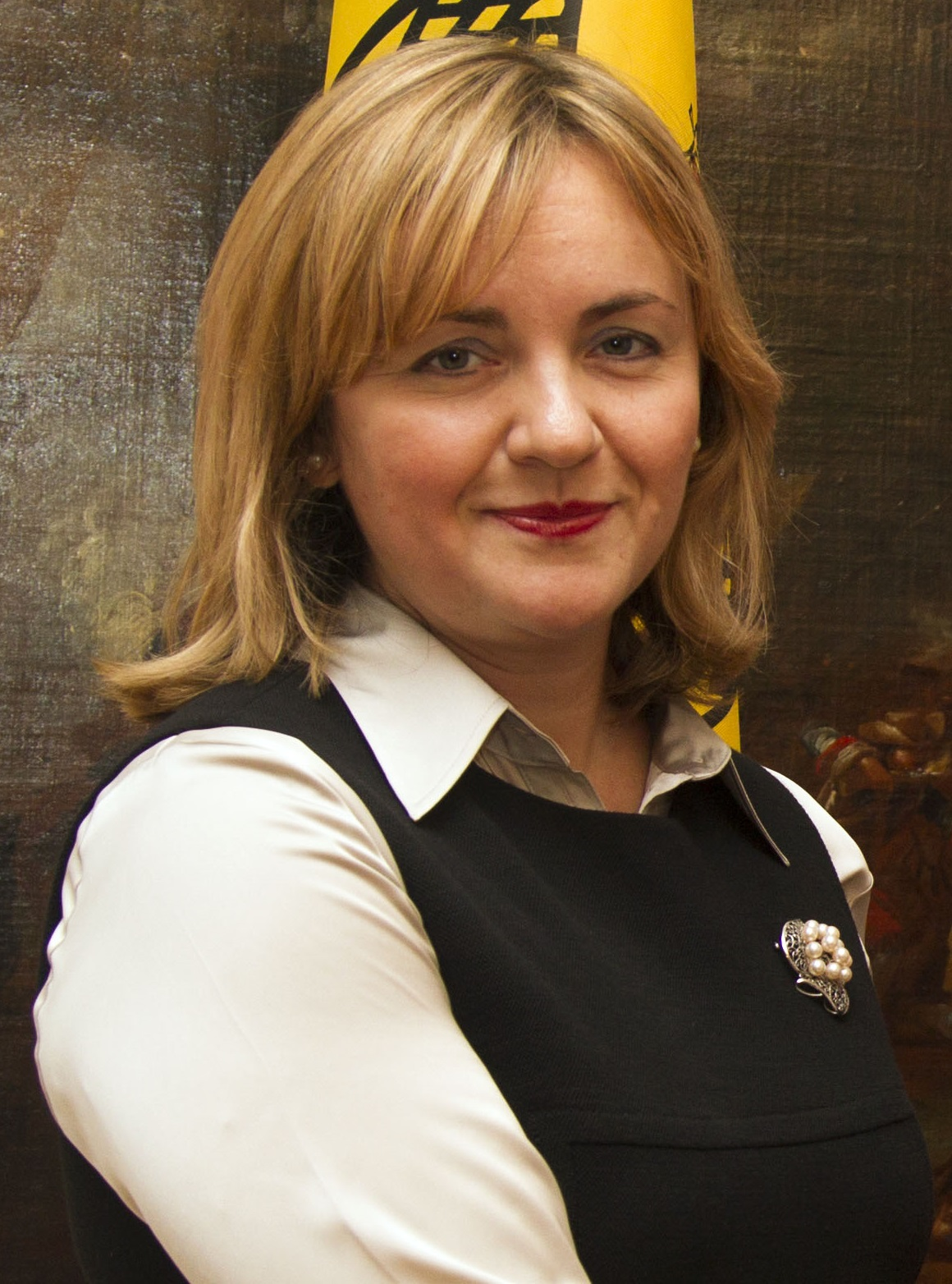
- Gherman in 2012

Special Representative of the Secretary General for Central Asia
- In office 15 September 2017 – 2 December 2022
- Secretary-General: António Guterres
- Preceded by: Petko Draganov
- Succeeded by: Kaha Imnadze

Deputy Prime Minister of Moldova
- In office 30 May 2013 – 20 January 2016 Serving with: Andrian Candu; Stéphane Christophe Bridé
- President: Nicolae Timofti
- Prime Minister: Iurie Leancă; Chiril Gaburici; Valeriu Streleț; Gheorghe Brega (acting)
- Preceded by: Iurie Leancă
- Succeeded by: Andrei Galbur

Minister of Foreign Affairs and European Integration
- In office 30 May 2013 – 20 January 2016
- President: Nicolae Timofti
- Prime Minister: Iurie Leancă; Chiril Gaburici; Valeriu Streleț; Gheorghe Brega (acting)
- Preceded by: Iurie Leancă
- Succeeded by: Andrei Galbur

Acting Prime Minister of Moldova
- In office 22 June 2015 – 30 July 2015
- President: Nicolae Timofti
- Preceded by: Chiril Gaburici
- Succeeded by: Valeriu Streleț

Member of the Moldovan Parliament
- In office 9 December 2014 – 20 February 2015
- Succeeded by: Maria Ciobanu
- Parliamentary group: Liberal Democratic Party

Deputy Minister of Foreign Affairs and European Integration
- In office 29 June 2009 – 30 May 2013
- President: Vladimir Voronin; Mihai Ghimpu (acting); Vladimir Filat (acting); Marian Lupu (acting); Nicolae Timofti
- Prime Minister: Zinaida Greceanîi; Vitalie Pîrlog (acting); Vladimir Filat
- Minister: Andrei Stratan; Iurie Leancă

Moldovan ambassador to Sweden, Finland and Norway
- In office 17 February 2006 – 30 April 2009
- President: Vladimir Voronin
- Prime Minister: Vasile Tarlev; Zinaida Greceanîi
- Preceded by: Igor Corman
- Succeeded by: Emil Druc

Personal details
- Born: Natalia Snegur; 20 March 1969 (age 57) Chișinău, Moldavian SSR, Soviet Union (now Moldova)
- Party: Liberal Democratic Party of Moldova
- Other political affiliations: Alliance for European Integration (2009–2013); Pro-European Coalition (2013–2015); Political Alliance for a European Moldova (2015); Alliance for European Integration III (2015–present)
- Spouse: Artur Gherman
- Children: Mircea Gherman
- Parent(s): Mircea Snegur; Georgeta Snegur
- Education: Moldova State University; King's College London

Natalia Gherman (née Snegur; born 20 March 1969) is a Moldovan politician who has been serving as executive director of the United Nations' Counter-Terrorism Executive Directorate since 2023.

Gherman served as minister of foreign affairs and European integration and Deputy Prime Minister of Moldova from May 2013 to January 2016. She later served as special representative of the United Nations Secretary-General for Central Asia (UNRCCA) from 2017 to 2023.

Born in Chișinău in 1969, Gherman is the daughter of Mircea Snegur, the first president of Moldova. She studied at the Moldova State University and completed postgraduate studies at King's College London. She joined the Moldovan diplomatic service, working in several different places before eventually becoming ambassador to Austria and permanent representative to the OSCE from 2002 to 2006, and ambassador to Sweden, Norway and Finland from 2006 to 2009.

In 2009, Gherman became Deputy Minister of Foreign Affairs and European Integration and Chief Negotiator on the Moldova–European Union Association Agreement, serving until 2013. In 2013 she became minister of foreign affairs and European Integration and Deputy Prime Minister of Moldova, serving until January 2016. From June to July 2015, following Chiril Gaburici's resignation, she served as the acting prime minister of Moldova.

In February 2016, Gherman was nominated as Moldova's candidate for Secretary-General of the United Nations in the 2016 selection process for Ban Ki-moon's successor.

== Early life and education ==
Gherman was born in 1969 in Chișinău, then part of the Soviet Union but now part of independent Moldova. She is the daughter of Mircea Snegur, who served as the first president of Moldova from 1991 to 1997, and Georgeta Snegur. For her undergraduate education, she received a Bachelor of Arts (BA) degree from the Moldova State University. In 1999, she completed a Master of Arts (MA) postgraduate degree in war studies at King's College London.

== Diplomatic career ==
She began working in the Moldovan diplomatic service in 1991, as the second and then first secretary at the Department of International Organizations of the Ministry of Foreign Affairs. From 1994 to 1997, she served as counsellor and deputy permanent representative to the UN Agencies in Vienna and the OSCE. From 1997 to 2001, she was deputy head of the Department of European Security and Political-Military Affairs at the Moldovan Ministry of Foreign Affairs. From 2001 to 2002, she was a minister-counsellor at the Moldovan Embassy in Brussels, as well as deputy head of the Mission of Moldova to NATO.

In 2002, she became the Moldovan ambassador to Austria and permanent representative to the OSCE and the UN Agencies in Vienna. In this role, she was a "prominent contributor to the efforts of the [OSCE] in identifying solutions to the unresolved conflicts in the OSCE area" and also mobilized "the potential of the OSCE community towards the settlement of the Transnistria conflict in the Republic of Moldova." In 2006, she left Brussels for Stockholm, becoming the Moldovan Ambassador to Sweden, Norway and Finland. For her "merits in promoting relations between Sweden and Moldova", Gherman was awarded the Order of the Polar Star at the rank of Commander 1st Class. She left this role in 2009, upon her appointment as a deputy minister.

In September 2017, she was appointed special representative and head of the UN Regional Center for Preventive Diplomacy in Central Asia with headquarters in Ashgabat, Turkmenistan.

== Political career ==
On 29 June 2009, she was appointed as Deputy Minister of Foreign Affairs and European Integration, to then-Minister Andrei Stratan. In November 2009, she was appointed as the Chief Negotiator in the talks with the European Union over the Moldova–European Union Association Agreement. She also assisted in the talks that led to the liberalization of the visa requirements for Moldovans travelling to the EU. As Deputy Prime Minister, Iurie Roșca supported Gherman.

On 30 May 2013, she was appointed as the full minister of foreign affairs and European integration, whilst concurrently being appointed to the role of Deputy Prime Minister of Moldova. She was also responsible for chairing the National Committee for Combating Trafficking in Human Beings. In this role, she participated in the Global Forum on Migration and Development and contributed to the 'High-Level Dialogue on International Migration and Development'. In 2014, The Guardian chose her as one of "Seven women to watch in global politics who are leading change all over the world." They claimed that "she could well be a future prime minister or president." Also in 2014, she was awarded Moldova's highest national honour, the Order of the Republic.

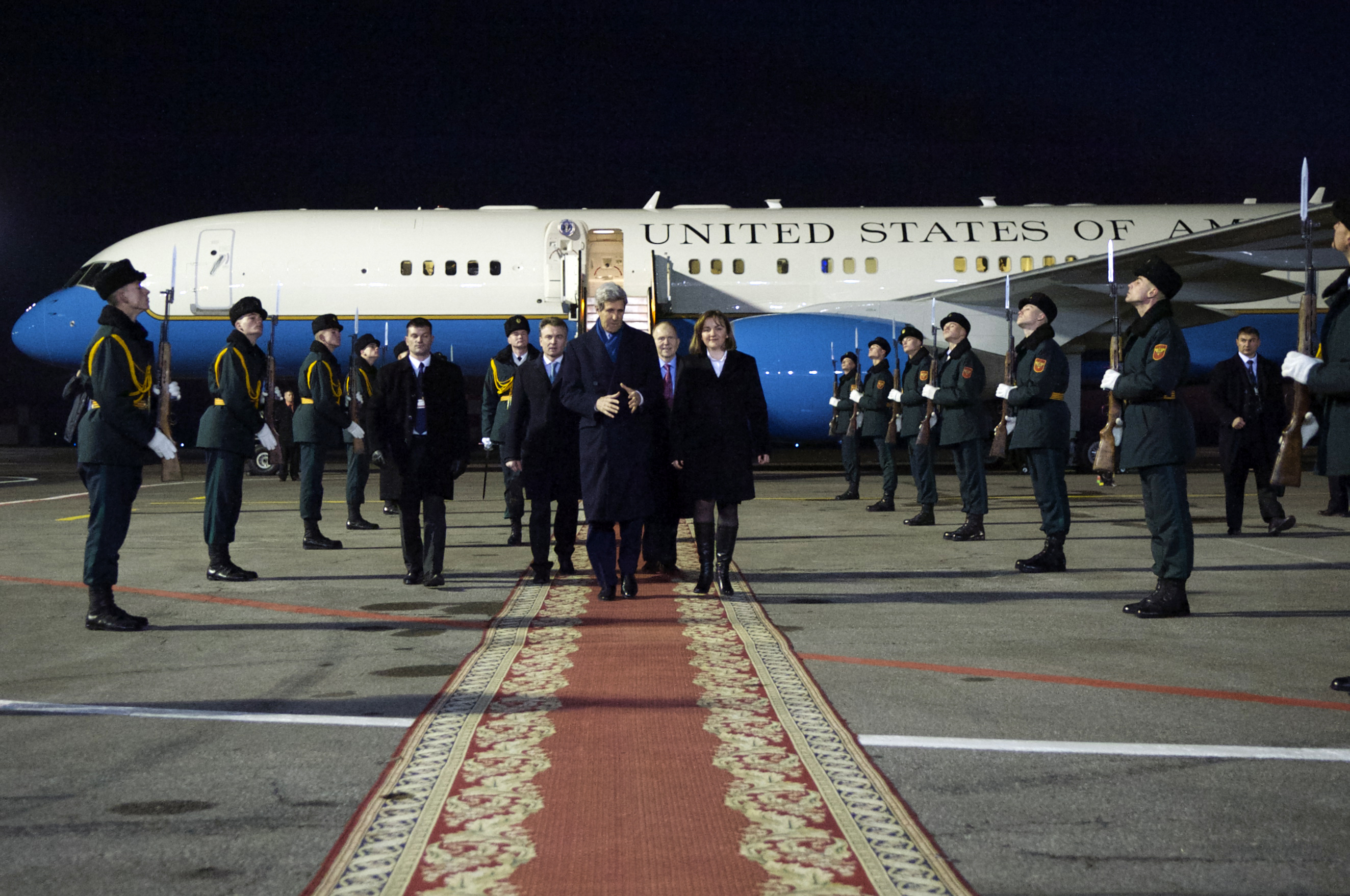
Gherman escorting John Kerry upon his arrival in Moldova in 2013.

In the November 2014 election, Gherman was elected as a member of parliament (MP), and became a member of the Parliamentary Committee on Foreign Policy and European Integration. Following Chiril Gaburici's resignation as Prime Minister of Moldova on 22 June 2015, Gherman took over in an interim capacity. She served until 30 July 2015, when Valeriu Streleț became prime minister, and she resumed her previous roles in the Streleț Cabinet. On 20 January 2016, she was succeeded in the roles of minister of foreign affairs and European integration and deputy prime minister by Andrei Galbur.

=== United Nations Secretary-General selection ===
On 18 February 2016, Gherman was officially nominated by Vlad Lupan, the Moldovan permanent representative to the UN, as the Moldovan candidate for Secretary-General of the United Nations in the 2016 selection process. On 19 February, this nomination was made public by the president of the General Assembly. It has been argued that "The long-running friction between Moldova and Russia over the breakaway region of Transnistria could mean she is blocked by Moscow."

Gherman took part in an informal dialogue at the United Nations General Assembly on 13 April 2016, where she claimed the "United Nations has never been so necessary." In total, she spoke for over two hours, in what the campaign group 1 for 7 Billion called a "historic breakthrough and the additional transparency and scrutiny that comes with it." As part of her campaign to become secretary-general, she has spoken at events or in interviews at the International Peace Institute, Royal United Services Institute, Kennan Institute, London School of Economics and King's College London. As a candidate, she is also supported by the Campaign to Elect a Woman UN Secretary-General.

On the topic of sexual exploitation and abuse by UN peacekeepers, Gherman was asked multiple times about this problem during the United Nations informal dialogues. She stated that the report given by the panel that oversees peacekeeping should be closely reviewed and analyzed. She also stated that member states need to ensure the immediate persecution of peacekeepers who commit such crimes, as their actions tarnish the UN's image. As for the victims of peacekeepers' abuse, Gherman believes we should work together to ensure that victims overcome this horrible experience and begin living a normal live. She was also questioned about peacekeeper SEA at an International Peace Institute dialogue. Gherman said that their actions were "deplorable and unacceptable" for it "undermines the trust of the people being helped in the organization and the trust of member states." She also said that member states needed to ensure that troops are well trained and held responsible in the case of abuse.

== Awards ==
- Order of the Republic (2014)
- Commander 1st Class of the Order of the Polar Star (2010, Sweden)
- Jubilee Medal "25 Years of Neutrality of Turkmenistan" (2020, Turkmenistan)

Political offices
Preceded by Iurie Leancă	First Deputy Prime Minister of Moldova; 2013–2016	Succeeded by Andrei Galbur
Preceded by Iurie Leancă	Minister of Foreign Affairs and European Integration; 2013–2016	Succeeded by Andrei Galbur
Preceded by Chiril Gaburici	Prime Minister of Moldova; Acting; 2015	Succeeded by Valeriu Streleț
