= Nicolae Timofti =

President of Moldova from 2012 to 2016

Nicolae Timofti OR
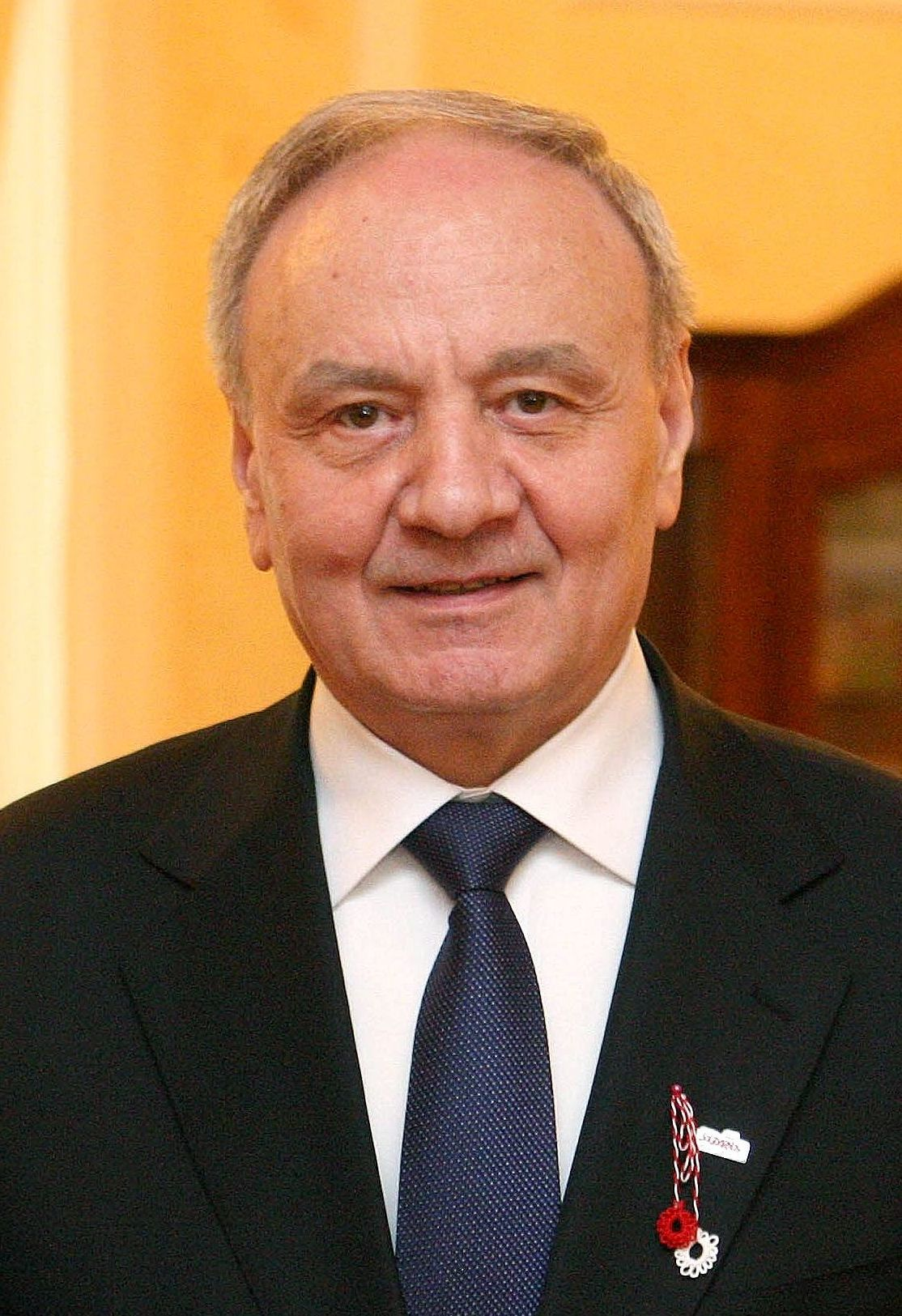
- Timofti in 2013

4th President of Moldova
- In office 23 March 2012 – 23 December 2016
- Prime Minister: Vlad Filat; Iurie Leancă; Chiril Gaburici; Natalia Gherman (acting); Valeriu Streleț; Gheorghe Brega (acting); Pavel Filip
- Preceded by: Marian Lupu (acting)
- Succeeded by: Igor Dodon

President of the Superior Council of Magistrates
- In office 4 March 2011 – 16 March 2012
- Preceded by: Dumitru Vesternicean
- Succeeded by: Nichifor Corochii

Personal details
- Born: 22 December 1948 (age 77) Ciutulești, Moldavian SSR, Soviet Union (now Moldova)
- Citizenship: Moldova; Romania
- Party: Communist Party (Before 1991); Independent (1991–present)
- Spouse: Margareta Timofti
- Children: 3
- Education: Moldova State University

Military service
- Allegiance: Soviet Union
- Branch/service: Soviet Army
- Years of service: 1972–1974
- Rank: Senior lieutenant

Nicolae Timofti (Romanian: [nikoˈla.e tiˈmofti]; born 22 December 1948) is a Moldovan jurist and politician who was President of Moldova from 23 March 2012 until 23 December 2016. He served as head of Moldova's Superior Magistrate Council and was elected President by parliament on 16 March 2012.

== Early life and education ==
Timofti was born to Elena (born 1927) and Vasile Timofti in Ciutulești, Moldavian SSR, Soviet Union and has four siblings. At the beginning of 1949, his family moved to Florești. On 6 July 1949, his paternal grandfather Tudor Timofti was deported by Soviet authorities to the Amur region, where he died in 1953. Timofti graduated from the law school of Moldova State University in 1972.

== Early activity ==
=== Soviet era ===
From 1964 to 1965 he was a worker in the regional road department of Floresti. Then, until 1967, Timofti worked as a mechanic and motorist. After graduation, Timofti spent two years in the Soviet Army before beginning his career as a judge in 1976, when he worked as a consultant at the Ministry of Justice of the Moldavian SSR. For ten years from 1980 to 1990, he was a judge of the Supreme Court of the Moldavian SSR. In April 2013, it was found out, that he was the judge who in January 1987 found the pro-Romanian dissident Gheorghe David guilty of "systematic propaganda, in writing and orally, of ideas of a nationalist character, aiming to provoke national enmity towards persons of Russian nationality, to discredit the national Leninist policy of the CPSU", In an open letter published on 16 April of that year, Timofti said "that he regrets that he was put in a situation to apply an inhumane law and explained that, as a judge, he was obliged to apply the law."

=== After independence ===
"He is a person who was with us when we started reforms in the 1990s," Mihai Ghimpu said. In 2005, Timofti was appointed to the Higher Judicial Chamber and, in 2011, he was named chairman of the Supreme Council of Magistrates.

== President of Moldova ==
- Presidency of Nicolae Timofti; 23 March 2012 – 23 December 2016
- President: Nicolae Timofti
- Prime Minister: Vlad Filat Iurie Leancă Chiril Gaburici Natalia Gherman (acting) Valeriu Streleț Gheorghe Brega (acting) Pavel Filip
- Cabinet: Second Filat Cabinet Leancă Cabinet Gaburici Cabinet Streleț Cabinet Filip Cabinet
- Party: Independent
- Election: 2012
- Seat: Presidential Palace 164 Stephen the Great Boulevard, Chișinău

After his election by parliament, Timofti identified Moldova's European orientation as a priority, as it had been the country's policy during the previous years; he stated that this policy "must continue" and that his country "has no other future than a European future". Former acting president and speaker of the Parliament of Moldova Mihai Ghimpu called Timofti "...a progressive man, [which] means a lot for the Republic of Moldova."

== Personal life ==
Timofti is married to the lawyer Margareta Timofti and they have three sons: Alexei (born 1977) works as a lawyer for the World Bank in Washington, Nicolae (Nicu) (born 1980) is a sports journalist in Chișinău, and Ștefan (born 1989) studies economics in Chișinău.

== Awards ==
- Order of Work Glory
- Honorary Title "Om emerit"
- Order of the Republic of Serbia (Serbia, 2013)
- Order of the Star of Romania (Romania, 2016)
- Order of Stara Planina (Bulgaria, 2016)
- Order of the Republic (2025)

Political offices
Preceded by Marian Lupu; Acting	President of Moldova; 2012–2016	Succeeded by Igor Dodon
