= Valeriu Streleț =

Prime Minister of Moldova in 2015

Valeriu Streleț OR
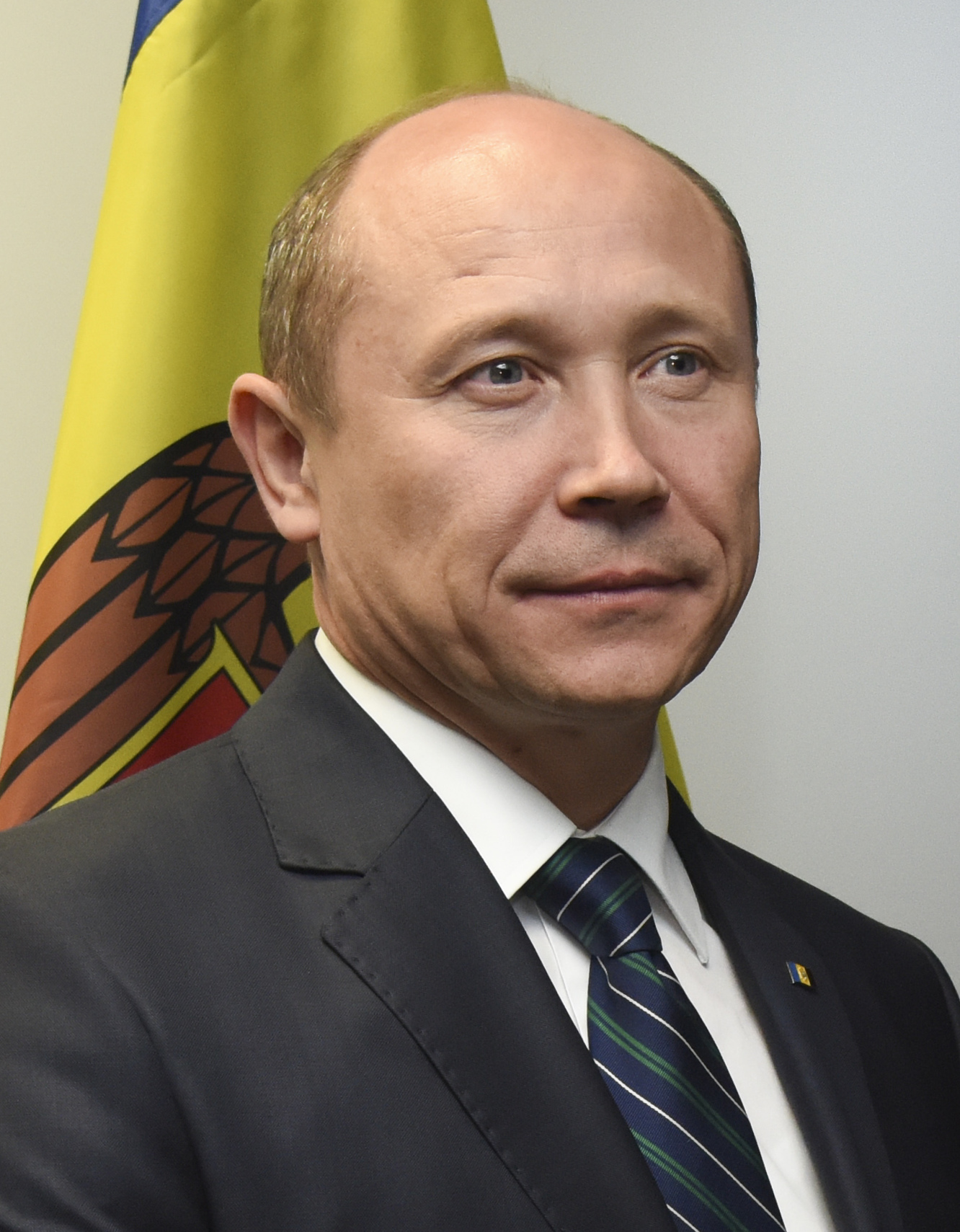
- Streleț in 2015

11th Prime Minister of Moldova
- In office 30 July 2015 – 30 October 2015
- President: Nicolae Timofti
- Deputy: Stéphane Christophe Bridé; Natalia Gherman; Victor Osipov; Gheorghe Brega
- Preceded by: Natalia Gherman (acting)
- Succeeded by: Gheorghe Brega (acting)

Member of the Moldovan Parliament
- In office 22 April 2009 – 30 July 2015
- Succeeded by: Octavian Grama
- Parliamentary group: Liberal Democratic Party

Personal details
- Born: 8 March 1970 (age 56) Țareuca, Moldavian SSR, Soviet Union (now Moldova)
- Party: Liberal Democratic Party (PLDM)
- Other political affiliations: Alliance for European; Integration (2009–2013); Pro-European Coalition (2013–2015); Political Alliance for a European; Moldova (2015); Alliance for European; Integration III (2015)
- Education: Moldova State University; Academy of Economic Studies of Moldova

Valeriu Streleț (Romanian: [streˈlets]; born 8 March 1970) is a Moldovan politician who was Prime Minister of Moldova in 2015. He subsequently received a vote of no-confidence on 29 October 2015.

== Biography ==
He has been a member of the Parliament of Moldova since 2009. He was born on 8 March 1970 in Țareuca in Soviet Moldavia. Between 1987 and 1993 he majored in history at the State University of Moldova. Between 2002 and 2005 he studied economics at the Academy of Economic Studies of Moldova (ASEM). In 2011, he was elected President of the Liberal Democratic (PLDM) faction in the Parliament.

== See also ==
- Streleț Cabinet

Political offices
Preceded by Natalia Gherman; Acting	Prime Minister of Moldova; 2015	Succeeded by Gheorghe Brega; Acting
