= Political Alliance for a European Moldova =

- Type: Ruling coalition
- Purpose: Governing in Moldova
- Headquarters: Chișinău
- Members: Liberal Democratic Party (PLDM); Democratic Party (PDM)
- Key people: Chiril Gaburici (Independent); Vlad Filat (PLDM); Marian Lupu (PDM)
- Website: PLDM, PDM

The Political Alliance for a European Moldova (Romanian: Alianța Politică pentru Moldova Europeană) was the pro-European governing coalition in Moldova from 18 February to 24 July 2015. On 24 July 2015, the Liberal Party (PL) joined a new majority coalition. It was succeeded by the Alliance for European Integration III.

== History ==
The Pro-European Coalition ended after the formation of a new government in 2015 when the Liberal Reformist Party (PLR) failed to gain representation at the preceding parliamentary election and the Liberal Party (PL) declined to participate in government. Its leaders were therefore Chiril Gaburici, Vlad Filat, and Marian Lupu.

The alliance formed a minority coalition which from its outset relied on parliamentary support from the Moldovan Communist Party (PCRM). On 22 June 2015, Gaburici resigned as Prime Minister due to an investigation into the veracity of his educational qualifications. He was replaced on an interim basis by Foreign Minister Natalia Gherman, also of the PLDM.

On 24 July 2015, it was announced that Liberal Party (PL) would join a new majority coalition.

== See also ==
- Gaburici Cabinet - list of coalition ministers.
