= Gheorghe Brega =

Moldovan politician

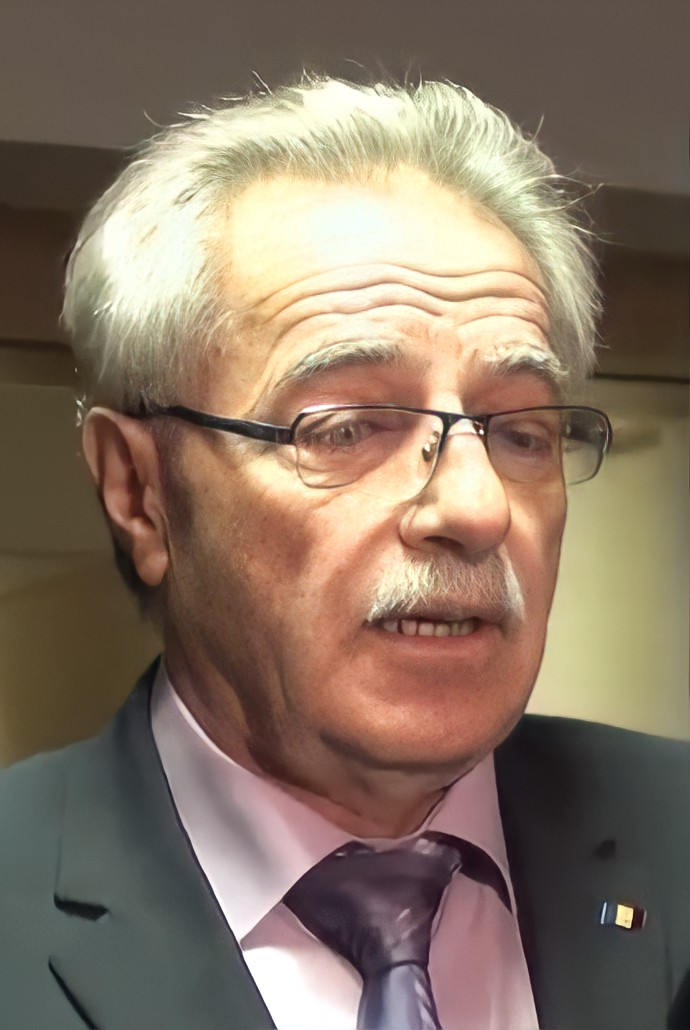
- Brega in 2016

Acting Prime Minister of Moldova
- In office 30 October 2015 – 20 January 2016
- President: Nicolae Timofti
- Preceded by: Valeriu Streleț
- Succeeded by: Pavel Filip

Deputy Prime Minister of Moldova for Social Affairs
- In office 30 July 2015 – 30 May 2017
- President: Nicolae Timofti; Igor Dodon
- Prime Minister: Valeriu Streleț; Pavel Filip
- Preceded by: Tatiana Potîng

Member of the Moldovan Parliament
- In office 22 April 2009 – 31 July 2015
- Succeeded by: Roman Boțan
- Parliamentary group: Liberal Party

Personal details
- Born: 25 September 1951 (age 75) Drepcăuți, Moldavian SSR, Soviet Union (now Moldova)
- Party: Liberal Party
- Other political affiliations: Alliance for European; Integration (2009–2013); Pro-European Coalition (2013–2015); Political Alliance for a European Moldova (2015); Alliance for European; Integration III (2015–2016)
- Education: Nicolae Testemițanu State University of Medicine and Pharmacy

Gheorghe Brega (born 25 September 1951) is a Moldovan physician and politician who was the acting Prime Minister of Moldova from 30 October 2015 to 20 January 2016. He served as Deputy Prime Minister for Social Affairs of Moldova from 30 July 2015 to 30 May 2017, and was a Member of the Moldovan Parliament from 2009 to 2015.

== Biography ==
Born in the village of Drepcăuți, Briceni District, Soviet Moldova, Brega graduated from Nicolae Testemiţanu State University of Medicine and Pharmacy in Chişinău in 1974. He was a member of the Parliament of Moldova from 2009 to 31 July 2015.

On 30 October 2015 he was named as acting prime minister (locum tenens), until Pavel Filip was chosen as a permanent replacement for Valeriu Streleț, and formed a new cabinet in which Brega continued his work as Deputy Prime Minister for Social Affairs. He was the first and last member of the Liberal Party (PL) to serve as prime minister in any capacity, even if acting.

== Honours ==
- National Order Star of Romania, rank of Grand Officer (2014)

Political offices
Preceded by Valeriu Streleț	Prime Minister of Moldova; Acting; 2015–2016	Succeeded by Pavel Filip
