= Chiril Gaburici =

Prime Minister of Moldova in 2015

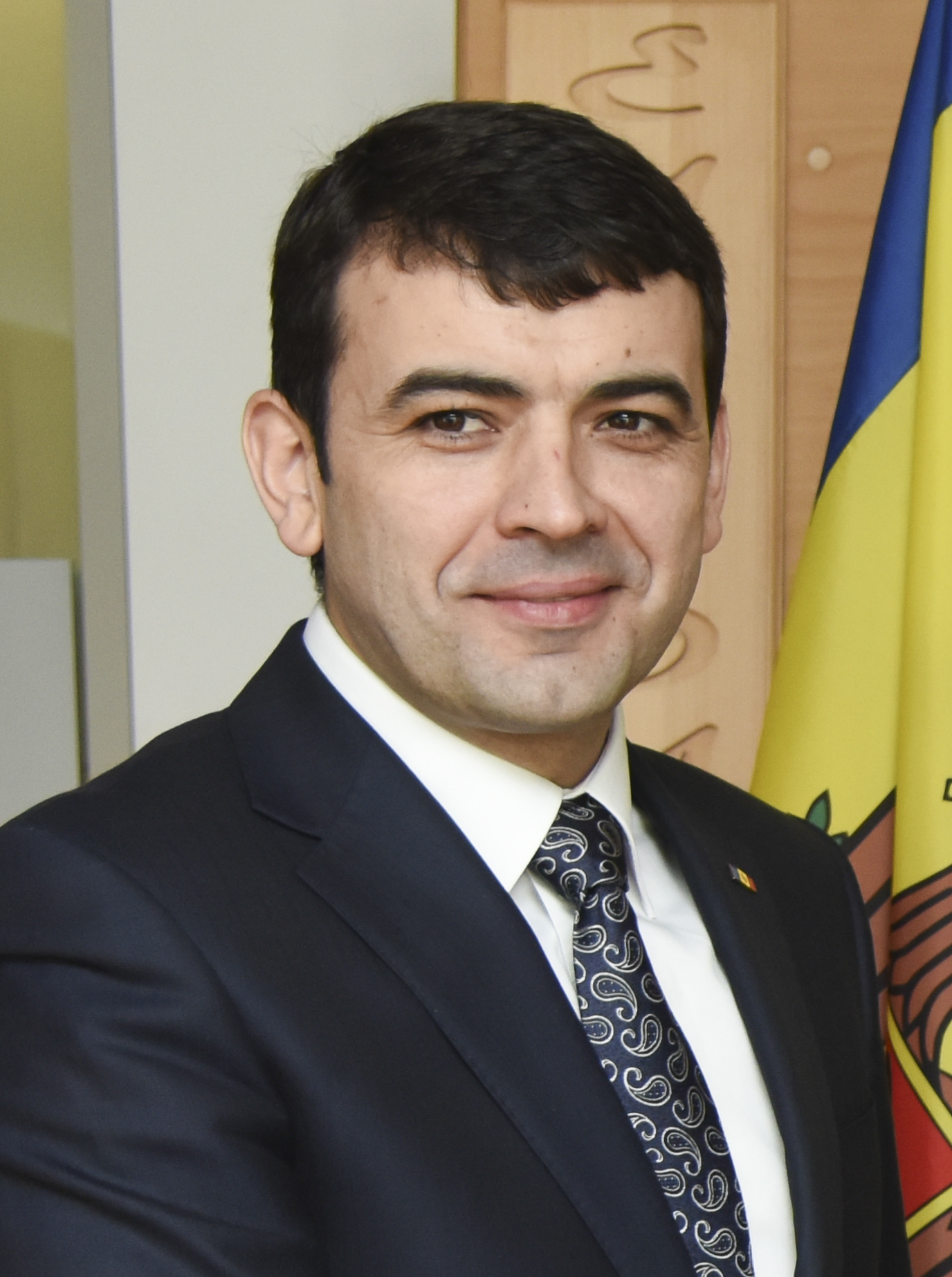
- Gaburici in 2015

10th Prime Minister of Moldova
- In office 18 February 2015 – 22 June 2015
- President: Nicolae Timofti
- Deputy: Stéphane Christophe Bridé; Natalia Gherman; Victor Osipov
- Preceded by: Iurie Leancă
- Succeeded by: Natalia Gherman (acting)

Minister of Economy and Infrastructure
- In office 10 January 2018 – 8 June 2019
- President: Igor Dodon
- Prime Minister: Pavel Filip
- Preceded by: Octavian Calmîc
- Succeeded by: Vadim Brînzan

Personal details
- Born: 23 November 1976 (age 49) Logănești, Moldavian SSR, Soviet Union (now Moldova)
- Party: Independent
- Children: 2
- Education: Slavonic University of Moldova

Chiril Gaburici (Romanian: [kiˈril ɡaˈburit͡ʃʲ]; born 23 November 1976) is a Moldovan businessman and former prime minister of Moldova.

== Biography ==
Chiril Gaburici was born on November 23, 1976, in the village of Loganesti, Hincesti district, Moldavian SSR, the Soviet Union.

== Early career ==
He was the first Moldovan manager of the company Moldcell. In 2012, he went to Azercell, Azerbaijan. The president invited him to form a government on 14 February 2015. He had 15 days to obtain parliamentary approval of his cabinet. On 18 February 2015, Parliament approved his cabinet. He was sworn in the same day. He resigned on 12 June 2015 after the Prosecutor General's Office began a criminal investigation into the falsification of his school diplomas. On 22 June he was succeeded by Natalia Gherman.

== Personal life ==
Gaburici is married to Irina and together they have three children.

He speaks Romanian, Russian, English, and French.

He is passionate about guitar and car sports. He participated in professional racing and rallies. He is the president of the national autosport club.

== Controversies ==
At the end of February 2015, after receiving an anonymous message with some clues, and motivated by the fact that in the official CV of Gaburici there are no academic years but only the name of the institutions, journalists from Ziarul de Gardă did an investigation into his studies.

They learned that, after graduating from gymnasium, Gaburici studied at the Republican College of Microelectronics and Computer Engineering (CRMTC) in Chisinau, although he had not indicated this in his official CV. According to the vice director of the CRMTC, Gaburici studied there 1992-1995 and was expelled, and he had not attended the baccalaureate session and was not awarded the BAC diploma.

According to the same investigation, in 2009-2011, already being director at Moldcell, at the age of 33, Gaburici had obtained his master's degree at the Free International University of Moldova (ULIM). He subsequently completed doctoral studies at the University of the Academy of Sciences of Moldova (UASM), based on a contract. He was enrolled at UASM in 2011 at non-frequency studies, followed by a four-year study, and 2015 was his final year of studies.

In an official response of the Government of the Republic of Moldova to the request for clarification of the situation, it was said (in addition to the data above) that Gaburici was admitted to ASEM in 1995, and in 1998 he transferred to the Slavonic University.

Additionally, Gaburici completed specialised courses in sales and marketing at the London School of Economics.

== See also ==
- Political Alliance for a European Moldova – governing coalition

Political offices
Preceded by Iurie Leancă	Prime Minister of Moldova; 2015	Succeeded by Natalia Gherman; Acting
