= 1999 in Moldova =

- Decades: 1970s; 1980s; 1990s; 2000s; 2010s
- See also: Other events of 1999; Timeline of Moldovan history

Events in the year 1999 in Moldova.

== Incumbents ==
- President – Petru Lucinschi
- Prime Minister – Ion Ciubuc, Ion Sturza, Dumitru Braghiș
- President of the Parliament – Dumitru Diacov

== Events ==
=== May ===
- May 11 - The 22nd Peacekeeping Battalion is founded.
- May 23 - A nationwide constitutional referendum; Local elections take place.

=== June ===
- June 7 - The Bogdan Petriceicu Hasdeu State University is founded in Cahul.

=== August ===
- August 15 - The Republican Party of Moldova is founded.

=== September ===
- September 1 - Prime is established.
- September 3 - ProTV Chișinău is established.
- September 25 - The Labour Party is founded.

=== October ===
- October 22 - Taraclia County is established.
