= 2024 in Moldova =

- Decades: 2000s; 2010s; 2020s
- See also: Other events of 2024; Timeline of Moldovan history

Events from the year 2024 in Moldova.

== Incumbents ==
Photo	Post	Name
	President of Moldova	Maia Sandu
	Prime Minister of Moldova	Dorin Recean
	President of the Parliament	Igor Grosu

== Events ==
=== February ===
- 28 February – Officials in the Russian-backed breakaway region of Transnistria, internationally recognised as a part of Moldova, appeal to the Russian Duma for more intervention in Transnistria amid increasing tension with the government of Moldova.

=== April ===
- 24 April – Moldova files a criminal case against Evghenia Guțul, the leader of Gagauzia, over funds received from Russia.

=== June ===
- 5 June – Igor Gorgan, the former Chief of the General Staff of Moldova, is stripped of his rank and medals after media reports reveal that he had been spying for Russia.
- 7 June – The European Commission allows Moldova to begin negotiations on joining the European Union.
- 10 June – President Maia Sandu signs amendments to the country's criminal code expanding provisions against treason into law.
- 12 June – The United States imposes sanctions on Evghenia Guțul, the pro-Russian governor of Gagauzia.
- 25 June – The European Union formally launches accession negotiations with Ukraine and Moldova.

=== July ===
- 31 July – The Parliament of Moldova is searched by the Security and Intelligence Service of Moldova following reports of spying involving the head of the legislature's legal department, Ion Creanga.

=== August ===
- 1 August – Authorities announce the arrest of two government employees on suspicion of spying for an undisclosed country.

=== September ===
- 12 September – A Moldovan soldier is fatally shot in unclear circumstances along the demarcation line with Transnistria.

=== October ===
- 3 October – Authorities announce the discovery of a plot by businessman Ilan Shor involving $15 million in funds from Russia that were distributed to around 130,000 people in order to bribe voters into selecting anti-Western decisions during the 2024 Moldovan presidential election and 2024 Moldovan European Union membership constitutional referendum and spread disinformation against the European Union on social media, following raids on 26 locations nationwide.
- 20 October:
  - 2024 Moldovan presidential election (first round): Both incumbent president Maia Sandu and former prosecutor-general Alexandr Stoianoglo advance to the runoff.
  - 2024 Moldovan European Union membership constitutional referendum: A narrow majority of voters approve proposals to amend the constitution in order to enshrine Moldova's commitment to join the European Union.
- 27 October – A Socata TB20 ultra-light aircraft registered in Germany crashes in Vadul lui Vodă, killing its pilot.

=== November ===
- 3 November – 2024 Moldovan presidential election (second round): Maia Sandu wins reelection with 54.97% of the vote.

=== December ===
- 13 December – Parliament approves a 60-day state of emergency beginning on 16 December amid concerns over possible power outages caused by the end of Russian gas supplies to the Cuciurgan power station in Transnistria.

== Art and entertainment ==
- List of Moldovan submissions for the Academy Award for Best International Feature Film
- Moldova in the Eurovision Song Contest 2024

== Deaths ==
- 12 February – Mihai Amihalachioaie, 62, accordionist and conductor
- 14 February – John Onoje, 64, Sierra Leonean-born Moldovan political activist
- 11 June – Arcadie Spoială, 36, film director
- 12 June – Ion Krasnopolsky, 79, musician
- 21 June – Spiridon Vangheli, 92, children's author, poet and translator
- 6 July – Teodor Zgureanu, 85, conductor and composer

== Holidays ==
- 1–2 January – New Year's Day
- 7–8 January – Orthodox Christmas Day
- 8 March – International Women's Day
- 1 May – Labour Day
- 5 May – Orthodox Easter Sunday
- 6 May – Orthodox Easter
- 9 May – Victory Day
- 1 June – Children's Day
- 27 August – Independence Day
- 31 August – Romanian Language Day
- 25 December - Catholic Christmas

== See also ==
- 2024 in the European Union
- 2024 in Europe
