= 2020 in Moldova =

- Decades: 2000s; 2010s; 2020s
- See also: Other events of 2020; Timeline of Moldovan history

== Incumbents ==
- President – Igor Dodon (until 24 December), Maia Sandu (from 24 December)
- Prime Minister – Ion Chicu (until 31 December), Aureliu Ciocoi (from 31 December, acting)
- President of the Parliament – Zinaida Greceanîi

== Events ==
- 1 November – 2020 Moldovan presidential election.
- 15 November – Maia Sandu is elected as the president of the country
- 24 December – The inauguration of Maia Sandu as President of Moldova took place, she became the first female president of the country

== Deaths ==
- 13 January – Ștefan Petrache, singer (b. 1949)
- 22 March – Petru Bogatu, journalist and writer (b. 1951)
- 8 April – Valeriu Muravschi, politician and businessman (b. 1949)
- 25 May – Nadejda Brânzan, politician (b. 1948)
- 3 June – Valentina Tăzlăuanu, writer and journalist (b. 1950)
- 13 October – Veaceslav Semionov, footballer and manager (b. 1956)
- 22 November – Elena Hrenova, politician (b. 1950)
