= 2025 in Moldova =

- Decades: 2000s; 2010s; 2020s
- See also: Other events of 2025; Timeline of Moldovan history

Events from the year 2025 in Moldova.

== Incumbents ==
Photo	Post	Name
	President of Moldova	Maia Sandu
	Prime Minister of Moldova	Dorin Recean (until 1 November)
	Prime Minister of Moldova	Alexandru Munteanu (from 1 November)
	President of the Parliament	Igor Grosu

== Events ==
=== January ===
- 1 January – Russian gas stops flowing to Slovakia and Moldova through the territory of Ukraine.

=== March ===
- 25 March – Evghenia Guțul, the leader of Gagauzia, is arrested at Chișinău International Airport.
- 31 March – Three Russian diplomats are expelled from Moldova on suspicion of involvement in the escape of MP Alexandr Nesterovschi, who was sentenced in absentia to 12 years' imprisonment for illegal political funding.

=== July ===
- 22 July – Oligarch and former deputy parliament speaker Vladimir Plahotniuc, who fled Moldova in 2019 and is wanted for money laundering and involvement in the theft of $1 billion from the state budget and banking system, is arrested in Greece. He is extradited to Moldova on 25 September.

=== August ===
- 5 August – Evghenia Guțul, the leader of Gagauzia, is sentenced by a court in Chișinău to seven years' imprisonment for channeling undeclared Russian funds to the subsequently banned Șor Party from 2019 to 2022.

=== September ===
- 8 September – The Czech Security Information Service announces that it had identified a former deputy of the Security and Intelligence Service of Moldova as a member of a trans-European espionage network run by the Belarusian KGB.
- 22 September – Police carry out raids on more than 250 locations nationwide as part of a criminal investigation on a destabilization plot blamed on Russia.
- 28 September – 2025 Moldovan parliamentary election: The ruling pro-European Party of Action and Solidarity (PAS) wins a majority of seats in Parliament.
- 28 September–5 October – 2025 UEFA Under-19 Futsal Championship

== Holidays ==
- 1–2 January – New Year's Day
- 7–8 January – Orthodox Christmas Day
- 8 March – International Women's Day
- 20 April – Orthodox Easter Sunday
- 21 April – Orthodox Easter
- 28 April – Easter of Blajini
- 1 May – Labour Day
- 9 May – Victory Day
- 1 June – Children's Day
- 27 August – Independence Day
- 31 August – Romanian Language Day
- 25 December - Catholic Christmas

== Deaths ==
- 3 January – Grigore Eremei, 89, politician and diplomat.
- 25 February – Vladimir Beșleagă, 93, writer and politician, MP (1990–1994).
- 13 May – Gheorghe Paladi, doctor, specialist in obstetrics and gynecology, full member of the Academy of Sciences of Moldova.
- 24 August – Margareta Ivănuș, 75, singer.
- 13 November – Efim Zubcu, 82, politician, deputy (2001–2005).

== See also ==
- 2025 in the European Union
- 2025 in Europe
