= 2011 in Moldova =

- Decades: 1990s; 2000s; 2010s; 2020s
- See also: Other events of 2011; Timeline of Moldovan history

Events in the year 2011 in Moldova.

== Incumbents ==
- President: Marian Lupu (Acting President)
- Prime Minister: Vlad Filat

== Events ==
- 17 April – Action 2012, a coalition of organizations supporting unification between Moldova and Romania, is founded.
- Moldovan local election, 2011
- Moldovan presidential election, 2011
- Chișinău Independence Day Parade, 2011

== Arts and entertainment ==
Music: Moldova in the Eurovision Song Contest 2011.

== Sports ==
Soccer competitions: Moldovan National Division, Moldovan "A" Division, Moldovan Cup.
