= 2022 in Moldova =

- Decades: 2000s; 2010s; 2020s
- See also: Other events of 2022; Timeline of Moldovan history

Events from the year 2022 in Moldova.

== Incumbents ==
Photo	Post	Name
	President of Moldova	Maia Sandu
	Prime Minister of Moldova	Natalia Gavrilița
	President of the Parliament	Igor Grosu

== Events ==
- 24 February – Moldova declares a state of emergency in response to the 2022 Russian invasion of Ukraine. Hundreds of Ukrainians are crossing the border, according to President Maia Sandu. The country also closes its airspace to commercial aircraft.
- 25 February – following the start of the Russian invasion of Ukraine, the Moldovan chemical tanker MV Millennial Spirit is shelled by the Russian military while navigating through the Black Sea.
- 3 March – Moldova officially applies to joining the European Union (EU). This is not well-received in Transnistria, a breakaway unrecognized state internationally recognized as part of Moldova, which demands its recognition as an independent state.
- 26 April – 2022 Transnistria attacks: Moldova's Supreme Security Council convenes an emergency meeting after yesterday's attacks in the breakaway Transnistria. President Maia Sandu says that the attacks were aimed at "destabilizing the situation in the region", and also says that the military will improve combat readiness and increase patrols on the border with Transnistria.
- 1 May – Ukrainian intelligence officials report that Russia is poised to launch a second front from the breakaway area of Transnistria in order to take over the rest of Moldova.
- 24 May – Former President of Moldova Igor Dodon is arrested on charges including corruption and treason.
- 23 June – The European Union formally awards official candidate status to Ukraine and Moldova.
- 15 July – TUMnanoSAT, the first Moldovan satellite, built by the Technical University of Moldova, is launched into space.
- 9 August – Russia bans the import of agricultural products from Moldova from August 15 due to "repeated detection of dangerous quarantine objects in Moldovan products entering Russia".
- 10 October – Moldova confirms that Russian Navy warships in the Black Sea fired cruise missiles through its airspace to strike targets inside Ukraine. The Russian ambassador is subsequently summoned by Moldovan authorities to explain the violation.
- 12 October – Moldova urges its citizens to decrease the use of electricity after Ukraine halted exports due to Russian missile attacks hit critical infrastructure of the country.
- 31 October – Russia launches another wave of missile attacks over Ukraine, and a missile falls within Moldovan territory, in the village of Naslavcea.
- 5 December – Due to another wave of Russian missile strikes against Ukraine, a missile again falls within Moldova, close to the city of Briceni.

== Deaths ==
- 2 January – Ion Niculiță, 82, archaeologist
- 16 January – Andrei Mudrea, 67, artist
- 25 January – Svetlana Căpățînă, 52, politician
- 4 July – Elena Bodnarenco, 57, politician
- 22 July – Aleksey Vdovin, 59, Olympic water polo player
- 12 August – Ion Solonenco, 87, army general
- 30 August –Ludmila Diacenco-Sulac, 73, musician
- 3 September – Yuri Bashkatov, 54, Olympic swimmer
- 9 September – Nicolae Bulat, 70, historian

== See also ==
- 2022 Moldovan energy crisis
- 2022–2023 Moldovan protests
