= 2018 in Moldova =

- Decades: 1990s; 2000s; 2010s; 2020s
- See also: Other events of 2018; Timeline of Moldovan history

== Incumbents ==
- President – Igor Dodon
- Prime Minister – Pavel Filip
- President of the Parliament – Andrian Candu

== Predicted and Scheduled Events ==
=== January ===
- 2 January - President Igor Dodon is temporarily suspended from performing his duties as President of Moldova by the Constitutional Court of Moldova following Dodon's refusal to swear in 7 government officials.

=== February ===
- 9–25 February - Moldova competed in the 2018 Winter Olympic games in PyeongChang, South Korea, with 2 competitors in 2 sports, Cross-country skiing and Alpine skiing.

=== March ===
- 27 March - A rally on Great National Assembly Square in Chișinău was organized in honour of the 100th anniversary of Moldova joining the Kingdom of Romania. The rally called for the reunification of Moldova and Romania.

=== April ===
- 18–19 April - The President of Belarus Alexander Lukashenko became the first foreign leader to be received in Moldova by President Igor Dodon on a state visit.

=== July ===
- 1 July - Celebrating the centenary of the Great Union (the unification of Romania with Bessarabia, Bukovina and Transylvania), a demonstration called the Centenary March is organized by several Romanian and Moldovan activists for unification. It starts in Alba Iulia in Romania on this day, and the participants plan to end the march on 1 September in Chișinău.

=== August ===
- 29 August - Participants of the Centenary March cross the border and enter Moldova.

=== September ===
- 1 September - The Centenary March ends in the Great National Assembly Square in Chișinău.
- September - The World Congress of Families holds it World Conferences in Chisinau, Moldova with President Igor Dodon host.

== Deaths ==
- Ion Ciubuc, 74, Moldovan politician, Prime Minister (1997–1999).
- Dumitru Moțpan, 78, Moldovan politician, President of Parliament (1997–1998).
- Stepan Topal, 80, Moldovan politician, Governor of Gagauzia (1990–1995), MP (1990–1994).

== See also ==
- 2018 unification declarations in Moldova and Romania
