= 2012 in Moldova =

- Decades: 1990s; 2000s; 2010s; 2020s
- See also: Other events of 2012; Timeline of Moldovan history

Events from the year 2012 in Moldova

== Incumbents ==
- President: Marian Lupu (Acting President) (until March 23), Nicolae Timofti (starting March 23)
- Prime Minister: Vlad Filat

== Events ==
- January 1 - Moldova security zone incident
- January 15 - second attempt at Moldovan presidential election
- December 23 - Pădurea Domnească case

== Deaths ==
=== January ===
- January 2 - Ivan Călin, 76, politician, Acting President of the Moldovan Parliament (2009)
