= 2016 in Moldova =

- Decades: 1990s; 2000s; 2010s; 2020s
- See also: Other events of 2016; Timeline of Moldovan history

The following lists events that happened during 2016 in the Republic of Moldova.

== Incumbents ==
- President – Nicolae Timofti (until December 23), Igor Dodon (starting December 23)
- Prime Minister – Gheorghe Brega (until January 20), Pavel Filip (starting January 20)
- President of the Parliament – Andrian Candu

== Events ==
=== January ===
- January 14 - Thousands of Moldovans march the streets in protest against proposed candidate for Prime Minister Vlad Plahotniuc.

=== August ===
- August 5-21 - 12 athletes from Moldova competed in the 2016 Summer Olympics in Rio de Janeiro, Brazil
- August 27 - Moldova celebrated its 25th anniversary since its independence from the USSR in 1991.

=== October ===
- October 30 - Igor Dodon wins the presidential election in Moldova.

=== December ===
- December 23 - Igor Dodon is sworn in as the President of Moldova in the Palace of the Republic in Chișinău.
