= 2014 in Moldova =

- Decades: 1990s; 2000s; 2010s; 2020s
- See also: Other events of 2014; Timeline of Moldovan history

Events in the year 2014 in Moldova.

== Incumbents ==
- President – Nicolae Timofti, since 2012
- Prime Minister – Iurie Leancă, since 2013
- President of the Parliament – Igor Corman, since 2013

== Events ==
=== January–June ===
- 2 February – A referendum on Gagauzia's independence from Moldova is held with 98.9 percent of voters supporting Gagauzia's self-determination. Despite the overwhelming support, Chișinău authorities declare the referendum illegal.
- 10 February – The Minister of Foreign Affairs Natalia Gherman holds a meeting with NATO Secretary General Anders Fogh Rasmussen to discuss "practical cooperation" between the nation and the western political union.
- 27 February – The European Parliament votes to approve abolishing visa requirements for Moldovan citizens who have biometric passports.
- 25 March – The governor of Gagauzia Mihail Formuzal and the president of the People's Assembly of Gagauzia, Dmitri Constantinov visit Russia with the purpose to meet with Russian president Vladimir Putin and Russian prime minister Dmitry Medvedev to sign a twinning agreement and trade agreement.
- 6 May – Moldova in the Eurovision Song Contest 2014: The song "Wild Soul" by Cristina Scarlat is sung representing Moldova in the semi-finals of the 2014 Eurovision Song Contest, but fails to score enough points to move on to the finals.
- 12-25 May – The 2014 Moldovan census takes place, marking the second census in the nations history.
- 7 June – US$8 million is pledged by United States vice president Joe Biden after meeting with President Timofti during a visit to the capital of Ukraine, Kyiv, for the inauguration of the new Ukrainian president Petro Poroshenko. The aid comes in addition to the US$2.7 million pledged by the US in March to help promote programs to democratic institutions and the economy.
- 26 June – The village of Doroțcaia holds an open rally with the goal to join the self-proclaimed nation of Transnistria in protest of a legal dispute which lead to 85% of the farmland in the village becoming of limits to its residents, and on the eve of the ratification of an agreement which would tie Moldova closer to the EU.
- 27 June
  - Moldova signs a major free trade and political association agreement with the European Union (EU) to strengthen the nation's relationship with the western political union, much to the disliking of members of the Socialist and Communist Parties in the nation. Upon the signing of the agreement, all 38 of the pro-Russia Communist Party MPs staged a walkout.
  - Russia imposes a ban on imports of beef, horse meat, lamb, and pork which are major imports of Moldova to Russia in response to the ratification of the major free trade and political association agreement with the EU taking place the same day, but officially because of supposed African swine fever in the meat products.

=== July–December ===
- 5 July – The Council for TV and Radio suspends the broadcast license of the Russian TV channel Russia-24 and places sanctions on four Moldovan broadcasters for lack of pluralism.
- 21 July – Russia further imposes a temporary ban on fruit imports including, but not limited to; apples, plums, peaches, and canned fruit, and restricts most imports of plant-products from the nation still in response to the ratification of the major free trade and political association agreement signed with the EU on 27 June.
- 5 August – The Ministry of Foreign Affairs unsuccessfully calls on Russia to remove the 1,500 troops and weapons they have stationed in the Transnistria region.
- 7 August – A 3 kilometres (1.9 mi) long convoy of farmers drives to the capital Chișinău in their farming vehicles to protest and make aware the financial plight brought on them by Moldova's EU agreement from 27 June and Russia's following fruit imports on the nation.
- 27-31 August: A farmers' market takes place at the National Square in Chișinău as a way to promote struggling agricultural workers during Russia's fruit bans on the nation, in what is described as a "largely symbolic" "publicity stunt" by Prime Minister Leancă by some media outlets.
- 24-26 November
  - 2014 Moldovan bank fraud scandal:
    - Three large Moldovan banks; Banca de Economii, Unibank, and Banca Socială, have more than US$1 billion extracted from them in the span of just three days.
    - On 26 November, the three banks involved in the scandal file for bankruptcy, and are shortly after placed under special administration of the National Bank of Moldova.
  - The Pro-Russia Homeland Party is banned from participating in the upcoming parliamentary elections by the Central Election Commission because of reported financial support from abroad. The decision is upheld by the Chisinau Appeals Court the following day.
- 27 November – 2014 Moldovan bank fraud scandal:
  - A van belonging to the chairman of the board of the Savings Bank of Moldova Ilan Shor transporting 12 sacks of bank files is stolen and burned.
  - In a deal secretly made by Prime Minister Leanca, the three banks are bailed out with US$870 million in emergency loans covered from state reserves, which is equivalent to an eighth of the nations GDP.
- 30 November – The 2014 Moldovan parliamentary elections take place in the nation, with the Party of Socialists winning the most seats at 25 with 20.51 percent of the vote, with the Liberal Democratic Party coming in a close second with 23 seats and 20.16 percent of the vote. The final results of the election on an international stage show that pro-Western parties have about a small 5 percent lead over the anti-Western parties in the nation.
- 9 December – After a successful police raid in the week prior, seven suspects who were arrested admit to having smuggled seven ounces of uranium valued at US$2.1 million and just over two pounds of mercury into the nation from Russia through the black market in the Transnistria region. Nationwide concern over the confession comes as the materials smuggled could be used to make dirty bombs, and if enriched, nuclear bombs.

== Sports ==
=== Winter Olympics ===
- Two Alpine skiers representing the nation made it to qualifying positions on 20 January, but did not qualify in the end after naturalized skier Mirko Deflorian withdrew from the team citing poor results.
- Two Cross-country skiers representing the nation made it to qualifying positions on 20 January. The team was officially named on 22 January, but did not medal.
- Moldova qualified in the men's singles in luge when athlete Bogdan Macovei finished in the top 38 during the 2013–14 Luge World Cup. The team was officially named on 22 January.

=== Other Events ===
- 2014–15 Moldovan Cup
- 2014 Moldovan Super Cup
- 2014–15 Moldovan National Division
- 2014–15 Moldovan Women's Cup

== See also ==
- 2014 in Europe
- 2014 in Transnistria
- 2014–15 in Moldovan football
- List of Moldovan films of 2014
