= 2019 in Moldova =

- Decades: 1990s; 2000s; 2010s; 2020s
- See also: Other events of 2019; Timeline of Moldovan history

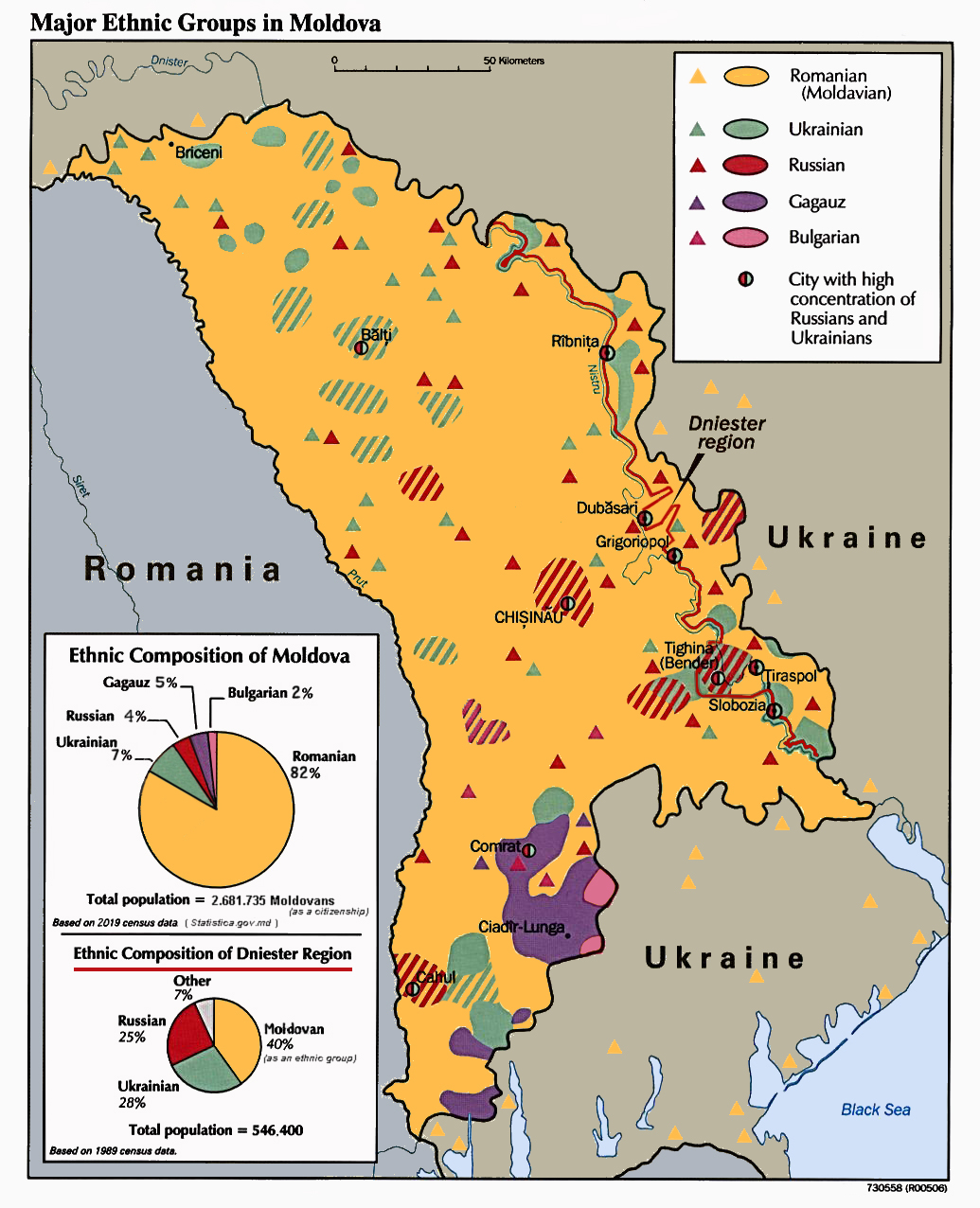
Major ethnic groups of Moldova in 2019

Events of 2019 in Moldova.

== Incumbents ==
- President – Igor Dodon
- Prime Minister – Pavel Filip (until 8 June), Maia Sandu (8 June - 14 November), Ion Chicu (from 14 November)
- President of the Parliament – Andrian Candu (until 24 February), Zinaida Greceanîi (starting 8 June)

== Events ==
- 2 February – The 660th anniversary of the founding of the Moldovan state will be celebrated.
- 24 February – The 2019 Moldovan parliamentary election and the 2019 Moldovan referendum.
- 7–15 June – 2019 Moldovan constitutional crisis
- 23 August – The 75th anniversary of the Second Jassy–Kishinev Offensive is celebrated.
- 20 October – 2019 Moldovan local elections

== Deaths ==
- 20 February - Boris Vieru, 61, Moldovan politician and journalist, MP (2009–2014).
