= 2021 in Moldova =

- Decades: 2000s; 2010s; 2020s
- See also: Other events of 2021; Timeline of Moldovan history

Events from the year 2021 in Moldova.

== Incumbents ==
Photo	Post	Name
	President of Moldova	Maia Sandu
	Prime Minister of Moldova (until 6 August 2021)	Aureliu Ciocoi (acting)
	Prime Minister of Moldova (since 6 August 2021)	Natalia Gavrilița
	President of the Parliament (until 26 July 2021)	Zinaida Greceanîi
	President of the Parliament (since 29 July 2021)	Igor Grosu

== Events ==
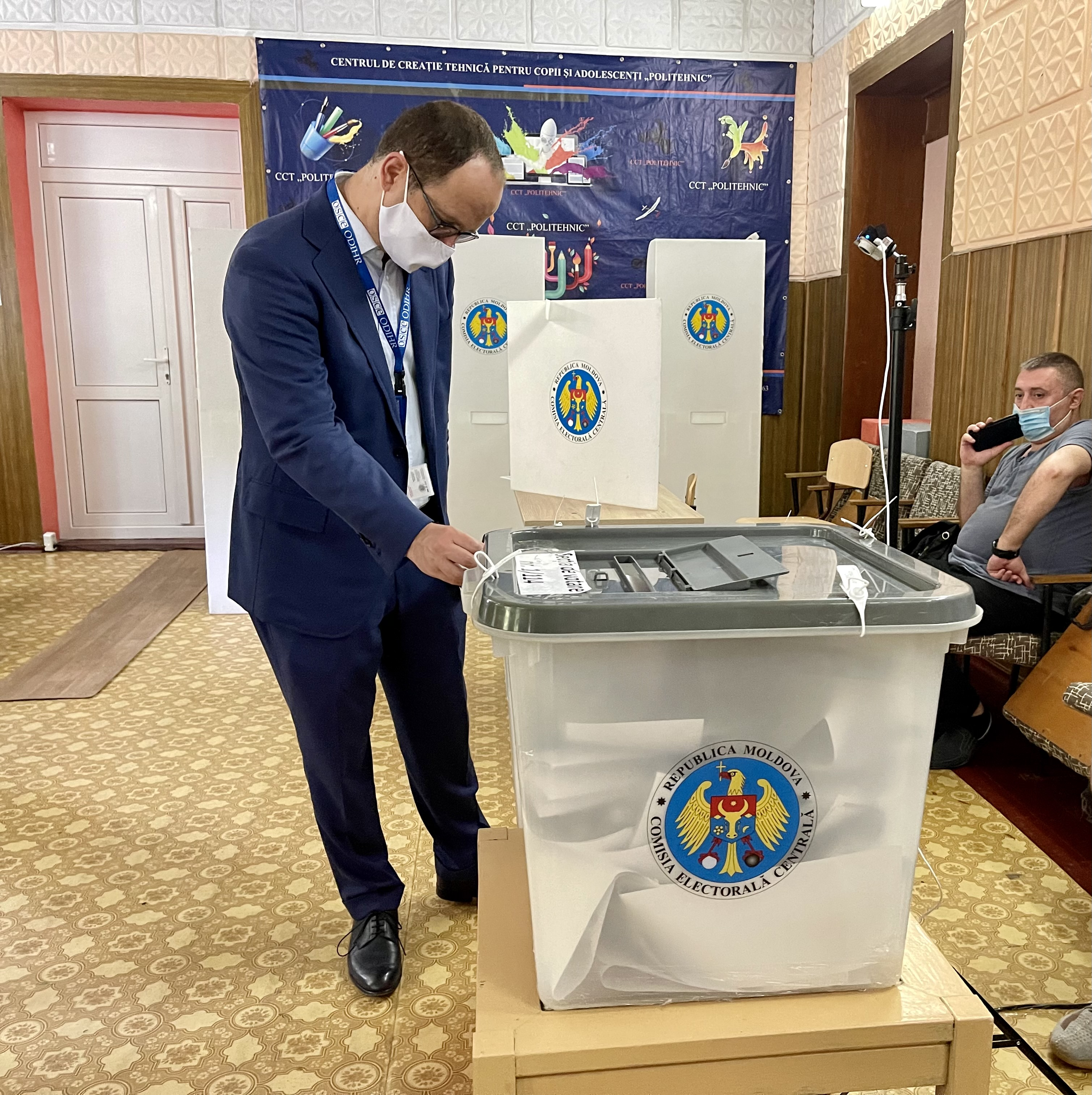
OSCE Special Co-ordinator Ditmir Bushati observing parliamentary election procedures in Chișinău

- 13 January – The National Extraordinary Public Health Commission (Romanian: Comisia Națională Extraordinară de Sănătate Publică, CNESP) approves the national immunisation plan against COVID-19. The plan lays out three vaccination stages: the first one – aimed at public health workers, the second one – aimed at those aged above 60, vulnerable people with comobirdities and public servants, while the third and final stage is aimed at the general population. The Moldovan authorities are expecting the first batch of vaccines to arrive at the end of January, with an administration possibility starting from the beginning of February.
- 25 January – A PACE resolution congratulates the smooth organisation of the 2020 presidential election, and urges the Republic of Moldova to upgrade its legislation, in accordance with the Venice Commission opinions, to improve its judiciary and to tackle corruption. The same report is concerned about the slow progress in tackling corruption and the slow pace in reforming the Moldovan judiciary.
- 19 April – The Council of Europe Action Plan for the Republic of Moldova 2021–2024 is officially signed. The Council of Europe announces its first two projects for Moldova three days later.
- 23 April – Moldovan Parliament voted to sack the head of the Moldovan constitutional court after a political standoff between the pro-EU President Maia Sandu and pro-Russian parliament members.
- 27 April – The United States issued a condemnation on Moldova Parliament's vote on the sacking of the head of the country's constitutional court, calling it as "a blatant attack on democracy".
- 28 April – Constitutional Court of Moldova cancelled calls for implementing state of emergency, enabling President Maia Sandu to dissolve the parliament and to call a snap election on 11 July.
- 11 July – 2021 Moldovan parliamentary election: The PAS wins the snap election with 52.80% (63 seats), followed by the BECS with 27.17% (32 seats) and the Șor Party with 5.74% (6 seats).
- 6 August – The Natalia Gavrilița-led cabinet was sworn in with 61 votes, all from the Party of Action and Solidarity.

== Deaths ==
- 6 January – Mihai Cotorobai, politician (b. 1951)
- 7 January – Leonid Bujor, politician (b. 1955)
