= 2001 in Moldova =

- Decades: 1980s; 1990s; 2000s; 2010s; 2020s
- See also: Other events of 2001; Timeline of Moldovan history

Events in the year 2001 in Moldova.

== Incumbents ==
- President – Petru Lucinschi, Vladimir Voronin
- Prime Minister – Dumitru Braghiș, Vasile Tarlev
- President of the Parliament – Dumitru Diacov, Eugenia Ostapciuc

== Events ==
=== February ===
- 25 February - Parliamentary elections take place.

=== April ===
- 4 April - Presidential elections take place.
- 19 April - The First Tarlev Cabinet is formed.

=== June ===
- 6–7 June - The GUAM charter is signed.

=== July ===
- 26 July – Moldova joins the World Trade Organization.

=== August ===
- 27 August - Moldova celebrated the 10th anniversary of independence.
