= 2015 in Moldova =

- Decades: 1990s; 2000s; 2010s; 2020s
- See also: Other events of 2015; Timeline of Moldovan history

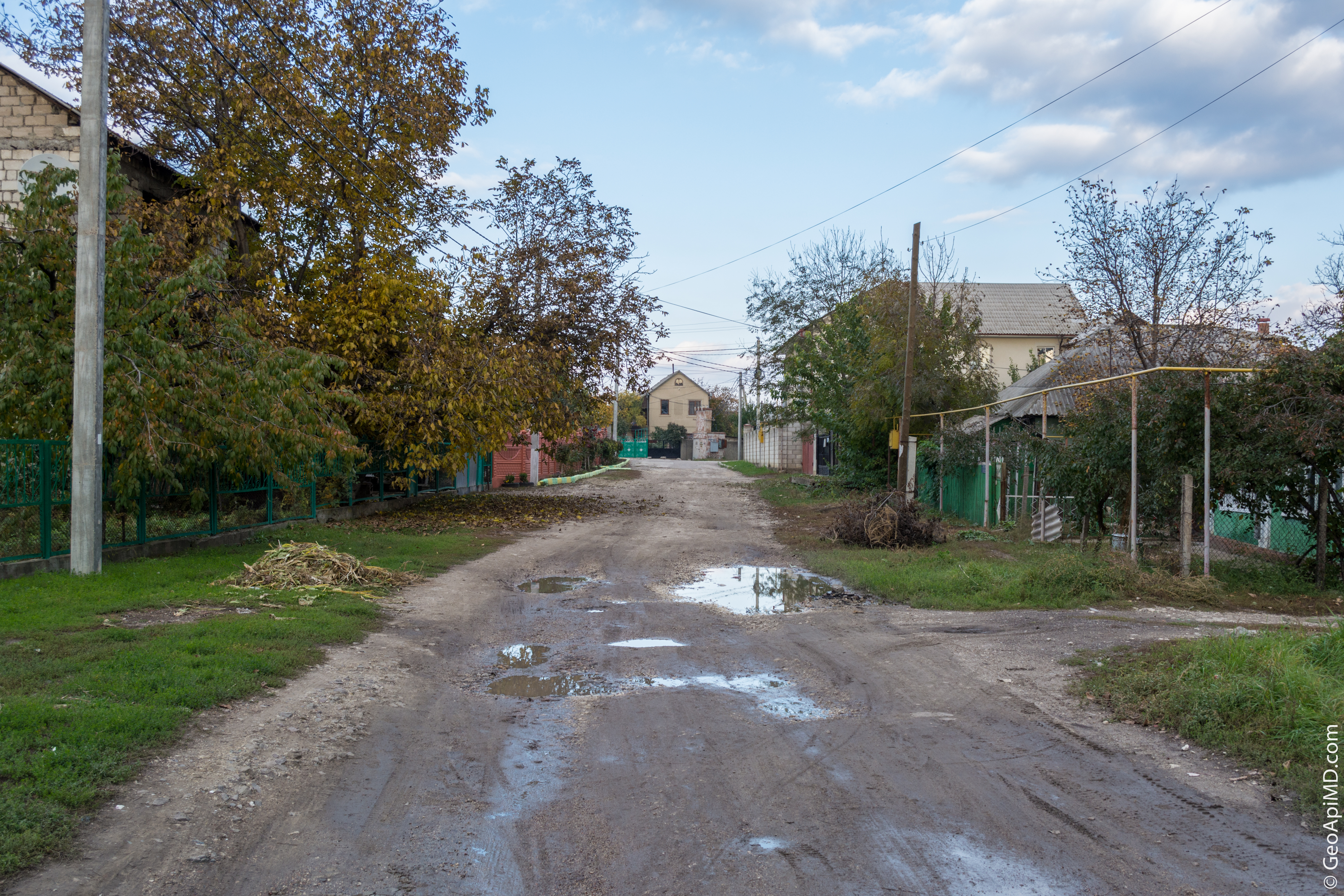

The following lists events that happened during 2015 in Moldova.

== Incumbents ==
- President: Nicolae Timofti
- Prime Minister:
  - until 18 February: Iurie Leancă
  - 18 February- 22 June: Chiril Gaburici
  - 22 June-30 July: Natalia Gherman
  - 30 July-30 October: Valeriu Streleț
  - starting 30 October: Gheorghe Brega
- President of the Parliament: Igor Corman (until January 23), Andrian Candu (starting January 23)

== Events ==
=== February ===
- 18 February - The Moldovan Parliament appoints a new government with Chiril Gaburici as Prime Minister and a legislative support formed by the PLDM, PDM and PCRM.

=== March ===
- 19 March - Moldovan authorities ban two Russian journalists, Dmitry Kiselev and Andrei Kondrashov, from the country for five years because they had planned to travel to Moldova to present a documentary sympathetic to Russia annexing the Crimea.
