= 2013 in Moldova =

- Decades: 1990s; 2000s; 2010s; 2020s
- See also: Other events of 2013; Timeline of Moldovan history

This is a list of 2013 events that occurred in Moldova.

== Incumbents ==
- President: Nicolae Timofti
- Prime Minister: Vlad Filat (until 25 April), Iurie Leancă (starting 25 April)
- President of the Parliament: Marian Lupu (until 25 April), Liliana Palihovici (25 April–30 May), Igor Corman (starting 30 May)

== Events ==
- Moldova in the Eurovision Song Contest 2013.
- 13 January - Pădurea Domnească case is made public.
