= 2002 in Moldova =

- Decades: 1980s; 1990s; 2000s; 2010s; 2020s
- See also: Other events of 2002; Timeline of Moldovan history

Events from the year 2002 in Moldova.

== Incumbents ==
- President: Vladimir Voronin
- Prime Minister: Vasile Tarlev

== Events ==
- February 8–24 - Moldova competes in the 2002 Winter Olympics in Salt Lake City.
- April 23 - The Muzeul Memoriei Neamului is established.

== Births ==
- October 6 – Cleopatra Stratan, singer
