= 2023 in Moldova =

- Decades: 2000s; 2010s; 2020s
- See also: Other events of 2023; Timeline of Moldovan history

Events from the year 2023 in Moldova.

== Incumbents ==
Photo	Post	Name
	President of Moldova	Maia Sandu
	Prime Minister of Moldova	Natalia Gavrilița (until 16 February) Dorin Recean (from 16 February)
	President of the Parliament	Igor Grosu

== Events ==
=== January ===
- 1 January:
  - The law for the 2023 state budget enters force, with the following numbers: a government revenue amassing 64.8 billion Moldovan lei, 83.1 billion lei spendings and a budget deficit of 18.3 billion lei.
  - Changes to Moldova's election code enter force, excepting those for regional elections, that are bound to enter force on 1 January 2024.
- 14 January – Due to a wave of Russian missile strikes against Ukraine during the 2022 Russian invasion of Ukraine, a missile falls within the territory of Moldova, in the village of Larga.

=== February ===
- 10 February:
  - A Russian missile launched as part of an attack against Ukrainian infrastructure crosses the airspace of Moldova.
  - Moldovan prime minister Natalia Gavrilita resigns amid an economic crisis and the collateral effects of the ongoing war in neighboring Ukraine.
- 11 February – Moldovan President Maia Sandu names pro-European Union academic Dorin Recean as the next Prime Minister of Moldova.
- 13 February – President of Moldova Maia Sandu accuses the Russian government of planning a coup d'état attempt against her.
- 14 February – 2023 Moldova and Romania high-altitude objects: Moldova temporarily closes its airspace after receiving reports of a "balloon-like object".
- 16 February - The Ministry of Energy is established.
- 22 February – Russian President Vladimir Putin revokes a 2012 foreign policy decree which respects Moldova's sovereignty in resolving the political status of the breakaway Transnistria region.

=== March ===
- 16 March – The Moldovan parliament approves a law that formally declares the country's official language as Romanian.

=== April ===
- 13 April – A Court of Appeal of the Republic of Moldova sentence the pro-Russian oligarch Ilan Shor to 15 years in prison in absentia.
- 30 April – 2023 Gagauzian gubernatorial election

=== May ===
- 21 May – Moldovan protests: More than 75,000 people gather in Chișinău to demonstrate in favor of Moldova joining the EU, following a call for the pro-European rally European Moldova National Assembly by President Maia Sandu in order to outdo anti-government and pro-Russian demonstrations organized by the opposition.

=== June ===
- 1 June – 2nd European Political Community Summit
- 12 June – Moldova and Ukraine sign an agreement to build a bridge across their border over the Dniester river between Cosăuți, Moldova, and Yampil, Ukraine, bypassing the unrecognised state of Transnistria.
- 19 June – the Șor Party was outlawed by the Constitutional Court of Moldova.
- 30 June – Chișinău International Airport shooting: Two people are killed after a man opens fire at Chișinău International Airport, Moldova. The perpetrator is wounded and detained.

Scheduled:

- 5 November – 2023 Moldovan local elections

== Sports ==
- 17 August 2022 – 28 May 2023: 2022–23 Moldovan Cup
- 26 August 2022 – May 2023: 2022–23 Moldovan Liga 1

== Deaths ==
- 9 January – Ala Melnicova, 43, singer.
- 9 January – Gheorghe Ciocoi, 80, poet, essayist and translator.
- 11 January – Alexandru Donos, 92, journalist and writer.
- 17 January – Constantin Munteanu, 72, screenwriter, writer and theater director.
- 18 January – Doina Postolachi, 43, poet and novelist, member of Moldovan Writers' Union and Writers' Union of Romania.
- 21 January – Sergiu Sumcă, 76, editor, journalist, and astrologer.
- 22 January – Ștefan Bouroșu, 32, actor.
- 13 February – Oleg Bejenar, 51, footballer (Tiligul Tiraspol, Dinamo Bender) and manager (Speranța Crihana Veche), heart attack.
- 24 February – Teodor Țîrdea, 85, professor and philosopher.
- 20 March – Iurii Lapicus, 27, mixed martial arts fighter, traffic collision.
- 22 June – Victor Pușcaș, 79, politician and jurist, MP (1990–1994) and president of the Constitutional Court (2001–2007).
- 29 June – Semion Odainic, 84, painter.

== See also ==
- 2022–2023 Moldovan protests
