= Elena Hrenova =

Russian-Moldavian politician (1950–2020)

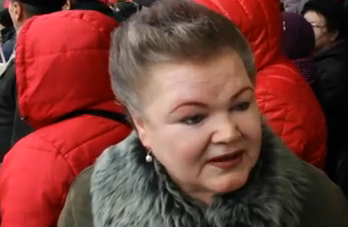
- Hrenova in 2015

Member of the Chișinău Municipal Council
- In office 20 October 2019 – 22 November 2020
- In office 5 June 2011 – 9 December 2014

Member of the Moldovan Parliament
- In office 9 December 2014 – 9 March 2019
- Parliamentary group: Party of Socialists

Personal details
- Born: 14 January 1950 Kamyshlov, Russian SFSR, Soviet Union
- Died: 22 November 2020 (aged 70) Chișinău, Moldova
- Party: Party of Socialists of the Republic of Moldova
- Other political affiliations: Party of Communists of the Republic of Moldova (until 2012)

Elena Hrenova (Russian: Елена Хренова; 14 January 1950 – 22 November 2020) was a Russian-Moldovan politician who from 2014 to 2019 was a Member of the Moldovan Parliament representing the Party of Socialists of the Republic of Moldova (PSRM). She was a member of the Parliamentary Committee on Social Protection, Health, and the Family. Previously, between 2011 and 2015, she was a councilor in the Chișinău Municipal Council.

== Biography ==
In the November 2014 parliamentary elections, Hrenova ran for the position of deputy on the 20th position in the PSRM list, obtaining the mandate of deputy in the Moldovan Parliament for the 20th legislature.

Until 29 November 2012, she was a member of the Party of Communists of the Republic of Moldova, when she left the Communists and joined the faction of the Party of Socialists of the Republic of Moldova in the municipal council. She resigned as a councilor in January 2015, in connection with the incompatibility of positions.

Hrenova was also the organizer and president of the public association "Equitate". Hrenova did not know Romanian and spoke only Russian in parliament.

On 22 November 2020, Hrenova died of COVID-19.
