= Teodor Zgureanu =

Moldovan conductor and composer (1939–2024)

Teodor Zgureanu (24 May 1939 – 6 July 2024) was a Moldovan conductor and composer.

Zgureanu was the Principal choirmaster and artistic director of Corul "Moldova" (1976–1987). He died in Chișinău on 6 July 2024, at the age of 85.
