= Efim Zubcu =

Moldovan politician (1943–2025)

Efim Zubcu (15 October 1943 – 13 November 2025) was a Moldovan politician.

== Life and career ==
Zubcu was born in Cerlina on 15 October 1943. He was a leader of the National Liberation Movement in Soroca. He served as a deputy from 2001 to 2005.

Zubcu died in Soroca on 13 November 2025, at the age of 82.
