= 1999 Moldovan constitutional referendum =

- 23 May 1999
- Would you be in favour of changing the constitution with the scope to install a presidential system in the Republic of Moldova in which the president of the Republic would be responsible for the formation and leadership of the government as well as for the results of the governing of the country?

Results
Choice	Votes	%
Yes	768,905	64.20%
No	428,706	35.80%
Valid votes	1,197,611	86.18%
Invalid or blank votes	192,120	13.82%
Total votes	1,389,731	100.00%
Registered voters/turnout	2,382,457	58.33%

A consultative constitutional referendum was held in Moldova on 23 May 1999. It was initiated by President Petru Lucinschi and asked voters whether they approved of changing the system of government to a presidential system. The proposal was approved by 64% of voters. However, the Party of Communists of the Republic of Moldova and the Alliance for Democracy and Reforms opposed Lucinschi, and were able to vote several constitutional changes through parliament on 5 July 2000. The changes reduced the powers of the president and strengthened the parliament and government.

== Question ==
Would you be in favour of changing the constitution with the scope to install a presidential system in the Republic of Moldova in which the president of the Republic would be responsible for the formation and leadership of the government as well as for the results of the governing of the country?

== Results ==
Choice	Votes	%
For	768,905	64.20
Against	428,706	35.80
Total	1,197,611	100.00
Valid votes	1,197,611	86.18
Invalid/blank votes	192,120	13.82
Total votes	1,389,731	100.00
Registered voters/turnout	2,382,457	58.33
Source: Nohlen & Stöver
