= History of Moldova =

The history of Moldova spans prehistoric cultures, ancient and medieval empires, and periods of foreign rule and modern independence.

Evidence of human habitation dates back 800,000–1.2 million years, with significant developments in agriculture, pottery, and settlement during the Neolithic and Bronze Ages. In antiquity, Moldova's location made it a crossroads for invasions by the Scythians, Goths, Huns, and other tribes, followed by periods of Roman and Byzantine control. The medieval Principality of Moldavia emerged in the 1350s, and was the medieval precursor of modern Moldova and Romania. It reached prominence under rulers like Stephen the Great before becoming a vassal state of the Ottoman Empire from 1538, until the 19th century.

In 1812, following one of several Russian–Turkish wars, the eastern half of the principality, Bessarabia, was annexed by the Russian Empire, marking the beginning of Russian influence in the region. In 1918, Bessarabia briefly became independent as the Moldavian Democratic Republic and, following the decision of the Parliament (Sfatul Țării), united with Romania. During the Second World War it was occupied by the Soviet Union which reclaimed it from Romania. It joined the Union in 1940 as the Moldavian SSR. During this period, policies of Russification and economic transformation deeply affected the region.

The dissolution of the USSR in 1991 led to declared independence, followed by the Transnistria War in 1992, a conflict that left the Transnistrian region as a de facto independent state. Moldova continues to navigate a complex relationship between pro-Western and pro-Russian factions. In recent years, it has pursued closer ties with the European Union, submitting a formal membership application in 2022.

== Prehistory ==
Cucuteni–Trypillian culture boundaries

In 2010, Oldowan flint tools were discovered at Dubasari on the lower Dniester that are 800,000–1.2 million years old demonstrating that early humans were present in Moldova during the early Paleolithic. During prehistoric times there was a succession of cultures that flourished in the land of present-day Moldova from the end of the ice age up through the Neolithic Age, the Copper Age, the Bronze Age, and the beginning of the Iron Age, when historical records begin to be made about the people who lived in these lands. These cultures included the Linear Pottery culture (ca. 5500–4500 BC), the Cucuteni–Trypillian culture (ca. 5500–2750 BC), and the Yamna culture (ca. 3600–2300 BC). During this period of time many innovations and advancements were made, including the practice of agriculture, animal husbandry, kiln-fired pottery, weaving, and the formation of large settlements and towns. Indeed, during the Cucuteni–Trypillian Culture, some of the settlements in this area were larger than anywhere on Earth at the time, and they predate even the earliest towns of Sumer in the Mesopotamia. The area, stretching from the Dnieper River in the east to the Iron Gate of the Danube in the west (which included the land now in Moldova), had a civilization as highly advanced as anywhere else on Earth during the Neolithic period.

The question as to why this area did not remain at the forefront of technological and social development lies in the subsequent history of its geographical location. At the end of the mostly peaceful Neolithic period, this area became a highway for invaders from the east moving into Europe. By the time the historical written record begins to cover this area, it has already seen a number of invasions sweep over it, leaving social and political upheaval in their wake. This trend was to continue on a fairly regular basis up until the 20th century. With so much destruction, it was difficult for the residents of this area to recover from each successive invasion before encountering the next.

== Antiquity and early Middle Ages ==
The Roman provinces of Dacia (purple) and Moesia Inferior (green)

In recorded antiquity Moldova's territory was inhabited by several tribes, mainly by Akatziri, and at different periods also by Bastarnae, Scythians and Sarmatians. Between the 1st and 7th centuries AD, the south was intermittently under the Roman, then Byzantine Empires. Due to its strategic location on a route between Asia and Europe, Moldova was repeatedly invaded by, among others, the Goths, Huns, Avars, Magyars, Pechenegs, Cumans, and the Mongols. Csaba's Khalyzian wife, mother of Ed and Edumen, was from the area. Although the First Bulgarian Empire ruled parts of Moldavia between the reign of Krum to Presian I, the territory of Moldova itself was never conquered by them. The Bulanids ruled the area from the 8th century to the 10th century. Constantine Porphyrogenitus in De Administrando Imperio refers to the territory specifically as Atelkuzu (Ατελκουζου), the Black Cuman land of the Khalyzians and Pechenegs. It was part of the Principality of Halych in the 12th and 13th centuries before falling to the Golden Horde in 1241 until the early 14th century. The colonists of the Genoa Republic also left a trace in this region. The Hypatian Chronicle mentioned the name of the Bolokhoveni (the 13th century) a purportedly Romanian population connected to Voloch, the East Slavic exonym of the Romanians. Alexandru V. Boldur identified the Bolohoveni as Romanians.

== Principality of Moldavia (1346–1862) ==
=== Founding of the Principality ===
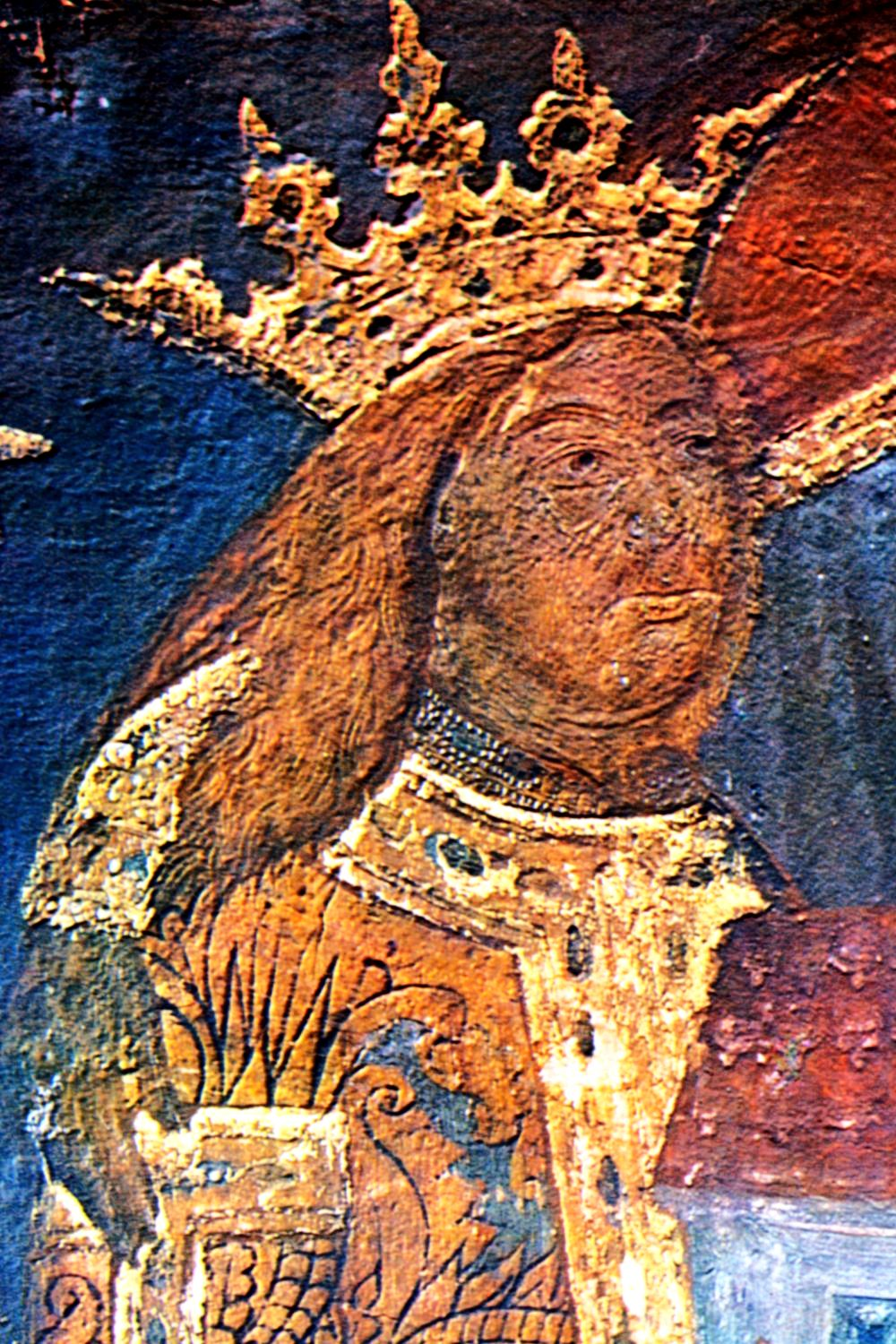
Fresco of Stephen the Great at Voroneț Monastery

The medieval Principality of Moldavia was established in 1359 and covered the so-called Carpathian–Danube–Dniester area, stretching from Transylvania in the west to the Dniester River in the east. Its territory comprised the present-day territory of the Republic of Moldova, the eastern 8 of the 41 counties of Romania (a region still called Moldova by the local population), the Chernivtsi oblast and Budjak region of Ukraine. Its nucleus was in the northwestern part, the Țara de Sus ("Upper Land"), part of which later became known as Bukovina. The name of the principality originates from the Moldova River.

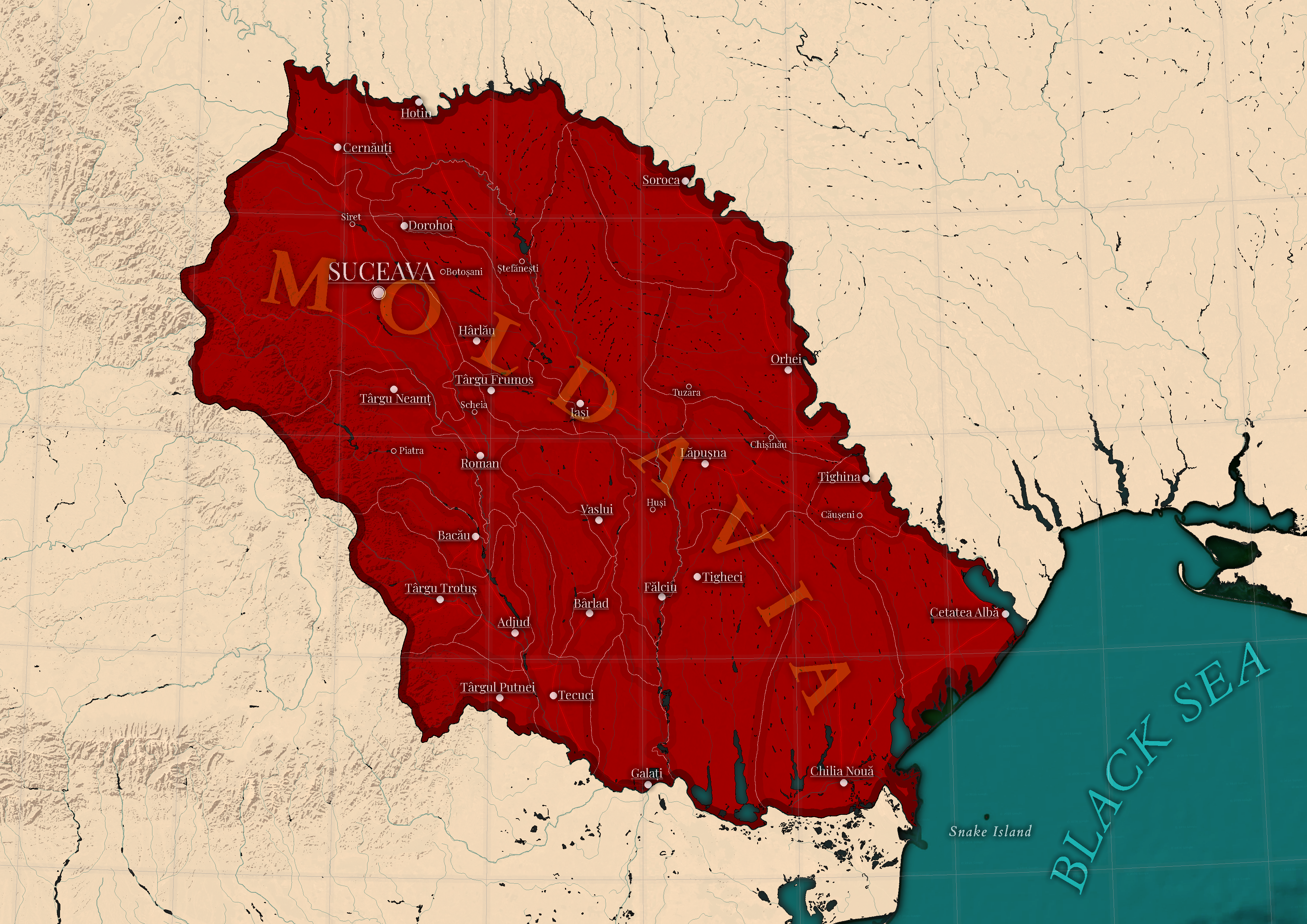
Detailed map of the principality in 1483

The foundation of Moldavia is attributed to the Vlach (an old exonym for Romanian) noblemen Dragoş of Bedeu, from the Voivodeship of Maramureș, who had been ordered in 1343 (1285 after other sources) by the Hungarian king to establish a defense for the historic Kingdom of Hungary against the Tatars, and Bogdan I of Cuhea, another Romanian from Maramureș, who became the first independent prince of Moldavia, when he rejected Hungarian authority in 1359. Bogdan I left his lands from Maramureș with his army and part of the Romanian population, by crossing the mountains to the east, after entering in conflict with the Hungarian rulers. From the 14th century onward, Turkic documents would refer to Moldova as "Kara-Boğdan", or "Black Bogdan", thanks to the success of his dynasty.

Moldova also had rich political relations with Poland. In 1387, the great hospodar of Moldova, Peter I, paid a feudal tribute to the Polish king. For the next one hundred and fifty years, relations between Moldova and Poland were periodically friendly, and only occasional conflicts.

The greatest Moldavian personality was prince Stephen the Great, who ruled from 1457 to 1504. He fought the Hungarian Kingdom, the Polish Kingdom and the Ottoman Empire, with success, for the most part of his rule.

=== Ottoman Suzerainty ===
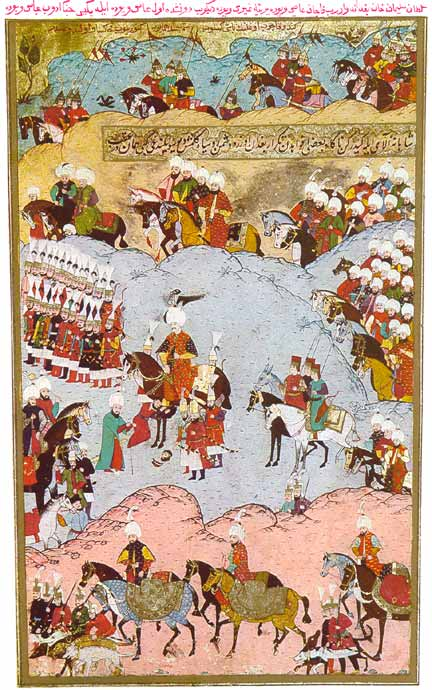
Sultan Suleiman I taking control of Moldova

Stephen III was succeeded by increasingly weaker princes, and in 1538 Moldavia became a vassal of the Ottoman Empire, to which it owed a percentage of the internal revenue, that in time rose to 10%. Moldavia was forbidden to have foreign relations to the detriment of the Ottoman Empire (although at times the country managed to circumvent this interdiction), but was allowed internal autonomy, including sole authority over foreign trade. Turks were legally forbidden to own land or build religious establishments in Moldavia. In 1574, a major uprising took place there under the treachery of John III the Terrible. Despite a number of successes, he eventually died in the Battle of Cahul and the uprising was suppressed. Prince Vasile Lupu had secured the Moldavian throne in 1634 after a series of complicated intrigues, and managed to hold it for twenty years. Lupu was a capable administrator and a brilliant financier, and soon was the richest man in the Christian East. Judiciously placed gifts kept him on good terms with the Ottoman authorities.

In the 18th century, the territory of Moldavia often became a transit or war zone during conflicts between the Ottomans, Austrians, and Russians. In 1774, following a victory in a war against the Ottomans, Russia occupied Christian Moldavia, still a vassal of the Ottoman Empire at the time. In 1775, the Habsburg monarchy annexed ca 11% of the territory of Moldavia, which became known as Bukovina. By the Treaty of Bucharest following the Russo-Turkish War (1806–1812), Russia had annexed further 50% of its territory, which became known as Bessarabia.

== Bessarabia under the Russian Empire (1812–1917) ==
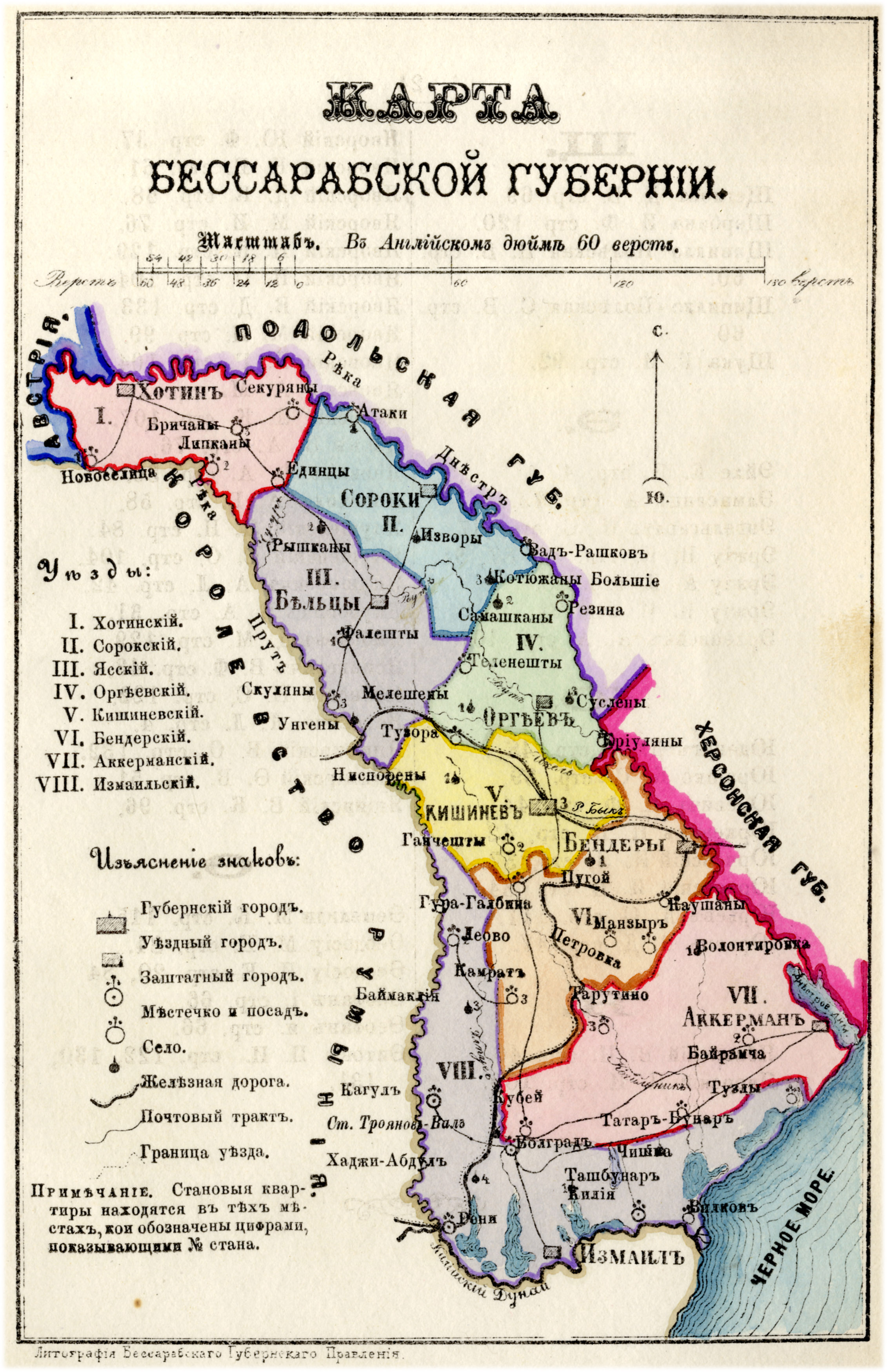
Gubernya of Bessarabia, 1883

With the notable exception of Transnistria, the territory of today's Republic of Moldova covers most of the historical region of Bessarabia. Until 1812, the term "Bessarabia" referred to the region between the Danube, Dniester, the Black Sea shores, and the Upper Trajan Wall, slightly larger than what today is called Budjak. By the Treaty of Bucharest of May 28, 1812 between the Ottoman Empire and the Russian Empire — concluding the Russo-Turkish War (1806–1812) — the latter annexed the eastern half of the Principality of Moldavia. That region was then called Bessarabia.

Initially, after being annexed by the Russian Empire, Bessarabia enjoyed a period of local autonomy until 1828. Organized as an imperial district (oblast), it was governed by a "provisional government" with two departments: a civil administration and a religious administration, the former led by the aged Moldavian boyar Scarlat Sturdza, the latter – by the archbishop Gavriil Bănulescu-Bodoni. On top of these was the Russian military administration of Governor General Harting. However, already in 1813, the civil administration was handed to the Governor General. In 1818, reform-minded Russian tsar Alexander I passed a Settlement of the establishment of the region of Bessarabia which divided the legal power between the tsar-appointed Governor General (Bakhmetiev) and a 10-member High Council of the Region with 4 members appointed by the tsar and 6 elected by the local nobility. In lieu of the older 12 lands, the region was divided into 6, later 9 counties. In 1828 however, the conservative tsar Nikolai I abrogated the Settlement and passed a new regulation which endowed the Governor General with supreme power, with the regional council having only advisory functions and meeting twice a year. Article 63 of the regulation stated that all administrative personnel must know and perform their duties in Russian. Nevertheless, Romanian language would occasionally appear in documents up to 1854.

At the end of the Crimean War, in 1856, by the Treaty of Paris, the southern parts of Bessarabia (including a part of Budjak) were returned to Moldavia, which organized the territory into the districts of Cahul, Bolgrad and Ismail. Consequently, Russia lost access to the Danube river. In 1859, the Principalities of Moldavia and Wallachia united and formed the Romanian United Principalities, a vassal state of the Ottoman Empire.

In 1870, the institution of zemstva was instated in the Bessarabian oblast. Cities, communes, counties, and the entire region would elect each a local council representing noblemen, merchants and peasants. They had substantial authority in economic and sanitary areas, including roads, posts, food, public safety and education. On the other hand, political (including justice courts of all levels) and cultural matters remained an exclusive domain of the Governor General and were used as a vehicle of Russification. With the accomplishment of these introductions, in 1871, Bessarabia was transformed into a governorate.

The defeat of the Ottoman Empire in the Russo-Turkish War (1877–1878) and the subsequent signing of the Treaty of Berlin granted independence to Romania. Although the treaty of alliance between Romania and Russia specified that Russia would defend the territorial integrity of Romania and not claim any part of Romania at the end of the war, the southern part of Bessarabia was re-annexed to Russia. In exchange, Romania was given Dobruja, which was at the time part of the Ottoman Empire.

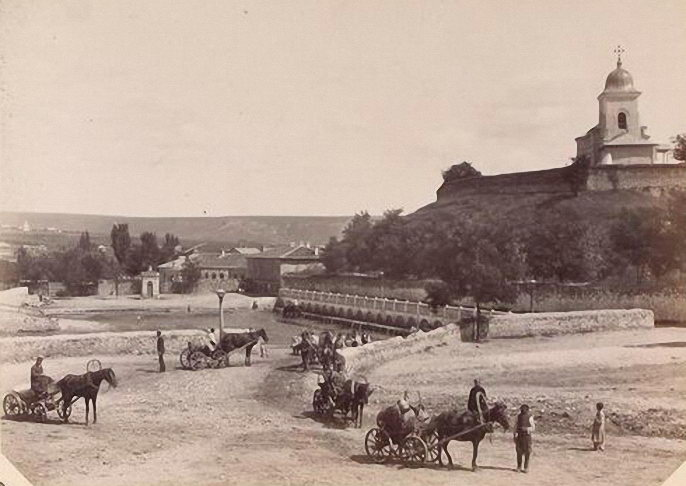
Măzărache Church in the 19th century

Public education was entrusted to the religious establishment of the region, which since 1821 had only Russian archbishops, and later also to the zemstvos. Dimitrie Sulima (Archbishop in 1821–1855), and Antonie Shokotov (1855–1871) allowed the parallel usage of both Romanian and Russian in church, and did not take any measures to infringe upon the linguistic specifics of the region. With the appointment of Pavel Lebedev (1871–1882), the situation changed radically, and the language of the locals was soon purged from the church. To prevent the printing of religious literature in Romanian, Lebedev closed down the printing press in Chișinău, collected from the region and burned the already printed books in Romanian (in the Cyrillic alphabet). The following archbishops Sergey Lapidevsky, Isakyi Polozensky, Neofit Novodchikov eased some of Lebedev's measures to help quell the serious dissatisfaction of the population. The next Archbishop Iakov Pyatnitsky (1898–1904) discovered that his desire to popularize a Christian culture and a moral education faced a language barrier, and in 1900 convinced the Russian High Synod to allow the publication of religious pamphlets in Romanian, while his follower Archbishop Vladimir allowed the printing of books, and from 1908 even of a regular religious journal "Luminătorul" by Constantin Popovici and Gurie Grosu. The last Russian Archbishops, Serafim Chichyagov (1908–1914), Platon (1914–1915) and Anastasius (1915–1918) tried to preserve the privileged status of the Russian language in the church in Bessarabia, but did not introduce any new anti-Romanian measures. In 1918, after the installation of the Romanian administration in Bessarabia, Archbishop Anastasius refused to subordinate his eparchy to the Romanian Orthodox Church, and was forced into exile. The new authorities entrusted the archbishopric to the Bishop Nicodem de Huși from Romania, who appointed a local Archbishop Dionisie Erhan. Then the Clerical Congress on February 21, 1920, elected Gurie Botoșăneanu as the highest church official in Bessarabia, which afterwards was raised from Archbishop to Metropolitan.

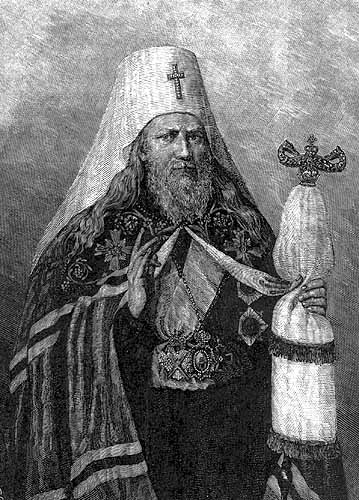
Gavriil Bănulescu-Bodoni

Under the protection of Gavriil Bănulescu-Bodoni and Dimitrie Sulima a theological school and a seminary were opened in Chișinău, and public schools throughout the region: in the cities of Chișinău, Hotin, Cetatea Albă, Briceni, Bender, Bălți, Cahul, Soroca, Orhei, at the monasteries of Dobrușa and Hârjauca, and even in several villages (Rezeni, Mereni, Volcineț, Nisporeni, Hârtop). In 1835, the tsarist authorities declared a 7-year deadline to transfer the education from Romanian to Russian. Although the measure was implemented more gradually, since 1867, Romanian was purged entirely from the education. This had the effect of keeping the peasant population of Bessarabia backward, as witnessed by the fact that in 1912 Moldavians had a literacy rate of only 10.5%, lowest among all ethnic groups of the region (63% for Bessarabian Germans, 50% for Bessarabian Jews, 40% for Russians, 31% for Bessarabian Bulgarians), with a record low 1.7% literacy rate for Moldavian women. Of the 1709 primary schools in Bessarabia in 1912, none was in the language of the main ethnic group.

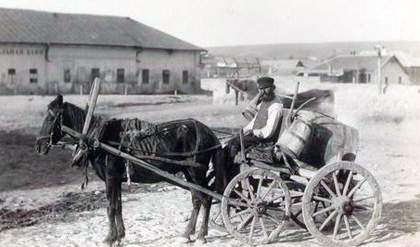
Chișinău water carrier

After 1812, the newly installed Russian authorities expelled the large Nogai Tatar population of Budjak (Little Tartary), and encouraged the settlement of Moldavians, Wallachians, Bulgarians, Ukrainians and others through various fiscal facilities and exemption from military service. The colonization was generated by the need to better exploit the resources of the land, and by the absence of serfdom in Bessarabia. German colonists from Switzerland (canton Lausanne), France, and Germany (Württemberg) settled in 27 localities (most newly settled) in Budjak, and by 1856 Bessarabian Germans were 42,216. Russian veterans of the 1828–1829 war with the Ottomans were settled in 10 localities in Budjak, and three other localities were settled by Cossacks from Dobrudja (which got there from the Dniepr region some 50 years earlier). Bessarabian Bulgarians and Gagauz arrived from modern eastern Bulgaria as early as the second half of the 18th century. In 1817, they numbered 482 families in 12 localities, in 1856 – 115,000 people in 43 localities. Ukrainians had arrived Bessarabia since before 1812, and already in the 1820s they made up one third of the population of the most northern Hotin county. In the following decades more Ukrainians settled throughout the northern part of Bessarabia from Galicia and Podolia. Jews from Galicia, Podolia and Poland also settled in Bessarabia in the 19th century, but mostly in the cities and fairs; in some of these they eventually became a plurality. In 1856, there were 78,751 Bessarabian Jews and according to the Imperial Russian census of 1897, the capital Kishinev had a Jewish population of 50,000, or 46%, out of a total of approximately 110,000. There was even an attempt by the Russian authorities to create 16 Jewish agricultural colonies, where 10,589 people would settle. However within less than 2 generations, most of them sold the land to the local Moldavians and moved to the cities and fairs. The various population movements saw an increase of the Slavic population to more than a fifth of the total population by 1920, while the proportion of the Moldovan population steadily decreased. In absence of any official records on ethnic distribution until the late 19th century, various figures for the ethnic proportions of the region have been advanced. Thus, in the 1920s Romanian historian Ion Nistor alleged that, at the beginning of the Russian administration, Moldavians represented 86% of the population. While according to official statistics speakers of Moldovan and Romanian accounted for 47.8% in 1897, some authors proposed figures as high as 70% for the beginning of the 20th century.

== Moldavian Democratic Republic (1917–1918) ==
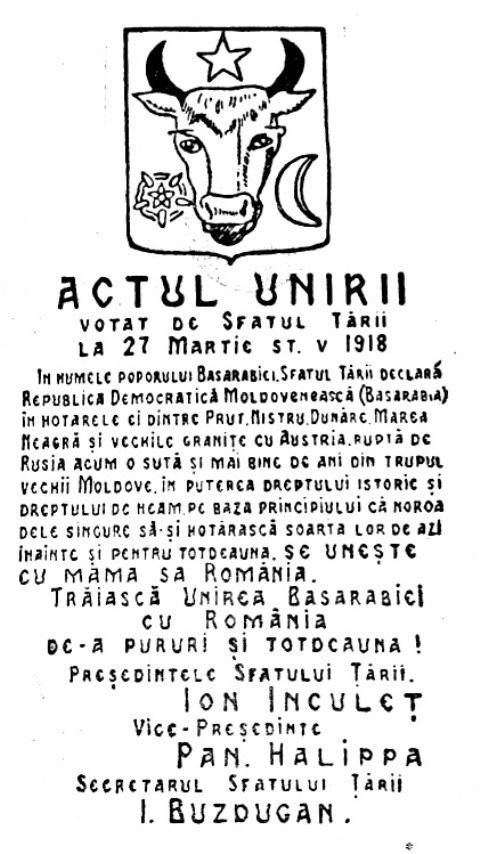
Declaration of unification of Bessarabia and Romania

After the Russian Revolution of 1905, a Romanian nationalist movement started to develop in Bessarabia. While it received a setback in 1906–1907, the movement re-emerged even stronger in 1917.

To quell the chaos brought about by the Russian revolutions of February and October 1917, a national council, Sfatul Țării, was established in Bessarabia, with 120 members elected in county meetings of peasants, and by political and professional organizations from Bessarabia. On December 15, 1917, the Council proclaimed the Moldavian Democratic Republic, as part of the Russian Republic, then formed the government of Moldavia. With the approval of the Allies and the Russian White general Dmitry Shcherbachev, commander-in-chief of the Russian forces on the Romanian Front, on January 26, 1918, Romanian troops entered Bessarabia, ostensibly as a temporary measure to maintain security, which had deteriorated due to large numbers of deserters from the Russian Army. While Romanian historiography generally asserts the intervention was done on the request of Sfatul Țării, the presence of the Romanian army in Bessarabia was protested by some of the republic's leaders, notably Ion Inculeț, president of Sfatul Țării and Pantelimon Erhan, head of the provisional Moldavian executive protesting against it. In particular they feared that big land owners-dominated Romanian Government could use the troops to prevent the envisaged Agrarian reform, a cornerstone priority of the Bessarabian government.

After this, the Council declared the independence of the Moldavian Democratic Republic on 6 February [O.S. 24 January] 1918. Under pressure from the Romanian army, on 9 April [O.S. 27 March] 1918, Sfatul Țării, by a vote of 86 to 3, with 36 abstentions, approved a conditional Union of Bessarabia with Romania. Conditions included territorial autonomy of Bessarabia, an agrarian reform, respect for human freedoms and general amnesty. Nevertheless, as early as the summer of 1918 the Romanian government began encroaching on the existing forms of local autonomy. Thus, the members of the zemstvos were appointed by royal decree, rather than being elected, as had been the case during the Russian rule. The province was subordinated to a royal-appointed General Commissar, and Sfatul Țării was relegated to a consultative position. Furthermore, the state of siege was declared throughout Bessarabia and censorship was instated. Under the pressure of the Romanian central government, worried about the growing dissatisfaction with its administration of the region and the strengthening of the autonomist current, the conditions were nominally dropped by the Sfatul Țării in December 1918. The vote was taken in the presence of only 44 of the 125 members, or, according to other sources, 48 of 160; lacking a quorum, the vote was judged to be illegitimate by some.

The union was recognized by Britain, France and Italy, but not by the Soviet government, which claimed the area as the Bessarabian Soviet Socialist Republic, and argued the union was made under conditions of Romanian military occupation by a Council that had not been elected by the people of Bessarabia in elections.

== Union with Romania and the Interwar Period (1918–1940) ==
The administrative map of Greater Romania in 1930

After 1918 Bessarabia was under Romanian jurisdiction for the next 22 years. This fact was recognized in the 1920 Treaty of Paris which, however, has never come into force since it was not ratified by Japan. The newly communist Russia did not recognize the Romanian rule over Bessarabia. The Bessarabian Soviet Socialist Republic was proclaimed on May 5, 1919, in Odesa as a "Provisional Workers' and Peasants' Government in exile" and established on May 11, 1919, in Tiraspol as an autonomous part of Russian SFSR. Furthermore, Russia and later, the Soviet Union, considered the region to be Soviet territory under foreign occupation and conducted numerous diplomatic attempts to reclaim it. No diplomatic relations existed between the two states until 1934. During that time, both countries subscribed to the principle of non-violent resolution of territorial disputes in the Kellogg-Briand Treaty of 1928 and the Treaty of London of July 1933. Meanwhile, the neighboring region of Transnistria, part of the Ukrainian SSR at the time, was formed into the Moldavian ASSR after the failure of the Tatarbunary Uprising in 1924.

The land reform, implemented by Sfatul Țării in 1918–1919, resulted in a rise of a middle class, as 87% of the region's population lived in rural areas. The reform was however marred by the small size of the awarded plots, as well as by preferential allotment of land to politicians and administrative personnel who had supported the political goals of the Romanian government. Generally, urban development and industry were insignificant, and the region remained primarily an agrarian rural region throughout the interwar period. Certain improvements were achieved in the area of education, the literacy rate rising from 15.6% in 1897 to 37% by 1930; however, Bessarabia continued to lag behind the rest of the country, the national literacy rate being 60%. During the inter-war period, Romanian authorities also conducted a program of Romanianization that sought to assimilate ethnic minorities throughout the country. The enforcement of this policy was especially pervasive in Bessarabia due to its highly diverse population, and resulted in the closure of minority educational and cultural institutions.

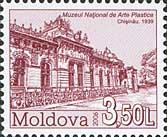
Museum of Fine Arts, 1939

On 1 January 1919 the Municipal Conservatory (the Academy of Music) was created in Chişinău, in 1927 – the Faculty of Theology, in 1934 the subsidiary of the Romanian Institute of social sciences, in 1939 – municipal picture gallery. The Agricultural State University of Moldova was founded in 1933 in Chișinău. The Museum of Fine Arts was founded in 1939 by the sculptor Alexandru Plămădeală. Gurie Grosu was the first Metropolitan of Bessarabia.

The first scheduled flights to Chișinău started on 24 June 1926, on the route Bucharest – Galați – Iași – Chișinău. The flights were operated by Compagnie Franco-Roumaine de Navigation Aérienne – CFRNA, later LARES.

The first society of the Romanian writers in Chișinău was formed in 1920, among the members were Mihail Sadoveanu, Ștefan Ciobanu, Tudor Pamfile, Nicolae Dunăreanu, N.N.Beldiceanu, Apostol D.Culea. Writer and Journalist Bessarabian Society took an institutionalized form in 1940. The First Congress of the Society elected as president Pan Halippa as Vice President Nicolae Spătaru, and as secretary general Nicolae Costenco.

Viața Basarabiei was founded in 1932 by Pan Halippa. Radio Basarabia was launched on 8 October 1939, as the second radio station of the Romanian Radio Broadcasting Company. The Capitoline Wolf was opened in 1926 and in 1928 the Stephen the Great Monument, by the sculptor Alexandru Plămădeală, was opened.

== World War II and Soviet era (1940–1991) ==
=== The formation of Soviet Moldavia ===
After the establishment of the Soviet Union in December 1922, the Soviet government moved in 1924 to establish the Moldavian Autonomous Oblast on the lands to the east of the Dniester River in the Ukrainian SSR. The capital of the oblast was Balta, situated in present-day Ukraine. Seven months later, the oblast was upgraded to the Moldavian Autonomous Soviet Socialist Republic (Moldavian ASSR or MASSR), even though its population was only 30% ethnic Romanian. The capital remained at Balta until 1929, when it was moved to Tiraspol.

In the secret protocol attached to the 1939 Molotov–Ribbentrop Pact defining the division of the spheres of influence in Eastern Europe, Nazi Germany declared it had no political interest in Bessarabia, in response to the Soviet Union's expression of interest, thereby consigning Bessarabia to the Soviet "sphere". On June 26, 1940, the Soviet government issued an ultimatum to the Romanian minister in Moscow, demanding Romania immediately cede Bessarabia and Northern Bukovina. Italy and Germany, which needed a stable Romania and access to its oil fields, urged King Carol II to do so. On June 28, Soviet troops crossed the Dniester and occupied Bessarabia, Northern Bukovina, and the Hertsa region.

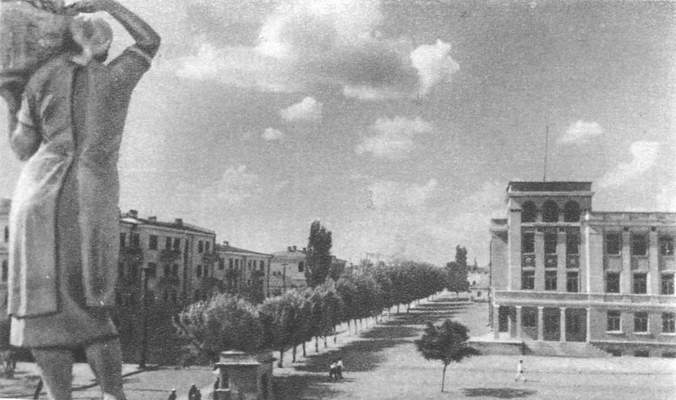
Tiraspol, 1941

The Soviet republic created following annexation did not follow Bessarabia's traditional border. The Moldavian Soviet Socialist Republic (Moldavian SSR), established on August 2, 1940, consisted of six and a half counties of Bessarabia joined with the westernmost part of the already extant MASSR (an autonomous entity within the Ukrainian SSR). Various changes were made to its borders, which were finally settled by November 1940. Territories where ethnic Ukrainians formed a large portion of the population (parts of Northern Bukovina and parts of Hotin, Akkerman, and Izmail) went to Ukraine, while a small strip of Transnistria east of the Dniester with a significant (49% of inhabitants) Moldovan population was joined to the MSSR. The transfer of Bessarabia's Black Sea and Danube frontage to Ukraine insured its control by a stable Soviet republic. This transfer, along with the division of Bessarabia, was also designed to discourage future Romanian claims and irredentism.

Under early Soviet rule, deportations of locals to the northern Urals, to Siberia, and Kazakhstan occurred regularly throughout the Stalinist period, with the largest ones on 12–13 June 1941, and 5–6 July 1949, accounting for 19,000 and 35,000 deportees respectively (from MSSR alone). In 1940–1941, ca. 90,000 inhabitants of the annexed territories were subject to political persecutions, such as arrests, deportations, or executions.

By participating in the 1941 Axis invasion of the Soviet Union, pro-German Romania seized the lost territories of Bessarabia, Northern Bukovina, as well as those of the former MASSR, and established its administration there. In occupied Transnistria, Romanian forces, working with the Germans, deported ca. 147,000 Jews from the territories of Bessarabia and Bukovina, of whom over 90,000 perished in ghettoes and concentration camps.

By April 1944, successful offensives of the Soviet Army occupied northern Moldavia and Transnistria, and by the end of August 1944 the entire territory was under Soviet control, with Soviet Army units entering Kishinev on 24 August 1944. The Paris peace treaty signed in February 1947 fixed the Romanian-Soviet border to the one established in June 1940.

The territory remained part of the Soviet Union after World War II as the Moldavian Soviet Socialist Republic. Soviet Union created the universal educational system, brought high-tech industry and science. Most of these industries were built in Transnistria and around large cities, while in the rest of the republic agriculture was developed. By the late Soviet period, the urban intelligentsia and government officials were dominated mostly by ethnic Moldovans, while Russians and Ukrainians made up most of the technical and engineering specialists.

=== Post-WWII Moldavia ===
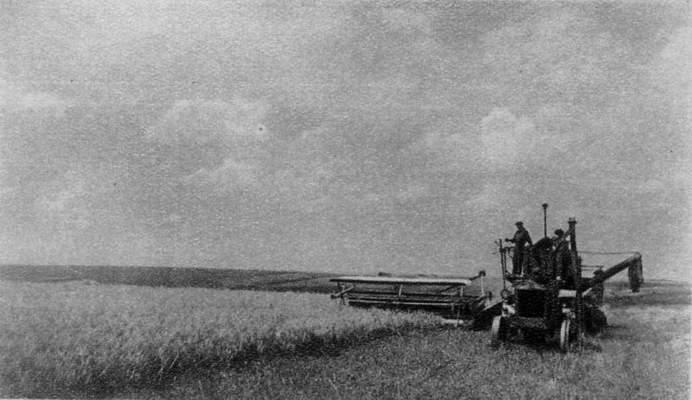
Agriculture in Moldova, 1941

The conditions imposed during the reestablishment of Soviet rule became the basis of deep resentment toward Soviet authorities, manifested in numerous resistance movements to Soviet rule. In 1946, as a result of a severe drought and excessive delivery quota obligations and requisitions imposed by the Stalin regime, the southwestern part of the USSR suffered from a major famine resulting in a minimum of 115,000 deaths among the peasants. During Leonid Brezhnev's 1950–1952 tenure as the First Secretary of the Communist Party of Moldavia (CPM), he was ruthless compared to his predecessor Nicolae Coval in putting down numerous resistance groups, and issuing harsh sentences. During the Operation North, 723 families (2,617 persons) were deported from the Moldavian SSR, on the night of March 31 to April 1, 1951, members of Neoprotestant sects, mostly Jehovah's Witnesses, qualified as religious elements considered a potential danger for the communist regime.

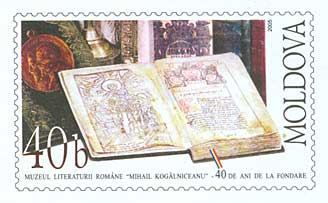
Romanian Literature Museum, Chișinău

Most political and academic positions were given to members of non-Romanian ethnic groups (only 17.5% of the Moldavian SSR's political leaders were ethnic Romanians in 1940).

In March 1953, Stalin died and 1956, the Khrushchev thaw began. It had impacts on the question of national identity in Soviet Moldavia in the framework of the internal Soviet debates unleashed by the 'Secret Speech' and by the Hungarian Revolution (23 October – 4 November 1956).
Although Brezhnev and other CPM first secretaries were largely successful in suppressing Romanian irredentism in the 1950s–1980s, Mikhail Gorbachev's administration facilitated the revival of the movement in the region. His policies of glasnost and perestroika created conditions in which nationalistic feelings could be openly expressed and in which the Soviet republics could consider reforms.

In the 1970s and 1980s Moldova received substantial investment from the budget of the USSR to develop industrial, scientific facilities, as well as housing. In 1971 the Council of Ministers of the USSR adopted a decision "About the measures for further development of Kishinev city" that secured more than one billion roubles of funds for Chisinau alone from the USSR budget. Subsequent decisions directed large amounts of funds and brought qualified specialists from all over the USSR to further develop the Moldavian SSR. Such an allocation of USSR assets was influenced by the fact that the-then leader of the Soviet Union, Leonid Brezhnev, was the First Secretary of the local Communist Party in the 1950s. These investments stopped in 1991 with the dissolution of the Soviet Union, when Moldova became independent.

=== Perestroika and Glasnost ===
In the climate of Mikhail Gorbachev's perestroika and glasnost, national sentiment escalated in the Moldavian SSR in 1988. In 1989, the Popular Front of Moldova was formed as an association of independent cultural and political groups and gained official recognition. The Popular Front organized a number of large demonstrations, which led to the designation of Moldovan as the official language of the MSSR on August 31, 1989, and a return to the Latin alphabet.

However, opposition was growing to the increasingly exclusionary nationalist policies of the Popular Front, especially in Transnistria, where the Yedinstvo-Unitatea (Unity) Intermovement had been formed in 1988 by Slavic minorities, and in the south, where the organization Gagauz Halkı (Gagauz People), formed in November 1989, came to represent the Gagauz, a Turkic-speaking minority there.

The first democratic elections to the Moldavian SSR's Supreme Soviet were held on February 25, 1990. Runoff elections were held in March. The Popular Front won a majority of the votes. After the elections, Mircea Snegur, a reformed communist, was elected chairman of the Supreme Soviet; in September he became president of the republic.

=== The Path of Independence ===
The reformist government that took over in May 1990 made many changes that did not please the minorities, including changing the republic's name in June from the Moldavian Soviet Socialist Republic to the Soviet Socialist Republic of Moldova and declaring it sovereign the following month. At the same time, Romanian tricolor with the Moldavian coat-of-arms was adopted as the state flag, and Deșteaptă-te române!, the Romanian anthem, became the anthem of the SSRM. During that period a Movement for unification of Romania and the Republic of Moldova became active in each country.

In August 1990, there was a refusal of the increasingly nationalist republican government to grant cultural and territorial autonomy to Gagauzia and Transnistria, two regions populated primarily by ethnic minorities. In response, the Gagauz Autonomous Soviet Socialist Republic was declared in the south, in the city of Comrat. In September in Tiraspol, the main city on the east bank of the Dniester River, the Pridnestrovian Moldavian Soviet Socialist Republic (commonly called Transnistria) followed suit. The parliament of Moldova immediately declared these declarations null and void.

By mid-October 1990, Moldovan nationalist volunteers had been mobilized to be sent to Gagauzia (approximately 30,000 volunteers participated there) and Transnistria. However, negotiations in Moscow between the Gagauz and Transnistrian leadership, and the government of the Soviet Socialist Republic of Moldova failed.

In May 1991, the country's official name was changed to the Republic of Moldova (Republica Moldova). The name of the Supreme Soviet also was changed, to the Moldovan Parliament.

During the 1991 Soviet coup d'état attempt in Moscow against Mikhail Gorbachev, commanders of the Soviet Union's Southwestern Theater of Military Operations attempted to impose a state of emergency in Moldova. They were overruled by the Moldovan government, which declared its support for Russian president Boris Yeltsin, who led the counter-coup in Moscow.

== Republic of Moldova (1991–present) ==
=== Independent country and Transnistria conflict ===
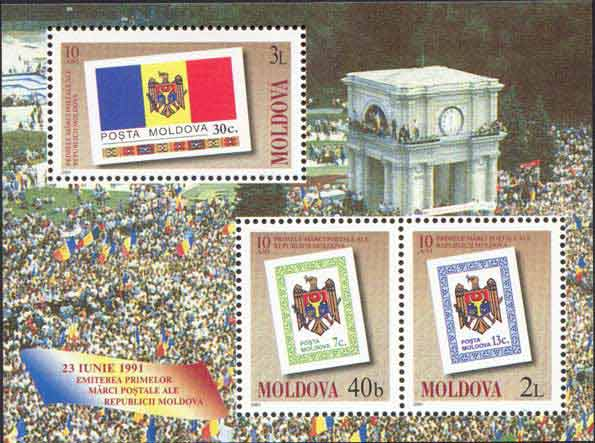
Triumphal Arch

On 27 August 1991, following the coup's collapse, Moldova declared its independence from the Soviet Union. Post-Soviet countries have signed a series of treaties and agreements to settle the legacy of the former Soviet Union multilaterally and bilaterally.

The December elections of Stepan Topal and Igor Smirnov as presidents of Gagauzia and Transnistria respectively, and the official dissolution of the Soviet Union at the end of the year, had further increased tensions in Moldova.

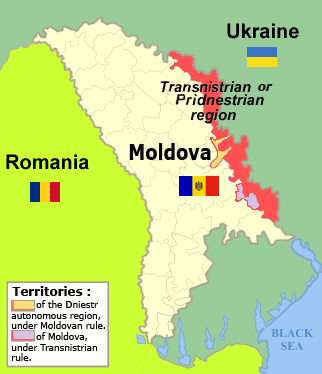
Transnistrian region of Moldova

Transnistria is the region east of the Dniester River, which includes a large proportion of predominantly Russophone ethnic Russians and Ukrainians (51%, as of 1989, with ethnic Moldovans forming a 40% minority). The headquarters of the Soviet 14th Guards Army was located in the regional capital Tiraspol. There, on September 2, 1990, local authorities proclaimed an independent Pridnestrovian Moldavian Soviet Socialist Republic. The motives behind this move were fear of the rise of nationalism in Moldova and the country's expected reunification with Romania upon secession from the USSR. In the winter of 1991–1992 clashes occurred between Transnistrian forces and the Moldovan police. Between March 2 and July 26, 1992, the conflict escalated into a military engagement. Following Russian intervention of the 14th Guards Army into the conflict on the side of the separatists, the war was stopped and the Moscow Agreement on the principles of peace settlement of armed conflict in Trans-Dniester districts of the republic of Moldova was signed on 21 July 1992.

As of 2007, the Russian military remains in Transnistria, despite Russia having signed international agreements to withdraw, and against the will of Moldovan government. The government of Moldova continues to offer extensive autonomy to Transnistria, while the government of Transnistria demands independence. De jure, Transnistria is internationally recognized as part of Moldova, but de facto, the Moldovan government does not exercise any control over the territory.

=== Early years of independence (1991–2001) ===
On 8 December 1991, Mircea Snegur, an ex-communist reformer, ran an unopposed election for the presidency. On March 2, 1992, the country achieved formal recognition as an independent state at the United Nations.

In 1992, Moldova became involved in a brief conflict against local insurgents in Transnistria, who were aided by the Russian 14th Guards Army and Russian, Ukrainian and Don Cossack volunteers, which resulted in the failure of Moldova, supported by Romania, to regain control over the breakaway republic.

Starting 1993, Moldova began to distance itself from Romania. The 1994 Constitution of Moldova used the term "Moldovan language" instead of "Romanian" and changed the national anthem to "Limba noastră".

On January 2, 1992, Moldova introduced a market economy, liberalizing prices, which resulted in huge inflation. From 1992 to 2001, the young country suffered its worst economic crisis, leaving most of the population below the poverty line. In 1993, a national currency, the Moldovan leu, was introduced to replace the Soviet rouble. The end of the planned economy also meant that industrial enterprises would have to buy supplies and sell their goods by themselves, and most of the management was unprepared for such a change. Moldova's industry, especially machine building, became all but defunct, and unemployment skyrocketed. The economic fortunes of Moldova began to change in 2001; since then the country has seen a steady annual growth of between 5% and 10%. In the early 2000s, there was also a considerable growth of emigration of Moldovans looking for work (mostly illegally) in Italy, Portugal, Spain, Greece, Cyprus, Turkey, Russia and other countries. Remittances from Moldovans abroad account for almost 38% of Moldova's GDP, the second-highest percentage in the world. Officially, Moldova's annual GDP is on the order of $1,000 per capita; however, a significant part of the economy goes unregistered as a result of corruption.

The pro-nationalist governments of prime ministers Mircea Druc (May 25, 1990 – May 28, 1991), and Valeriu Muravschi (May 28, 1991 – July 1, 1992), were followed by a more moderate government of Andrei Sangheli, during which there was a decline of the pro-Romanian nationalist sentiment. After the 1994 elections, Moldovan Parliament adopted measures that distanced Moldova from Romania. The new Moldovan Constitution also provided for autonomy for Transnistria and Gagauzia. On December 23, 1994, the Parliament of Moldova adopted a "Law on the Special Legal Status of Gagauzia", and in 1995 it was constituted.

After winning the presidential elections of 1996, on January 15, 1997, Petru Lucinschi, the former First Secretary of the Moldavian Communist Party in 1989–91, became the country's second president. After the legislative elections on March 22, 1998, the Alliance for Democracy and Reform was formed by non-Communist parties. However, the term of the new government of Prime Minister Ion Ciubuc (January 24, 1997– February 1, 1999) was marked by chronic political instability, which prevented a coherent reform program. The 1998 financial crisis in Russia, Moldova's main economic partner at the time, produced an economic crisis in the country. The standard of living plunged, with 75% of population living below the poverty line, while the economic disaster caused 600,000 people to emigrate.

New governments were formed by Ion Sturza (February 19 – November 9, 1999) and Dumitru Braghiş (December 21, 1999 – April 19, 2001). On July 21, 2000, the Parliament adopted an amendment to the Constitution that transformed Moldova from a presidential to a parliamentary republic, in which the president is elected by three fifths of the votes in the parliament, and no longer directly by the people.

=== Dominance of the Communists (2001–2009) ===
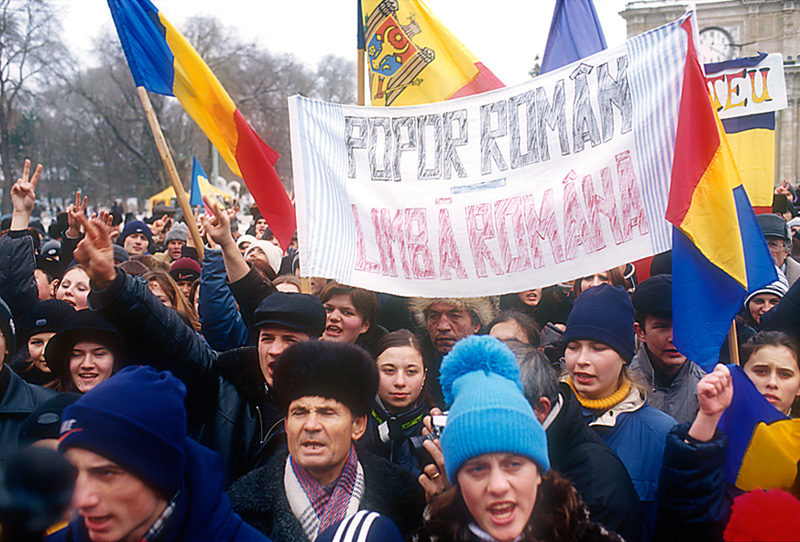
2002 protests

Only 3 of the 31 political parties won more than the 6% of the popular vote required to win seats in parliament in the February 25, 2001 elections. Winning 49.9% of the vote, the Party of Communists of the Republic of Moldova (reinstituted in 1993 after being outlawed in 1991), gained 71 of the 101 parliament seats, and elected Vladimir Voronin as the country's third president on April 4, 2001. A new government was formed on April 19, 2001, by Vasile Tarlev. The country became the first post-Soviet state where a non-reformed communist party returned to power. In March–April 2002, the opposition Christian-Democratic People's Party organized a mass protest in Chișinău against the plans of the government to fulfill its electoral promise and introduce Russian as the second state language along with its compulsory study in schools. The government annulled these plans.

The relationship between Moldova and Russia deteriorated in November 2003 over a Russian proposal for the solution of the Transnistria conflict, which Moldovan authorities refused to accept because it stipulated a 20-year Russian military presence in Moldova. The federalization plan for Moldova would have also turned Transnistria and Gagauzia into a blocking minority over all major policy matters of Moldova. As of 2006, approximately 1,200 of the 14th Army personnel remain stationed in Transnistria, guarding a large ammunitions depot at Colbasna. In recent years, negotiations between the Transnistrian and Moldovan leaders have been going on under the mediation of the Organization for Security and Co-operation in Europe (OSCE), Russia, and Ukraine; lately observers from the European Union and the United States have become involved, creating a 5+2 format.

In the wake of the November 2003 deadlock with Russia, a series of shifts in the external policy of Moldova occurred, targeted at rapprochement with the European Union. In the context of the EU's expansion to the east, Moldova wants to sign the Stability and Association Agreement. It implemented its first three-year action plan within the framework of the European Neighborhood Policy (ENP) of the EU.

In the March 2005 elections, the Party of the Communists (PCRM) won 46% of the vote, (56 of the 101 seats in the Parliament), the Democratic Moldova Block (BMD) won 28.5% of the vote (34 MPs), and the Christian Democratic People Party (PPCD) won 9.1% (11 MPs). On April 4, 2005, Vladimir Voronin was re-elected as country's president, supported by a part of the opposition, and on April 8, Vasile Tarlev was again appointed head of government. On March 31, 2008, Vasile Tarlev was replaced by Zinaida Greceanîi as head of the government.

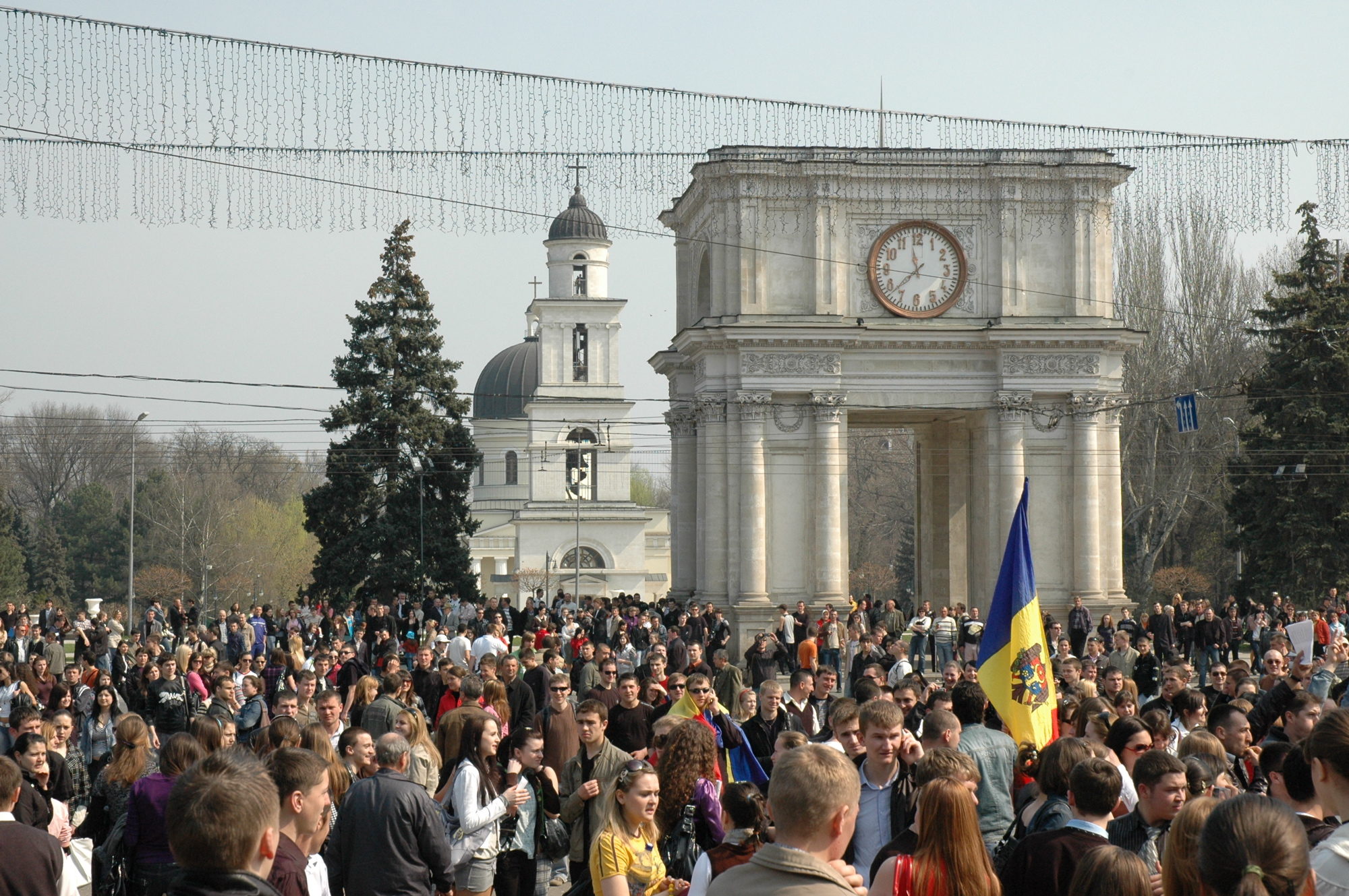
2009 civil unrest

Following the parliamentary elections on April 5, 2009, the Communist Party won 49.48% of the votes, followed by the Liberal Party with 13.14% of the votes, the Liberal Democratic Party with 12.43% and the Alliance "Moldova Noastră" with 9.77%. The opposition leaders have protested against the outcome calling it fraudulent and demanded a repeated election. A preliminary report by OSCE observers called the vote generally free and fair. However, one member of the OSCE observation team expressed concerns over that conclusion and said that she and a number of other team members feel that there had been some manipulation, but they were unable to find any proof.

On April 6, 2009, several NGOs and opposition parties organized a protest in Chișinău, gathering a crowd of about 15,000 with the help of social network sites such as Twitter and Facebook. The protesters accused the Communist government of electoral fraud. Anti-communist and pro-Romanian slogans were widely used. The demonstration had spun out of control on April 7 and escalated into a riot when a part of the crowd attacked the presidential offices and broke into the parliament building, looting and setting its interior on fire. Police had regained control on the night of April 8, arresting and detaining several hundred protesters. Numerous detainees reported beatings by the police when released. The violence on both sides (demonstrators and police) was condemned by the OSCE and other international organizations. Three young people died during the day the protests took place. The opposition blamed police abuse for these deaths, while the government claimed they were either unrelated to the protests, or accidents. Government officials, including President Vladimir Voronin, called the rioting a coup d'état attempt and accused Romania of organizing it. The opposition accused the government of organizing the riots by introducing agents provocateurs among the protesters. The political climate in Moldova remained unstable. The parliament failed to elect a new president. For this reason, the parliament was dissolved and new general elections were held on July 29, 2009, with the Communists losing power to the Alliance for European Integration, a pro-European coalition.

=== Liberal Democrat and Socialist administrations (2009–2020) ===
An attempt by the new ruling coalition to amend the constitution of Moldova via a referendum in 2010 in order to enable presidential election by popular vote failed due to lack of turnout. The parliamentary election in November 2010 had retained the status quo between the ruling coalition and the communist opposition. On 16 March 2012, parliament elected Nicolae Timofti as president by 62 votes out of 101, with the PCRM boycotting the election, putting an end to a political crisis that had lasted since April 2009. Moldova had no had full-time president, but three acting presidents, since Vladimir Voronin resigned in September 2009. In the November 2014 elections the pro-European parties maintained their majority in parliament.

In November 2016, pro-Russia candidate Igor Dodon won the presidential election, defeating his rival Maia Sandu. The 2019 parliamentary election resulted a vote split between pro-Western and pro-Russian forces. The opposition Socialists, who favor closer ties to Moscow, became the largest party with 35 out of 101 seats. The ruling Social Democratic Party, which wants closer integration with the EU, came second with 30 seats. Opposition bloc called ACUM, campaigning with anti-corruption agenda, was third with 26 seats. In 2019, from 7 June to 15 June, the Moldovan government went through a period of dual power in what is known as the 2019 Moldovan constitutional crisis. In November 2019, Ion Chicu became new Prime Minister, following the fall of the former government led by pro-Western Maia Sandu.

==== COVID-19 pandemic ====
In March 2020, due to the COVID-19 pandemic, the government called a "national red code alert" as the number of coronavirus cases in the country rose to six on 13 March 2020. Government "banned all gatherings of over 50 people until 1 April 2020 and closed all schools and kindergartens in an attempt to curb the spread of the virus". Flights were banned to Spain, Italy, France, Austria, Belgium, Czech Republic, Cyprus, Germany, Ireland, the U.K., Poland, Portugal and Romania. On 17 March, Parliament declared a state of emergency for at least 60 days, suspended all international flights and closed borders with neighbours Romania and Ukraine. Moldova reported 29 cases of the disease on 17 March 2020. The country reported its first death from the disease on 18 March 2020, when the total number of cases reached 30.

According to the World Health Organization, between 3 January 2020 and 28 June 2023, there have been 620,717 confirmed cases of COVID-19 with 12,124 deaths. As of 11 July 2023, a total of 2,288,948 vaccine doses have been administered. Moldova is among the first countries in the WHO European Region to conduct a COVID-19 intra-action review (IAR) upon the request of Moldova's Ministry of Health, Labour and Social Protection.

=== Presidency of Maia Sandu (since 2020) ===
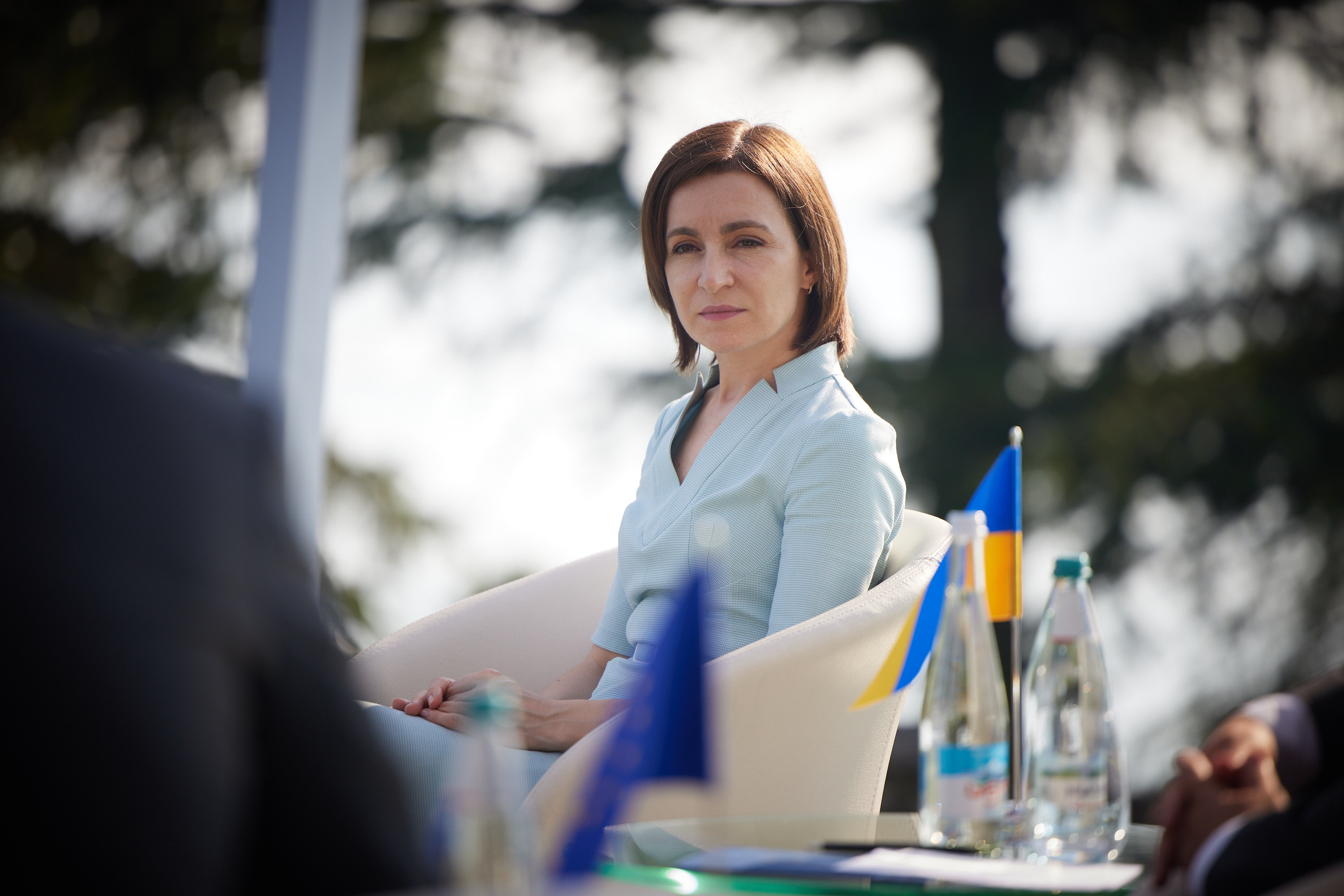
Maia Sandu at Batumi International Conference, on 19 July 2021.

In the November 2020 presidential election, the pro-European opposition candidate Maia Sandu was elected as the new president of the republic, becoming the first female elected president of Moldova. Prime Minister Ion Chicu resigned a day before Sandu was sworn in. The parliament, dominated by pro-Russian Socialists, did not accept any Prime Minister candidate proposed by the new president.

On 28 April 2021, Sandu dissolved the Parliament of the Republic of Moldova after the Constitutional Court ended Moldova's state of emergency which had been brought about by the coronavirus pandemic. Parliamentary elections took place on 11 July 2021. The snap parliamentary elections resulted in a landslide win for the pro-European Party of Action and Solidarity (PAS).

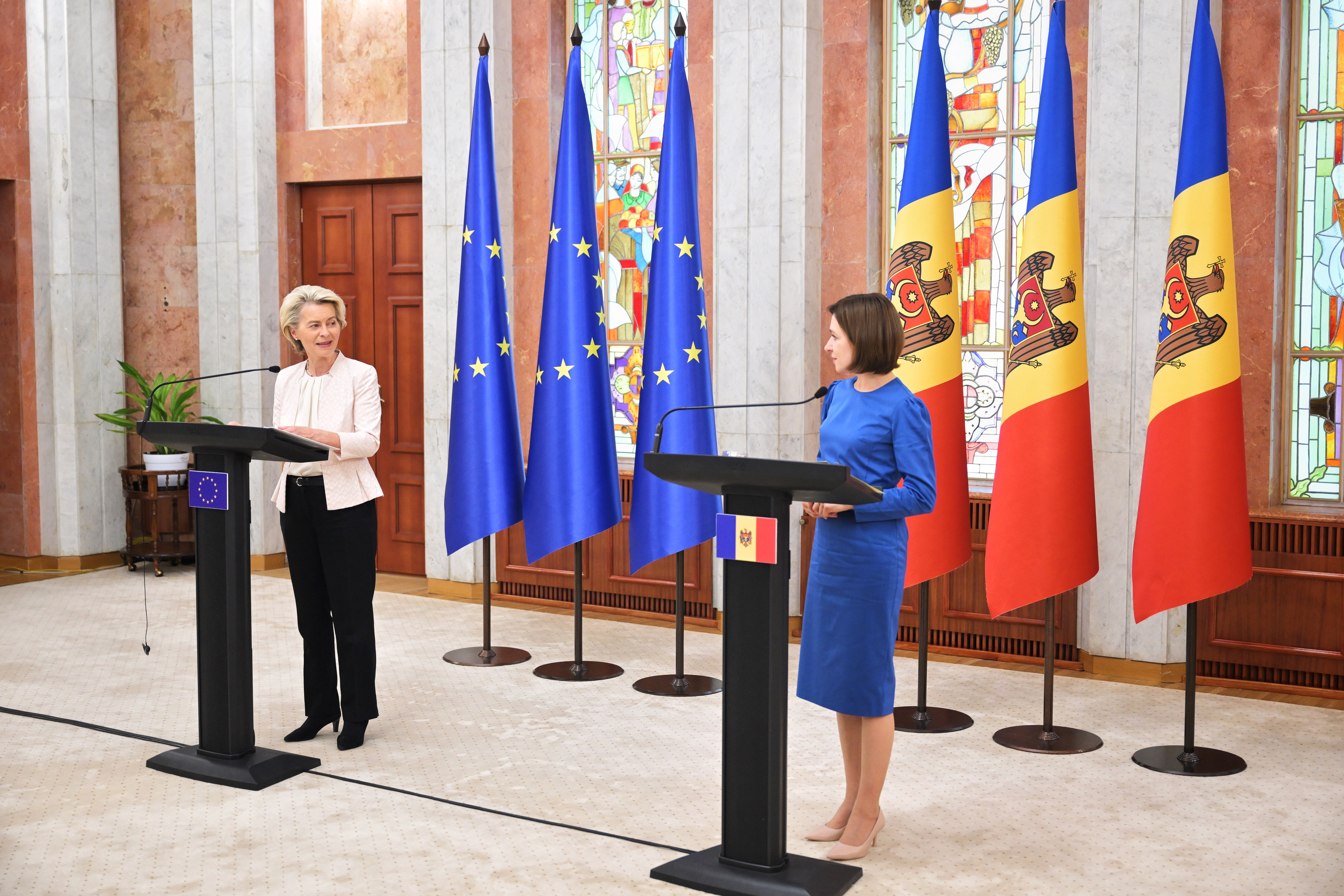
Ursula von der Leyen, President of the European Commission, and Maia Sandu, President of Moldova on 31 May 2023.

Since Maia Sandu was elected, the country has pursued the goal of full membership of the European Union by 2030 as well as deeper co-operation with NATO. This resulted in Moldova signing the membership application to join the EU on 3 March 2022 and on 23 June 2022, Moldova was officially granted candidate status by EU leaders.

Fighting corruption has been a major government initiative, one also essential to EU membership. On 8 June 2021, Sandu signed off on the creation of an extra-governmental corruption monitoring body after declaring the state's own institutions "too slow". The six-member panel of the 'Anticorruption Independent Consultative Committee' will be co-chaired by United States diplomat James Wasserstrom, includes economists, jurists and journalists and is partially funded by the European Union and United States. This was followed by the Moldovan government suspending the Prosecutor General Alexandru Stoianoglo in relation to charges of corruption, former Moldovan Prime Minister Iurie Leanca was charged with abuse of power, the former President Igor Dodon was arrested by the Moldovan authorities on charges of corruption for the receipt of bribes.

Russia's invasion of Ukraine caused significant economic turmoil in Moldova throughout 2022, in particular due to its reliance at that time on Russian oil and gas, with annual inflation surging to 22% and growth falling from a post-COVID surge of 14% to 0.3%. In response to these shockwaves, the European Bank for Reconstruction and Development (EBRD) put a total of €2bn (£1.74bn) into the Moldovan economy and helped it secure gas supplies, a fivefold increase over 2021. As of 18 June 2023, Moldovan Prime Minister Dorin Recean confirmed that the country is 100% independent of Russian oil and natural gas. He stated that "Moldova no longer consumes Russian gas, it is integrated in the European energy network both technically and commercially."

On 19 June 2023 the pro-Russian Șor Party was banned by the Constitutional Court of Moldova after months of pro-Russian protests seeking to destabilise the Moldovan government. The court declared the party unconstitutional, with court chairman Nicolae Roșca citing "an article in the constitution stating that parties must through their activities uphold political pluralism, the rule of law and the territorial integrity of Moldova." The party was led by Ilan Shor, a fugitive businessman who fled to Israel in 2019 after being convicted of fraud and money-laundering and sentenced to 15 years in prison in absentia. President Sandu welcomed the court's decision. On 26 June, Ilan Shor announced that he would create a new political party in order to contest the upcoming general election. On 31 July, the Moldovan parliament voted in favour of banning the leaders of the dissolved pro-Russian Șor Party – including Ilan Shor – from standing in elections for a period of five years. Leader and founder of the party, Ilan Shor, currently a fugitive of the state, has claimed he will contest the ban. In August 2023, the Chance party became led by former journalist Alexei Lungu, affiliating with Ilan Shor, however Chance was deregistered only days before the local elections after the director of the Security and Intelligence Service (SIS) stated the party was corrupting voters and using illegal funds from Russia.

Moldovas's pro-Western and pro-Russian factions became increasingly divided following Russia's invasion of Ukraine on 24 February 2022. Moldova's application for European Union membership was submitted on 3 March 2022. President Sandu championed the 2024 European Union membership constitutional referendum which was passed by a narrow margin amid widespread interference by the Russian government. In the November 2024 presidential election, President Maia Sandu was re-elected with 55% of the vote in the run-off.

==== Russia-related events since the invasion of neighbouring Ukraine ====
In February 2022 Sandu condemned the Russian invasion of Ukraine, calling it "a blatant breach of international law and of Ukrainian sovereignty and territorial integrity."

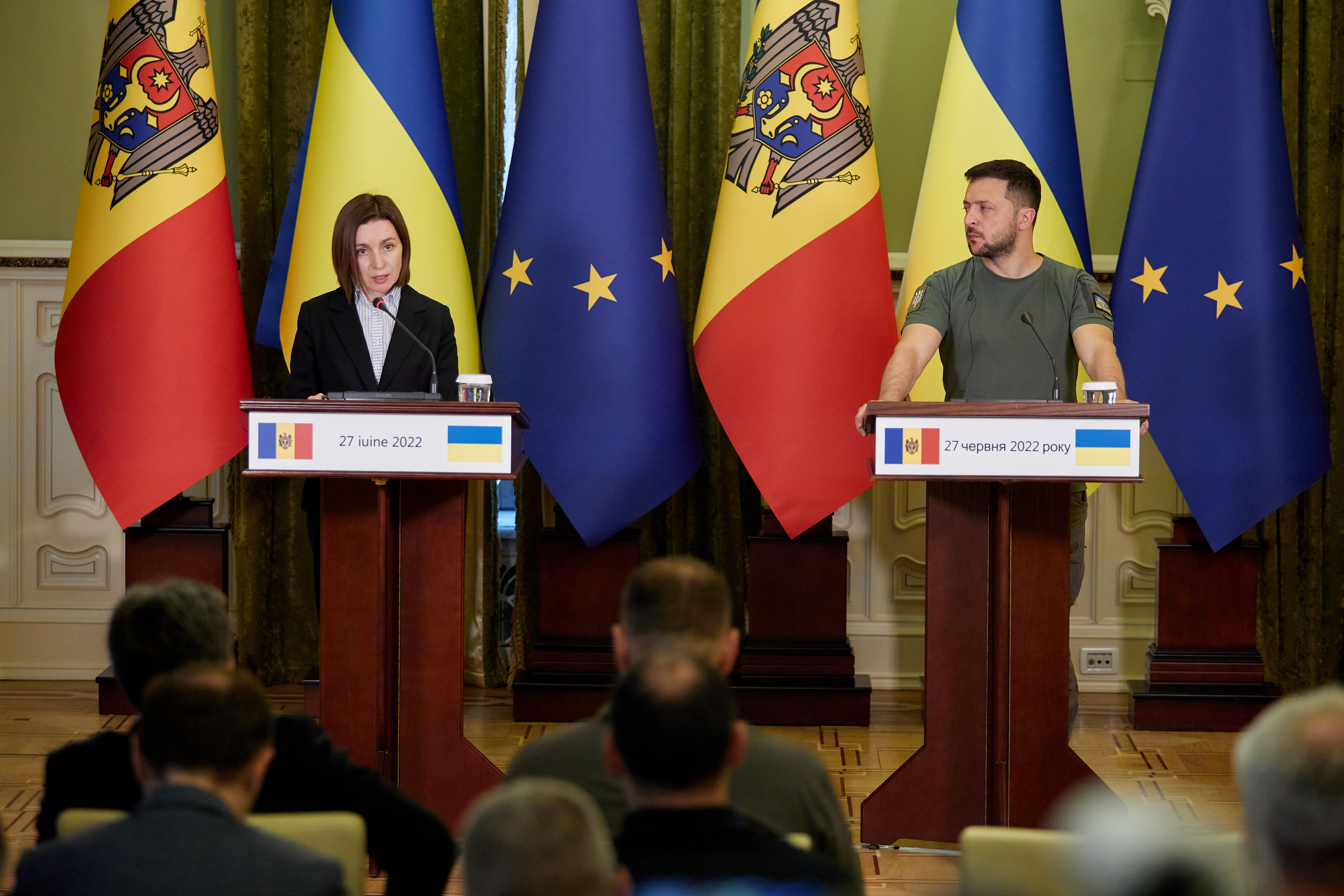
President of Moldova, Maia Sandu, with President of Ukraine, Volodymyr Zelenskyy in Kyiv, 27 June 2022.

Prime Minister Natalia Gavrilita stated on 28 February 2022 that Moldova should rapidly move to become a member of the European Union despite Russian objections.

According to Bloomberg, as the Russian invasion of Ukraine took place, the Moldovan government's computer systems used for security operations along the Ukraine border came under attack from Russia. "As the war progressed, pro-Russian social media accounts spread false claims designed to discredit the Moldovan government, and trolls bombarded Moldovan authorities with thousands of fake bomb threats. In August, hackers breached email servers used by the Moldovan president's office; in November, hackers also published thousands of private messages they claimed to have stolen from Ana Revenco, Moldova's minister of internal affairs, and Sergiu Litvinenco, who was then serving as minister of justice." A sustained campaign of cyberwarfare from Russia against Moldova has continued with the war, with "denial-of-service attempts to flood Moldovan government websites with traffic and force them offline. There's also been a sustained campaign of phishing emails targeting government accounts, with more than 1,300 received in early 2023."

According to the UNHCR, since 24 February 2022, more than 780,000 Ukrainian refugees were permitted to cross the border into Moldova. Of that number, some 107,000 chose to remain in Moldova, the rest seeking asylum further afield.

The country has received praise from the United Nations for its efforts to protect Ukrainian refugees, despite being among the poorest nations in Europe. About 75% of the Ukrainian refugees in Moldova have been hosted by ordinary Moldovan families, sharing their homes with their new guests.

The government's own efforts have been aided by Moldovans for Peace, an NGO civic initiative to provide help to Ukrainian refugees. The World Health Organization has stated that "The Republic of Moldova's authorities and humanitarian entities have demonstrated leadership in responding to the needs of refugees fleeing the war in Ukraine."

On 26 April 2022, authorities from the Transnistria region said two transmitting antennas broadcasting Russian radio programs at Grigoriopol transmitter broadcasting facility near the town of Maiac in the Grigoriopol District near the Ukrainian border had been blown up and the previous evening, the premises of the Transnistrian state security service had been attacked.

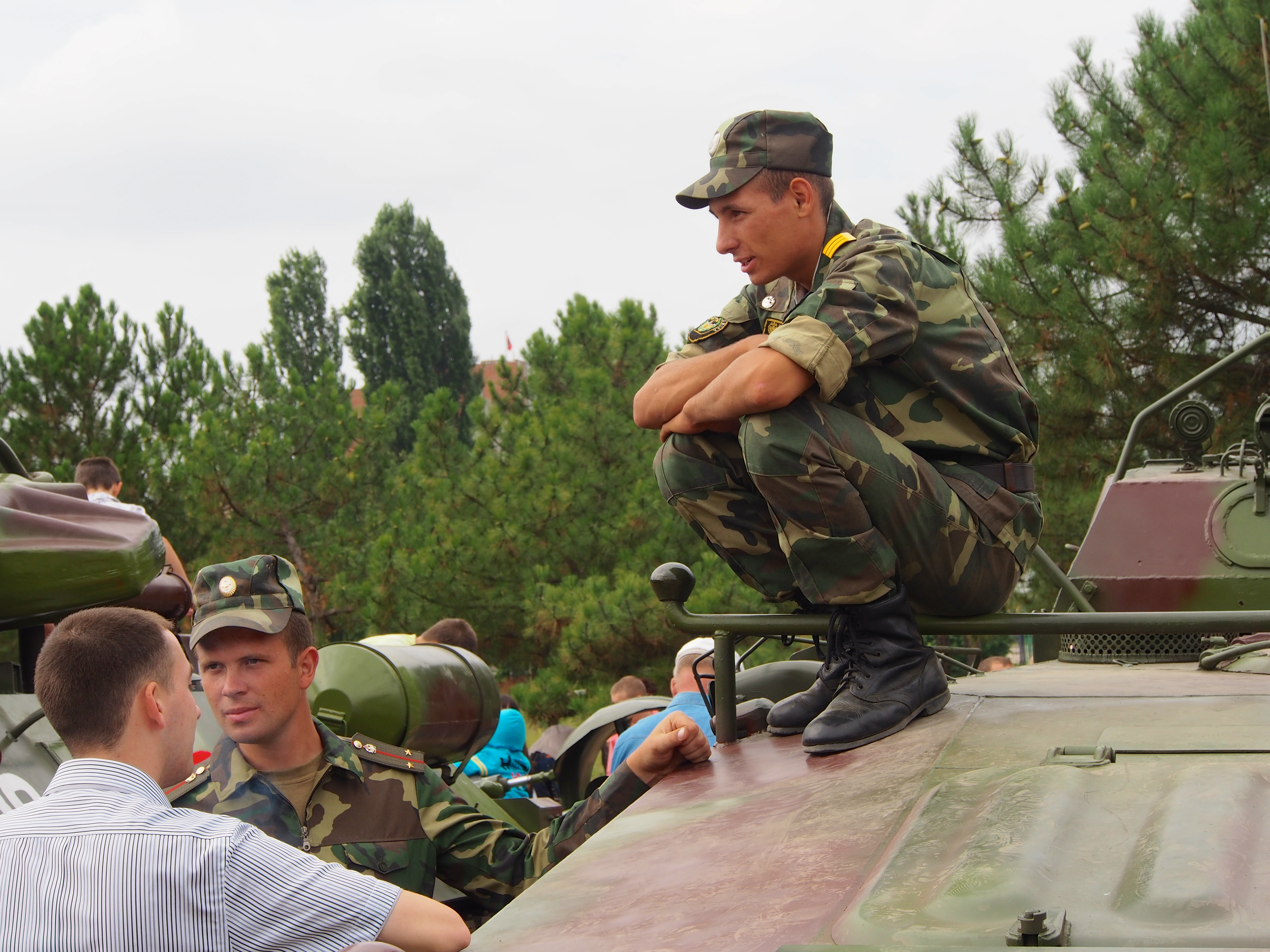
Russian soldiers in Tiraspol, Transnistria.

The Russian army has a military base and a large ammunition dump in the region. Russia has about 1,500 soldiers stationed in breakaway Transnistria. They are supposed to serve there as peacekeepers. In March 2022, the Parliamentary Assembly of the Council of Europe recognized Transnistria as "a Moldovan territory occupied by Russia." On 24 February, the Russian Foreign Ministry claimed that an attack "on Transnistria would be "an attack on the Russian Federation." According to The Kyiv Independent, "There is speculation that this is a facade for a Russian plan to invade or destabilize Moldova." President Sandu dismissed that Moldova intended to invade Transnistria and called for calm.

The Moldovan government expressed its alarm and concern in April 2023 when Russian soldiers stationed in Transnistria undertook military manoeuvres without seeking Chișinău's consent. The Security Zone is managed by the Joint Control Commission (JCC) which consists of representatives from Moldova, Russia, and the separatist regime in Tiraspol. "Between February and April, Russian armoured military equipment moved outside the range of the Joint Peacekeeping Forces. The manoeuvre was not coordinated with the Unified Control Commission." On 8 May, Transnistria's envoy to Moscow, Leonid Manakov, publicly requested that Russia should send more Russian soldiers into Transnistria because of what it called "growing security risks" from Ukraine and Moldova. Manakov also stated that "As long as Russia's peacekeeping mission continues, Moldova is constrained in any military plans and preparations against Trandsniestria". Moldova's prime minister, Dorin Recean, said that Russian troops should be expelled from the region.

On 31 October 2022, Moldova's Interior Ministry said that debris from a Russian missile landed in the northern village of Naslavcea after a Russian fusillade was intercepted by air defenses in neighboring Ukraine. The Ministry reported no people were hurt but the windows of several residential homes were shattered. The Russian strike was targeting a Ukrainian dam on the Nistru river that runs through Moldova and Ukraine. On 5 December, another missile fell near the city of Briceni as Russia launched another wave of missile strikes against Ukraine. Yet another missile fell into Larga on 14 January 2023 as a result of another wave of missile strikes against Ukraine and again on the same village on 16 February of the same year. On 25 September, a missile crashed into Chițcani, for the first time in Moldovan territory controlled by Transnistria. On 11 February 2024, fragments of a Russian drone were found in the village of Etulia. This happened again on 17 February in Etulia Nouă and on 4 April again in Etulia.

Russia's '10 year plan', written in 2021, was leaked to the international press, involved supporting pro-Russian groups, utilizing the Orthodox Church and threatening to cut off supplies of natural gas with the aim to destabilise Moldova.

In February 2023 an attempted coup by a series of Russian-backed actors was uncovered involving saboteurs with military training dressed in civilian clothes to stage attacks (including on state buildings), and take hostages. The Moldovan government was to be overthrown and replaced with a puppet government. The plan allegedly involved an alliance between criminal groups and two exiled Moldovan oligarchs. President Sandu said Russian, Montenegrin, Belarusian, and Serbian citizens were to enter Moldova to incite protests as part of the coup plan; Moldovan intelligence believes foreign provocateurs would be used to foment violent unrest during the anti-government protests. Foreign citizens were also to be involved in violent actions. Sandu credited Ukrainian partners for uncovering locations and logistical aspects of the plot. In a 10 March briefing, United States National Security Council Coordinator for Strategic Communications John Kirby made public information about Russian efforts to destabilise Moldova obtained by the U.S. Kirby stated the U.S. government believes Russia to be pursuing destabilisation efforts in Moldova with the ultimate goal of replacing the existing Moldovan government with one that would be more friendly to Russian interests.

In July 2023, opposition politician Oleg Khorzhan, a pro-Russian critic of the Transnistrian government, and leader of the local Transnistrian Communist Party in the breakaway Transnistria region, was found dead in his home on the outskirts of Tiraspol. The Moldovan National Police has opened an active investigation into his presumed murder.

== See also ==
- History of Europe
- History of Romania
- History of Ukraine
- List of presidents of Moldova
- List of prime ministers of Moldova
- Politics of Moldova
