= Vakarchuk =

Ukrainian-language surname

Vakarchuk (Ukrainian: Вакарчук) is a surname of Ukrainian origin meaning "cowherder". Notable people with the surname include:

- Ivan Vakarchuk (1947–2020), Ukrainian physicist, politician, and social activist
- Svyatoslav Vakarchuk (born 1975), Ukrainian musician, politician, and public activist
