= Okean Elzy: Stormwatch =

- Starring: Sviatoslav Vakarchuk; Denys Hlinin; Miloš Jelić; Denys Dudko; Dmytro Shurov; Pavlo Hudimov; Yurii Khustochka
- Music by: Mykhailo Klymenko
- Production companies: KNIFE! Films; SWEET.TV Originals
- Distributed by: Kinomania
- Release date: 6 November 2025 (Ukraine)
- Running time: 125 minutes
- Country: Ukraine
- Language: Ukrainian
- Box office: 4 million hryvnias ($94,706, first weekend)

Okean Elzy: Stormwatch (Ukrainian: Океан Ельзи: Спостереження Шторму) is a 2025 Ukrainian biographical documentary film about the Ukrainian rock band Okean Elzy. The film is about the history of the band from 1994. Directed by Artem Hryhorian, produced by Maksym Serdiuk and KNIFE! Films. The film uses archived footage, interviews with current members and past members, and with people that impacted the band.

It premiered in Ukraine on 6 November 2025, and on the first weekend after release, it grossed 4 million hryvnias (nearly 100,000 dollars).

== Synopsis ==
The biographical documentary film is dedicated to the history of the band Okean Elzy, which became one of the most popular Ukrainian musical groups during the period of independence. The film covers the band's journey from the early stages of their activity to performing at large stadium concerts.
