= Marcela Nistor =

Moldovan politician

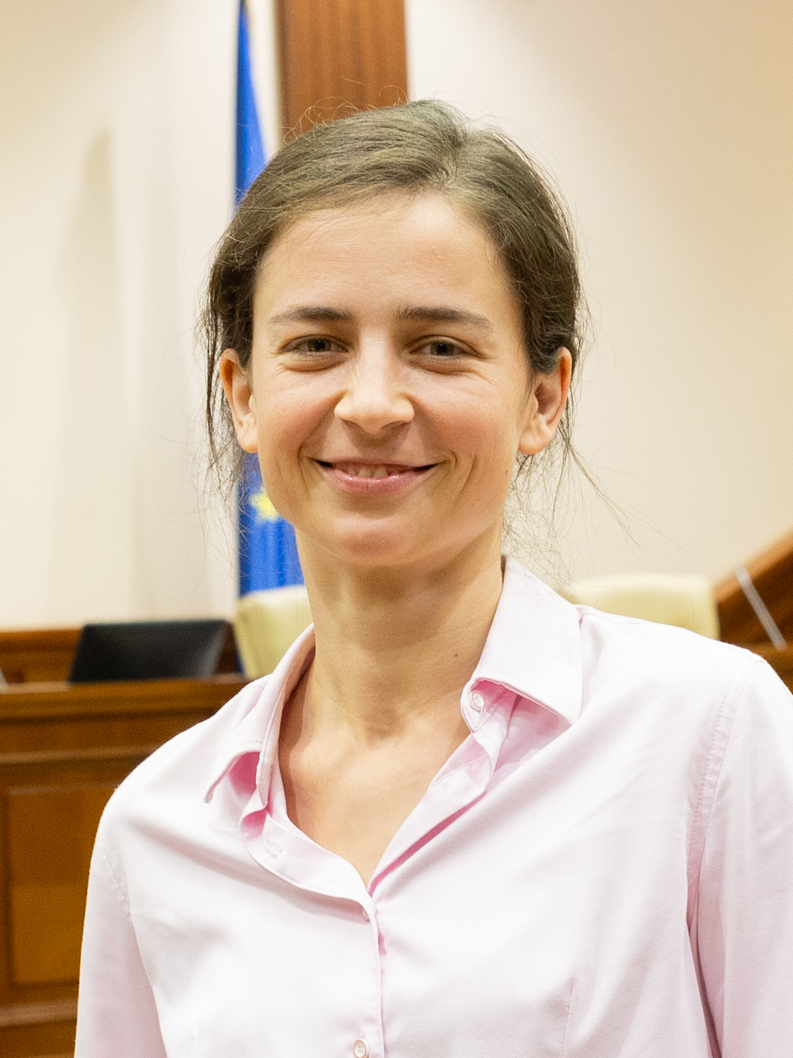
- Nistor in 2024

Secretary of State of the Ministry of Culture
- Incumbent
- Assumed office 15 January 2026
- President: Maia Sandu
- Prime Minister: Alexandru Munteanu; Eugen Osmochescu (acting); Vasile Tofan
- Minister: Cristian Jardan; Dan Suruceanu

Member of the Moldovan Parliament
- In office 23 July 2021 – 16 October 2025
- Parliamentary group: Party of Action and Solidarity

Personal details
- Born: 19 February 1994 (age 32) Bulboaca, Moldova

Marcela Nistor (born 19 February 1994) is a Moldovan actress and politician. She served as a member of the Moldovan Parliament from 2021 to 2025.
