= Ion Suruceanu =

Moldovan singer (born 1949)

Ion Suruceanu OR
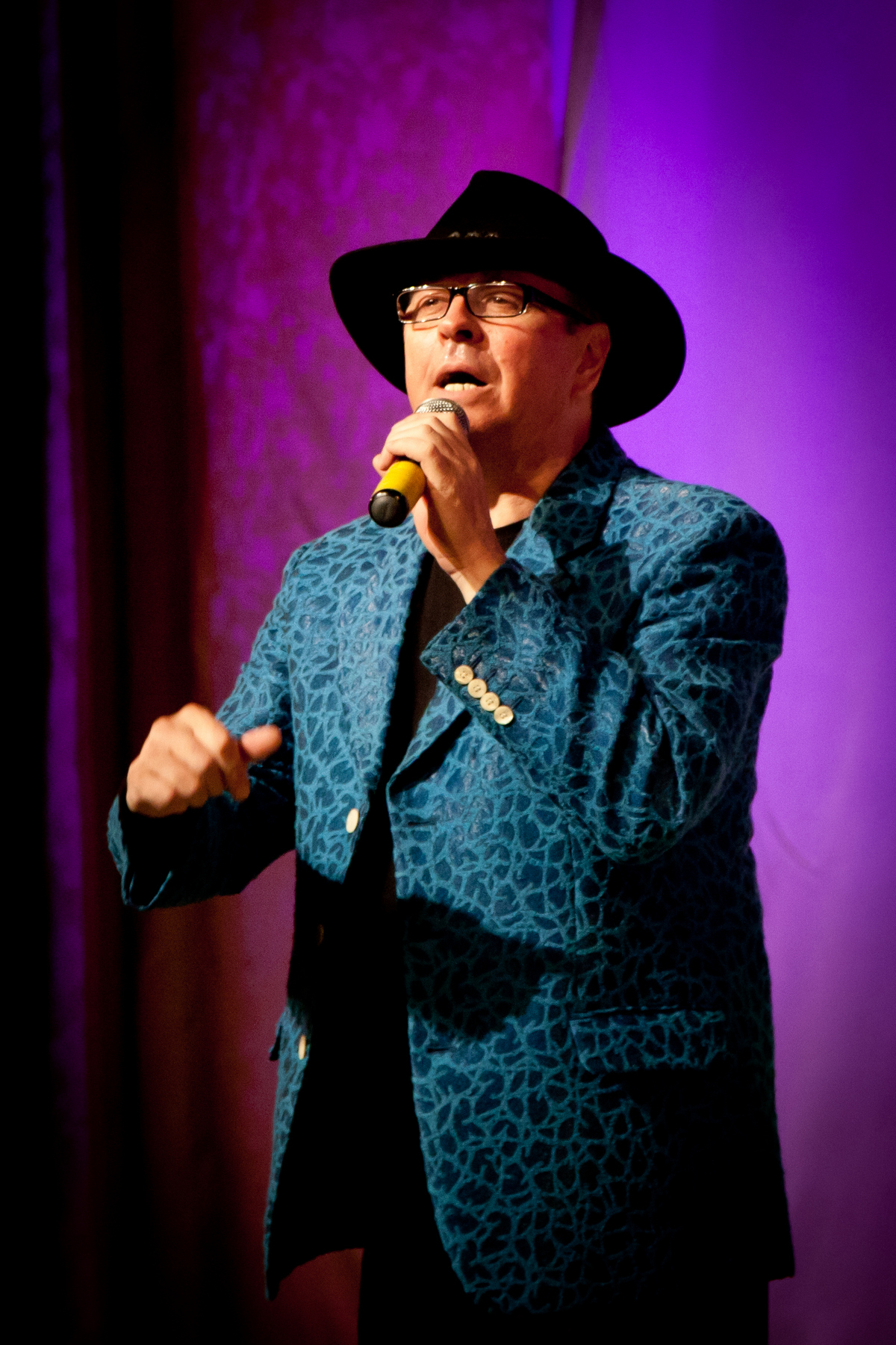
- Suruceanu in 2013
- Born: September 9, 1949 (age 77); Suruceni, Moldavian SSR, Soviet Union
- Citizenship: Moldova; Romania
- Occupations: singer, parliamentarian
- Years active: 1968-present
- Notable work: I have but one song
- Title: People's Deputy
- Term: 1994–1998
- Political party: CPSU; PCRM
- Relatives: Dan Suruceanu (nephew)
- Awards: People's Artist of Moldavian SSR (1990)

Member of the Parliament of Moldova
- In office 1994–1998
- Parliamentary group: Democratic Agrarian Party of Moldova

Ion Suruceanu (born 9 September 1949) is a Moldovan singer and former parliamentarian. In 1990 he was awarded the People's Artist award of Moldavian SSR.

== Brief background ==
Ion Suruceanu was born in the village of Suruceni, Ialoveni District, of Moldova.

He started his singing career in 1968 as a solo singer in the ensemble "Noroc" where he sang until 1970. In 1978–79 Suruceanu sang for the ensemble "Bucuria". In 1981, he finished the Chişinău Music school where he learned to play bassoon and piano.

From the mid 80s Suruceanu became one of Moldova's most famous singers whose fame spread outside the republic. He also performed Russian language songs such as "Nezabudka" (Forget-me-not) which Suruceanu sang at the final of Song of the Year festival in 1989. During this period 1986–1993, he was also performing with the group "Real". Since 1982, his constant composer was Ian Raiburg.

From 1994 to 1998, Suruceanu was a parliamentarian in the Moldovan parliament where he was a deputy chairman of the committee for culture, science, education, and media. Suruceanu was the only PDAM MP who voted that the official language of Moldova to be "Romanian" instead of "Moldovan." He lives in Chişinău. Suruceanu supports the unification of Moldova and Romania.

In November 2023, he has been diagnosed with pneumonia, his health condition got worse and he was transferred to a hospital in Germany.

== Works ==
=== Song performance ===
Vinyl

- În Moldova mea frumoasă (composer A. Luxemburg — Text G. Miron)
- Băieţii veseli (composer A. Luxemburg — Text S.Ghimpu)
- Un singur cantec stiu (I have but one song, 1986)
- Soarele cel mare (Big sun, 1987)

Compact discs

- Ninge floarea de tei (2002)
- Twenty years later: songs of Ian Rainburg (2003)
- Roze, roze (2004)

Others

- "Nezabudka"
- O melodie de amor
- Septembrie
- Guleai, guleai
- Nostalgia
- Adriatica
- Un, doi, trei
- Odinocestvo
- Fetele-cochetele
- Luna, luna
- Drumurile noastre
- Ce seară minunată

Films

- Dnestrovskiye melodiy
