= Flowers of Minefields =

Single by Okean Elzy
- Language: Ukrainian
- Released: July 27, 2022
- Genre: Rock

Flowers of Minefields (Ukrainian: «Квіти мінних зон», romanized: Kvity minnyh zon) is a single by Ukrainian rock band Okean Elzy, published in July 2022. According to the band members, the song was written a few years ago and was to be included in a new album, which was to be released in April 2022.

== Video ==
According to the idea of director Oleg Tomin, the video clip "Flowers of Mine Zones" depicts as it were two different dimensions - a relatively calm life in the rear and active combat operations on the fronts of the war for the Freedom and Independence of Ukraine. However, the most important thing is the intersection of these worlds, from which the common reality of all Ukrainians is formed. When there is an awareness of actual needs and requirements. When war is at arm's length, the rear is at arm's length.
