= Supersymetriya =

Суперсиметрія

Studio album by Okean Elzy
- Released: 2003
- Genre: Rock
- Label: United Music Group
- Producer: Vitaliy Telezin, Sergei Tovstoluzhsky

Okean Elzy chronology
Model (2001)	Суперсиметрія (2003)	GLORIA (2005)

Supersymetriya (Ukrainian: Суперсиметрія) is a studio album by the Ukrainian alternative rock band Okean Elzy released in 2003.

Okean Elzy's frontman Svyatoslav Vakarchuk has a Ph.D. in the field of supersymmetry.

== Track listing ==
1. Кішка
2. Дівчина (З Іншого Життя)
3. Вільний
4. Susy.
5. Мене
6. Для Тебе
7. Леді
8. Майже Весна
9. Холодно
10. Віддам
11. Невидима Сім'я
