= Merry, brother, times have come... =

2006 single by Okean Elzy

"Merry, brother, times have come..." (Ukrainian: «Веселі, брате, часи настали...», romanized: Veseli, brate, chasy nastaly...) is a single by the lead singer of Ukrainian rock group Okean Elzy's Svyatoslav Vakarchuk, released on October 14, 2006.

The premiere of the video clip for the title song of the single took place on October 15, 2006, in the analytical program “TSN. Results of the week" on the 1+1 TV channel. The video was directed by Viktor Pryduvalov.

The song became widely known due to its pessimistic lyrics, which were perceived by many as Vakarchuk's disappointment in the Orange Revolution.

All money received from the sale of the single was transferred to a regional specialized children's home in the city of Makiivka, Donetsk Oblast.

== Musicians ==
- Svyatoslav Vakarchuk - vocals
- Petro Cherniavsky - guitar
- Denis Dudko - bass guitar
- Milos Jelich - keyboards
- Denis Glinin - drums
- Volodymyr Voit - bandura
