= Tam, de nas nema =

Там, де нас нема Tam, de nas nema

Studio album by Okean Elzy
- Released: 1998
- Recorded: 1998
- Genre: Rock
- Length: 1:00:35
- Label: Lavina Music
- Producer: Arkady Viktororiev (track 9), Vitaliy Klimov, Dmitro Ivaney, Okean Elzy

Okean Elzy chronology
Там, де нас нема Tam, de nas nema (1998)	Yananebibuv (2000)

"Tam, de nas nema" (Ukrainian: Там, де нас нема, lit. 'Wherever We Aren't') is the debut studio album of the popular Ukrainian rock group Okean Elzy. Svyatoslav Vakarchuk is the lead vocalist and main lyricist on this record. It was released in 1998 by the Kyiv-based record label Lavina Music.

== Meaning ==
The term "Tam de nas nema" is a reference to a Ukrainian proverb: Ukrainian: Добре там, де нас нема. Translation – It's good where we aren't. In English, a similar proverb is, "The grass is always greener on the other side."

== Track listing ==
- All lyrics by Sviatoslav Vakarchuk. Music by Okean Elzy.
1. Novyi den (2:48) - (Ukrainian: Новий день; Translation: New Day)
2. Tam, de nas nema (3:29) - (Там, де нас нема; There, Where We Are Not)
3. Holos tviy (3:54) - (Голос твій; Your voice)
4. Pozych meni sontse (4:06) - (Позич мені сонце; Lend Me the Sun)
5. Taj-Mahal (3:22) - (Тадж-Махал)
6. Sumna melodiya (4:17) - (Сумна мелодія; Sad Melody)
7. Poyizd «Chuzha Liubov» (3:59) - (Поїзд "Чужа любов"; Train "Others' Love")
8. Ydu na dno (3:34) - (Йду на дно; Going to the Bottom)
9. Visim (3:30) - (Вісім, Eight)
10. Lastivka z moho mista (3:04) - (Ластівка з мого міста; A Swallow from my City)
11. Ty zabula davno (4:38) - (Ти забула давно; You Forgot Long Ago)
12. Long Time Ago (3:47)
13. Kolyska vitru (3:05) - (Колиска вітру; Cradle of the Wind)
14. Hodi vzhe (4:29) - (Годі вже; Enough Already)
15. Tam, de nas nema (remix) (4:07)

== Personnel ==
=== Okean Elzy ===
- Sviatoslav Vakarchuk: Vocals
- Pavlo Hudimov: Guitars
- Yuriy Khustochka: Bass
- Denys Hlinin: Drums

=== Additional personnel ===
- Roman Surzha: Keyboards (tracks 3, 5-7 and 12)
- Edik Kosca: Tambourine (track 2)
