= Ministry of Culture (Moldova) =

Government ministry of Moldova

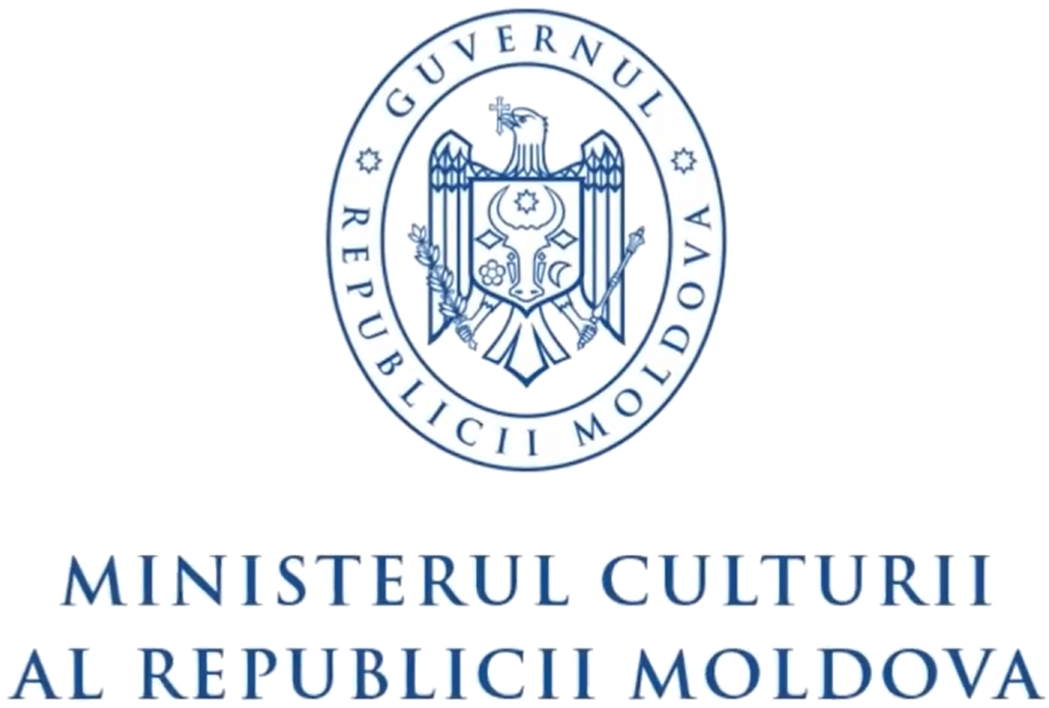

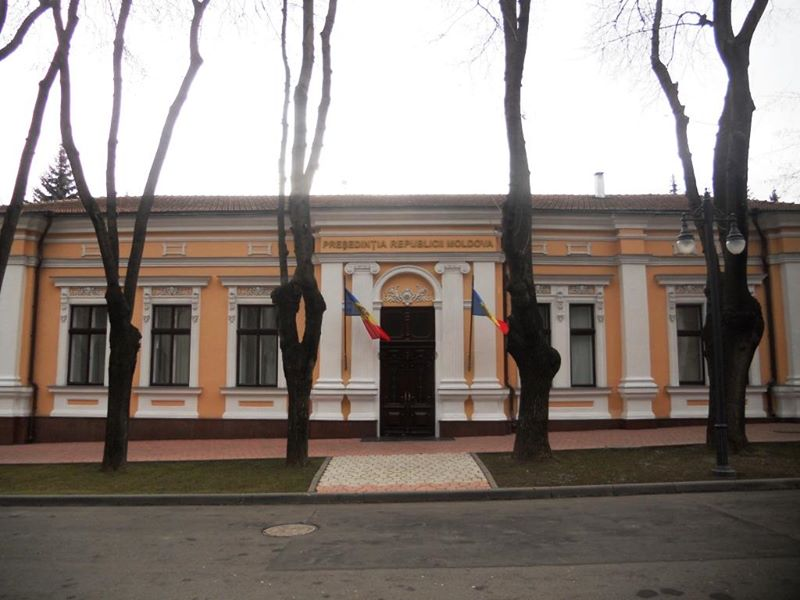
- Headquarters in Chișinău

Ministry overview
- Formed: 6 June 1990; 36 years ago (as Ministry of Culture and Cults)
- Preceding agencies: Ministry of Education, Culture and Research; Ministry of Culture and Tourism; Ministry of Culture and Cults
- Jurisdiction: Government of Moldova
- Headquarters: 24 Nicolae Iorga Street, Chișinău
- Minister responsible: Dan Suruceanu, Minister of Culture
- Ministry executives: Ana Varzari, Secretary General; Marcela Nistor, Secretary of State; Corneliu Cirimpei, Secretary of State
- Website: mc.gov.md

The Ministry of Culture (Romanian: Ministerul Culturii) is one of the fourteen ministries of the Government of Moldova. The current minister is Dan Suruceanu. He has raised complaints due to the neglectance of culture in the Moldovan Government and the low salaries that the workers of the Ministry of Culture receive, specifying that in 2022 they would increase.

== List of ministers ==
No.	Portrait	Name (Birth–Death)	Office term		Cabinet
1		Ion Ungureanu (1935–2017)	6 June 1990	5 April 1994	Druc Muravschi Sangheli I
2		Mihail Cibotaru (1934–2021)	5 April 1994	24 January 1997	Sangheli II
3		Ghenadie Ciobanu (born 1957)	24 January 1997	19 April 2001	Ciubuc I-II Sturza Braghiș
4		Ion Păcuraru (born 1952)	19 April 2001	23 December 2002	Tarlev I
5		Veaceslav Madan (1948–2026)	23 December 2002	19 April 2005	Tarlev I
6		Artur Cozma (born 1967)	19 April 2005	1 December 2008	Tarlev II Greceanîi I
7		Mihail Barbulat (born 1971)	10 June 2009	25 September 2009	Greceanîi II
8		Boris Focșa (born 1968)	25 September 2009	30 May 2013	Filat I-II
9		Monica Babuc (born 1964)	30 May 2013	26 July 2017	Leancă Gaburici Streleț Filip
10		Sergiu Prodan (born 1963)	6 August 2021	1 November 2025	Gavrilița Recean
11		Cristian Jardan (born 1983)	1 November 2025	22 July 2026	Munteanu
12		Dan Suruceanu (born 1968)	22 July 2026	Incumbent	Tofan
