= City of Mary (song) =

2022 single by Okean Elzy

Single by Okean Elzy
- Released: 22 April 2022
- Recorded: 21 April 2022
- Length: 4:20
- Label: TOB
- Songwriter: Sviatoslav Vakarchuk

Okean Elzy singles chronology
"Весна" (2022)	"City of Mary" (2022)

Music video
- "Місто Марії" on YouTube

"City of Mary", also known as "Misto Marii" (Ukrainian: Місто Марії, pronounced [ˈmisto mɐˈr⁽ʲ⁾iji]), is a 2022 single by Ukrainian band Okean Elzy. The song was released on 22 April 2022 as a music video, and released on 10 May 2022 on streaming platforms.

== Background ==
According to band frontman Sviatoslav Vakarchuk, a military friend of Vakarchuk, who was fighting in the Siege of Mariupol, requested that the band should make a song that paid tribute to the Ukrainian fighters defending the city. Vakarchuk accepted, saying "it tears me from the inside every day when I read the news about Mariupol."

== Composition ==
The song is dedicated to the Ukrainian fighters of the Siege of Mariupol. The band sings about how Mariupol will stand against Russian attacks, no matter how fierce they are. The song also features excerpts from Ukrainian patriotic song "Oi u luzi chervona kalyna".
