= Odyn v kanoe =

Ukrainian indie music band

Odyn v kanoe Один в каное
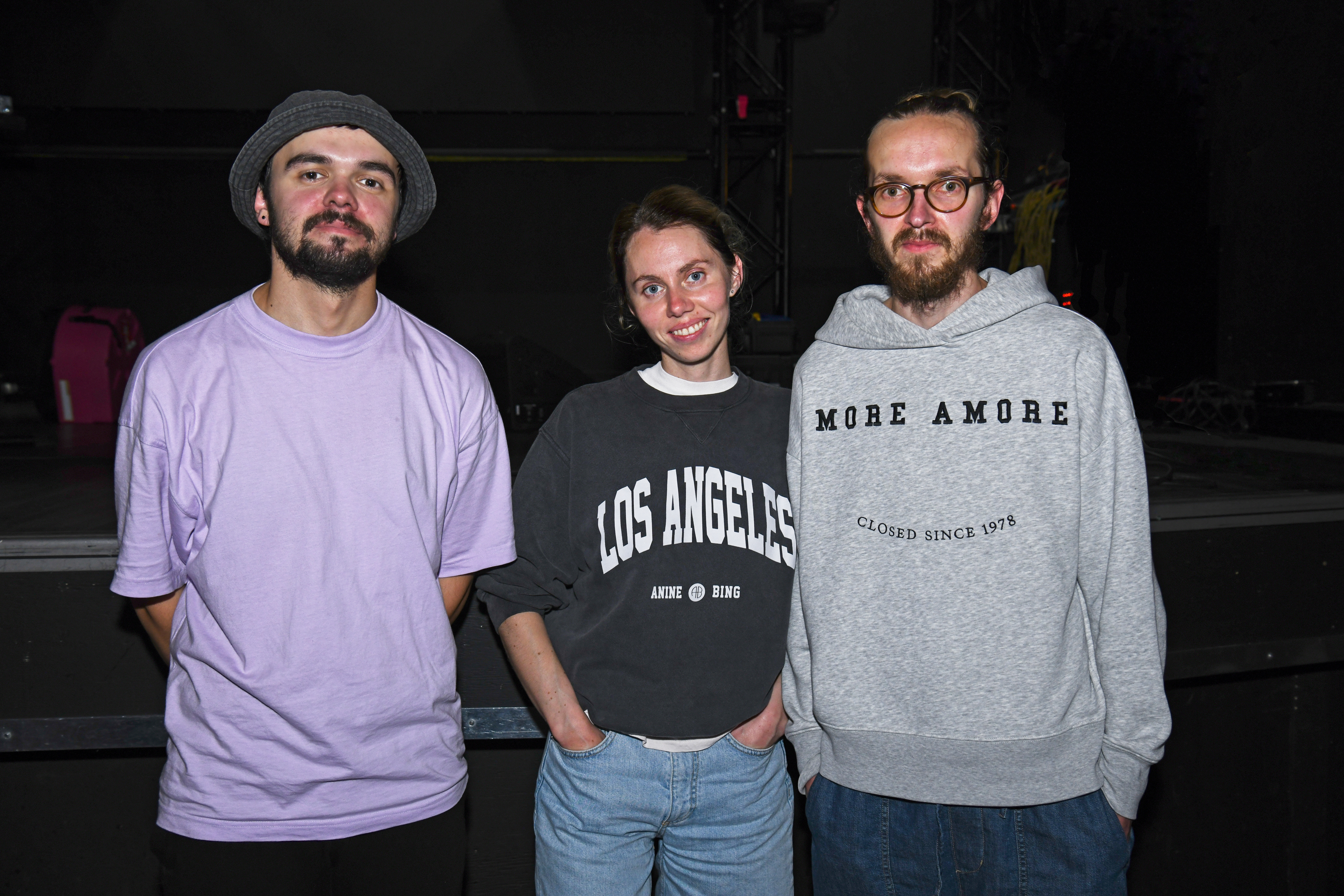
- Odyn v kanoe after a concert in Toronto, 2022

Background information
- Origin: Lviv, Ukraine
- Genres: Indie, indie rock, experimental rock, acoustic music
- Years active: 2010–present
- Members: Iryna Shvaidak; Ustym Pokhmurskyi; Ihor Dzikovskyi
- Website: odynvkanoe.com

Odyn v kanoe (Ukrainian: Один в каное, lit. 'Alone in a Canoe') is a Ukrainian indie music band founded in 2010 in Lviv. The band consists of vocalist Iryna Shvaidak, guitarist Ustym Pokhmurskyi, and percussionist Ihor Dziykovskyi. The band's discography includes two self-titled albums, released in 2016 and 2021. The debut album was released in 2016. And two singles — "Ikony (Shistdesyatnykam)" (Ukrainian: Ікони (Шістдесятникам), lit. '"Icons (To the Sixtiers)"') and "U mene nemaye domu" (Ukrainian: У мене немає дому, lit. '"I have no home"'), for which the band's debut music video was filmed.

The main feature of "Odyn v kanoe" is how they mix different musical styles, creating their own unique style. In their compositions, you can feel notes of folk, electronics, and even ethno, which makes each track a real musical journey.

== History ==
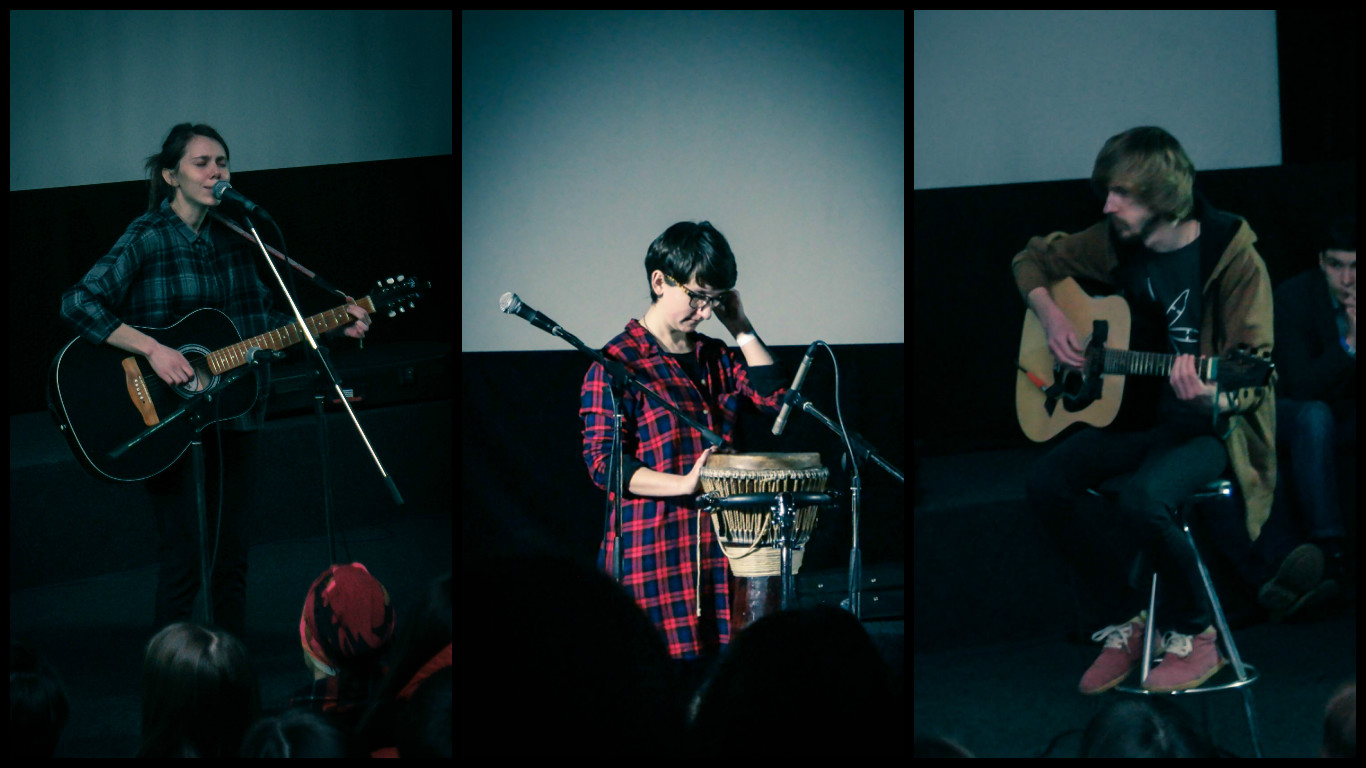
The band during their all-Ukrainian tour in Cherkasy, 2016.

The band "Odyn v kanoe" was founded in 2010 in the western Ukrainian city of Lviv, when the initiator of the band's creation gathered 7–8 people who were previously unknown to each other for joint rehearsals. The band played very different music. There were three vocalists in the new band. At the same time, none of the band members were professional musicians. The band members changed throughout the year, until Iryna Shvaidak and guitarist Ustym Pokhmurskyі decided to split off. Later, Olena Davydenko joined them, and then the first line-up of the band "Odyn v kanoe" was formed.

Over time, the band began to actively tour and appear on the stage of various music festivals.

Since 2014 "Odyn v kanoe" refuses to perform in Russia due to the Russia's military aggression against Ukraine.

Despite the popularity gained, until 2015 all members of the band were also engaged in their professional career. "Odyn v kanoe" does not have a producer or a team, all organizational issues are managed by the musicians themselves.

In 2016, the first self-titled studio album was released, which included 25 songs at once. The album was recorded in Dnipro. There was also a nationwide tour of almost all regional centers of Ukraine (except for Crimea, Donetsk and Luhansk). During the tour, the band's line-up changed: percussionist Olena Davydenko was replaced by Ihor Dziykovskyi.

On January 14, 2019, "Odyn v kanoe" released their first video clip in 9 years for the song "I have no home".

On June 6, 2021, the second self-titled album with 12 songs was released, including the singles "Icons" and "I have no home".

In August 2024, "Odyn v kanoe" announced that they would be giving concerts in numerous European cities in autumn 2024, including Prague, Warsaw, Hamburg, Amsterdam, Brussels, Dublin, Zurich and Athens.

In autumn 2024, the band had concerts in numerous European cities, including Prague, Warsaw, Hamburg, Amsterdam, Brussels, Dublin, Zurich and Athens. In 2025, concerts are scheduled to take place in many European cities from March to April, starting from Berlin on March 9 via for instance Paris and Madrid until completion in Barcelona on April 7, 2025.

== Origin of the name and logo ==
The name of the band came about by accident. Iryna, reading an online article about Native Americans, came across one of their names — Wikeninnish. Translated into Ukrainian, it sounded like "Odyn v kanoe", which she really liked, and she decided to use it for the name of the band.

The band's logo resembles a six-petalled flower, which is borrowed from the common form of resonator holes of the traditional Ukrainian bandura. At the same time, each petal symbolizes a boat.

== Band members ==
The band currently consists of the following musicians:

- Iryna Shvaidak — vocals;
- Ustym Pokhmurskyi — guitar;
- Ihor Dziykovskyi — percussion.

Former members:

- Olena Davydenko — percussion.

== Discography ==
Studio albums:

- 2016 — Odyn v kanoe
- 2021 — Odyn v kanoe

Singles:

- 2018 — "Icons"
- 2019 — "I have no home"
- 2021 — ″Misto vesny″ (with Okean Elzy) («Місто весни» ″City of Spring″)
- 2023 — ″Odyn v poli voyin″ («Один в полі воїн» ″One-man army″)
