= Veaceslav Madan =

Moldovan actor, film director and politician (1948–2026)

Moldovan Ambassador to Bulgaria, Albania and Macedonia
- In office 7 November 2005 – 30 April 2009
- President: Vladimir Voronin
- Prime Minister: Vasile Tarlev; Zinaida Greceanîi
- Preceded by: Vasile Sturza
- Succeeded by: Lidia Guțu

Minister of Culture
- In office 23 December 2002 – 19 April 2005
- President: Vladimir Voronin
- Prime Minister: Vasile Tarlev
- Preceded by: Ion Păcuraru
- Succeeded by: Artur Cozma (as Minister of Culture and Tourism)

First Deputy Minister of Culture
- In office 14 September 2001 – 23 December 2002
- President: Vladimir Voronin
- Prime Minister: Vasile Tarlev
- Minister: Ion Păcuraru

Personal details
- Born: 27 November 1948 Cojușna, Moldavian SSR, Soviet Union
- Died: 29 September 2026 (aged 77)

Veaceslav Madan (27 November 1948 – 29 September 2026) was a Moldovan actor, film director, politician and diplomat. He served as the Minister of Culture in the Vasile Tarlev Cabinet. Madan died on 29 September 2026, at the age of 77.
