= Iryna Shvaidak =

Ukrainian musician (born 1989)

Iryna Shvaidak Ірина Швайдак
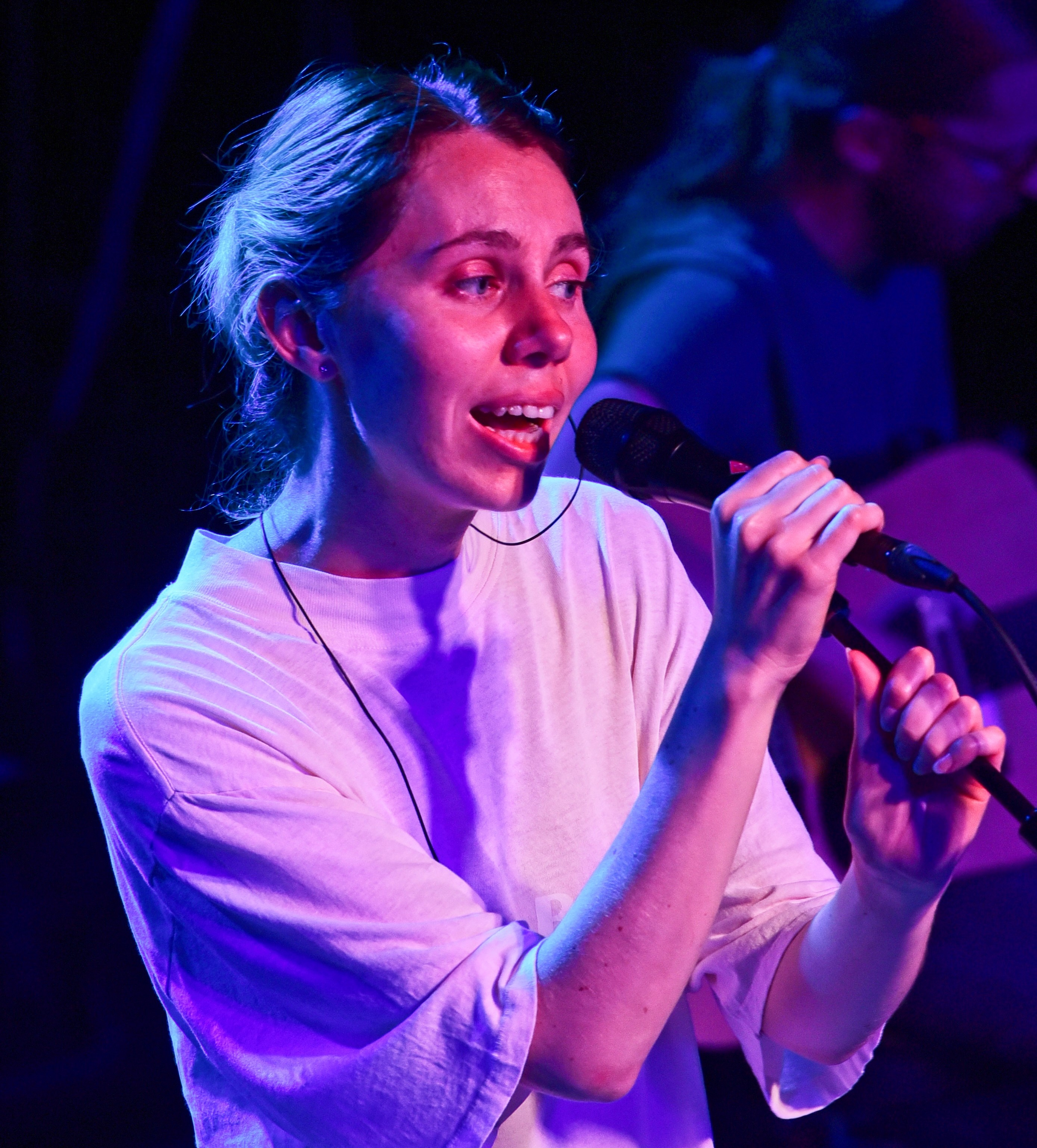
- Shvaidak in Toronto, 2022

Background information
- Born: May 30, 1989 (age 37); Zolochiv, Lviv Oblast, Ukrainian SSR, Soviet Union
- Genres: Indie pop, indie rock

Iryna Volodymyrivna Shvaidak (Ukrainian: Ірина Володимирівна Швайдак; born 30 May 1989) is a Ukrainian musician. She is a singer and songwriter of the Ukrainian indie band Odyn v kanoe.

== Early life ==
Shvaidak graduated from a piano class (taught by S. O. Ulychna) in Zolochiv Music School.

She received her higher education at the Faculty of Philology of Lviv University, majoring in Ukrainian language and literature, where she defended her thesis on the topic: "The Solar World in the Works of Bohdan-Ihor Antonych". In 2011, she became a student of the Master's program of ecumenical sciences at Ukrainian Catholic University.

During university, Shvaidak learned to play the guitar and wrote her first song Nebo (Ukrainian: Небо, lit. 'Sky'). In 2010, Shvaidak with 7 others created the indie band Odyn v kanoe. Her role in the band is songwriter and vocalist. Until 2015, she combined music with professional work and studies, working in a literary studio for young people in Dzherelo training and rehabilitation center.
