= Brătușeni =

- Commune
- Flag Coat of arms

- Location in Moldova
- Coordinates: 48°05′N 27°24′E
- Country: Moldova
- District: Edineț District

Government
- Elevation: 564 ft (172 m)

Population (2014)
  - Total: 4,772
- Time zone: UTC+2 (EET)
  - Summer (DST): UTC+3 (EEST)
- Postal code: MD-4617
- Area code: +373 246

Brătușeni is a commune in Edineț District, Moldova. It is composed of two villages, Brătușeni and Brătușenii Noi.

== Notable people ==
- Anatoliy Kinakh
- Ghenadie Ciobanu
- Ivan Vakarchuk
