= Ion Păcuraru =

Moldovan politician (born 1952)

Minister of Culture
- In office 19 April 2001 – 23 December 2002
- President: Vladimir Voronin
- Prime Minister: Vasile Tarlev
- Preceded by: Ghenadie Ciobanu
- Succeeded by: Veaceslav Madan

First Deputy Minister of Culture
- In office 30 May 1994 – 16 January 1996
- President: Mircea Snegur
- Prime Minister: Andrei Sangheli
- Minister: Mihail Cibotaru

Personal details
- Born: 26 January 1952 (age 74) Vadul lui Isac, Moldavian SSR, Soviet Union

Ion Păcuraru (born 26 January 1952) is a Moldovan composer and former politician. He served as the Minister of Culture of Moldova from 2001 to 2002.
