= Ivan Vakarchuk =

Ukrainian physicist and politician (1947–2020)

Hero of Ukraine Ivan Vakarchuk
- Іван Вакарчук
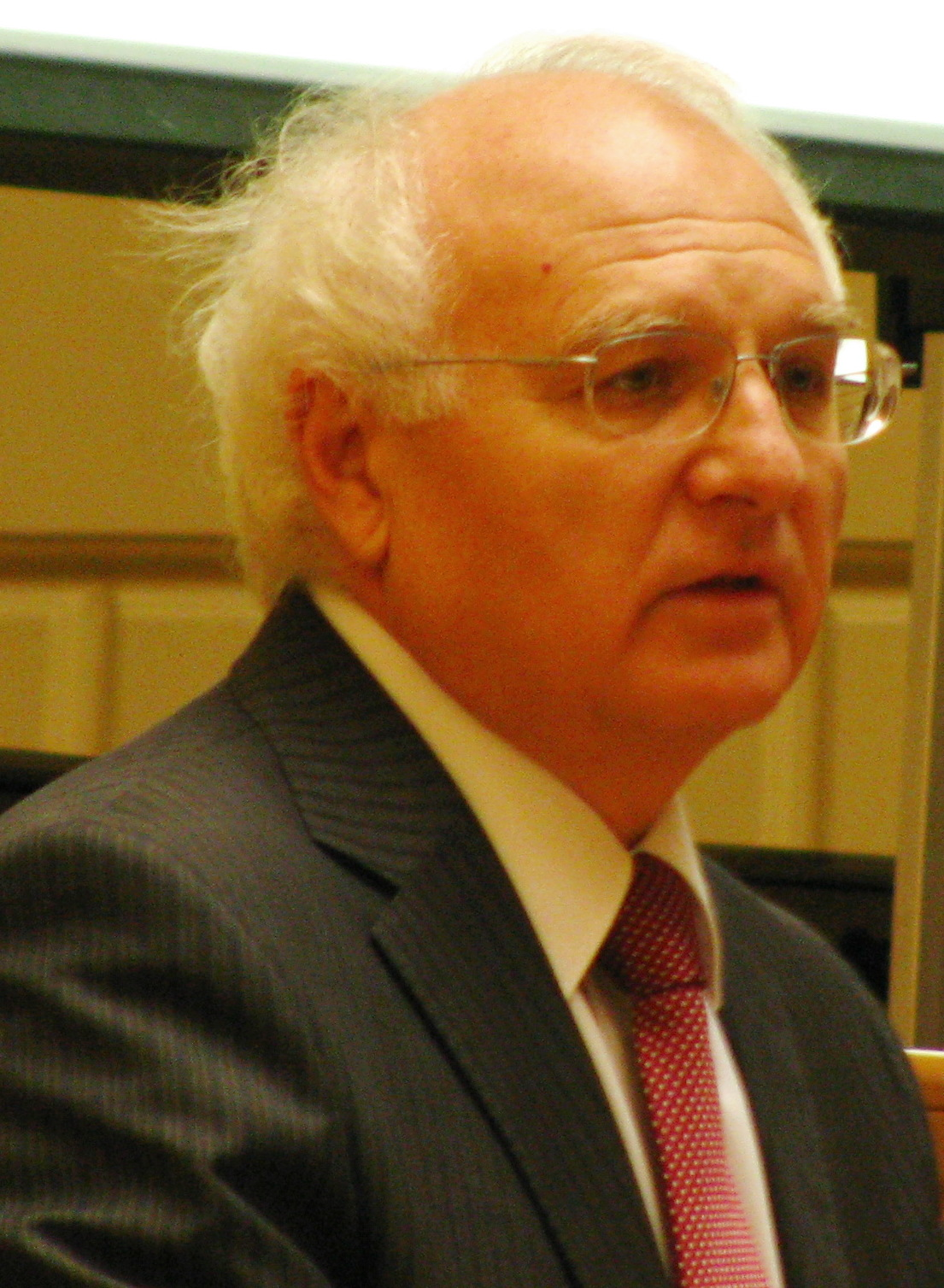
- Vakarchuk in 2010

Minister of Education and Science
- In office 18 December 2007 – 11 March 2010
- President: Viktor Yushchenko
- Prime Minister: Yulia Tymoshenko
- Deputy: Maksym Strikha
- Preceded by: Stanislav Nikolaenko
- Succeeded by: Dmytro Tabachnyk

Rector of the University of Lviv
- In office 11 March 2010 – 6 June 2013
- Preceded by: Vasyl Vysochanskyi
- Succeeded by: Vasyl Vysochanskyi
- In office 13 November 1990 – 18 December 2007
- Preceded by: Volodymyr Chuhainov
- Succeeded by: Vasyl Vysochanskyi

Personal details
- Born: 6 March 1947 Brătușeni, Edineț Raion Moldavian SSR, Soviet Union
- Died: 4 April 2020 (aged 73) Lviv, Ukraine
- Spouse: Svitlana Oleksandrivna Vakarchuk
- Children: Svyatoslav; Oleh
- Education: University of Lviv
- Awards: Hero of Ukraine

Ivan Oleksandrovych Vakarchuk (Ukrainian: Іван Олександрович Вакарчук; 6 March 1947 – 4 April 2020) was a Ukrainian and Soviet physicist, academic leader, and politician, who contributed to science policy and civil society. From 1990 to 2007 and again between 2010 and 2013 he was rector of the Lviv University. In 2007–2010 he was Minister of Education and Science of Ukraine. He received the Hero of Ukraine award on 5 March 2007. He was father of the leader of the rock band Okean Elzy Svyatoslav Vakarchuk.

== Early life ==
Ivan Vakarchuk was born on 6 March 1947 in the village of Brătușeni, Edineț District, Moldavian SSR.

== Education ==
In 1965 Vakarchuk received his secondary education by finishing with honours a local middle school in Brătușeni. In 1965–1970 he studied at the Faculty of Physics at the University of Lviv. From 1970 to 1973 he continued his studies at postgraduate research (aspirantura) of the Lviv section of condensed state statistical theory of the Institute of Theoretical Physics, affiliated with the Ukrainian Academy of Sciences.

In 1974 he defended his candidature thesis "Application of the method of displacements and collective variables in the study of interacting Bose particles near absolute zero", and in 1980 his doctoral thesis "Microscopic theory of Bose liquid". Ivan Vakarchuk represented the Lviv school of statistical physics founded by Ihor Yukhnovskyi, member of the National Academy of Sciences of Ukraine.

== Career ==
From 1973 to 1984 Ivan Vakarchuk worked at the Lviv branch of the Institute for Theoretical Physics affiliated with the Ukrainian Academy of Sciences (now is the Institute of Condensed Matter Physics of National Academy of Sciences) as junior research fellow, senior researcher and head of quantum statistics department.

After 1984, Vakarchuk began performing the duties of Professor, head of department of theoretical physics at the University of Lviv.

=== Rector of Lviv University ===
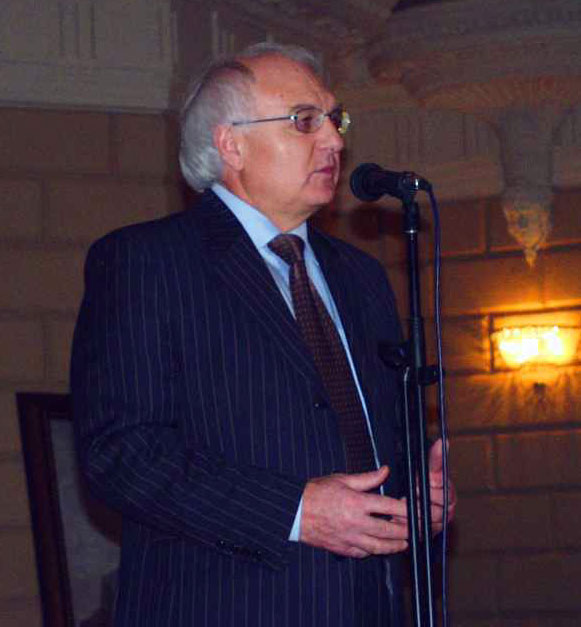
Ivan Vakarchuk speaking at Lviv University in 2006

On 13 November 1990 Ivan Vakarchuk was elected the rector of Lviv University and worked until November 2007. During his tenure as rector Vakarchuk introduced a system of entrance tests for students in order to reduce corruption.

During the 2004' presidential elections, Vakarchuk openly called students to vote for Viktor Yushchenko and supported a students' strike as part of the Orange Revolution. He held the office of rector at Lviv University again between 2010 and 2013.

=== Minister of Education and Science ===
On 18 December 2007 Vakarchuk was appointed the Minister of Education and Science of Ukraine. In 2008 he took the 50th place in the Top 100 of the most influential Ukrainians, according to Reporter magazine.

As minister, Vakarchuk supported the reform of Ukrainian education by promoting civilian control over exams and introducing External independent evaluation (ZNO). This allowed to increase equality in access to education and crack down on corrupt practices. Those applicants who managed to get over 200 points in a ZNO test received a personal call from the minister. Vakarchuk also promoted the creation of new Ukrainian-language school books and supported changes in school programs, eliminating rudiments of the Soviet era, promoting the study of literary works by globally renowned authors and making writings by Gogol part of the Ukrainian literature course.

Under Vakarchuk's tenure, Ukraine's universities received their scientific and financial autonomy, which was later confirmed a by law prepared by the minister and his team. Students got the right to choose their subjects and spend one of their semesters in a different educational establishment. Vakarchuk's ministry also introduced a European-standard addition to diplomas, which confirmed the correspondence of Ukrainian students' educational level to requirements of Bologna Process. Under his leadership, the ministry promoted inclusivity in education.

Vakarchuk's ministry promoted the rise of requirements for the attainment of teaching positions in universities. He was instrumental in the adoption of a program for the development of nanotechnologies by the Ukrainian government. Under his leadership the ministry analyzed the needs of Ukraine's educational establishments in teaching equipment. In 2008 Ukraine's scientists received access to GEANT network.

After Vakarchuk's resignation in 2010 a number of his initiatives were aborted by his successor Dmytro Tabachnyk.

== Scientific achievements ==
Ivan Vakarchuk has the rank of Doctor of Physical and Mathematical Sciences, Professor, PhD with the thesis: "Application of the method of displacements and collective variables in the study of interacting Bose particles near absolute zero" (Institute for Theoretical Physics, Ukrainian Academy of Sciences, 1974) doctoral thesis on "Microscopic theory of Bose liquid" (Institute for Theoretical Physics, Academy of Sciences of the Soviet Union, 1980).

A distinctive feature of professor Ivan Vakarchuk was the breadth of his scientific interests: physics of quantum liquids, theory of phase transitions and critical phenomena, physics of disordered systems, magnetic systems, mathematical methods in theoretical physics, fundamental problems of quantum mechanics and quantum computer sciences, geophysics, general relativity theory, cosmology, philosophy of science. In each of these fields he proposed new original approaches to the study of various physical phenomena and processes.

Ivan Vakarchuk paid particular attention to the latest achievements in science and philosophy of science issues, including the relationship between research methods of natural sciences and humanities, identifying common math mechanisms that "manage" the processes occurring in the humanitarian and social spheres.
He is the author of over 240 scientific papers, and author of the books "Lectures on General Relativity" (1991), "Quantum Mechanics" (1998, 2004, 2007, 2012) "Introduction to the many-body problem" (1999) and "The Theory of Stellar Spectra" (2003).

== Titles and awards ==
=== Activism ===
- Founder and Editor-in-chief of the "Journal of Physics Research" and the popular science magazine "World of Physics"
- Member of the Commission of state awards and heraldry
- Member of the Committee on State Prizes of Ukraine in science and technology
- Vice-President of the Union of rectors of higher educational establishments of Ukraine
- Member of the editorial board of the journal "Higher Education in Ukraine"
- Chairman of the board of the Lviv Regional Peace Council
- President of the Ukrainian Physical Society
- Member of the Council on Science and Science and Technology Policy under the President of Ukraine
- Member of the organizing committee for the preparation and celebration of the 1020th anniversary of Baptism of Kyivan Rus

=== Awards and titles ===
- Order of Merit, 3rd class (February 2005)
- Hero of Ukraine (Order of State, 2007)
- Honour Badge of the President of Ukraine (1996)
- Merited Functionary of Science and Technology of Ukraine (2006)
- State Prize of Ukraine in Science and Technology (2000)
- Honorary Doctor of the Cracow Pedagogical Academy
- Honorary Doctor of University of Wrocław
- Recipient of the Barabashov Prize of the National Academy of Sciences of Ukraine
- Diploma by the Presidium of the National Academy of Sciences of Ukraine "Expert of Public Education in the USSR" (1983)
- Diploma of Merit by the Academy of Sciences of the Ukrainian SSR (1977, 1981)

== Personal life ==
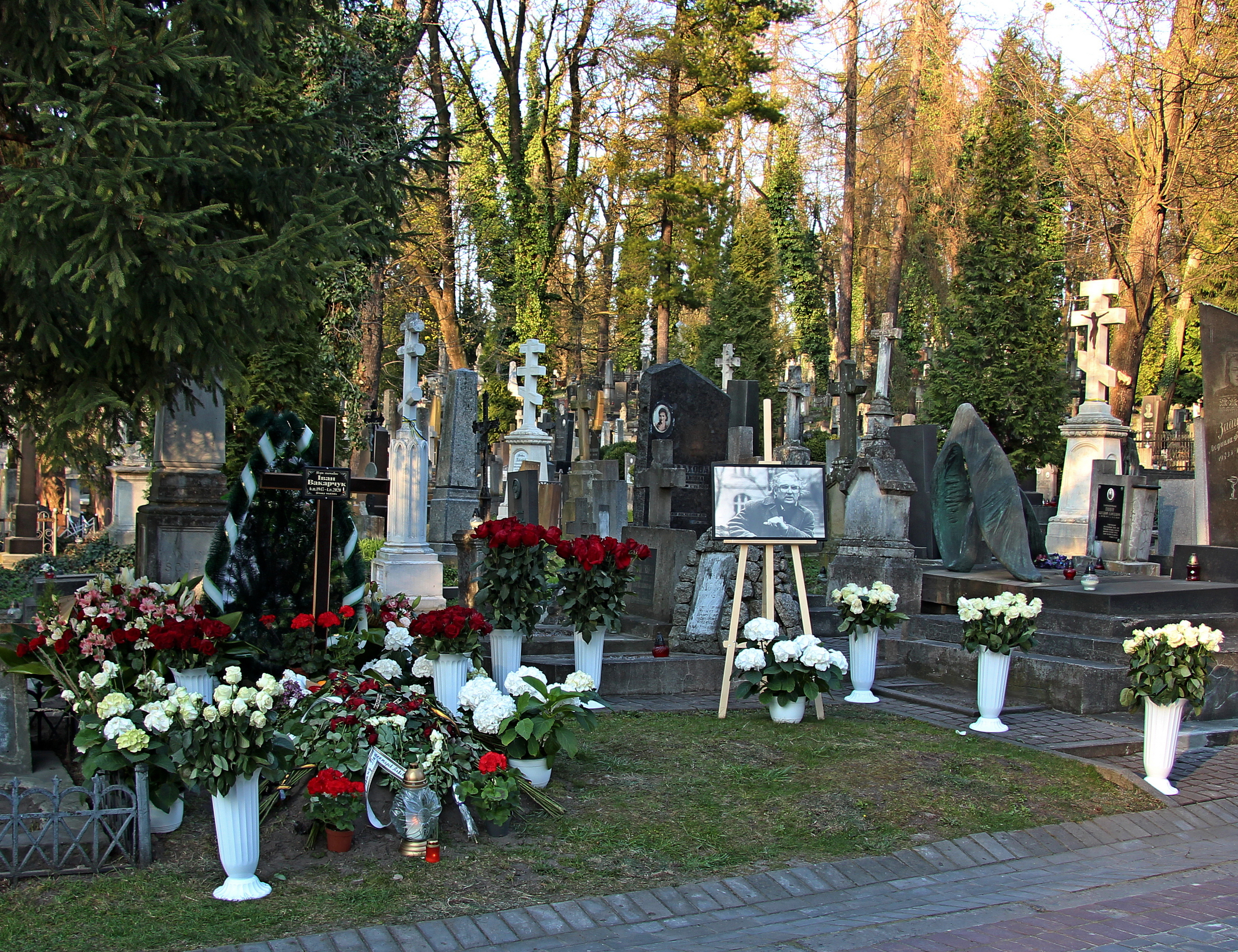
Grave of Ivan Vakarchuk at Lychakiv Cemetery

=== Family ===
Ivan Vakarchuk was married, his wife Svitlana (b. 1947) is a teacher of physics, assistant professor of Lviv National Stepan Gzhytsky University of Veterinary Medicine and Biotechnology. They had two sons: Svyatoslav Vakarchuk (b. 1975), who was a Ukrainian politician, founder of Holos party and frontman of "Okean Elzy", a famous Ukrainian rock band, and Oleh (b. 1980) - a bank employee.

=== Death ===
Vakarchuk died on 4 April 2020, at the age of 73 in Lviv. The cause of his death was not reported.
