= Sergiu Prodan =

Moldovan film director and politician

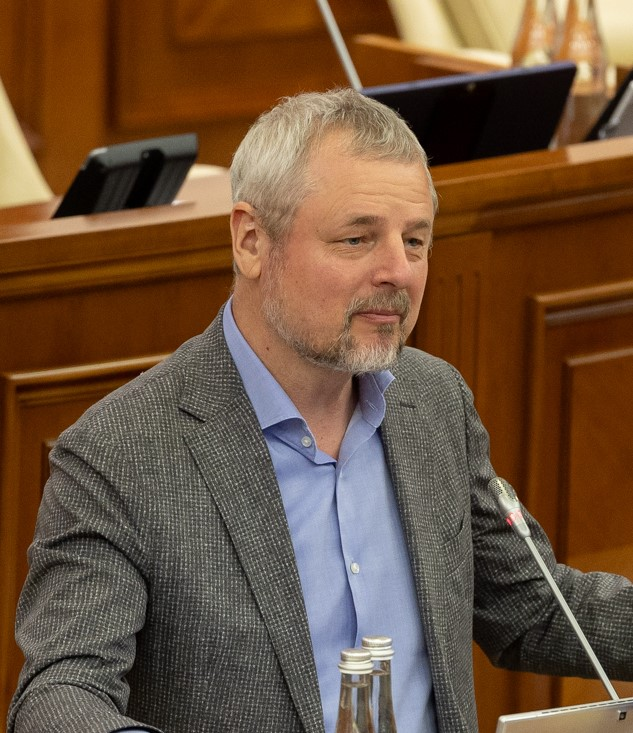
- Prodan in 2024

Minister of Culture
- In office 6 August 2021 – 1 November 2025
- President: Maia Sandu
- Prime Minister: Natalia Gavrilița; Dorin Recean
- Preceded by: Monica Babuc (2017)
- Succeeded by: Cristian Jardan

Personal details
- Born: 9 December 1963 (age 62) Bălți, Moldavian SSR, Soviet Union
- Education: Boris Shchukin Theatre Institute

Sergiu Prodan (born 9 December 1963) is a Moldovan film director. From 2021 to 2025, he held the office of Minister of Culture of the Republic of Moldova.

== Honours ==
=== Foreign honours ===
Ribbon	Country	Honour	Year	Ref
	Ukraine	Order of Merit, 2nd Class	2025	
