= Ghenadie Ciobanu =

Moldovan composer and politician (born 1957)

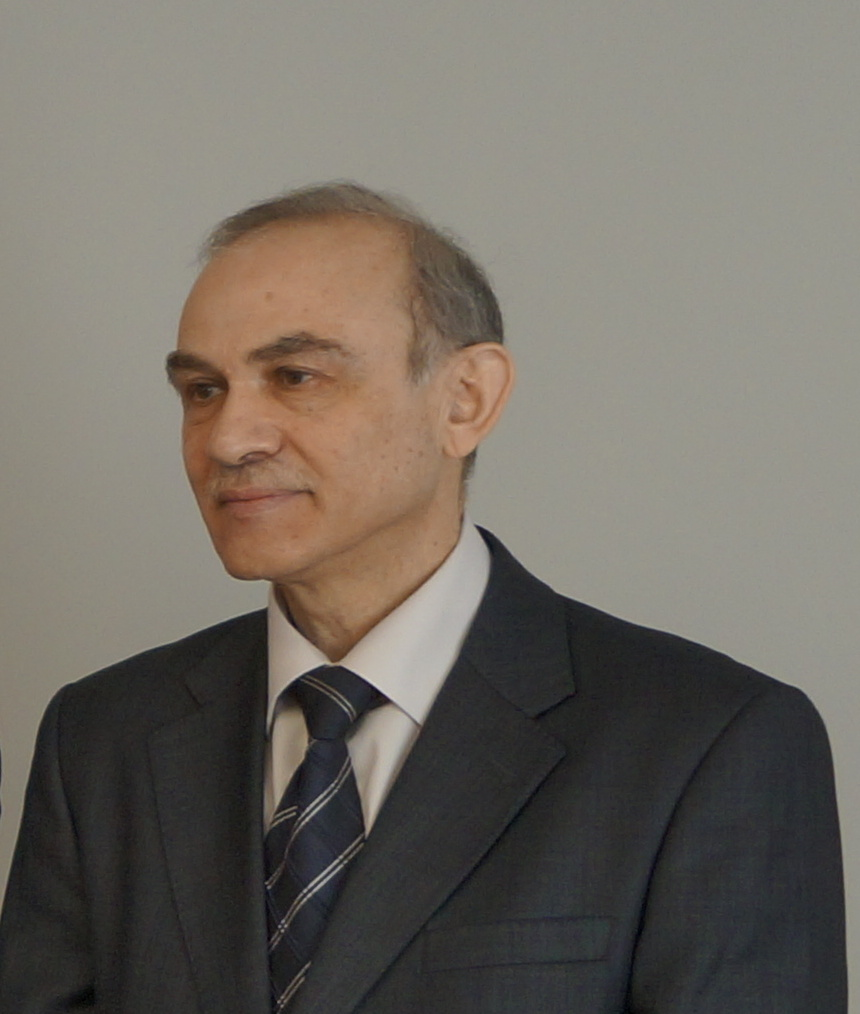
- Ciobanu in 2014

Member of the Moldovan Parliament
- In office 16 March 2010 – 9 December 2014
- Preceded by: Vladimir Hotineanu
- Parliamentary group: Liberal Democratic Party

Minister of Culture
- In office 24 January 1997 – 19 April 2001
- President: Petru Lucinschi; Vladimir Voronin
- Prime Minister: Ion Ciubuc; Ion Sturza; Dumitru Braghiș
- Preceded by: Mihail Cibotaru
- Succeeded by: Ion Păcuraru

Personal details
- Born: 6 April 1957 (age 69) Brătușeni, Moldavian SSR, Soviet Union
- Party: Liberal Democratic Party; Alliance for European Integration (2009–present)

Ghenadie Ciobanu (born 6 April 1957) is a Moldovan composer and politician. He served as the Minister of Culture of the Republic of Moldova from 1997 to 2001 and later as a deputy in the Parliament of the Republic of Moldova in the Liberal Democratic Party faction from 2010 to 2014.

Ciobanu has composed symphonies, works for chamber ensembles (instrumental), choral compositions, as well as music for theatre and film.

== Biography ==
Ghenadie Ciobanu was born on 6 April 1957 in Brătușeni, Edineț, Moldavian SSR. He graduated from the "Gnesin" Musical-Pedagogical Institute in Moscow (now the Gnessin State Musical College), faculty of piano (1982), and later from the "Gavriil Muzicescu" Conservatory in Chișinău, Department of Composition (1986).

He is the author of more than one hundred musical works across various genres, including opera, musical theatre, symphonic music, vocal-symphonic works, choral compositions, chamber music, and music for theatre and film. His works have been performed in numerous recitals and concerts in the Republic of Moldova, Romania, France, Germany, Greece, Spain, Israel, Denmark, Poland, Russia, Estonia, Ukraine, the United States, China, Italy, Bulgaria, Austria, Japan, Guatemala, El Salvador, Azerbaijan, the Czech Republic, Hungary, Canada, and other countries.

His compositions have been recorded on CDs and broadcast by Denmark Radio P2 (Copenhagen), Radio Romania, Radio Moscow, Teleradio Moldova, Radio Leipzig, Radio Amsterdam, and various radio and television stations in Italy, Spain (P2), the United Kingdom (GBEUR), the Czech Republic (CZCR), Portugal (PTRTP), Switzerland (SESR), and Croatia (HRHRTR), among others.

Ciobanu is a university professor and PhD at the Department of Musicology, Composition, and Jazz of the Academy of Music, Theatre and Fine Arts in Chișinău. He has also been a guest professor at several European universities and is the author of multiple scholarly works in the field of musicology. He served as President of the Union of Composers and Musicologists of Moldova (1990–2012) and has been its Honorary President since 2012. He has also been President of the Association of Contemporary Music of Moldova since 1993.

He is the founder and artistic director of the "Days of New Music" International Festival in Chișinău, as well as founder and artistic director of the "Ars poetica" ensemble. He has also produced and presented several radio programmes, including "The Studio of New Music," "Continuum. Musical Interferences," and "Musical Compositional Treasure," broadcast by the public company Teleradio-Moldova.

Ciobanu served as Minister of Culture of the Republic of Moldova from 1997 to 2001. He was also a member of the Parliament of the Republic of Moldova during the periods 2010–2011 and 2011–2014.

He has received numerous national and international awards and distinctions, including the Order of the Star of Romania in the rank of Commander (2000), the National Award of the Republic of Moldova (1998), the honorary title Master of Arts (1999), the title Doctor Honoris Causa of the "Gheorghe Dima" Academy of Music in Cluj-Napoca (1997), the medal "150 Years Since the Birth of Mihai Eminescu" (Romania, 2000), the Order of Labour Glory (Republic of Moldova, 2010), the Order "Dimitrie Cantemir" of the Academy of Sciences of Moldova (2013), the Award of the Union of Composers and Musicologists of Romania (2019), the Ministry of Culture's "George Enescu" Award in musical composition, and several awards of the Union of Composers and Musicologists of the Republic of Moldova.

== Works (selection) ==
- Ateh, or The Revelations of the Khazar Princess. Mono-opera-ballet. Text by Milorad Pavić (from the Dictionary of the Khazars). Libretto by Ghenadie Ciobanu after Milorad Pavić (2004)
- The Gates. Musical. Libretto by Ghenadie Ciobanu; poetry by Radmila Popovici-Paraschiv (2010)
- Apolodor. Opera–musical, after The Apolodor by Gelu Naum (2016)
- Under the Sun and Stars. Symphony (1989)
- The Birds and the Water. Symphonic pictures for ballet (2001)
- Enescu Code, for string orchestra (2007)
- The Rites of Spring. Symphonic suite: Entrée, Dance with Fires on Snow, Mountain (2010–2018)
- The Oriental Songs. Homage to Dimitrie Cantemir for symphonic orchestra (2013)
- Glance Behind the Curtain / Glance for the Curtain, for string orchestra (2016)
- Après une Lecture. Vocal-symphonic cycle: The Post-modern Poem, The Rap Poem, The Elegiac Poem. Poetry by Emilian Galaicu-Păun and Valeriu Matei (2014–2016)
- The Moments. Concerto for violin and symphonic orchestra (2015)
- The Breeze of Southern Latitudes. Concerto for marimba and symphonic orchestra (2009)
- The Ode to Becoming, for choir and symphonic orchestra. Poetry by D. Matcovschi (2013)
- De profundis... My Generation. Cantata for choir and symphonic orchestra. Poetry by A. Akhmatova
- Deux chansons, for soprano and chamber ensemble. Poetry by Valeriu Matei and Matei Vișniec (2018)
- Simple Poems of Being, for bassoon and symphonic orchestra (2021)
- The Time Passes. Capriccio for clarinet and piano (2017)
- …cette fois-ci à Paris. Fantasia quasi una sonata for piano (2017)
- De sonata meditor, for piano (2003)
- Sound Etudes for chamber ensemble: They Will Come from Silence; …and Coming One by One They Will Merge; The White Silence; From Over There; The Signs That Are Reflected in the Sky (1995–2006)
- Rhapsody-Concerto for piano and symphonic orchestra (1984)
- Musica dolorosa, symphonic poem (1986–1987)
- Nostalgia for the Festivity: Concerto No. 2 for piano and symphonic orchestra (1988)
- The Bride's Grief, for mixed choir (1993)
- Our Father, for mixed choir (1994)
- The Sad Symbols, for clarinet (1990)
- Spatium Sonans, for flute (1997)
- From Songs and Dances of the Melancholic Moon, cycle for clarinet and percussion (1995–2003)
- Pentaculus minus, for woodwind quartet (1996)
- Brass Quintet (1991)
- The Ninth Moon, for mezzo-soprano, English horn and percussion
- Un viaggio immaginario, for string orchestra (2000)
- Spirits of Bards, for soprano and baritone (2022)
- Forgotten Words of Lost Songs, for soprano, baritone and piano (2024)
- Le canzoni che mi lasciano, for violin, viola, cello and double bass (2023)
- Spirit of Autumn, for soprano, clarinet and percussion (2022)
- The Rite of Celebration, for bass clarinet (2023)
- Rock Valley’s Sounds, for multipercussion and tape (2024 version)
- Der Raum der Nacht, for flute, piano and percussion (2019)
- The Morning Shadows, for flute, piano and percussion (2019)
- String Quartet (2020)
- Meditation and Games, for flute (or clarinet) (2018)
- Genesis, for flute (or clarinet) (2018)
- The Games of the Reflected Light, for flute (or clarinet) (2018)
- Dream of a Cloud, I, II, III (2023–2024)
- Fairy Tales, for flute, oboe or clarinet (2024)

=== Movie music ===
- Whirlpool (1992), directed by Oleg Tulaev
- Medea-80 (1988), directed by Andrei Vartic
- Ladybug (1991), directed by Alecu Deleu
- Exercise in White (1991), directed by Sergiu Plămădeală
- The Trial of the Circle (1991), directed by Alecu Deliu
- Miorița (1991), directed by Alecu Deleu
- Children's Dreams, directed by Sergei Davidoff (USA)
- Orange Island (1985), directed by Liubov Apraxina
- The Best Weapons in the World (1986), directed by Liubov Apraxina
- Apogones (1988), directed by Liubov Apraxina
- And It Was Good (1990), directed by Sergiu Plămădeală
- Salon No. 6 (1998), 3-episode series, directed by Vitalie Țapeș

== General references ==
- Ghenadie Ciobanu. Biobliografie / Acad. de Muzică, Teatru și Arte plastice. ISBN 978-9975-65-437-2, OCLC 1090778199. Chișinău, Editura Lumina, 2016
- Muzicieni din România: Lexicon biobibliografic / Viorel Cosma - Onești; Magic Print, 2016. ISBN 978-606-622-267-9
