= Cristian Jardan =

Moldovan journalist (born 1983)

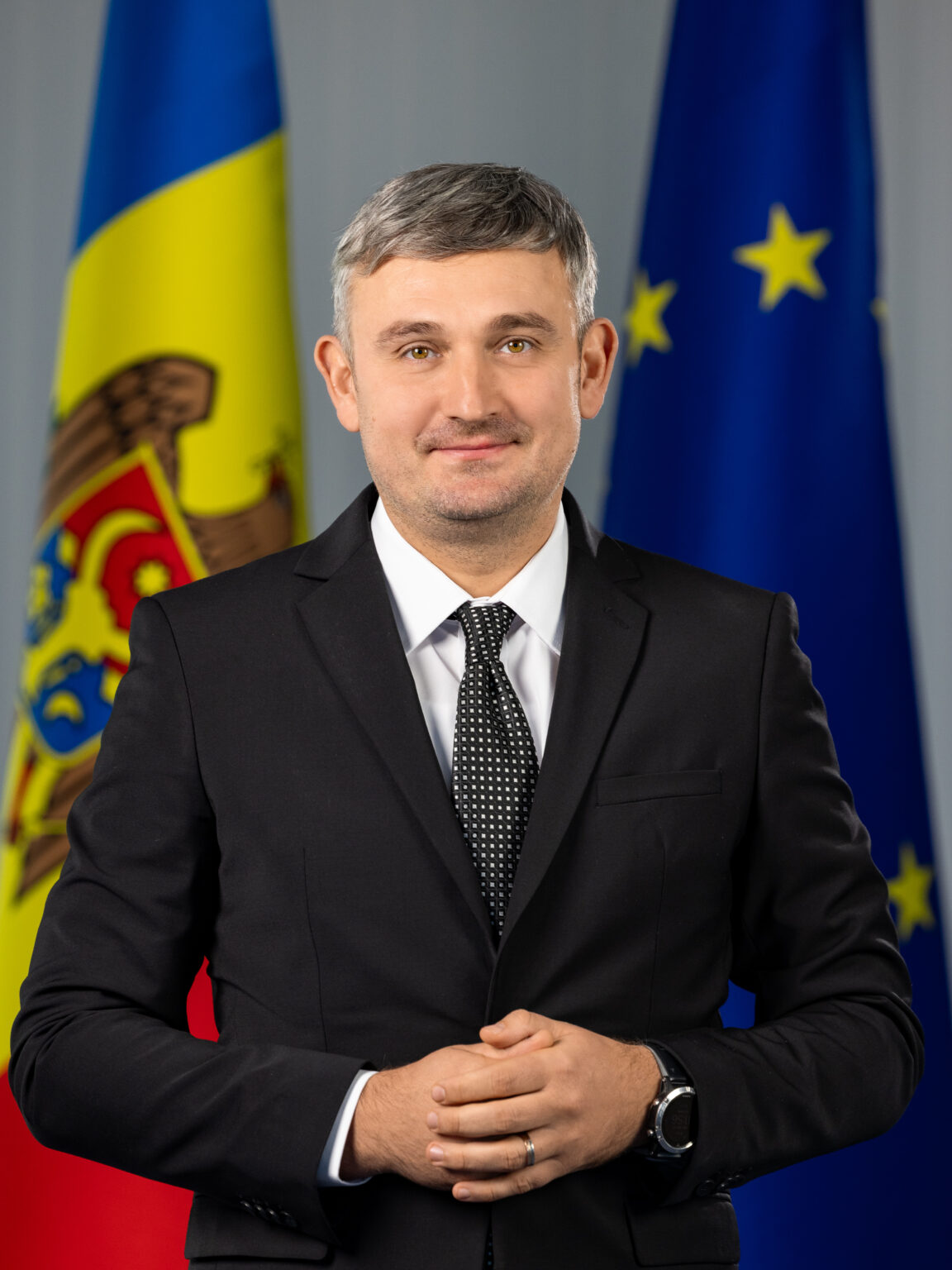
- Official portrait, 2025

Minister of Culture
- In office 1 November 2025 – 22 July 2026
- President: Maia Sandu
- Prime Minister: Alexandru Munteanu; Eugen Osmochescu (acting)
- Preceded by: Sergiu Prodan
- Succeeded by: Dan Suruceanu

Personal details
- Born: 18 May 1983 (age 43) Cornești, Moldavian SSR, Soviet Union
- Education: Babeș-Bolyai University

Cristian Jardan (born 18 May 1983) is a Moldovan journalist who served as Minister of Culture of Moldova in the Munteanu Cabinet.
