= Dan Suruceanu =

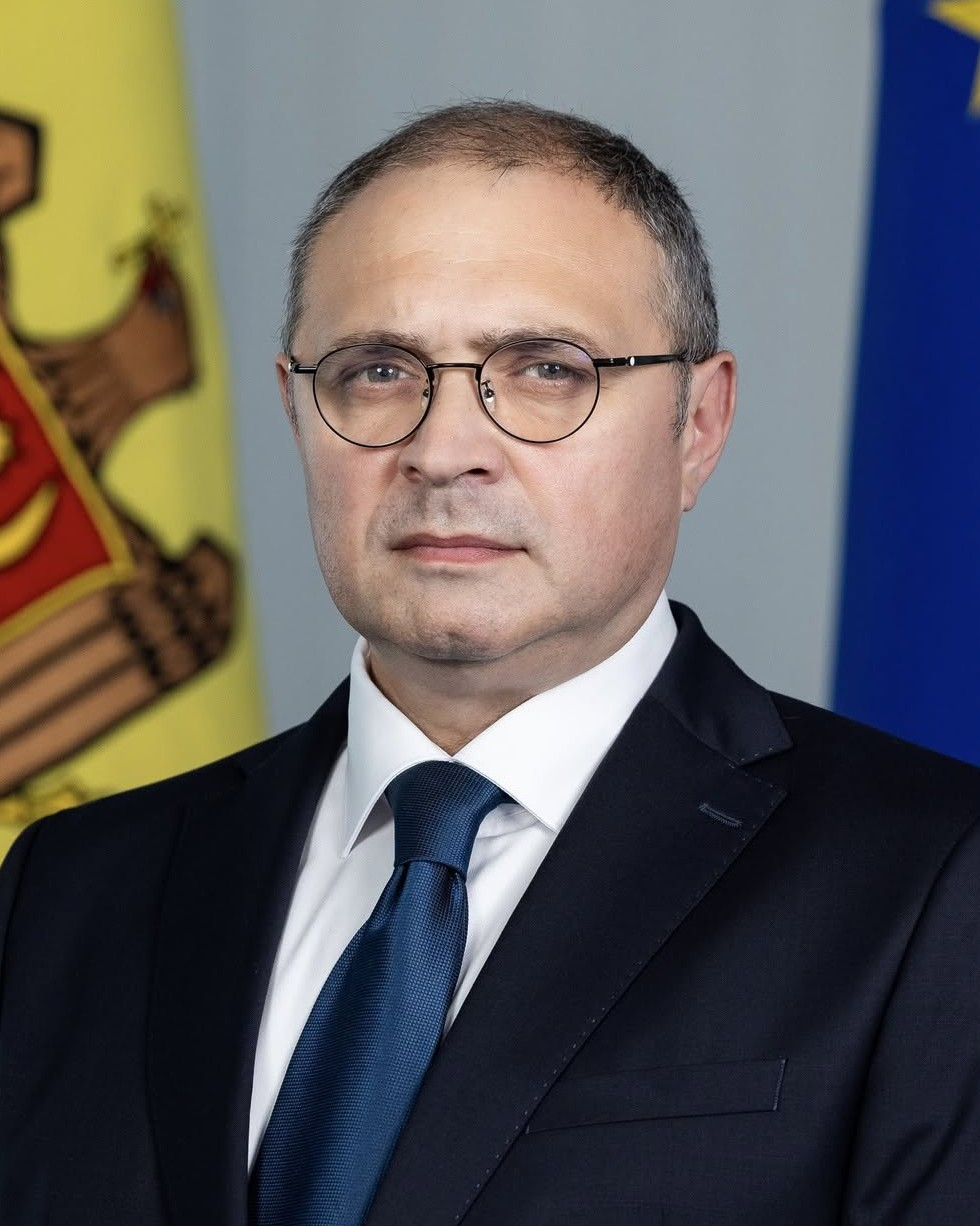
- Official portrait, 2026

Minister of Culture
- Incumbent
- Assumed office 22 July 2026
- President: Maia Sandu
- Prime Minister: Vasile Tofan
- Preceded by: Cristian Jardan

Personal details
- Born: 30 June 1968 (age 58) Chișinău, Moldavian SSR, Soviet Union
- Relations: Ion Suruceanu (uncle)
- Education: Ion Creangă State Pedagogical University of Chișinău; M. V. Lomonosov Moscow State University

Dan Suruceanu (born 30 June 1968) is a Moldovan manager. He serves as Minister of Culture of Moldova in the Tofan Cabinet.
