= Arkady Luxemburg =

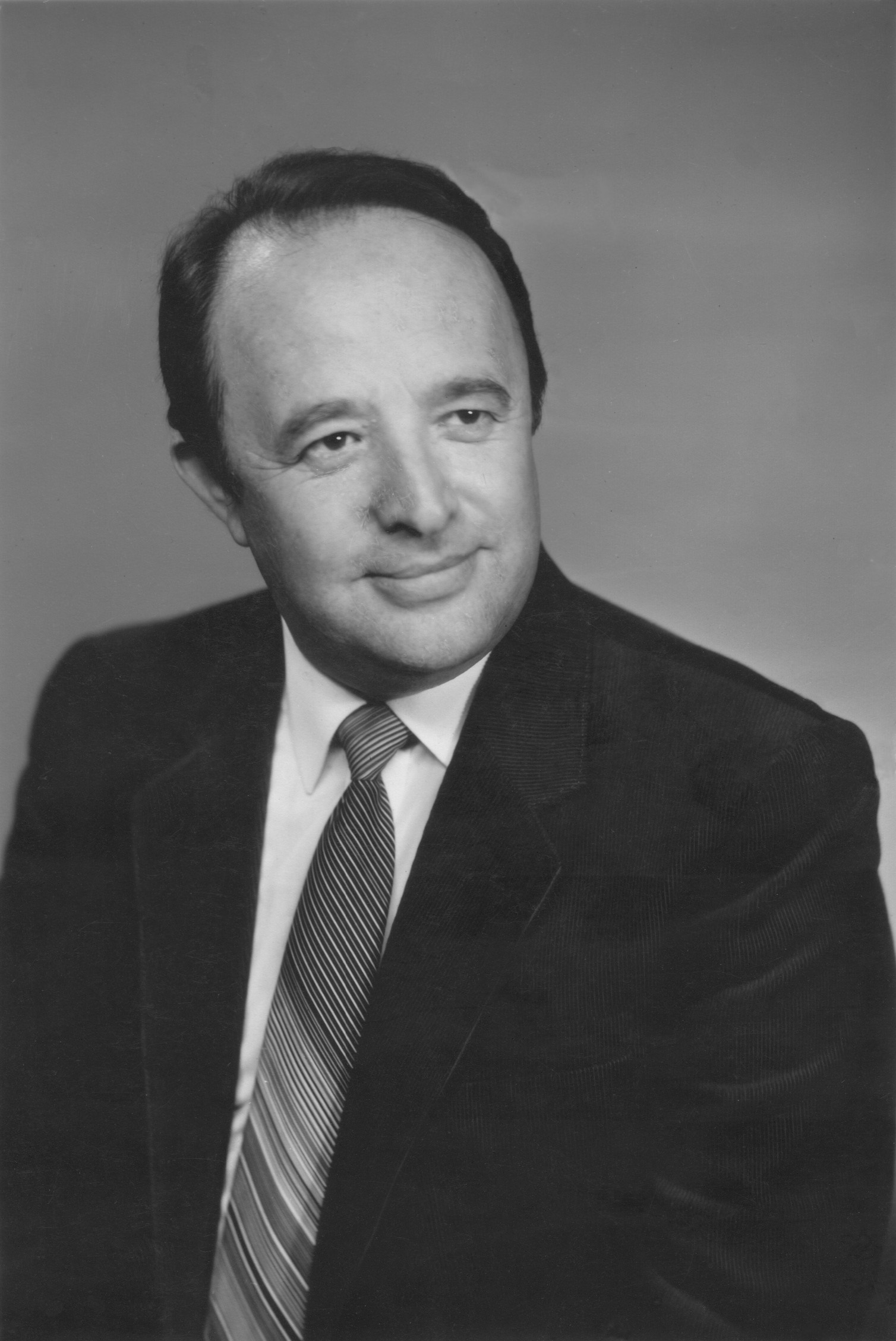

Background information
- Born: Arkady Petrovych Luxemburg; 15 March 1939 (age 87); Zhytomyr, Ukrainian SSR, Soviet Union
- Genres: Classical, Pop, Jazz, Film score
- Occupations: Composer, Pianist
- Instruments: Piano, keyboards

Arkady Luxemburg (born 15 March 1939) is a Moldovan-American composer.

He received a Master of Arts degree at the Academy of Music in Chișinău, Moldovan SSR in the former Soviet Union, where he received degrees in piano performance, composition, and music theory. He has worked as an instructor, a concert pianist, and an accompanist at various institutions around the world, including the Moldova Academy of Music, the Moldova College of Music, the Moldova School of Music, San Diego State University, Mesa College, California Ballet and David Yellin College. Several of his students have gone on to become world known performers, including Oleg Maisenberg and Mark Seltzer.
He has authored several works on Music Theory and Harmony. Arkady was given the Moldovan Composer of the Year award in 1967.
He is a member of the Union of Composers and ASCAP in the US.

Notable symphonic works include: "Sinfonietta", Symphony for Strings, Two Concertos for Piano with Orchestra, Concerto for Cello with Orchestra, Symphony Fantasy "Spring Melodies." Notable works for piano solo include: "Aquarelie", "In Memory of Shostakovich", "In Memory of Gershwin", Sonata, Sonatina, "Blueses", "Preludes".

A large portion of his works are recorded. They are regularly published and played in Czechia and Slovakia, the former Soviet Union, Romania, Hungary, Israel, France, and the United States. Since 1995, he has resided in San Diego, California where he continued his career as a Performer, Composer and Instructor.

== Works for Symphony Orchestra ==
1. Sinfonietta
2. Concertos for Piano and Orchestra No. 1
3. Concertos for Piano and Orchestra No. 2
4. Concerto for Cello and Orchestra
5. Symphonic Ballad "Andriesh" for Orchestra
6. Suite # 1 for Strings
7. Suite # 2 for Strings
8. Fantasy for Piano and String Orchestra
9. Symphony Fantasy "Spring Melodies"
10. Caprice for Flute and String Orchestra
11. Symphony Ballad for Voice and Orchestra
12. Waltz for Voice and Orchestra
13. "Children's Suite" for Chamber Orchestra
14. "Melody" and "Scherzo" for String Orchestra
15. "Variations" for Orchestra
16. Symphony for Strings
17. "Elegy" and "Ragtime" for Orchestra
18. "Youth Overture" for Orchestra
19. "Poem" for Strings.

== Works for various ensembles ==
1. "Preludes" 12 Pieces for String Quartet
2. Suite for String Quartet
3. 3 Pieces for String Quartet
4. "Lullaby and Ostinato" for Wood-Winds Quintet
5. "Improvisation and Scherzo" for Flute, Cello and Piano
6. "Lullaby and Humoresque" for Brass Quintet
7. "Hava Nagila" Arrangement for Brass Quintet
8. Suite for 5 Saxophones
9. "Blues and Rock and Roll" for 4 Trombones
10. "Romance and Foxtrot" for 4 Trumpets
11. 3 Pieces for 4 Horns
12. "Prelude and Ostinato" for 4 Violins
13. "Cheerful Train" for Violins Ensemble and Piano
14. "Passacaglia and Dance" for Flute, Horn and Piano
15. Suite for Wood-Winds Quartet
16. 3 Pieces for Clarinet and Bassoon
17. Three Pieces for Violin, Viola and Cello

== Works for Piano ==
1. Sonata
2. Suite "Aquarelie" 8 Pieces
3. Suite "In Memory of Gershwin" 5 Pieces
4. Sonatina No. 1, No. 2, No. 3, No. 4, No. 5.
5. 3 Pieces "In Memory of Shostakovich"
6. "Suite for Children" in Folk Style
7. "Bluses" 8 Pieces
8. "Preludes" 12 Pieces
9. "Children Album" 9 Pieces
10. Suite in Old style for Cembalo or Piano 4 Pieces
11. "Preludes" 8 Pieces
12. "Improvisation and Toccata"
13. Moods five miniatures for Piano
14. Doina, Hora, Betuta and Jok for Piano 4 Pieces
15. "Seasons" 4 Pieces 1. "Spring", 2. "Summer", 3. "Autumn", 4. "Winter"
16. "Easy pieces" for Piano
17. "Children Album for Piano No.2" 16 Pieces
18. Piano Method 220 pieces.

== Other works ==
Various works for Strings, Brass, Wood-Winds, Voice and Piano, Choir, Pop and Jazz Songs,
Music for Theatre and Films.

== Film scores ==
Alexander Plamadeala
The Dream of My Life
Postmark Paradise
Ballet Variations
