= Gloria (Okean Elzy album) =

GLORIA

Studio album by Okean Elzy
- Released: 2005
- Genre: rock

Okean Elzy chronology
Supersymetriya (2001)	GLORIA (2005)	Mira (2007)

GLORIA is an album by Ukrainian pop-rock and alternative band Okean Elzy, released in 2005.

The album spawned four # 1 singles (radio airplay) in Ukraine. The first single was "Bez Boyu" in the summer of 2005, followed by "Vysche Neba", "Ne Pytai", and finally "Vidchuvayu" in the summer of 2006.

== Track listing ==
1. "Persha Pisnya" (Ukrainian: Перша Пісня; English: The First Song)
2. "Ty i Ya" (Ukrainian: Ти і Я; English: You and Me)
3. "Vysche Neba" (Ukrainian: Вище Неба; English: Higher Than The Sky)
4. "Sontse Sidaye" (Ukrainian: Сонце Сідaє; English: The Sun Is Setting)
5. "Nikoly" (Ukrainian: Ніколи; English: Never)
6. "Tin Tvoho Tila" (Ukrainian: Тінь Твого Тіла; English: Shadow of Your Body)
7. "Bez Boyu" (Ukrainian: Без Бою; English: Without a Fight)
8. "GLORIA"
9. "Vidchuvayu" (Ukrainian: Відчуваю; English: I'm Feeling)
10. "Ikony Ne Plachut" (Ukrainian: Ікони Не Плачуть; English: Icons Don't Cry)
11. "Yak Ostanniy Den" (Ukrainian: Як Останній День; English: Like the Last Day)
12. "Ne Pytai" (Ukrainian: Не Питай; English: Don't Ask)
