= Sviatoslav Vakarchuk =

Ukrainian musician, politician and activist (born 1975)

Sviatoslav Vakarchuk Святослав Вакарчук
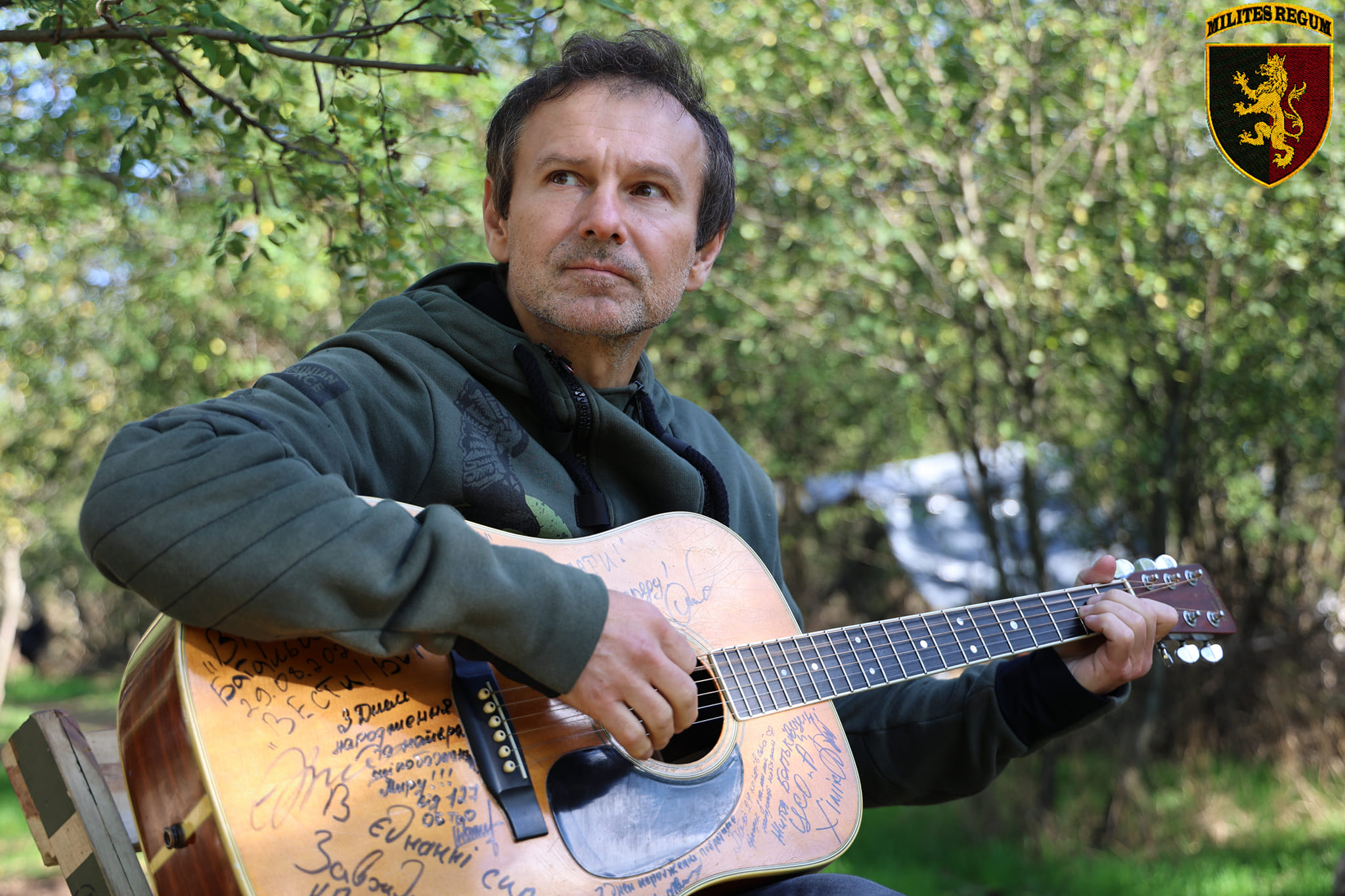
- Vakarchuk in 2022

Background information
- Also known as: Slava Vakarchuk
- Born: Sviatoslav Ivanovych Vakarchuk; 14 May 1975 (age 51); Mukachevo, Zakarpattia Oblast, Ukrainian SSR, Soviet Union
- Genre: Rock
- Occupations: Singer, politician
- Years active: 1994–present
- Member of: Okean Elzy
- Website: okeanelzy.com
- Scientific career
- Thesis: Суперсиметрія електрона в магнітному полі (2009)

Sviatoslav Ivanovych "Slava" Vakarchuk (Ukrainian: Святослав Іванович "Слава" Вакарчук; born 14 May 1975) is a Ukrainian musician, politician, public activist, and soldier. He is the lead vocalist of Okean Elzy, a rock band in Ukraine. Vakarchuk is a former People's Deputy of Ukraine, and the founder of the Voice (in May 2019).

Vakarchuk was active in supporting the Orange Revolution and Euromaidan, and is involved in many social and cultural projects. He is one of the most successful musicians in Ukraine and has a PhD degree in theoretical physics.

Vakarchuk is the son of Ivan Vakarchuk, a professor of physics at Lviv University and a former Ukrainian Minister of Education and Science.

== Biography ==
=== Musical career ===
Vakarchuk was born in the western Ukrainian city of Mukachevo, into a family of scientists. His mother and father were both university professors of physics. His father Ivan Vakarchuk (1947-2020) served as Ukraine's Education Minister.

Vakarchuk founded the band Okean Elzy ("Ocean of Elza"), in 1994 as an undergraduate at Lviv University. At this university he earned a Ph.D. in the field of supersymmetry. After graduating Vakarchuk moved to Kyiv.

In 2005, Vakarchuk answered all questions correctly and won the grand prize (₴1 million) for the first time on the Ukrainian version of Who Wants to Be a Millionaire?, called Khto khoche staty milyonerom? – Pershyi milyon. He donated his winnings to orphanages in Ukraine.

In support of their album "Zemlya" in spring 2013, the band embarked on a stadium tour throughout cities in Ukraine, Russia, Belarus, the US, Canada, and a number of countries in Western Europe.

In December 2013, Okean Elzy performed during the Euromaidan protests.

In the summer of 2014, Okean Elzy performed a number of large concerts in the biggest stadiums in Ukraine to mark the band's 20th anniversary. Their performance in Kyiv's Olympic Stadium broke the record for the largest number of people attending a concert by a Ukrainian band — over 75,000.

In 2024, Okean Elzy released two albums in the same year, and to celebrate went on tour in Europe and the US. During this tour, which coincided with the band's 30th anniversary and included new cities it had previously not played at, Okean Elzy raised funds for Ukraine.

=== Political career ===
In the early 30 September 2007 parliamentary election, he ran as an independent candidate on the Our Ukraine–People's Self-Defense Bloc's list (as No. 15). In the Verkhovna Rada (Ukrainian parliament) he was a member of the parliamentary committee for freedom of speech issues. He was also a member of groups of parliamentary contacts with the Russian Federation and other countries. Vakarchuk did not submit any legislative acts during his deputy's term. He submitted two amendments, one of which was accepted by the Verkhovna Rada. In early September 2008, he renounced his seat in the Verkhovna Rada due to the political situation. On 16 December 2008, the Verkhovna Rada accepted Vakarchuk's renunciation. According to Vakarchuk, he renounced his seat because “I was really frustrated by the level of mutual fights, at the absurd Hobbesian world of all against all, rather than changing the country for the better.”

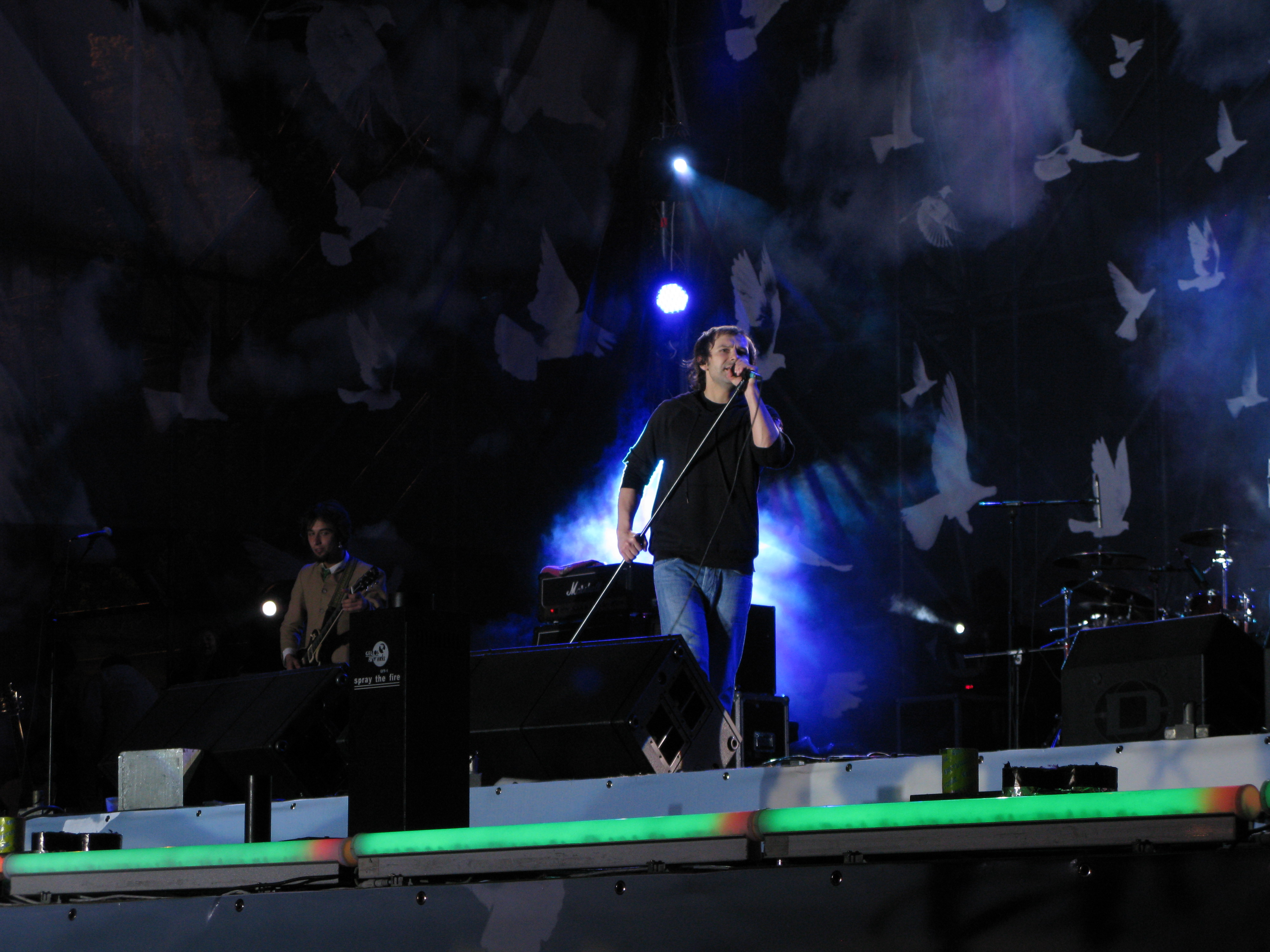
Svyatoslav Vakarchuk in Kharkiv, Ukraine on 19 April 2008

In 2008, Vakarchuk released a solo project "Vnochi" (In the Night). This album was released under the name of Svyatoslav Vakarchuk, but it includes appearances by all members of Okean Elzy and other various guest musicians. Another solo project followed in 2011, "Brussel" (Brussels).

In 2015, Vakarchuk took part in the Yale World Fellows international fellowship program at Yale University.

Vakarchuk stated multiple times in 2017 that he had no political ambitions. However, in 2018 he joined Stanford University as a visiting scholar, focusing on politics and leadership. Later that year he appeared at several politically themed conferences, speaking alongside established Ukrainian politicians. This led the public to view him as a potential candidate for the 2019 Ukrainian presidential election, where he became one of the frontrunners according to opinion polls. But by late 2018 he was overtaken by other potential candidates, and in October 2018 he stated “Who can change the political culture is more important than who becomes the president.” (Note: In January 2019, Ukrainska Pravda commented that Vakarchuk was not going to go to take part in the 2019 Ukrainian presidential election but that his likely goal was to participate in parliamentary elections.) In the election Vakarchuk did not back any of the candidates. According to an early March 2019 poll by sociological group "RATING", 64% of the electorate would have liked to see Vakarchuk among the presidential candidates.

Vakarchuk also plays an active role in social and cultural projects, and is the founder of the charity foundation "Lyudi Maybutnyoho" (People of the Future). The main projects of the foundation were "Knyga Tvoryt' Lyudynu" (A Book Creates a Man), "Osvita Krainoyu" (The Country's Education), "3-D Proekt. Dumay, Diy, Dopomagai." (3-D Project. Think, Act. Help.). Together with the members of the band he actively supported the preventive campaign IOM and MTV Europe's "People Are Not For Sale." In 2003, Vakarchuk became an Honorary Ambassador of Culture in Ukraine. In 2005, he became a Goodwill Ambassador for the United Nations Development Programme.

On 16 May 2019, Vakarchuk announced the creation of a new political party, Holos (Voice or Vote), with the aim to participate in the July 2019 parliamentary election. Vakarchuk assured on 19 May 2019 that if elected to parliament, he would not stop playing music, but political activity would be a priority. He also claimed that he believed that currently the Ukrainian parliament is the place "where real changes are being made" so he did not participate in the presidential election of the previous month. Vakarchuk was elected to the Verkhovna Rada in July 2019. His party gained 5.82% of the vote. On 11 June 2020 Vakarchuk registered in parliament a request to terminate his parliamentary mandate. He insisted that he did not plan to end his political career but would be working on extra-parliamentary activities for his party. On 18 June 2020 parliament rejected the draft resolution on the early termination of Vakarchuk's parliamentary mandate (the resolution was supported by 175 deputies, while 226 votes minimum were required). The next day Vakarchuk left his party's faction so the party could terminate his mandate via a party congress. His party did indeed do this on 26 June 2020. Vakarchuk was replaced in parliament by Andriy Sharaskin.

=== Personal life ===
His life partner from the beginning of the 2000s until 2021 was Lialia Fonariova. Together they raised Lialia's daughter from her first marriage with Volodymyr Tarasyuk; she was later adopted by Vakarchuk. The couple had no children together.

In June 2021, Vakarchuk announced the end of his relationship with Lialia as a couple,

He is currently in a relationship with Yevheniia Yatsuta. The couple has two children — Ivan (born in 2021) and Solomiya (born in 2022).

The Ukrainian magazine Korrespondent has ranked him as one of the 100 most influential people in Ukraine (in 2008 ranked 55).

Vakarchuk speaks Ukrainian, Russian, English and Polish fluently.

During the 2022 Russian invasion of Ukraine, Vakarchuk joined the Ukrainian army. He joined the territorial defence battalion of Lviv Oblast on 7 March 2022.

== Awards ==
- Merited Artist of Ukraine (2005)
- Vasyl Stus Prize (2014)
- Honorary Citizen of Lviv (2015)
- Honorary Citizen of Kyiv (2015)
- Order of Liberty of Ukraine (2016)

== Discography ==
Vakarchuk has released nine studio albums together with his band, Okean Elzy:

- Tam, de nas nema (Where there is no us 1998)
- Ya na nebi buv (I was in heaven, 2000)
- Model (2001)
- Supersymetriya (Supersymmetry, 2003)
- GLORIA (2005)
- Mira (Measure, 2007)
- Dolce Vita (2010)
- Zemlia (Earth, 2013)
- Bez mezh (Limitless, 2016)
- Lighthouse (2024)
- Toy den (2024)

and also one live acoustic album Tviy format (Your Format, 2003).

== Notes ==
Preceded by New title	Most beautiful by VIVA! 2005; With: Ani Lorak	Succeeded by Oleksandr Shovkovskyi
