= Okean Elzy =

Ukrainian rock band

Okean Elzy Океан Ельзи
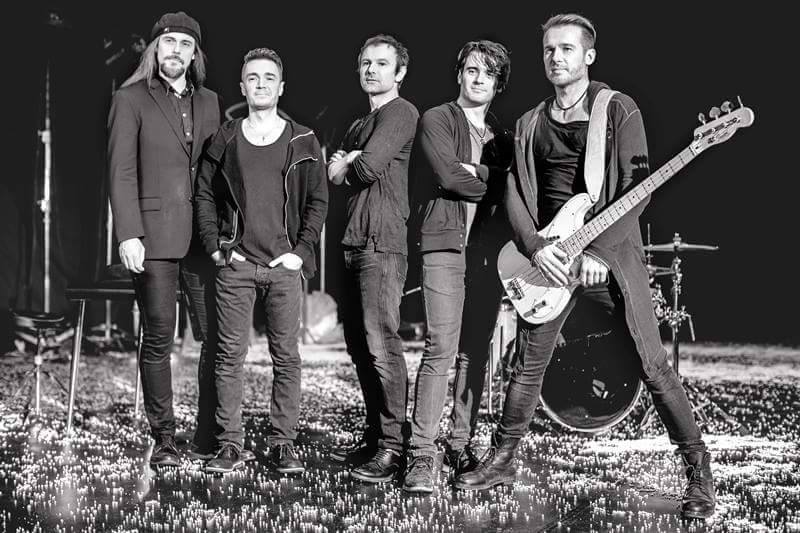
- Okean Elzy in 2016

Background information
- Origin: Lviv, Ukraine
- Genres: Rock
- Years active: 1994–present
- Labels: Moon; COMP; EMI; Lavina; Nova
- Members: Svyatoslav Vakarchuk; Vladimir Opsenica; Denys Dudko; Miloš Jelić; Denys Hlinin
- Past members: Pavlo Hudimov; Yuriy Khustochka; Dmytro Shurov; Petro Cherniavsky
- Website: http://www.okeanelzy.com

Okean Elzy (Ukrainian: Океан Ельзи, lit. 'Elza's Ocean'), also known under the abbreviation O.E., is a Ukrainian rock band formed in 1994 in Lviv, Ukraine. It is recognized as one of the most popular Ukrainian rock bands. The band's vocalist, author of songs and frontman is Svyatoslav Vakarchuk. In April 2007 Okean Elzy received Fuzz Magazine music awards for "Best rock act".

== History ==
=== 1994–1999 ===
The band Okean Elzy was founded in 1994 by four young men from Lviv; who were former members of the band Klan Tyshi (Ukrainian: Клан тиші, lit. 'Clan of Silence') which was founded in 1991. The original line-up featured a lead vocal, lead guitar, bass guitar and drums. Throughout 1994 the band spent their time rehearsing.

Their first concert took place in front of the Lviv Opera Theatre on 14 January 1995. Shortly after that appearance they released a demo tape called 'Demo 94-95'. In 1995 they also participated for the first time in the two biggest (at the time) Ukrainian music festivals - Chervona Ruta and Melodiya, also participated in Is, a personal project of Lviv musician Oleg Sook, performed the song Long time ago.

In 1996 the band establish themselves on the festival circuit in Ukraine and beyond. Okean Elzy participated at Sribna Pidkova Festival, Alternative 2, Perlyny Sezonu, Tavriyski Ihry, Trust Open Air Gernsbach (Germany), Trash 96, and R.F.I. 96 (France).

In 1996 Okean Elzy also held their first concert outside Lviv. Their first appearance in the capital Kyiv took place in 1996 where they supported Deep Purple. In November–December of that year they recorded and released the group's first maxi-single Budynok zi skla ("House of glass"). Shortly afterwards the first movie about the group was made by the TV channel TET and was broadcast nationally.

1997 saw tours in the south of France and in the west of Germany. Back to Ukraine they held a concert in their hometown of Lviv, drawing massive crowds.

The band's big break came in 1998, when they made the decision to move to Kyiv. There they started working on their first album Tam, de nas nema ("There, where we are not"). The group's first music video was recorded for the song "Tam, de nas nema". This video was the first piece of modern Ukrainian music to make its mark on MTV Russia, as well as France's MCM Channel.

At the very beginning of 1999, Okean Elzy started working on their second album Ya na nebi buv ("I was in the sky"). In May the group decided to try to expand their fan base into Russia. Their first concert was at the festival Maxidrom. There were thousands of people there who already knew their songs, with many singing along.

On 16 September they played a solo concert at the MCM Cafe in Paris.

=== 2000–2004 ===
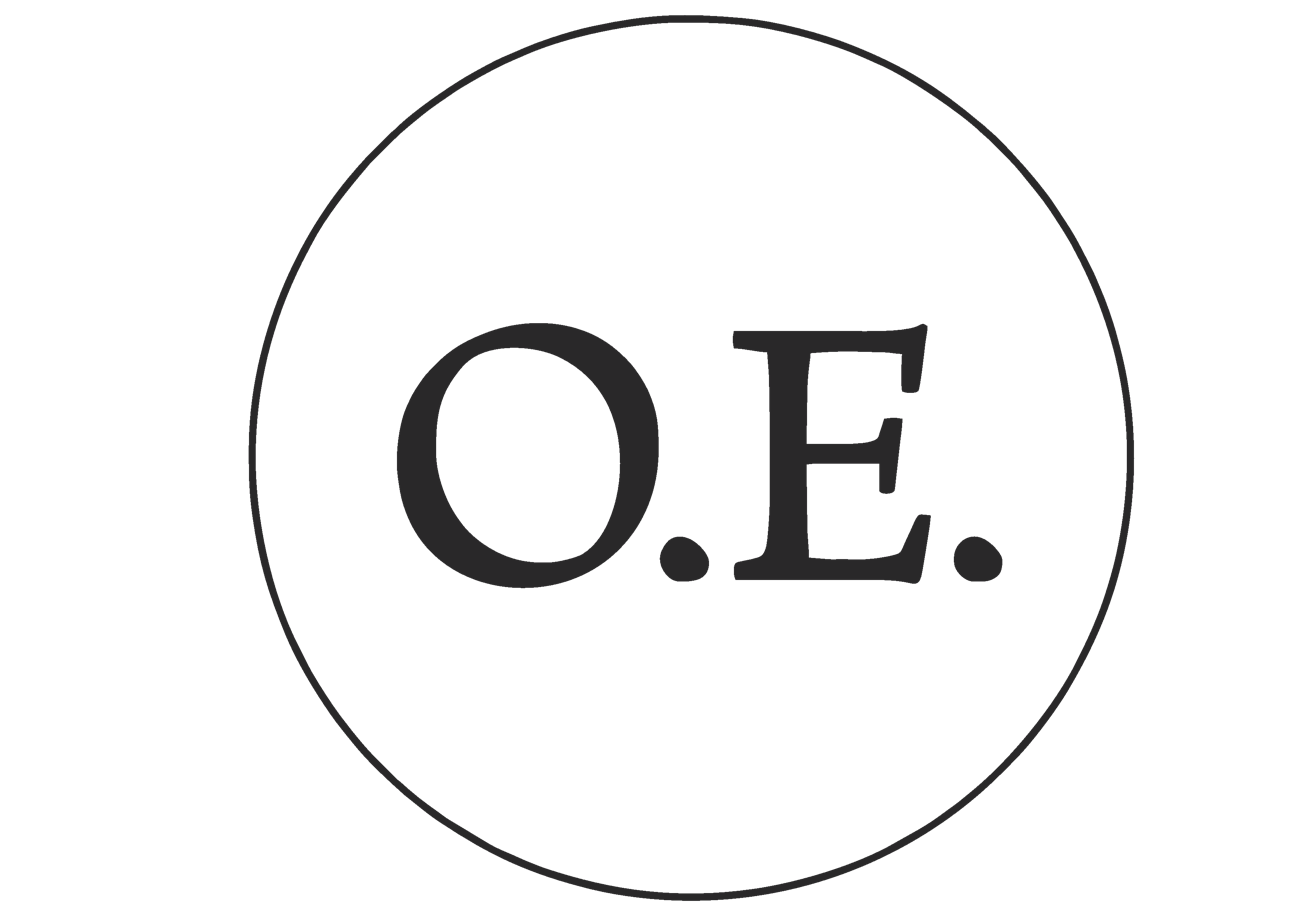
Logo of the band

In 2000, exactly one year after they started working on the album, Ya na nebi buv was released.

On 5 February Okean Elzy held a solo concert at the legendary Astoria Club (London). In March the keyboard player joined the band.

In 2001 Okean Elzy became the new face of Pepsi Cola in Ukraine as the new millennium dawned. They released their third album Model. The band launched a big tour around Ukraine called "Ask For More". In August they started working on their fourth album—Supersymetriya ("Supersymmetry"). The album was eventually released in 2003 and immediately the group embarked on their biggest tour ever.

At the end of 2003 Svyatoslav Vakarchuk, as the frontman of the band, became an official Ambassador of Ukrainian Culture.

In 2004 Denys Dudko (Ukrainian jazz bass player) and Miloš Jelić (composer from Novi Sad, Serbia) joined the band.

During the Orange Revolution, Okean Elzy actively supported the democratic changes which the population were demanding, with Slava emerging as a figurehead of the revolution.

=== 2005–2013 ===
In 2005 Petro Cherniavsky joined the band.

On September 22, 2005, Okean Elzy released their new album Gloria. After that the band went on tour (30 cities in Ukraine and 10 in Russia) with an audio crew consisting of Sergey Kamenev, Alexandr Kostin, Yurii Barybin and Vyacheslav Lavrinenko.

In September 2005, Vakarchuk became the UN's Ambassador of Good Will. Also, in September Okean Elzy started a joint campaign with IOM and MTV Europe Foundation, fighting human trafficking. Svyatoslav Vakarchuk, as UN's Ambassador of Goodwill for 2006, held meetings with students at Ukrainian and Polish universities. Vakarchuk is involved in a campaign to support reading. The project's aim is to draw the attention of young people to books and help fight illiteracy.

In November 2006, Okean Elzy visited Kosovo, where musicians had a concert for peacemakers from Ukraine, Poland, Germany, United States and other countries, which included an international contingent of peacemakers.

During the Football World Cup 2006 in Germany, Okean Elzy actively supported the Ukrainian national team and cheered the fans with their songs. The last song of the band called Veseli, brate, chasy nastaly... ("Oh, brother, merry times came...") made a huge splash in Ukraine. The song and the video were released as a single and all profits were donated to the child care center treating AIDS. Charity activities play a major role in OE's life.

In April 2006 OE went on tour, which includes Chicago, New York City and Toronto, where thousands sang along to their songs.

On April 25, 2007, Okean Elzy released a new album, Mira ("Measure"). After that the band went on a huge nationwide tour. During the month they held concerts in 27 Ukrainian cities. All of the concerts were held in large cities, mostly at stadiums and sporting arenas. The concerts were attended by more than 120,000 fans, which set a record for the group. For the two Kyiv concerts, the attendance was about 24,000 total. In the history of Ukraine only Okean Elzy "for the second time" (after the Gloria tour) gathered so many people in one place in such a short time.

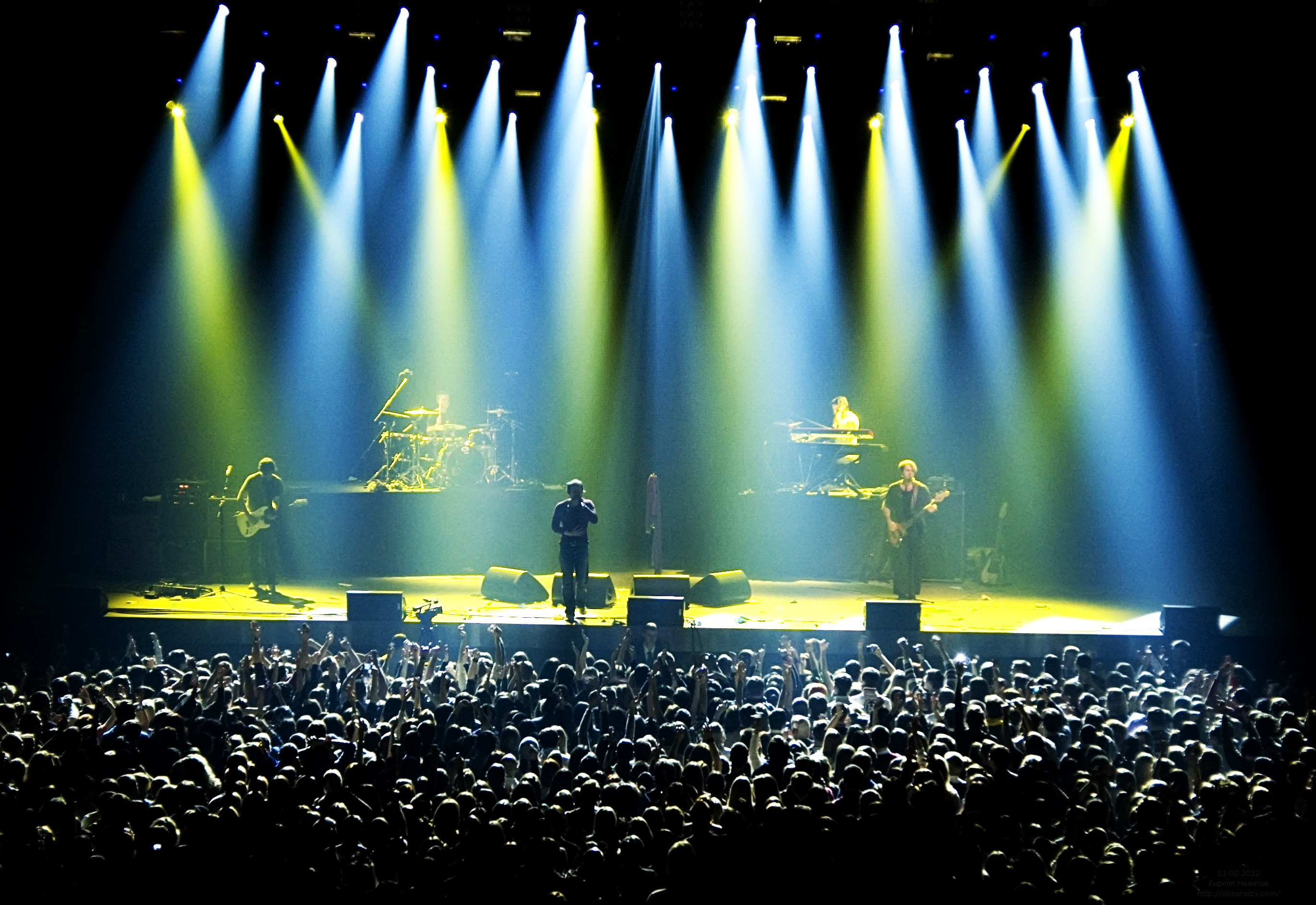
Okean Elzy performing in February 2012

In 2010 Okean Elzy went on their Dolce Vita Tour, in support of their latest album Dolce Vita, which included over one hundred concerts in Russia, Ukraine, Belarus, Europe and North America.

In December 2013 the band performed during the Euromaidan protests.

In 2013, Okean Elzy announced on their website a new album and new tour through Ukraine.

=== 2014–2017 ===
On June 21, 2014, for their 20th anniversary, Okean Elzy performed in front of 70,000 fans in Kyiv at NSC Olimpiyskiy. This concert was the largest in Ukrainian history.

Since the 2014 Russian annexation of Crimea the band stopped performing in Russia, being one of the few Ukrainian bands to do so.

In 2016, the most famous Ukrainian rock band Okean Elzy hits the road for a two-year-long World tour to support its ninth studio album Bez mezh ("Without limits").

=== 2018–2023 ===
On 24 August 2018 the band gathered around 100,000 fans at its concert at NSC Olimpiyskiy dedicated to Ukraine's independence day.

On 7 March 2022, during the Russian invasion of Ukraine, Okean Elzy's lead singer Vakarchuk joined the territorial defense battalion of Lviv Oblast.

=== 2024–present ===
On March 14, 2024, Svyatoslav Vakarchuk announced that Okean Elzy plan to release their first album in English. The same album is also planned to be released in Ukrainian in fall of 2024, on the band's 30th anniversary. 13 April 2024 marks the first date of their European tour, starting in Malmö, Sweden, then followed by Gothenburg, Brussels and the UK. On September 20, 2024, Okean Elzy released its tenth album Toi den ("That day").

To celebrate its 30th anniversary, the Okean Elzy organized five concerts in October 2024 in Kyiv. The air alarm interrupted the last show, so they continued to perform while sheltering in the subway at the Palats Sportu station.

== Musical style ==
The band's musical style is close to pop rock with elements of britpop. Its original sound owes a lot to lyrical melody and Vakarchuk's raspy voice.

== Collaborations ==
A number of O.E.'s performances featured famous Ukrainian folk singer Nina Matviyenko.

== Band members ==
=== Current members ===
- Svyatoslav Vakarchuk—lead vocals (1994–present)
- Denys Hlinin—drums, percussion (1994–present)
- Denys Dudko—bass, acoustic guitar, backing vocals (2004–present)
- Miloš Jelić—piano, synthesizers, backing vocals (2004–present)
- Vladimir Opsenica—guitars, backing vocals (unofficial 2013–2014; 2014–2021)

=== Former members ===
- Yuri Khustochka—bass guitar, backing vocals (1994–2004; one-off shows in 2013 and 2014)
- Dmytro Shurov—piano, synthesizers, backing vocals (unofficial 2000–2001; 2001–2004; one-off shows in 2013 and 2014)
- Pavlo Hudimov—guitars, mandolin, backing vocals (1994–2005; one-off shows in 2013 and 2014)
- Petro Chernyavsky—guitars, backing vocals (2005–2013)

== Discography ==
=== Studio albums ===
- Tam, de nas nema (Там, де нас нема - There, Where We Aren't) (1998)
- Ya na nebi buv (Я на небі був - I Was In Heaven) (2000)
- Model (Модель) (2001)
- Supersymetriya (Суперсиметрія - Supersymmetry) (2003)
- Gloria (2005)
- Mira (Міра - Measure) (2007)
- Dolce Vita (2010)
- Zemlya (Note: Also transliterated as Zemlia) (Земля - The Land) (2013)
- Naikrashche (Найкраще - The Best) (2014)
- Bez mezh (Без меж - Without Limits) (2016)
- Toi den (Note: Also transliterated as Toy den) (Той день - That day) (2024)
- Lighthouse (2024)

=== Acoustic albums ===
- 2003 - Tviy format (Your format)

"Dyakuyu tobi (Дякую тобі)"
Recording of the song Dyakuyu, released in honour of the band's 10th anniversary

=== Singles ===
- 1996 - "Budynok zi skla" ("House of glass")
- 2002 - "Kholodno" ("It is cold")
- 2004 - "Dyakuyu!" ("Thank You!")
- 2006 - "Veseli, brate, chasy nastaly..." ("Oh, brother, merry times have come...")
- 2009 - "Ya tak khochu..." ("I want so much to...")
- 2013 - "Obiymy" ("Embrace")
- 2015 - "Ne tvoya viyna" ("Not your war")
- 2015 - "Zhyttya pochynayet'sya znov" ("Life begins again")
- 2015 - "Myt" ("Moment")
- 2016 - "Ne ydy" ("Don't go")
- 2017 - "Sontse (Radio edition)" ("Sun" (Radio edition))
- 2018 - "Bez tebe" ("Without you")
- 2018 - "V nebo zhene" ("It hie to the sky")
- 2018 - "Skilky nas" ("How many of us")
- 2019 - "Choven" ("Boat")
- 2019 - "Pereval" ("Pass"; for the soundtrack of "The Rising Hawk")
- 2020 - "Koly my stanem soboyu" ("When we will become ourselves")
- 2020 - "Obiymy (Remix)" ("Embrace" (Remix))
- 2020 - "Trymay" ("Hold on")
- 2021 - "#Безтебемененема" ("Without you there is no me")
- 2021 - "Krayina ditey" (with Alyona Alyona) («Країна дітей» "Country of children")
- 2021 - "Misto vesny" (with Odyn v kanoe) («Місто весни» "City of Spring")
- 2021 - "Peremoha" (with Kalush) («Перемога» "Victory")
- 2022 - "Vesna" ("Spring")
- 2022 - "Misto Marii" ("City of Mary")
- 2022 - "Kvity minnykh zon" ("Flowers of minefields")
- 2022 - "Vesna Mirabeau"
- 2024 - "Vidpovid" ("Answer")
- 2024 - "Voices Are Rising"
- 2024 - "Toi den" (with Yaktak, Kola, Shumei, Jerry Heil) ("That day")
- 2024 - "Lighthouse" (with John Rzeznik)
- 2024 - "Mukachevo"

=== Compilations ===
- 2006 - 1221 ("Best of" collection)
- 2007 - Vybrane... (Selected...)
- 2010 - The Best Of

=== Solo projects of Svyatoslav Vakarchuk ===
- 2008 - Vnochi ("At night")
- 2011 - Briussel ("Brussels")
- 2021 - Oranzhereya ("Greenhouse")

== Videography ==
=== Music videos ===
- Tam, de nas nema
- Sosny
- Na linii vohniu
- Vidpusty
- 911
- Kvitka
- Ya do tebe
- Vyshche neba
- Drug
- Kholodno
- Kishka
- Diakuyu
- Bez boyu
- Dlia tebe
- Ne pytay
- Vidchuvayu
- Zeleni ochi
- Ya tak khochu
- Bilshe dlia nas
- Obiymy
- Striliay
- Rendez-vous

=== Film soundtracks ===
- Brother 2 (Russia, 2000)
- Love and Other Nightmares (Russia, 2001)
- War (Russia, 2002)
