= 2010 Moldovan parliamentary election =

- 28 November 2010
- All 101 seats in Parliament; 51 seats needed for a majority
- Turnout: 61.64% (▲2.57pp)
Party	Leader	Vote %	Seats	+/–
PCRM	Vladimir Voronin	39.34	42	−6
PLDM	Vlad Filat	29.42	32	+14
PDM	Marian Lupu	12.70	15	+2
PL	Mihai Ghimpu	9.96	12	−3
This lists parties that won seats. See the complete results below.
Prime Minister before	Prime Minister after
Vlad Filat; PLDM	Vlad Filat; PLDM
Cabinet before	Cabinet after
First Filat Cabinet; PLDM–PL–PDM–AMN	Second Filat Cabinet; PLDM–PDM–PL

Parliamentary elections were held in Moldova on 28 November 2010 after parliamentary vote failed to elect a President for the second time in late 2009.

== Background ==
After the constitutional referendum failed to meet the 33% turnout required to validate the results, the Constitutional Court of Moldova ruled that acting president of Moldova, Mihai Ghimpu had to dissolve the parliament and hold new elections. Ghimpu then announced that the parliament would be dissolved on 28 September 2010 and new elections would be held on 28 November 2010.

== Electoral system ==
The electoral threshold varied for different organizations; for electoral blocs of three or more parties it was 9%; for blocs of two parties it was 7%, and for individual parties it was 4%. Individual candidates could also run, but needed to receive at least 2% of the vote to win a seat. A total of 39 contestants; 20 political parties and 19 independent candidates. The Constitution states that the Parliament must elect the President with a majority of at least 61 votes (from a total of 101). After two failed attempts the Parliament must be dissolved and the interim president must set the date for a new parliamentary election.

== Parties and coalitions ==
Below is a list of the main parties and electoral blocs which contested the election:

Party	Lead candidate	Main ideology	Last election		Government
Party	Lead candidate	Main ideology	Vote %	Seats	Government
PCRM	Vladimir Voronin	Communism	44.7%	48	Opposition
PLDM	Vlad Filat	Liberal conservatism	16.6%	18	Coalition government
PL	Mihai Ghimpu	Conservative liberalism	14.7%	15	Coalition government
PDM	Marian Lupu	Social Democracy	12.5%	13	Coalition government
AMN	Serafim Urechean	Social liberalism	7.4%	7	Coalition government

== Campaign ==
The Liberal Democratic Party of Moldova (PLDM), Democratic Party of Moldova (PDM), and the Liberal Party (PL) formed the Alliance for European Integration (AIE) in a grand coalition against the Party of Communists of the Republic of Moldova (PCRM). The Alliance sought integration into the European Union (EU).

== Opinion polls ==
According to the Chișinău-based Institute of Marketing and Polls IMAS-INC, a poll during the period of July 26-August 12 showed 42% of respondents trusted PLDM, 35% trusted PCRM, 35% - PDM and 30% - the PL.

Date	Institute	Party				
Date	Institute	PCRM	PLDM	PDM	PL	AMN
15 April–3 May 2010	IMAS	28%	16.5%	8.6%	4.9%	—N/a
4 November 2010	CBS-AXA	39%	21%	19%	13%	2%
12 November 2010	Vox Populi	35.3%	19.8%	12.5%	11%	6.5%
16 November 2010	BPO	37.2%	31.1%	14.4%	12.5%	0.8%
18 November 2010	AVA.MD	54.3%	22.6%	9.7%	8.6%	1%
19 November 2010	CBS-AXA	35%	28%	18%	12%	2%
22 November 2010	Vox Populi-II	32.1%	22.1%	12.1%	10.9%	7%

=== Exit polls ===
There were two exit polls made for two TV stations, both failing to predict the outcome within the margin of error:

Institute	Margin of error	% of seats				
Institute	Margin of error	PCRM	PLDM	PDM	PL	AMN
IRES poll (made for Publika TV)	±1%	26% (29)	34.4% (37)	15.1% (17)	15.6% (18)	3.1% (0)
CBS AXA poll (made for Prime TV)	<2%	33.8% (37)	32.2% (35)	14.1% (17)	10.2% (12)	3% (0)

== Results ==
Election map showing the results by administrative divisions of Moldova.

Results of the election, showing vote strength by commune.

The Communists (PCRM) won 42 seats, while the Liberal Democrats (PLDM) won 32, the Democratic Party (PDM) 15, and the Liberals (PL) 12. This gave the Alliance for European Integration (AEI) 59 seats, two short of the 61 needed to elect a President. The result thus maintained the status quo following the contemporaneous constitutional deadlock. Observers from the Organization for Security and Co-operation in Europe and the Council of Europe lauded the election, with the head of the Parliamentary Assembly delegation of OSCE, Tonino Picula, saying "These elections reflected the will of the people."

Party	Votes	%	Seats	+/–
Party of Communists	677,069	39.34	42	–6
Liberal Democratic Party	506,253	29.42	32	+14
Democratic Party	218,620	12.70	15	+2
Liberal Party	171,336	9.96	12	–3
Our Moldova Alliance	35,289	2.05	0	–7
European Action Movement	21,049	1.22	0	New
Humanist Party	15,494	0.90	0	New
National Liberal Party	10,938	0.64	0	New
Social Democratic Party	10,156	0.59	0	0
Christian-Democratic People's Party	9,038	0.53	0	0
United Moldova Party	8,238	0.48	0	New
For the Nation and Country Party	4,819	0.28	0	New
Social-Political Movement of the Roma	2,394	0.14	0	New
Conservative Party	2,089	0.12	0	New
Popular Republican Party	1,997	0.12	0	New
Republican Party of Moldova	1,763	0.10	0	New
Equality	1,781	0.10	0	New
Patriots of Moldova	1,580	0.09	0	New
Ecologist Party of Moldova "Green Alliance"	1,385	0.08	0	0
Labour Party	873	0.05	0	New
Independents	18,832	1.09	0	New
Total	1,720,993	100.00	101	0
Valid votes	1,720,993	99.31		
Invalid/blank votes	11,907	0.69		
Total votes	1,732,900	100.00		
Registered voters/turnout	2,811,469	61.64		
Source: eDemocracy

=== By district ===
#	District	Registered	Voted	Turnout	Valid	PCRM	PLDM	PL	PD	AMN	MAE	PUM	PNL
1	Chișinău			67.62%		40.20%	28.44%	16.04%	8.18%	1.55%	0.39%	0.60%	0.48%
2	Bălți			58.70%		56.90%	18.33%	4.93%	13.70%	1.38%	0.24%	0.88%	0.31%
3	Gagauzia			52.66%		59.99%	6.28%	0.52%	15.67%	0.68%	0.27%	6.52%	0.32%
4	Anenii Noi			60.14%		44.11%	31.04%	7.63%	10.21%	1.37%	1.76%	0.75%	0.43%
5	Basarabeasca			73.46%		50.21%	25.57%	2.67%	12.88%	2.74%	0.56%	1.20%	0.21%
6	Briceni			58.97%		47.25%	17.44%	4.30%	21.21%	4.00%	0.83%	0.63%	0.52%
7	Cahul			57.84%		37.77%	33.05%	9.03%	11.65%	1.06%	2.25%	0.60%	0.68%
8	Cantemir			57.97%		34.36%	34.80%	7.76%	11.99%	1.03%	5.75%	0.74%	0.99%
9	Călărași			56.07%		25.81%	35.85%	16.24%	12.31%	3.76%	1.07%	0.68%	0.65%
10	Căușeni			57.76%		41.17%	32.13%	6.43%	12.12%	0.96%	2.14%	0.68%	0.54%
11	Cimișlia			57.24%		38.91%	33.67%	6.97%	15.44%	0.39%	1.03%	0.56%	0.51%
12	Criuleni			62.75%		33.77%	33.30%	11.05%	11.28%	2.90%	2.74%	0.75%	0.63%
13	Dondușeni			65.33%		53.99%	19.59%	4.26%	14.32%	1.23%	1.27%	0.98%	0.67%
14	Drochia			59.00%		44.58%	28.21%	4.21%	13.83%	2.33%	0.65%	1.21%	0.43%
15	Dubăsari			59.10%		62.34%	16.29%	5.52%	9.10%	1.04%	2.73%	0.51%	0.29%
16	Edineț			61.04%		52.54%	12.80%	3.72%	21.62%	3.73%	1.58%	0.76%	0.52%
17	Fălești			57.62%		47.59%	25.82%	3.72%	15.81%	2.54%	0.67%	0.89%	0.66%
18	Florești			60.63%		47.60%	23.11%	4.16%	17.25%	2.66%	1.15%	0.61%	0.55%
19	Glodeni			57.25%		43.64%	24.63%	4.37%	17.03%	3.40%	1.13%	1.06%	0.57%
20	Hîncești			56.17%		23.24%	50.96%	6.84%	13.73%	0.85%	0.63%	0.56%	0.60%
21	Ialoveni			62.39%		23.49%	42.11%	16.36%	11.11%	2.34%	0.26%	0.37%	0.55%
22	Leova			53.95%		35.80%	28.72%	5.18%	18.81%	0.52%	5.97%	0.75%	0.90%
23	Nisporeni			60.63%		19.00%	37.21%	14.98%	18.78%	4.23%	2.49%	0.29%	0.50%
24	Ocnița			63.44%		60.11%	12.81%	2.75%	16.24%	3.51%	0.49%	0.67%	0.47%
25	Orhei			61.05%		24.22%	37.48%	9.82%	17.04%	4.47%	1.32%	0.65%	0.87%
26	Rezina			61.98%		39.40%	27.81%	7.73%	14.67%	1.08%	3.44%	0.76%	0.73%
27	Rîșcani			58.62%		47.73%	23.24%	5.84%	14.26%	2.56%	1.64%	1.28%	0.57%
28	Sîngerei			57.37%		38.33%	28.66%	5.40%	19.23%	2.01%	2.01%	0.84%	0.60%
29	Soroca			60.27%		45.42%	22.36%	5.84%	14.58%	4.71%	2.11%	0.85%	0.69%
30	Strășeni			58.16%		26.42%	41.15%	12.55%	11.29%	2.03%	2.01%	0.63%	0.73%
31	Șoldănești			60.94%		40.93%	31.75%	6.22%	12.50%	1.74%	2.05%	0.55%	0.62%
32	Ștefan Vodă			56.21%		33.03%	38.79%	7.46%	11.52%	2.61%	0.88%	1.07%	0.44%
33	Taraclia			60.81%		69.80%	6.18%	1.10%	11.12%	1.31%	0.10%	2.48%	0.30%
34	Telenești			61.77%		22.42%	49.14%	7.76%	14.49%	0.35%	1.89%	0.62%	0.96%
35	Ungheni			58.44%		42.35%	26.27%	7.05%	14.70%	3.67%	1.50%	0.73%	0.65%
36	Diplomatic missions			89.02%		6.88%	48.88%	25.44%	8.92%	1.36%	1.02%	0.33%	2.71%
Total				61.72%		39.32%	29.38%	9.96%	12.72%	2.05%	1.22%	0.90%'	0.64%
Source: eDemocracy

== Aftermath ==
Even though the Alliance for European Integration did not get the supermajority needed to elect the president, the leaders of the three parties of the alliance pledged a new coalition agreement on 30 December. Their new cabinet was installed on 14 January 2011, when an investiture vote took place in parliament.

Moldova's highest court ruled on 8 February 2011 that the government could stay in place without early elections even if they were still unable to elect a new president.

== Elected MPs ==
The list of deputies elected:

Party of Communists	Liberal Democratic Party	Democratic Party	Liberal Party
1. Vladimir Voronin; 2. Zinaida Greceanîi; 3. Iurie Muntean; 4. Maria Postoico; 5. Mark Tkachuk; 6. Igor Dodon; 7. Vadim Mișin; 8. Vladimir Vitiuc; 9. Irina Vlah; 10. Grigore Petrenco; 11. Galina Balmoș; 12. Anatolie Zagorodnîi; 13. Violeta Ivanov; 14. Vasilii Sova; 15. Serghei Sârbu; 16. Oxana Domenti; 17. Zinaida Chistruga; 18. Miron Gagauz; 19. Vasilii Panciuc; 20. Alla Mironic; 21. Alexandr Bannicov; 22. Mihail Poleanschi; 23. Sergiu Stati; 24. Zurab Todua; 25. Anatolie Gorilă; 26. Elena Bodnarenco; 27. Constantin Starîș; 28. Veaceslav Bondari; 29. Veronica Abramciuc; 30. Oleg Reidman; 31. Eduard Mușuc; 32. Vladimir Eremciuc; 33. Oleg Garizan; 34. Oleg Babenco; 35. Victor Mîndru; 36. Serghei Filipov; 37. Artur Reșetnicov; 38. Inna Șupac; 39. Tatiana Botnariuc; 40. Alexandr Petcov; 41. Gheorghe Popa; 42. Gheorghe Anghel	1. Vladimir Filat; 2. Alexandru Tănase; 3. Mihai Godea; 4. Liliana Palihovici; 5. Iurie Leancă; 6. Grigore Belostecinic; 7. Vladimir Hotineanu; 8. Nicolae Juravschi; 9. Iurie Țap; 10. Lilia Bolocan; 11. Valeriu Ghilețchi; 12. Mihail Șleahtițchi; 13. Angela Agache; 14. Ion Balan; 15. Tudor Deliu; 16. Veaceslav Ioniță; 17. Valeriu Streleț; 18. Simion Furdui; 19. Chiril Lucinschi; 20. George Mocanu; 21. Grigore Cobzac; 22. Alexandru Cimbriciuc; 23. Ion Butmălai; 24. Ghenadie Ciobanu; 25. Nicolae Olaru; 26. Ivan Ionaș; 27. Nae-Simion Pleșca; 28. Anatolie Dimitriu; 29. Maria Ciobanu; 30. Petru Vlah; 31. Andrei Vacarciuc; 32. Petru Stirbate	1. Marian Lupu; 2. Vladimir Plahotniuc; 3. Valeriu Lazăr; 4. Igor Corman; 5. Dumitru Diacov; 6. Marcel Răducan; 7. Andrian Candu; 8. Valentina Buliga; 9. Pavel Filip; 10. Vasile Botnari; 11. Alexandr Stoianoglo; 12. Raisa Apolschii; 13. Iurie Bolboceanu; 14. Valeriu Guma; 15. Anatolie Ghilaş	1. Mihai Ghimpu; 2. Anatolie Șalaru; 3. Corina Fusu; 4. Ion Hadârcă; 5. Valeriu Munteanu; 6. Oleg Bodrug; 7. Boris Vieru; 8. Vladimir Lupan; 9. Victor Popa; 10. Vadim Cojocaru; 11. Ana Guțu; 12. Gheorghe Brega
