= 2010 Moldovan constitutional referendum =

- 5 September 2010
- Would you agree with the Constitutional amendment, which would allow the election of the President of the Republic of Moldova by the entire population?
- Outcome: Proposal failed as voter turnout was below 33%

Results
Choice	Votes	%
Yes	707,468	87.83%
No	97,999	12.17%
Valid votes	805,467	98.42%
Invalid or blank votes	12,962	1.58%
Total votes	818,429	100.00%
Registered voters/turnout	2,701,918	30.29%
- Results by county

A nationwide referendum was held in Moldova on 5 September 2010 on whether or not the country should amend the Constitution of Moldova to return to direct popular election of the president. Since 2001, the president had been indirectly elected by Parliament, with a supermajority of 61 seats (three-fifths of the membership) required for election. The voters are asked to answer the following question: "Would you agree with the Constitutional amendment, which would allow the election of the President of the Republic of Moldova by the entire population?" Voters chose one of the proposed options: "Yes (for)" or "No (against)". Of those who had cast their vote, 87.83% chose "Yes". However, the referendum did not pass because only 30.29% of voters turned out, short of the necessary 33% for the referendum to be considered valid.

== Background ==
As the constitution cannot be changed by parliamentary vote against the will of the opposition Communist Party (PCRM), which holds enough seats to block any constitutional changes by parliamentary vote, the ruling coalition decided to bypass it by holding a referendum on the question.

The new Constitution was initially adopted by the Parliament by 50+1 votes. A national referendum was then approved by a simple majority in parliament for the people to express their opinion on the new Constitution.

The proposal also changed the name of the state language from "Moldovan" to "Romanian." According to Ghimpu, the Romanian language must be the official language of Moldova.

The Venice Commission of the Council of Europe reacted initially favorably to a proposed constitutional reform, in particular to revise the existing procedure of electing president of the republic. However, after a plenary meeting in March 2010, the Commission suggested to hold early parliamentary elections instead of conducting a constitutional referendum. The commission also stressed that the current parliament should be dissolved after adopting the proposal for constitutional reform and that this proposal should take effect for the next parliament.

On 9 March 2010, the four leaders of the Alliance for European Integration (AEI) decided to organize the referendum before 16 June 2010 in order to adopt the 2010 constitution. Ghimpu stated that he was not going to dissolve the Parliament in case of defeat in September 2010.

The opposition Party of Communists of the Republic of Moldova (PCRM) suggested to lower the validity threshold for future presidential elections from 61 to 51, a simple majority. However, the communists insisted that this change would be in force only after the next parliamentary elections, whereas the ruling coalition wanted to introduce the changes before such elections. After negotiations with the communists have failed, the AEI used its simple majority advantage in the parliament on 7 July 2010 to pass the referendum proposal. In addition, the electoral code was amended by lowering the necessary voter turnout from 60% to 33%, reducing the effectiveness of a boycott

The PCRM together with several other parties urged the voters to boycott the referendum, hoping to push the turnout below the 33% necessary for validation of the referendum's result.

Moldovan citizens living abroad were allowed to participate in the referendum. The deputy prime minister, Iurie Leancă, said that 130,000 ballot papers were requested for the 78 polling stations which opened abroad, 1,600 for each of them.

== Opinion polls ==
According to the Chişinău-based Institute of Marketing and Polls IMAS-INC, a poll held between July 26 and August 12 showed that 91% of the people will vote "yes" (for) and that about 73% of Moldova's population was ready to take part in the referendum.

== Participants ==
Political parties were not registered as electoral contestants in the referendum, but they could register as participants in the referendum, with the Central Election Commission of Moldova having required them to declare their position via two options: “yes (for)” or “no (against)”.

YES
- Democratic Party of Moldova (AIE)
- Party Alliance Our Moldova (AIE)
- Liberal Party (AIE)
- Liberal Democratic Party of Moldova (AIE)
- European Action Movement
- Republican Popular Party
- National Liberal Party
- Republican Party of Moldova
- Ecologist Party of Moldova "Green Alliance"
- For the Nation and Country Party
- Humanist Party of Moldova
- Social-Political Movement of the Roma
- Romanian National Party
- Labor Party of Moldova
- United Moldova Party
- Socialist Party of Moldova
- Centrist Union of Moldova
NO
- Party of Communists (boycotted)
- Republican Socio-Political Movement "Equality" (boycotted)
- Christian-Democratic People's Party
- Party of Socialists of Moldova "Motherland" (boycotted)
- Conservative Party
- New Force Social-Political Movement
- Moldovan Patriots Party
- Social Democratic Party (boycotted)

== Conduct ==
"The Council of Europe and a European Union delegation financed 20 teams of observers on behalf of NGOs from Moldova, which went abroad. At the same time, the Council of Europe and the EU sent at least 20 observers to monitor the holding of the referendum in the country," Iurie Leancă said.

The head of the observer mission from the Parliamentary Assembly of the Council of Europe, Andreas Gross, praised the referendum as being well organised and corresponding to democratic standards.

== Results ==
Prime Minister Vlad Filat suggested that the referendum's failure was due not only to the boycott called by the Communists, but also to splits within the governing alliance.

Choice	Votes	%
For	707,468	87.83
Against	97,999	12.17
Total	805,467	100.00
Valid votes	805,467	98.42
Invalid/blank votes	12,962	1.58
Total votes	818,429	100.00
Registered voters/turnout	2,701,918	30.29
Source: eDemocracy

== Aftermath ==
After the referendum failed to meet the 33% turnout required to validate the results, the Alliance for European Integration announced that it would consult the Constitutional Court of Moldova on dissolving Parliament and holding new elections. After the Constitutional court has confirmed the need for new elections, these were scheduled for 28 November 2010. Finally, the Constitutional Court on 4 March 2016 declared that the 2000 constitutional revision that led to the president being indirectly elected by Parliament was unconstitutional, hence the popular presidential election was reinstated.

== See also ==
- Commission for constitutional reform in Moldova
