= Vitalie Nagacevschi =

Moldovan politician (born 1965)

Member of the Moldovan Parliament
- In office 22 April 2009 – 16 July 2010
- Succeeded by: Grigore Cobzac
- Parliamentary group: Liberal Democratic Party

Personal details
- Born: Sîngerei, Moldavian SSR, Soviet Union
- Party: Liberal Democratic Party; Alliance for European Integration (2009–present)

Vitalie Nagacevschi (born 28 January 1965) is a Moldovan politician.

== Biography ==
He has been a member of the Parliament of Moldova since 2009.
