= Maria Ciobanu (politician) =

Moldovan teacher and education official

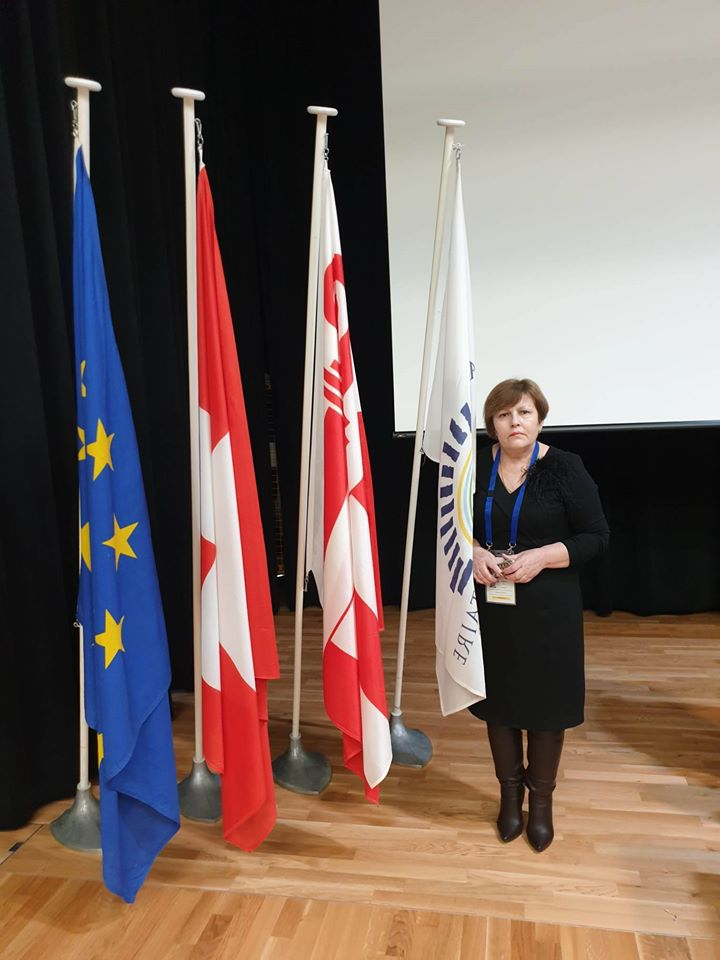
- Ciobanu in 2019

Member of the Moldovan Parliament
- In office 23 February 2015 – 23 July 2021
- Preceded by: Natalia Gherman
- Parliamentary group: Liberal Democratic Party; Dignity and Truth Platform
- In office 28 December 2010 – 9 December 2014
- Parliamentary group: Liberal Democratic Party

Personal details
- Born: 10 March 1953 (age 73) Găureni, Moldavian SSR, Soviet Union
- Party: Liberal Democratic Party of Moldova
- Other political affiliations: Alliance for European Integration (2010-2013); Pro-European Coalition (2013–2014)
- Education: Ion Creangă Pedagogical State University
- Occupation: Professor, politician

Maria Ciobanu (born 10 March 1953) is a teacher and official in the field of education in the Republic of Moldova, deputy to the Parliament of the Republic of Moldova on the lists of the Liberal Democratic Party of Moldova since 2010.

== Biography ==
Maria Ciobanu was born on 10 March 1953 in Găureni, Nisporeni, Moldavian SSR. Between 1972-1977 he studied at the "Ion Creangă" State Pedagogical University of Chișinău, after which he worked for two years as a teacher at the middle school in the village of Grozești and then as a deputy director at the middle school in the village of Selişte. Between 1982 and 1987 he was a school inspector at Nisporeni General Directorate for Education, Youth and Sport. Then, for one year, he was a teacher at Nisporeni's No. 1 middle school. From 1988 until 1991 Maria Ciobanu worked as Deputy Director of the Nisporeni Gymnasium, and from 1992-1994 returned to Nisporeni General Directorate for Education, Youth and Sports as General Manager. From 1994 to 2007 she was a teacher at the "Boris Cazacu" High School in Nisporeni, and for the period 2007 - 2010 she returned to the General Directorate of Education, Youth and Sports of Nisporeni as general manager.

== Honours ==
On 25 November 2014 Maria Ciobanu was awarded by president of Romania Traian Băsescu with the National Order of Faithful Service, in rank of officer.
