= 2013 Moldovan government crisis =

The 2013 Moldovan government crisis was a governmental crisis that took place in the Republic of Moldova. It started on 8 March 2013, after the Prime Minister Vlad Filat was dismissed by motion of censure of the Parliament. It ended on 30 May 2013, when Iurie Leancă's cabinet received a successful vote of confidence.

== Background ==
The government coalition Alliance for European Integration, composed by Liberal Democratic Party of Moldova (PLDM), Democratic Party (PD) and Liberal Party (PL), entered in an internal conflict. The President of the Parliament and PD leader, Marian Lupu accused Vlad Filat and his government for corruption, although in PL, someone sustained Filat, and the other ones sustained Lupu. The alliance was dissolved.

== Government falling ==
Filat and his government were dismissed on 8 March 2013, after a parliamentary motion of censure against the cabinet, initiated by the Party of the Communists (PCRM). PD, PL and PCRM deputies voted for the motion, while PLDM and independents voted against it. President Nicolae Timofti asked Filat to maintain the function as Acting, until a new government is formed.

== Filat's designation ==
Timofti designated Filat to form his third cabinet. The Prime Minister designate started to negotiate with the former political partners in the European Integration Alliance.
