= Ion Balan =

Moldovan politician (born 1962)

Member of the Moldovan Parliament
- In office 23 February 2015 – 9 March 2019
- Preceded by: Grigore Belostecinic
- Parliamentary group: Liberal Democratic Party; Democratic Party
- In office 28 August 2009 – 9 December 2014
- Parliamentary group: Liberal Democratic Party

Personal details
- Born: 1 May 1962 (age 63) Lingura
- Party: Liberal Democratic Party; Alliance for European Integration (2009–present)
- Children: 4

Ion Balan (born May 1, 1962) is a Moldovan politician, deputy in the Parliament of the Republic of Moldova since 2009.

== Biography ==
Since 1989, he has been a district counselor in Cantemir. Since 2007, he became a member, then a deputy chairman of the LDPM. Together with his brother Vasile, he is the founder of the church in his home town.

== Distinctions and orders ==
- 2000 - The "Civic Merit" Medal
- 2006 - Order of the 2nd Grade of the "Paisie Velicicovski" for the work for the good of the Orthodox Church in Moldova.
