= Ivan Ionaș =

Moldovan politician (1956–2014)

Member of the Moldovan Parliament
- In office 16 March 2010 – 8 November 2014
- Preceded by: Vladimir Filat
- Parliamentary group: Liberal Democratic Party

Personal details
- Born: 20 December 1956 Cărpineni, Moldavian SSR, Soviet Union
- Died: 8 November 2014 (aged 57) Chișinău, Moldova
- Party: Liberal Democratic Party; Alliance for European Integration (2009–2013); Pro-European Coalition (2013-2014)
- Spouse: Alexandra Ionaș
- Education: Technical University of Moldova

Ivan Ionaș (20 December 1956 – 8 November 2014) was a Moldovan politician and a member of the Moldovan Parliament between 2010 and 2014.

== Biography ==
Ionas carried out his compulsory military service in the Soviet army from 1976 until 1978. He graduated from the Technical University of Moldova in 1989. He had been a member of the Parliament of Moldova since 2010. He died in Chișinău on 8 November 2014.
