= Grigore Cobzac =

Moldovan politician (born 1959)

Member of the Moldovan Parliament
- In office 9 December 2014 – 9 March 2019
- Parliamentary group: Liberal Democratic Party
- In office 17 August 2010 – 30 September 2011
- Preceded by: Vitalie Nagacevschi
- Succeeded by: Iurie Toma
- Parliamentary group: Liberal Democratic Party

President of the Hîncești District
- In office 30 September 2011 – 9 December 2014
- Succeeded by: Ghenadie Buza

Personal details
- Born: 31 January 1959 (age 67) Hâncești
- Party: Liberal Democratic Party; Alliance for European Integration (2010–present)

Grigore Cobzac (born 31 January 1959) is a politician from Moldova who since December 2014 has been deputy to the Parliament of the Republic of Moldova for the XXth legislature (2014–2018) in the faction of the Liberal Democratic Party of Moldova (LDPM). He is a member of the parliamentary commission for public administration, regional development, environment and climate change.

He was also a deputy in the previous legislature between 2010 and 2011, but after being elected president of the Hîncești District, he gave up the mandate of deputy.

In the November 2014 parliamentary elections from the Republic of Moldova, he ran for 12th place on the list of candidates for the PLDM, thus obtaining the mandate of deputy in the Parliament of the Republic of Moldova in the XXth legislature.

After being elected again as a deputy in January 2015, he gave up the position of president of Hîncești District in favor of the deputy in Parliament.
