= Grigore Belostecinic =

Moldovan politician (born 1960)

Grigore Belostecinic OR

Rector of the Academy of Economic Studies of Moldova
- In office 2001 – 13 April 2022
- Succeeded by: Alexandru Stratan

Member of the Moldovan Parliament
- In office 9 December 2014 – 20 February 2015
- Succeeded by: Aliona Goța
- Parliamentary group: Liberal Democratic Party
- In office 28 December 2010 – 11 February 2011
- Succeeded by: Iurie Apostolachi
- Parliamentary group: Liberal Democratic Party

Personal details
- Born: 7 January 1960 (age 66) Voinova, Moldavian SSR, Soviet Union
- Party: Liberal Democratic Party; Alliance for European Integration (2010–present)

Grigore Belostecinic (born 7 January 1960) is a politician from Moldova. He served as a member of the Parliament of Moldova and rector of the Academy of Economic Studies of Moldova.
