= 2011 Moldovan local elections =

Local elections were held in Moldova on 5 June 2011, with a runoff for mayors two weeks later. In one of the most high-profile races, Dorin Chirtoacă was reelected as mayor of Chişinău in a very close run-off election.

== Results ==
Results of Moldovan local elections of 5 June 2011
Parties and coalitions	District and municipality councils	%	Places	City and village councils	%	Places	Mayors	%
Democratic Party of Moldova	212,504	15,41%	226	209,284	18,84%	2263	220	24,50%
Party of Communists of the Republic of Moldova	508,344	36,86%	434	327,747	29,50%	3441	203	22,61%
Socialist Party of Moldova	108	0,01%	—	51	0,00%	—	—	—
Partidul Legii și Dreptății	569	0,04%	—	197	0,02%	2	—	—
Christian-Democratic People's Party	16,053	1,16%	5	12,389	1,12%	75	6	0,67%
Liberal Party	223,268	16,19%	130	130,941	11,79%	1162	96	10,96%
Partidul pentru Unirea Moldovei	287	0,02%	—	38	0,00%	—	—	—
Social Democratic Party	12,426	0,90%	6	10,834	0,98%	58	2	0,22%
Party of Socialists of the Republic of Moldova	1,220	0,09%	—	1,847	0,17%	11	2	0,22%
Republican Socio-Political Movement Equality	3,301	0,22%	—	1,679	0,15%	6	—	—
Ecologist Party of Moldova "Green Alliance"	3,616	0,26%	2	4,117	0,37%	25	2	0,22%
Republican Party of Moldova	7,417	0,54%	5	8,488	0,76%	60	4	0,45%
Party of Labour	—	—	—	662	0,06%	6	—	—
Centrist Union of Moldova	634	0,05%	—	433	0,04%	3	—	—
European Party	—	—	—	385	0,03%	3	—	—
Democratic People's Party of Moldova	3,163	0,23%	—	2,469	0,22%	5	—	—
National Liberal Party	8,794	0,64%	1	7,262	0,65%	38	4	0,45%
Partidul "Pentru Neam și Țară"	2,947	0,21%	—	3,313	0,30%	18	2	0,22%
Liberal Democratic Party of Moldova	312,011	22,62%	300	281,667	25,35%	3039	287	31,96%
Partidul "Patrioții Moldovei"	858	0,06%	—	523	0,05%	2	—	—
Partidul "Casa Noastră — Moldova"	645	0,05%	—	3,936	0,35%	38	—	—
Blocul electoral "Forța a treia"	5,230	0,38%	2	6,919	0,62%	39	1	0,11%
Independents	55,994	4,06%	9	95,802	8,62%	336	69	7,68%
Total (percent %)	1,721,157	100,00%	1120	1,721,157	100,00%	10630	898	100,00%
Source: e-democracy.md
