= Mocan =

Mocan may refer to:

- Mocani, a Romanian shepherd subgroup from Transylvania, referred to as mocan in singular
- Mocán, a medieval Irish saint
- Mocan (surname)

== See also ==
- Mocanu, a surname
