= Veaceslav Ioniță =

Moldovan economist and politician (born 1973)

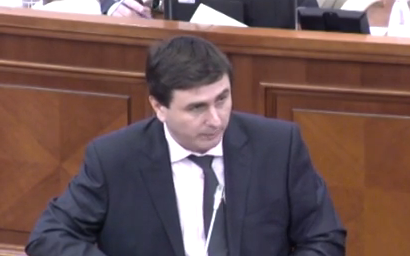
- Ioniță in 2014

Member of the Moldovan Parliament
- In office 5 May 2009 – 9 December 2014
- Parliamentary group: Liberal Democratic Party

Personal details
- Born: 4 October 1973 (age 52) Strășeni, Moldavian SSR, Soviet Union
- Party: Liberal Democratic Party; Alliance for European Integration (2009–present)
- Spouse: Irina

Veaceslav Ioniță (born 4 October 1973) is an economist and politician from Moldova.

== Life and career ==
Following attendance at the Strășeni general school, he graduated from the Academy of Economic Studies of Moldova (AESM). He is currently a lecturer in the Social Management Department of AESM and an expert on economic issues with the Institute for Development and Social Initiatives (IDIS Viitorul). He is also the author of numerous publications related to public administration, public finance, fiscal decentralization, etc. Veceslav Ioniță is an associate professor of economics and an expert on economic issues in Moldova. He has been a member of the Parliament of Moldova since 2009.

== Works ==
- Managementul cunoștințelor, Chișinău 2005
- Ghidul primarului, Chișinău 2005
- Ghidul orașelor din republica Moldova, Chișinău 2004
- Regulatory Governance in SEE Countries: Progress and Challenges, OECD 2004
- Основы государственного администрирования, Chișinău 2001.
- Managementul administrației publice. Manual, A.S.E.M., Chișinău 1999.
- Studii de caz. Îndrumar metodic la disciplina "Bazele managementului". A.S.E.M., Chișinău 1998.
