= Viorel Cibotaru =

Moldovan politician, political analyst and journalist (born 1958)

Colonel Viorel Cibotaru
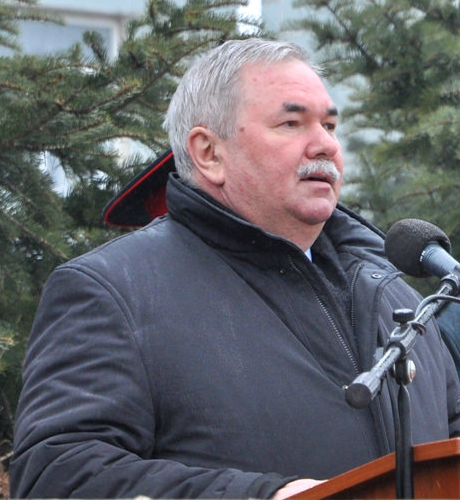
- Cibotaru in 2015

Moldovan Ambassador to Belgium, Luxembourg and NATO
- In office 30 May 2022 – 16 October 2026
- President: Maia Sandu
- Prime Minister: Natalia Gavrilița; Dorin Recean; Alexandru Munteanu; Eugen Osmochescu (acting); Vasile Tofan
- Preceded by: Lilian Darii
- Succeeded by: Valeriu Mija

President of the Liberal Democratic Party
- In office 18 June 2016 – 9 September 2018
- Preceded by: Vladimir Filat
- Succeeded by: Tudor Deliu

Minister of Defense
- In office 18 February 2015 – 30 July 2015
- President: Nicolae Timofti
- Prime Minister: Chiril Gaburici; Natalia Gherman (acting)
- Preceded by: Valeriu Troenco
- Succeeded by: Anatol Șalaru

Personal details
- Born: 19 April 1958 (age 68) Chișinău, Moldavian SSR, Soviet Union
- Party: Liberal Democratic Party of Moldova
- Education: Moldova State University
- Occupation: Journalist, philologist, politician, political analyst

Viorel Cibotaru (born 19 April 1958) is a Moldovan politician, former political analyst and journalist. He was the Minister of Defense of Moldova between 18 February 2015 and 30 July 2015. Cibotaru has authored four books.

== Biography ==
Viorel Cibotaru was born on 19 April 1958 in Chișinău. Between 1975 and 1980 he studied journalism at the State University of Moldova, and between 1981 and 1986 he graduated as a doctor of philological sciences.

In 1987 he held an internship at the Faculty of Journalism at "Mikhail Lomonosov" University in Moscow and in the same year he obtained his PhD in Philological Sciences. Between 1985 and 1988 he was a lecturer at the Faculty of Journalism at the State University of Moldova.

Between 1988 and 1992 he was first deputy head of the Education and Culture Directorate, head of the Interethnic Relations Sector, head of the Information Center of the Republican Council of Trade Unions in Moldova and Deputy Editor-in-Chief of "Vocea Poporului" newspaper.

In 1992, he was awarded the degree of Major.

Between 1992 and 1995 he was editor-in-chief of the newspaper "Oastea Moldovei", a publication of the Ministry of Defense. In 1995–1997 he was head of the Ministry of Defense press secretariat.

In 1996 he was transferred from active service to reserve, and in 1997 he was assigned lieutenant colonel.

Between 1997 and 1999 he was head of the Foreign Relations Department of the Ministry of Defense. In 1999 he was the deputy commander of the Peacekeeping Forces of the Republic of Moldova, and during July–December he was Lecturer at the Faculty of Journalism and Communication Sciences at the State University of Moldova. From December 1999 to June 2013, he was a lecturer at the journalism department of the Faculty of Journalism and Communication Sciences at the State University of Moldova.

Between 2000 and 2006 he was director of programs at the Institute of Public Policy (IPP). Since 2006 he is the director of the Invisible College of Moldova, Director of the European Institute for Political Studies in Moldova. Between 2008 and 2010 he was director of the Information and Documentation Center about NATO in Moldova. Since 2009, he is a Superior Associate member, Program Coordinator in Nepal of the Center from Geneva for the Democratic Control of Armed Forces.

On 18 February 2015, he was appointed Minister of Defense of the Republic of Moldova, which he exercised until 30 July 2015, when in the new cabinet he was replaced by Liberal Anatol Șalaru.

On 18 June 2016, the National Congress of the Liberal Democratic Party of Moldova took place. Candidates Valeriu Streleț, Liliana Palihovici, Tudor Deliu and Vadim Pistrinciuc, withdrew their candidacies in favor of Viorel Cibotaru. Thus, Cibotaru was elected chairman of the party.

== Personal life ==
Viorel Cibotaru is married and has one child. Besides Romanian, he speaks English, French, Russian, and Italian.

== Military Awards ==
- The Medal "In the Service of the Homeland", 1st degree
- The Medal "The 20th Anniversary of the National Army"
- Cross For Merit, first-class
- Cross "For Impeccable Service", first-class

== Publications ==
He has written four books and 80 scientific and publishing articles, published in publishing houses, in specialized editions, magazines, newspapers, or on the Internet.
