= Law on State Enterprises in the Republic of Moldova =

According to data from the State Register in November 2016, there are 1583 state and municipal enterprises in the Republic of Moldova, which represents one percent of the total number of legal entities and individual enterprises in the country. Heads of state-owned enterprises received generous salaries last year, while the profitability of enterprises was not at the highest level. For example, the former deputy in the Parliament of the Republic of Moldova from the Liberal Democratic Party, Simion Grisciuc, became the director of S.A. Tobacco-CTC in May 2015. According to the wealth statement, he earned a salary of 150,972 lei per month exercising the position of director, while the average salary in Republic of Moldova is 5600 lei. All state and municipal enterprises will be reorganized or liquidated within two years. The Parliament voted a draft law on state enterprise and municipal enterprise. The founder of state-owned enterprises will be only the Public Property Agency and there will be only joint-stock companies.

== Law No. 146 of 16 June 1994 on state enterprise ==
State enterprise is an enterprise whose social capital belongs entirely to the state. It is an independent economic entity with legal person rights, which, on the basis of state property, transfers them to management, carries out entrepreneurial activities. The enterprise has the right to open branches and representations and, with the consent of the public administration body, which organizes the department that exercises control over compliance with the antitrust legislation, to form consortium associations, consortia and other state-owned associations of enterprises on the basis of contracts concluded with other economic agents.

The decision on the establishment of the enterprise shall be adopted by the government, at the proposal of the central specialized body or of another administrative authority. The position of founder of the enterprise on behalf of the Government shall be exercised by the authority specified in the Government decision.

The board of directors is the collegiate body for the administration of the enterprise, represents the interests of the state and carries out its activity in accordance with this law, and the regulation of the board of the state enterprise approved by the founder. The members of the board of directors must be representatives of the Ministry of Finance, the Ministry of Economy, which will be the majority, representatives of the founder and the working group. Representatives of other central public administration authorities, industry specialists, economists and law specialists can also join.

The company sells its production, works, services and production waste at prices and tariffs established on the basis of supply and demand, and in the cases stipulated by the normative acts - at prices and tariffs regulated by the state. The enterprise's profit (loss) is determined in the manner prescribed by law. Net profit is formed after tax and other mandatory payments are paid and remains available to the enterprise. Net profit can be used for:

(a) covering the losses of previous years;
(b) the formation of reserve capital;
(c) formation of the reserve for the development of production;
(d) breakdowns in the state budget;
(e) for other purposes, if they do not contravene the legislation.

The activity of the enterprise ceases, in accordance with its statute and the founder's decision by reorganizing or liquidating. The enterprise may also be wound up by the competent court in accordance with the law.

== State-owned enterprises turn into "greenhouses" for dignitaries ==
In 2014, Transparency International Moldova published a report on the transparency monitoring of state-owned companies and joint stock companies with state-owned capital:

"Transparency International Moldova considers that the legislation regulating the activity of state-owned enterprises needs to be substantially revised, especially in the context of improving the quality and efficiency of business management. In particular, in opinion of experts, more rigorous requirements are needed for the qualification and work experience of the candidates for the position of manager of the enterprise, the remuneration of the administrator with the economic and financial performances of the company, the transparency in the selection process or the appointment of the managers of the enterprises state", says Lilia Carasciuc, executive director of Transparency International Moldova.

== Law on state and municipal enterprise with regard to organization and operation of the Public Property Agency ==
This law was drafted for the purpose of updating the provisions Law no.146 of 16 June 1994 on the state enterprise. Through this project, the public policies for the management of state enterprises and municipal enterprises will be updated and made uniform to the general norms of corporate governance, the attributions of the founder, the board of directors and the administrator will be clearly defined and delimited. The project regulates the particularities of establishment, operation and closure of the activity of state enterprises and municipal enterprises, the way of setting up, registering, using the assets handed in administration, the component, the attributions and the responsibility of the governing bodies.

In order not to allow the alienation of the assets assigned to the public domain and the goods with a social destination, the payment of the obligations to the state and other creditors with the mentioned goods, it is proposed to establish a special legal regime for them with the separate registration in the accounting records. It is proposed to extend the attributions of the board of directors of state and municipal enterprises.

Several industry experts' remarks show that some Moldovan state and municipal enterprises use the single-source procurement procedure to purchase goods and services: this generates significant risks, including potentially higher payments than market prices and a favorable environment for corruption. In order to diminish this phenomenon in the project, it is foreseen that the government will be responsible for the elaboration of the Model Regulation on the purchase of goods, things and services at the state and municipal enterprise.

This project proposes the setting up of the censor commission within the state / municipal enterprises, which will exercise the control over the economic and financial activity of the enterprise on a semi-annual basis. At the same time, for the purpose of excluding agreements between two or more parties, through which certain rights, goods are transferred or a commercial exchange is made within the enterprise, the project includes provisions for governing the settlement of conflicts of interest transactions.

The necessity to include provisions on the voluntary dissolution of the state enterprise and the municipal enterprise results from the fact that currently, in the State Register of Legal Entities, there are about 320 state-owned enterprises uncontrolled by the founders, which do not work for many years, and usually, do not have any material goods.

There is the risk of state liability towards the obligations of the state-owned enterprise, arising from the jurisprudence of the European Court of Human Rights, the state is responsible for any debt of the enterprise. In order to observe the principle of maximum transparency in the activity of the state enterprise, the draft stipulates that the documents and the information are to be placed on the website of the enterprise, the founder and the Public Property Agency.
