= Vacarciuc =

Vacarciuc is a surname. Notable people with the surname include:

- Andrei Vacarciuc (born 1952), Moldovan politician
- Vadim Vacarciuc (born 1972), Moldovan weightlifter
