= Petru Știrbate =

Moldovan politician (born 1960)

Petru Ştirbate

Member of the Moldovan Parliament
- In office 23 February 2015 – 9 March 2019
- Preceded by: Maia Sandu
- Parliamentary group: Liberal Democratic Party; Democratic Party
- In office 28 December 2010 – 9 December 2014
- Parliamentary group: Liberal Democratic Party

Personal details
- Born: 8 February 1960 (age 66) Ghiduleni
- Party: Liberal Democratic Party; Alliance for European Integration (2010–present)

Petru Ştirbate (born February 8, 1960) is a politician from Moldova. He has been a member of the Parliament of Moldova since 2010.
