= Andrei Vacarciuc =

Moldovan politician (born 1952)

Member of the Moldovan Parliament
- Incumbent
- Assumed office 2010

Personal details
- Born: 17 July 1952 (age 73) Javgur, Moldova
- Party: Liberal Democratic Party; Alliance for European Integration (2010–present)

Andrei Vacarciuc (born July 17, 1952) is a Moldovan politician. He has been a member of the Parliament of Moldova since 2010.
