= George Mocanu =

Moldovan politician (born 1982)

Member of the Moldovan Parliament
- Incumbent
- Assumed office 2010

Personal details
- Born: 24 September 1982 (age 43) Moleşti, Moldavian SSR
- Party: Liberal Democratic Party; Alliance for European Integration (2010–present)

George Mocanu (born September 24, 1982) is a politician from Moldova. He has been a member of the Parliament of Moldova since 2010.
