= Mocan (surname) =

Mocan is a Romanian and Turkish surname. Notable people with the surname include:

- Liviu Mocan (born 1955), Romanian sculptor and poet
- Naci Mocan, Turkish-American economist and scholar

== See also ==
- Mocan (disambiguation)
- Mocanu
