= Mocanu =

Mocanu is a Romanian surname. Notable people with the surname include:

- Ana Mocanu (born 1937), Romanian volleyball player
- Diana Mocanu (born 1984), Romanian swimmer
- George Mocanu (born 1982), Moldovan politician
- Ion Mocanu, (born 1962), Romanian handball player
- Mihai Mocanu (1942–2009), Romanian footballer
- Petru Mocanu (1931–2016), Romanian mathematician
- Sergiu Mocanu (born 1961), Moldovan politician

== See also ==
- Mocan (surname)
