= Lilia Bolocan =

Moldovan politician (born 1972)

Member of the Moldovan Parliament
- In office 24 December 2010 – 14 February 2011
- Succeeded by: Victor Bodiu
- Parliamentary group: Liberal Democratic Party

Personal details
- Born: 13 November 1972 (age 53) Tîrșiței, Telenești District
- Party: Liberal Democratic Party of Moldova

Lilia Bolocan (born 13 November 1972) is a historian, politician and doctor of psychology from the Republic of Moldova, who since December 24, 2009 has been the General Manager of the State Agency for Intellectual Property of the Republic of Moldova. He has served as Director General of State Agency for Intellectual Property since 2009. In 2010-2011 she was deputy in the Parliament of the Republic of Moldova. Lilia Bolocan is part of the Liberal Democratic Party of Moldova (LDPM) since 2007. He is a member of the LDPM National Political Council.
