= 2015 Moldovan local elections =

Local elections were held in Moldova on 14 June 2015, with a runoff for mayors two weeks later.

== Legal context ==
According to Article 119 of the "Electoral Code" of Moldova, local elected representatives are elected "for a four year term, which begins from the date of conducting local general elections". The previous local election was held in 2011.
