= Simion Grișciuc =

Moldovan politician (born 1977)

Simion Grişciuc

Member of the Moldovan Parliament
- Incumbent
- Assumed office 2011

Personal details
- Born: 25 August 1977 (age 48)
- Party: Liberal Democratic Party; Alliance for European Integration (2010–present)

Simion Grişciuc (born August 25, 1977) is a politician from Moldova. He has served as a member of the Parliament of Moldova since 2011.
