= Pro-European Coalition =

2013–2015 ruling coalition in Moldova

- Type: Ruling Coalition
- Purpose: Governing in Moldova
- Headquarters: Chișinău
- Members: Liberal Democratic Party (PLDM); Democratic Party (PDM); Liberal Reformists Party (PLR)
- Key people: Vlad Filat; Marian Lupu; Ion Hadârcă; Iurie Leancă
- Website: PLDM, PDM, PLR

The Pro-European Coalition (Romanian: Coaliția Pro-Europeană) was the ruling coalition in Moldova from 30 May 2013 until 18 February 2015. Its leaders were Vlad Filat, Marian Lupu, and Ion Hadârcă. The previous Alliance for European Integration collapsed after it lost a no confidence vote on March 5, 2013. It was succeeded by the Political Alliance for a European Moldova.

== Reactions ==
- European Union – “The months of political instability are finally over and now Prime Minister Leancă and his government can move forward with many crucial reforms - such as the fight against corruption - which are needed in order to guarantee the EU integration of Moldova,” the President of the European People’s Party, Wilfried Martens stated on May 31, 2013.
- Poland – "We hope that in the context of the upcoming 3rd Eastern Partnership Summit, which will be held in Vilnius this November, the stabilization of the country’s political situation will help complete an important stage in bringing Moldova closer to the European Union" noted the MFA on May 30, 2013.

== See also ==
- Leancă Cabinet - list of coalition ministers.
