= Greater Moldova Party =

Moldovan political party

Greater Moldova Party Partidul Moldova Mare
- Abbreviation: PMM
- President: Victoria Furtună
- Founded: 5 May 2007
- Headquarters: Chișinău, Moldova
- Ideology: Populism; Moldovenism; Moldovan irredentism Russophilia; Social liberalism Anti-Western sentiment Disputed: Pro-Europeanism
- Slogan: "For God! For land! For Moldovans!"

Website
- moldovamare.md

The Greater Moldova Party (Romanian: Partidul Moldova Mare, PMM), known before 2020 as the Party For the Nation and Country (Partidul Pentru Neam și Țară), and sometimes translated as the Great Moldova Party, is a pro-Russian political party in Moldova.

== History ==
The party was formed on 5 May 2007 in Ratuș, Criuleni District; Tudor Deliu was elected as the president of the party. It was registered on 17 July 2007. Between this day and 21 January 2009, the official name of the party was Mișcarea social-politică "Pentru Neam și Țară".

The party won 0.28% of the votes at the 2010 parliamentary election, dropping to 0.11% in 2014. It obtained 18 councillors (0.17%) and two mayors (0.22%) at the 2011 local elections.

Nicolae Uțică was the party's president until 28 December 2011. As of 2020, Teodor Turta was the president of the party, having been renamed from the "For the Nation and Country Party" to the "Greater Moldova Party". After Turta, Veaceslav Tîron became the party's president.

On 2 March 2025, party leadership was taken by Victoria Furtună, who had been a candidate in the 2024 Moldovan presidential election supported by Moldovan oligarch Ilan Shor, then a fugitive from justice hiding in Russia. During her presidential campaign, Furtună had stated that the idea of Moldova's accession into the European Union (EU) seemed unattainable and was "profoundly absurd". However, after taking over the party's leadership, she declared to Ziarul de Gardă that the process of EU integration could not be stopped "and I do not see it opportune to stop it either," "when there are also benefits". At the time, the party's statutes established that it was an organization "of social-liberal orientation, with European vocation".

Moldovan actor and television presenter Sergiu Voloc joined the party "a few weeks ago" as he stated for a Moldovan newspaper NewsMaker article published on 25 June.

On 23 August, the PMM's registration application for the 2025 parliamentary election was rejected. According to the Central Electoral Commission of Moldova (CEC), the party's candidate list did not meet the legal gender criterion because, after the exclusion from the list of a person convicted of domestic violence, which made the person ineligible for being included as a candidate, the list no longer met the minimum quota of candidates from each gender required by law, invalidating the party's registration application. Furtună reacted by stating that she was not informed in time and that the situation were intentional "tendentious" actions by the CEC towards "a patriotic party", pledging that she would appeal the decision. On 26 August, the Central Court of Appeal ruled that the CEC would have to re-examine the PMM's registration application, the Supreme Court of Justice (CSJ) overturned this decision and confirmed the CEC's exclusion of the party from the election on 30 August and then the CSJ rejected the CEC's appeal and confirmed the Central Court of Appeal's decision on 3 September. The CEC thus registered the PMM in the election two days later, with the reservation of excluding the party again if it did not modify its list to comply with the gender quota.

The party's list of candidates for the 2025 parliamentary election featured Irina Caraman, a journalist of the public Gagauzia Radio Television, on 7th place. It also featured lawyer Igor Hlopețchi, who in the past requested that President of Moldova Maia Sandu undergo a psychiatric examination "and be hospitalized for supervision for 90 days", on 6th place; and former Party of Communists (PCRM) parliament member and later TV presenter Victor Stepaniuc, who Ziarul de Gardă described as a known Moldovenist, on 15th place. The party's slogan for the election was "For God! For land! For Moldovans!" (Pentru Dumnezeu! Pentru pământ! Pentru moldoveni!).

On 26 September, two days before the parliamentary election, the CEC annulled the registration of the PMM and of its list of candidates and excluded the party from the election. The justification included that the party benefited from illegal foreign funding and that it promoted the interests of a foreign state, and the CEC stated that it would request the Ministry of Justice to limit the PMM's activity. The decision followed a complaint by the European Social Democratic Party (PSDE)'s leader Tudor Ulianovschi after investigations by Moldovan newspapers Ziarul de Gardă and NordNews which showed the mobilization of the network of the Russian NGO Evrazia in support of the PMM and also of the Patriotic Electoral Bloc and Alternative. After receiving information from the Security and Intelligence Service (SIS) and other institutions, the CEC determined that there were suspicions of illegal funding of the party and of connections with formations created by Shor. The CEC also highlighted that Furtună was under EU sanctions at the time; she had been sanctioned on 15 July because of actions destabilizing or threatening Moldova's sovereignty and independence. Furtună suggested she would appeal the decision, accused the CEC's members of carrying out an order from the government and of "persecuting" and "quarreling" with her party and filed a series of recusal requests against some members of the institution which were rejected. The party's appeal against the decision of the CEC was rejected by the Central Court of Appeal on 28 September.

On 30 September, the Ministry of Justice requested the Central Court of Appeal to limit the PMM's activity for 12 months over illegal funding of the party and its "succession" from the unconstitutional Șor Party. According to SIS representatives, a third of the party's members had received money transfers through Promsvyazbank, a Russian bank then subject to international sanctions, stating also that the SIS considered the party "an extension" of Shor's criminal group. On 2 October, as a precautionary measure, the Central Court of Appeal limited the PMM's activity until a final verdict was made on its case.
