= Voinova =

- Village
- Location within Moldova
- Coordinates: 47.2705555556°N 28.4888888889°E
- Country: Moldova
- District: Strășeni

Government
  - Mayor: Valeriu Barba (PAS)

Population (2014 census)
  - Total: 1,384
- Time zone: UTC+2 (EET)
  - Summer (DST): UTC+3 (EEST)

Voinova is a village in Strășeni District, Moldova.

== Demographics ==
According to the 2014 Moldovan census, Voinova had a population of 1,384 residents. The village covers an area of 16.8 square kilometers, resulting in a population density of approximately 82.4 inhabitants per square kilometer as of 2014. Between the 2004 and 2014 censuses, the village experienced a population decline of about 2.1%.

The gender distribution was nearly even, with 686 males (49.6%) and 698 females (50.4%). Children under the age of 15 made up 21.5% of the population, 69.7% were of working age (15–64), and 8.8% were aged 65 and over. The entire population lived in rural areas.

The vast majority of residents (98.3%) were born in Moldova, while 1.5% came from countries within the Commonwealth of Independent States. Ethnically, the population was predominantly Moldovan (96.9%), with small numbers of Romanians (2.3%) and Ukrainians (0.5%). Regarding native language, 70.5% of residents reported Moldovan as their mother tongue, 28.4% Romanian, and 0.9% Russian.

In terms of religion, nearly all residents (98.6%) identified as Orthodox.

== Administration and local government ==
Voinova is governed by a local council composed of nine members. The most recent local elections, in November 2023, resulted in the following composition: 5 councillors from the Party of Action and Solidarity, 3 councillors from the European Social Democratic Party, and Barba Grigore who ran independently. In the same elections, the candidate from the Party of Action and Solidarity, Valeriu Barba, was elected as mayor with a 59.18% majority of the vote.
