= Tudor Deliu =

Moldovan politician (1955–2023)

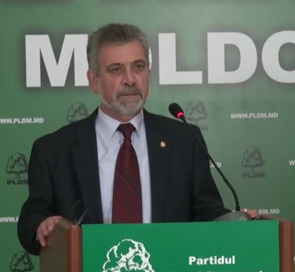
- Deliu in 2015

President of the Liberal Democratic Party
- In office 29 July 2009 – 9 March 2019
- Preceded by: Viorel Cibotaru
- Succeeded by: Vlad Filat

Member of the Moldovan Parliament
- In office 31 March 2010 – 9 March 2019
- Preceded by: Alexandru Tănase
- Parliamentary group: Liberal Democratic Party

Mayor of Răzeni
- In office 1990–1994

Personal details
- Born: 29 October 1955 Malcoci, Moldavian SSR, Soviet Union
- Died: 4 August 2023 (aged 67) Chișinău, Moldova
- Resting place: Chișinău Central Cemetery
- Party: Liberal Democratic Party (PLDM)
- Education: Moldova State University
- Awards: Order of Work Glory

Tudor Deliu (29 October 1955 – 4 August 2023) was a Moldovan politician, professor, and lecturer. He was a member of the Parliament of Moldova from 2010 to 2019, on the lists of the Liberal Democratic Party of Moldova, acting as chairperson of the parliamentary faction of PLDM and secretary of the "Parliamentary Commission, Appointments and Immunities".

== Political life ==
During the period from 1990 to 1994, Deliu was mayor of Răzeni village in Ialoveni District.

Tudor Deliu was the first president of the social-political movement "For the Nation and Country Party" (now the Greater Moldova Party) from 5 May 2007 to the summer of 2008, when the party joined the Liberal Democratic Party of Moldova. Subsequently, Tudor Deliu was on the PLDM electoral lists, but the movement continued to function.

In 2014 he was included in position 52 in the "TOP 100 most influential politicians of November 2014" (from the Republic of Moldova) in the version of Institute for Political Analysis and Consultancy ”POLITICON”.

On 9 September 2018, at the 7th Congress of the Liberal Democratic Party of Moldova, Tudor Deliu was elected the new party's president.

According to the polls made in 2019 referring to the most popular politicians of the Republic of Moldova, Tudor Deliu is positioned eleventh among the top of politicians in which Moldovans have the highest trust and in another opinion poll it was positioned on the thirteenth position.

== Personal life and death ==
Deliu was a football fan, played football and even coached a local team. He was married and has three children. Besides Romanian, he also spoke French and Russian. Tudor Deliu was a veteran of the armed conflict on the left bank of the Dniester, where he was the Major General of the Carabinieri.

Tudor Deliu died on 4 August 2023, at the age of 67.
