= Republican Party of Moldova =

Republican Party of Moldova Partidul Republican din Moldova
- President: Andrei Stratan
- Founded: 5 October 1999
- Headquarters: Chişinău, Moldova

Website
- ppnt.md

The Republican Party of Moldova (Romanian: Partidul Republican din Moldova) is a political party in Moldova.

== History ==
Republican Party of Moldova (RPM) was established on 15 August 1999. The Founding Congress adopted the party program and bylaws and elected the governing bodies, including the Party Chairperson, Ion Curtean.

In the 5 April 2009 legislative elections, it did not pass the election threshold as it polled 0.09% of the vote. Before the early parliamentary elections of 29 July 2009, it withdrew from the race and campaigned for the Democratic Party of Moldova.

Former Minister of Foreign Affairs Andrei Stratan was elected leader of the Republican Party at the 1 August 2010 congress of the party by a unanimous vote. The party's former chairman Ion Curtean and vice chairman Valerian Hortolomei remained to work as part of the party, but it is not yet known what posts they will hold.

The Central Election Commission of Moldova registered the party as a participant in the campaign for the 5 September constitutional referendum. The party will campaign in favor of the referendum and urge the people to vote for amending Article 78 of the Constitution.

== Chairperson ==
- Andrei Stratan
- Ion Curtean
