= Social-Political Movement of the Roma =

Social-Political Movement of the Roma Mişcarea social-politică a Romilor din Republica Moldova
- Founded: 31 March 2010
- Headquarters: Chişinău, Moldova

The Social-Political Movement of the Roma (Romanian: Mişcarea social-politică a Romilor din Republica Moldova) is a political party in Moldova.
