= Vlad Filat =

Prime Minister of Moldova from 2009 to 2013

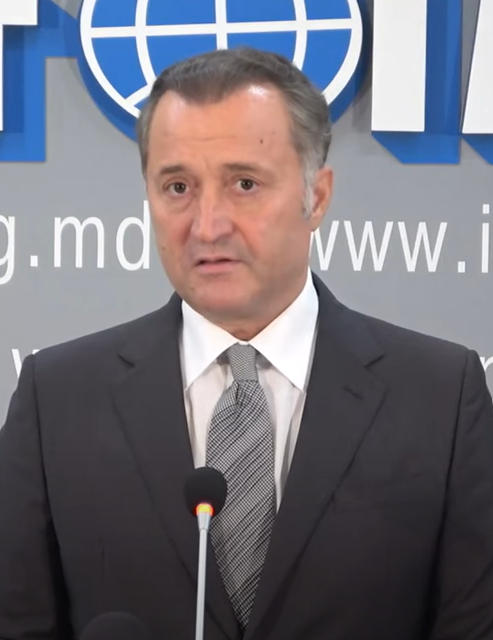
- Filat in 2023

8th Prime Minister of Moldova
- In office 25 September 2009 – 25 April 2013
- President: Mihai Ghimpu (acting); Himself (acting); Marian Lupu (acting); Nicolae Timofti
- Deputy: See list: Iurie Leancă; Valeriu Lazăr; Victor Osipov; Ion Negrei; Eugen Carpov; Mihai Moldovanu
- Preceded by: Vitalie Pîrlog (acting)
- Succeeded by: Iurie Leancă

Acting President of Moldova
- In office 28 December 2010 – 30 December 2010
- Prime Minister: Himself
- Preceded by: Mihai Ghimpu (acting)
- Succeeded by: Marian Lupu (acting)

President of the Liberal Democratic Party
- Incumbent
- Assumed office 2 July 2023
- Preceded by: Iulian David (acting)
- In office 16 August 2020 – 29 April 2021
- Preceded by: Tudor Deliu
- Succeeded by: Iulian David (acting)
- In office 8 December 2007 – 27 May 2016
- Succeeded by: Viorel Cibotaru

Minister of State
- In office 12 March 1999 – 21 December 1999
- President: Petru Lucinschi
- Prime Minister: Ion Sturza
- Preceded by: Nicolae Cernomaz
- Succeeded by: Victor Bodiu (2009)

Member of the Moldovan Parliament
- In office 9 December 2014 – 15 December 2016
- Succeeded by: Simion Grișciuc
- Parliamentary group: Liberal Democratic Party
- In office 24 December 2010 – 14 February 2011
- Succeeded by: Elena Frumosu
- Parliamentary group: Liberal Democratic Party
- In office 17 March 2005 – 25 September 2009
- Succeeded by: Ivan Ionaș
- Parliamentary group: Democratic Moldova Electoral Bloc; Democratic Party; Liberal Democratic Party

Personal details
- Born: Vladimir Filat; 6 May 1969 (age 57) Lăpușna, Moldavian SSR, Soviet Union (now Moldova)
- Citizenship: Moldova; Romania
- Party: Democratic Party (1997–2007); Liberal Democratic Party (2007–2016), (2020–present)
- Other political affiliations: Alliance for Democracy and Reforms (1998–1999); Alliance for European Integration (2009–present)
- Spouse(s): Sanda Filat (Divorced 2012); Angela Gonța (2014–2016)
- Children: 3
- Education: University of Iași

Vladimir Filat (born 6 May 1969), commonly referred to as Vlad Filat (Romanian: [ˈvlad fiˈlat]), is a Moldovan businessman, politician, and tycoon and founder of Liberal Democratic Party of Moldova. He was Prime Minister of Moldova from 25 September 2009 to 25 April 2013. He also was appointed as the interim president of Moldova for a brief period of time in 2010. Following his conviction on charges of accepting bribes, Filat was released from jail in December 2019, 6 years earlier than his initial sentence.

== Education and early career ==
Vlad is the second child of Maria and Vasile Filat and was born on May 6, 1969, in Lăpușna, a commune in the Moldavian SSR. Alongside his two sisters (Ala and Valentina) and brother Ion, Vlad grew up in a part of Lăpușna called "Talcioc". In 1986, he graduated from high school in his hometown. Between 1986 and 1987, he worked at the school radio station until he was called up for military service. He carried out his compulsory military service in the Soviet Army (May 8, 1987 – August 15, 1989), in Simferopol and Sevastopol. He served in the KGB's Border Troops, holding the rank of private first class and being decorated by his KGB superiors.

From 1989 to 1990, he studied at the Cooperation College (Kooperativny technikum) of Chișinău, going on to study law at the University of Iași (1990–1994). As a student, he was the leader of the "League of students from Bessarabia in Romania", an organization formed by Moldovan students in Romania. In Iași, among his classmates was Alexandru Tănase. While he was a student in Iași, he met his wife Sanda in the autumn of 1991; they dated for only three months before they married.

Between 1994 and 1998, Vlad Filat initiated and conducted more business in Romania. He was general director of "RoMold Trading SRL" in Iași (1994–1997) and the president of the Administrative Council of "Dosoftei" company in Iași (1997–1998).

== Early political activity ==
Filat was a member of the Democratic Party of Moldova (PDM) from 1997, when the party was founded, until 2007. Having returned to Moldova for good in 1998, he was appointed general director of the Department of Privatization and State Property Administration from the Ministry of Economy and Reform of the Government of the Republic of Moldova (1998–1999).

He was a State minister in the Ion Sturza cabinet of Alliance for Democracy and Reforms from 12 March 1999, to 12 November 1999. In 2000, Filat was elected vice-president of the Democratic Party (PDM). In the 2005 parliamentary election, he became a member of the Moldovan Parliament. Until March 2009, he was vice-president of the Parliamentary Commission for Security, Public Order, and Defense. He was also a member of the EU-Moldova Parliamentary Cooperation Committee.

He ran for Mayor of Chișinău in the 2007 local election and won 8.32% of the vote, in fourth place. Soon after the local election, in September 2007, he left the Democratic Party after ten years of political activity inside the party. Filat has been the president of the Liberal Democratic Party of Moldova since December 2007.

== 2009 Moldovan parliamentary elections ==
In the April 2009 parliamentary election, his party won 15 seats and in the July 2009 parliamentary election PLDM became the second largest party in the country with 18 seats and the first party within the Alliance For European Integration (AIE).

== Alliance for European Integration ==
After the July 2009 parliamentary election, alongside Mihai Ghimpu, Marian Lupu, and Serafim Urechean, Vlad Filat signed the Alliance For European Integration (AIE) in a press-conference on August 8, 2009. Towards the end of August 2009, he became the candidate of the Alliance For European Integration (AIE) for the position of Prime Minister of Moldova.

== Prime minister ==
The Constitutional Court of Moldova confirmed earlier on September 17, 2009 the legitimacy of Mihai Ghimpu's position as Acting President of Moldova, which gave him the right to nominate a prime minister. On the same day, Ghimpu signed a decree nominating Filat for the office of prime minister. Earlier on September 17, the parliament approved a new government structure; according to the draft structure, the number of ministries remains unchanged at 16 but their names and responsibilities have been changed.

The Alliance for European Integration gave a vote of confidence to the new government headed by PM Vladimir Filat at a plenary meeting on September 25, 2009.

On March 8, 2013 Filat was dismissed by motion of censure following charges of corruption, abuse of power and influence peddling. In spite of this, President Nicolae Timofti decreed that members of the government should continue to exert their public duties until a new government were to be formed.

Subsequently, on April 10, 2013 the President nominated Vlad Filat as a candidate for prime minister, authorizing him with the mission of forming a new government. However, on April 22, 2013, the Constitutional Court ruled that this decree is unconstitutional, stating that a prime minister ousted by vote of no confidence following suspicions of corruption cannot further perform this duty and that the president has the constitutional obligation to appoint in the interim capacity a member of the government whose integrity was not affected.

The president appointed Iurie Leancă as acting prime minister on April 25, 2013.

== Arrest and accusations of corruption ==
Filat was stripped of his immunity and handcuffed in parliament on October 15, 2015. He was investigated for the 2014 Moldovan bank fraud scandal and accused of having taken bribes of about $250 million from Ilan Shor, who was chairman of the board at Savings Bank from April to November 28, 2014.

Filat has denied wrongdoing and said the allegations against him are politically motivated.

On June 27, 2016, Vlad Filat was sentenced to 9 years in prison.

In February 2019, Filat's son was ordered to pay nearly half a million pounds after an investigation by the UK National Crime Agency found that he had paid £390,000 up front for a lavish apartment in the Knightsbridge area of London and £200,000 for a Bentley Bentayga. With no registered income in the UK, three bank accounts belonging to his son were frozen under Criminal Finances Act 2017.

== Honours ==
- Moldova – Order of the Republic (December 2013)
- Romania – Grand Cross of the National Order of Faithful Service (25 November 2014)
- Georgia – Order of Excellence (November 2013)

== Personal life ==
Filat divorced Sanda Filat in August 2012, a psychologist. They have two children.

In January 2014, Vlad Filat married former Pro TV Chișinău presenter Angela Gonța. In June 2014 Vlad Filat and Angela Gonța became parents with birth of their daughter.

== Gallery ==
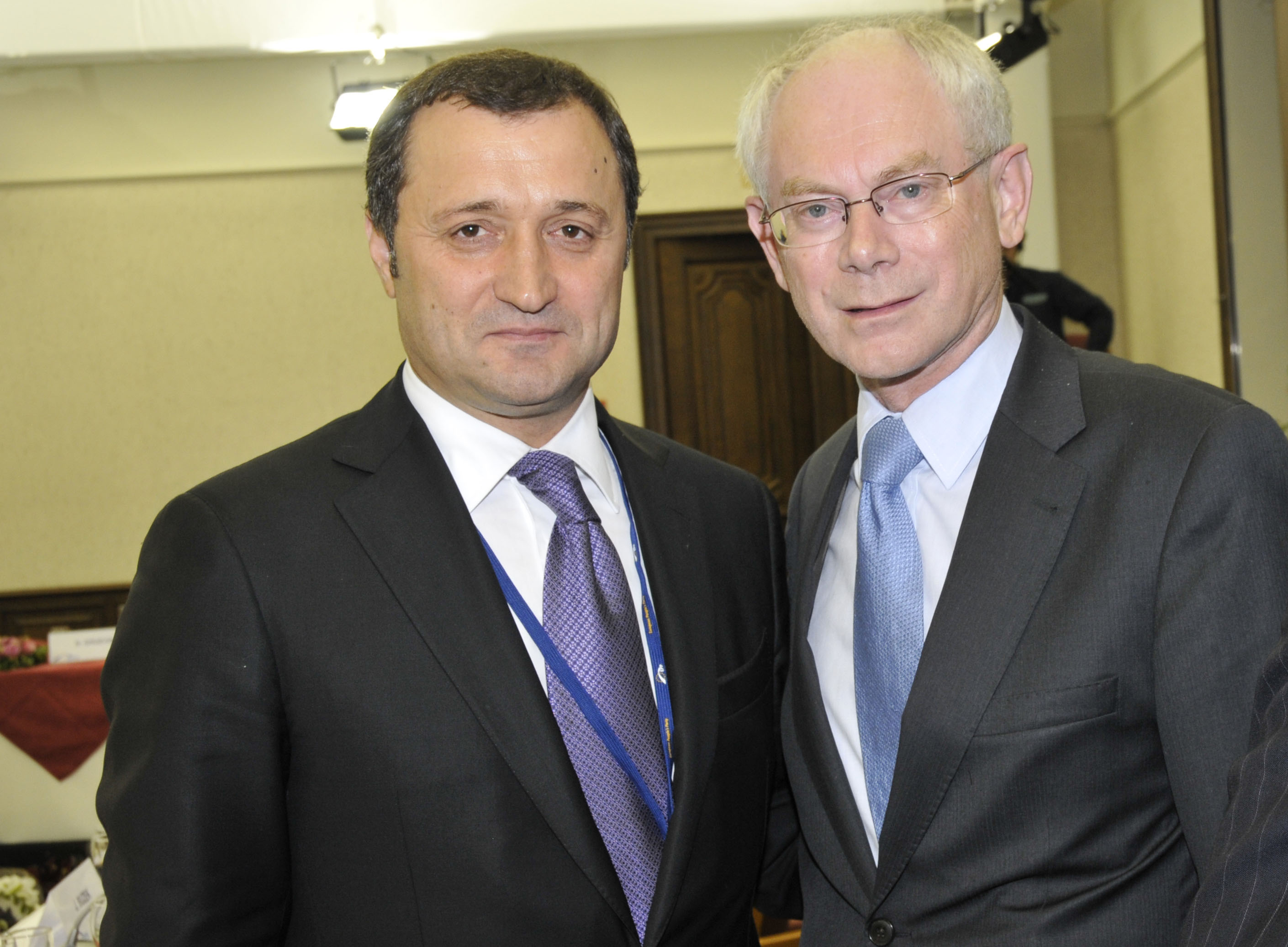
Filat and Herman Van Rompuy

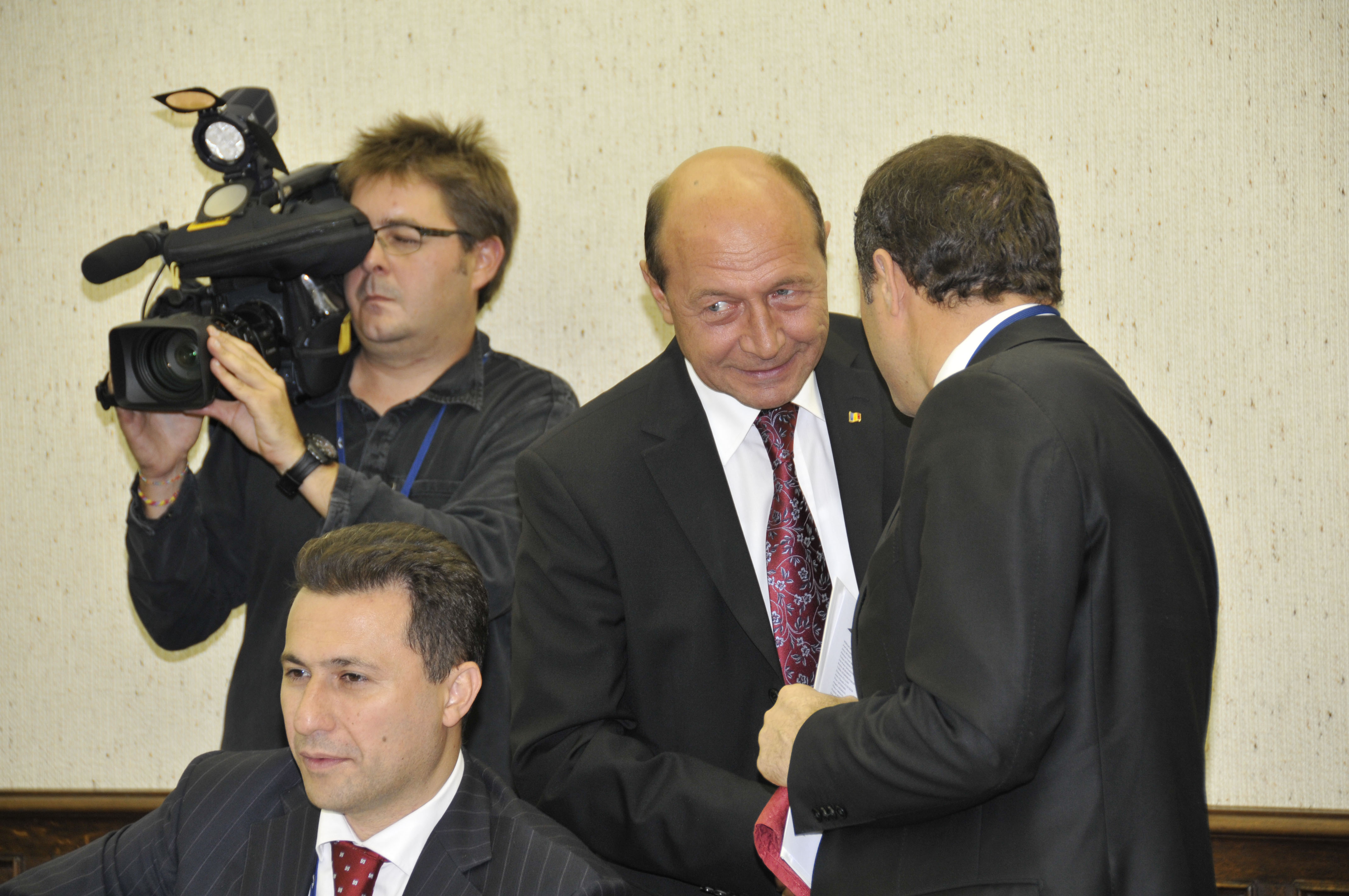
Traian Băsescu and Filat

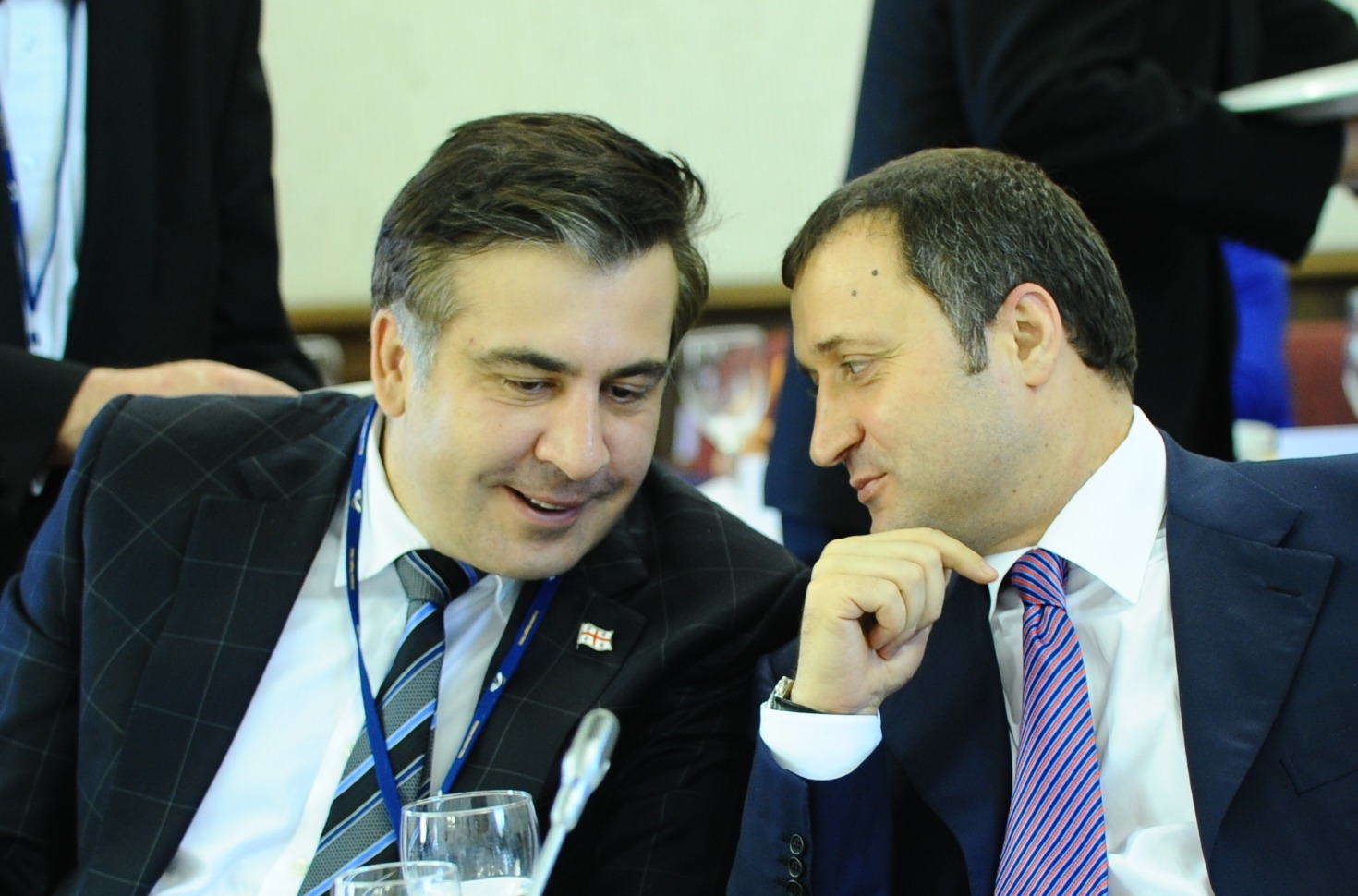
Mikheil Saakashvili and Filat

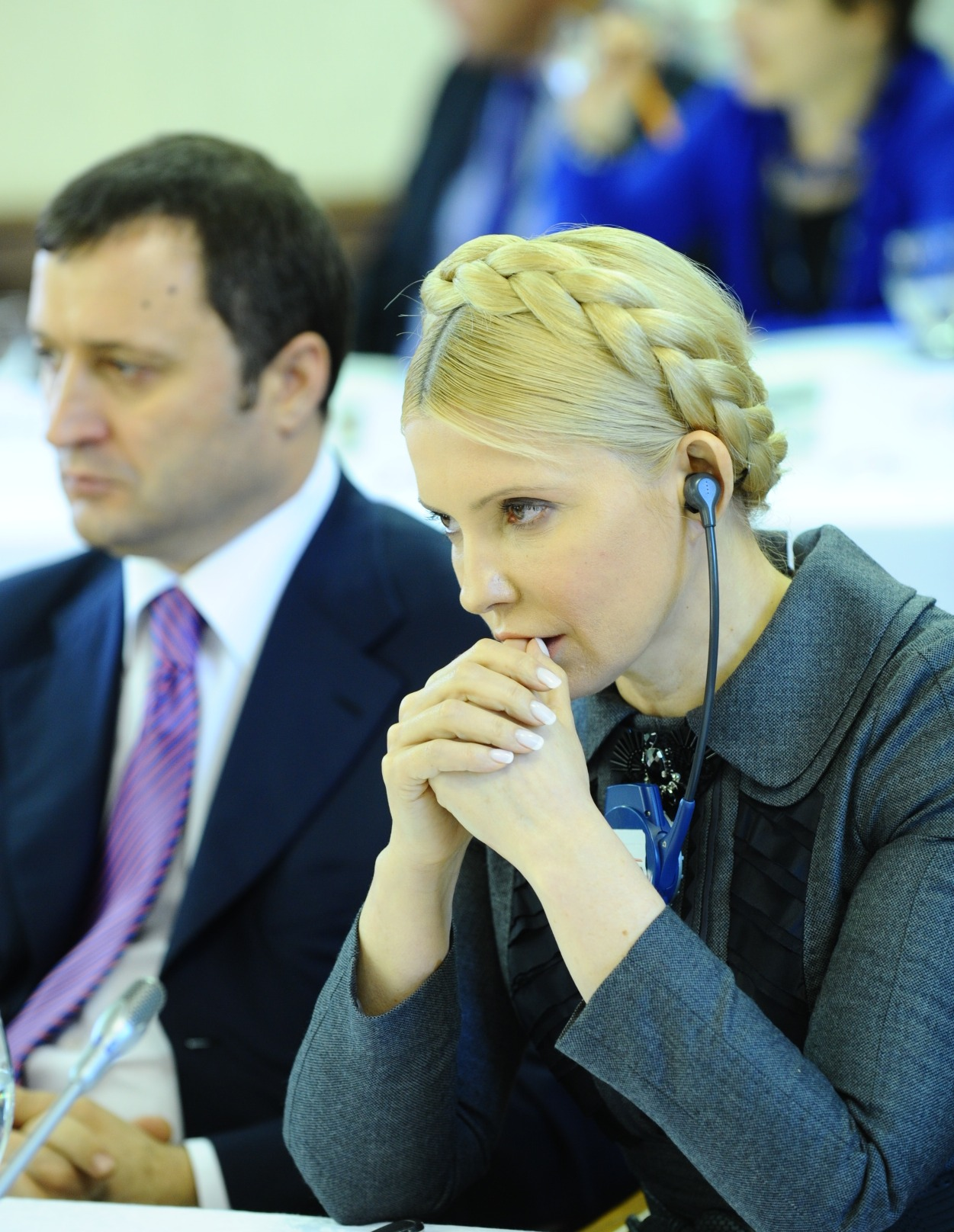
Filat and Yulia Tymoshenko

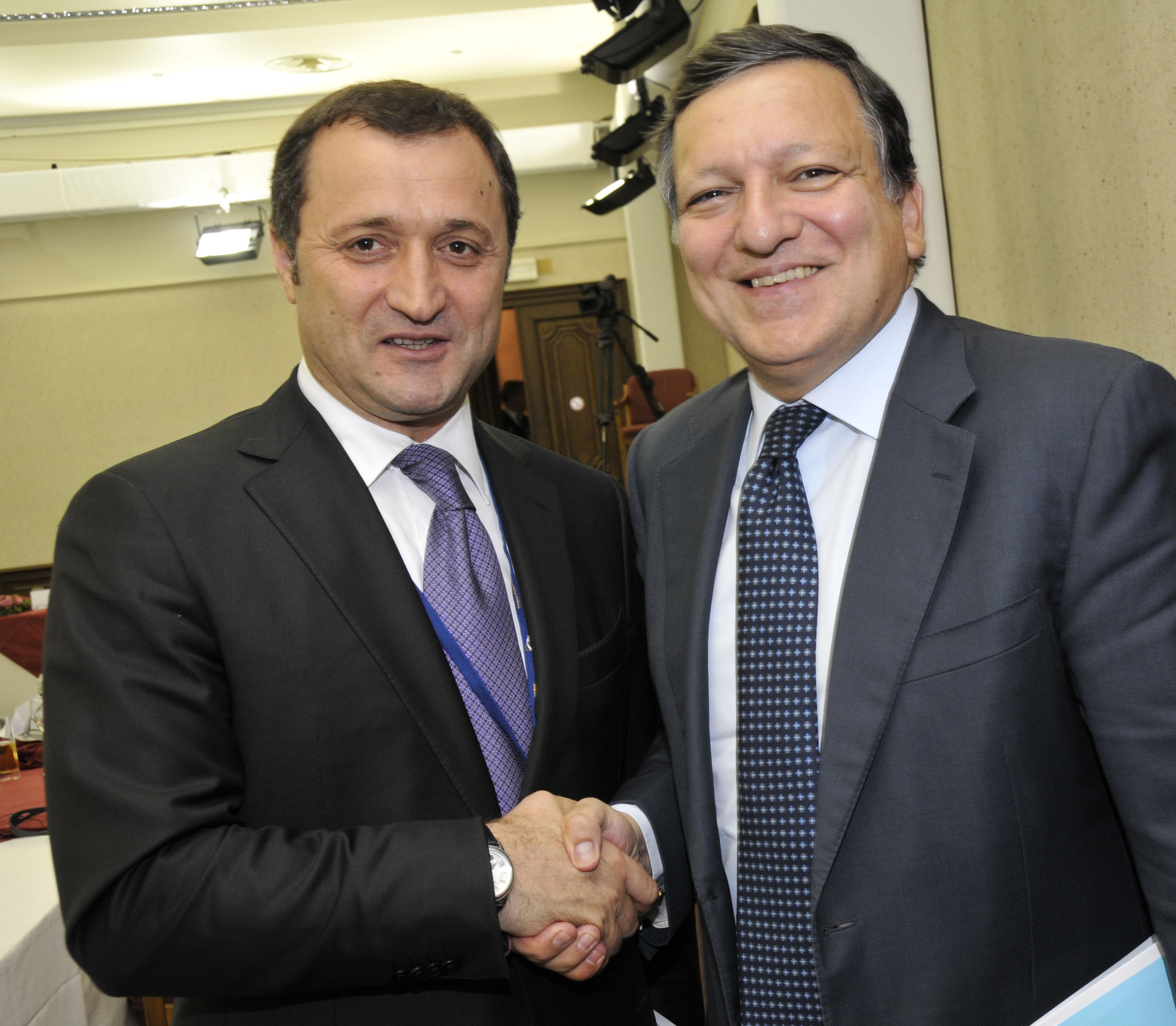
Filat and José Manuel Barroso

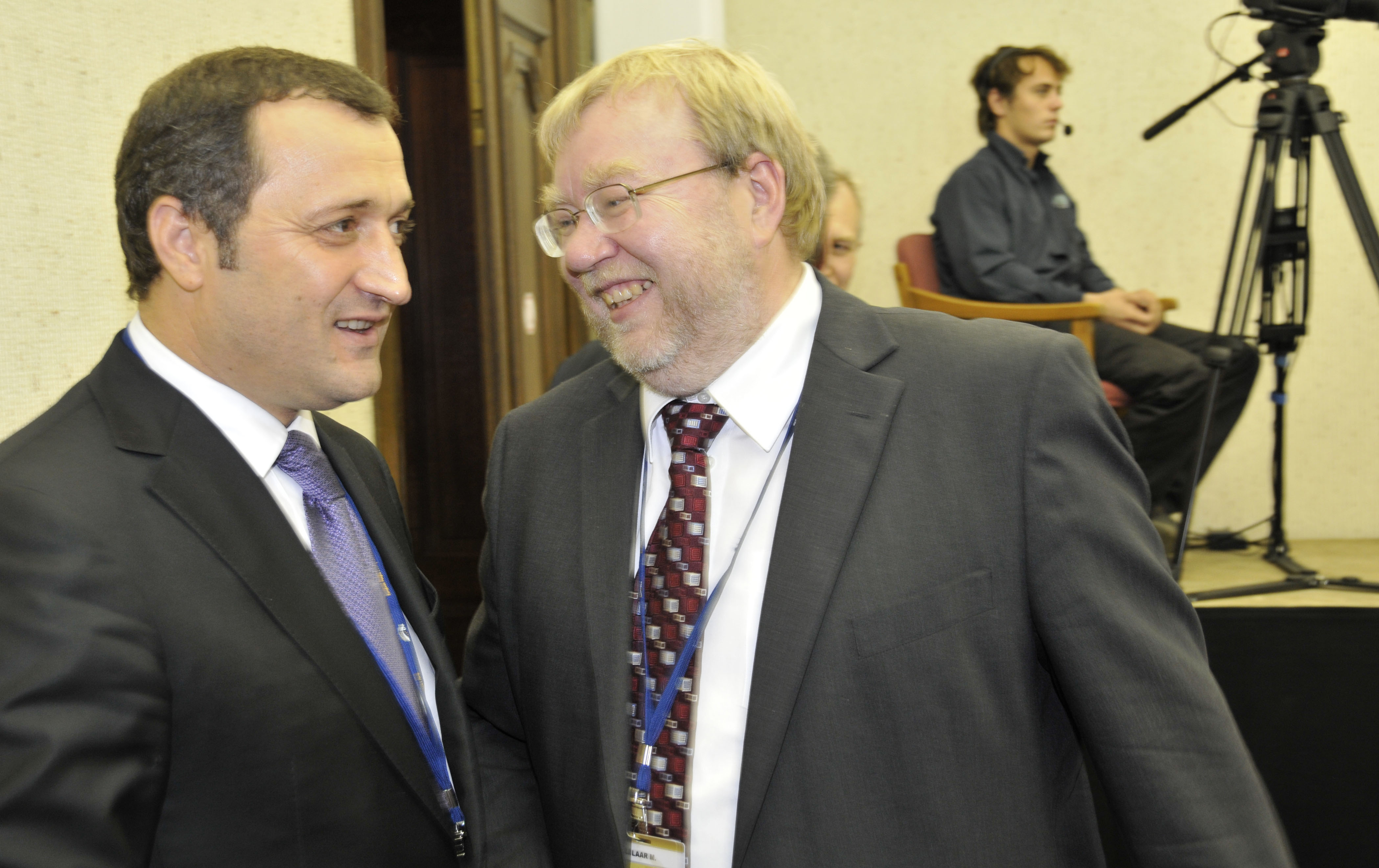
Filat and Mart Laar

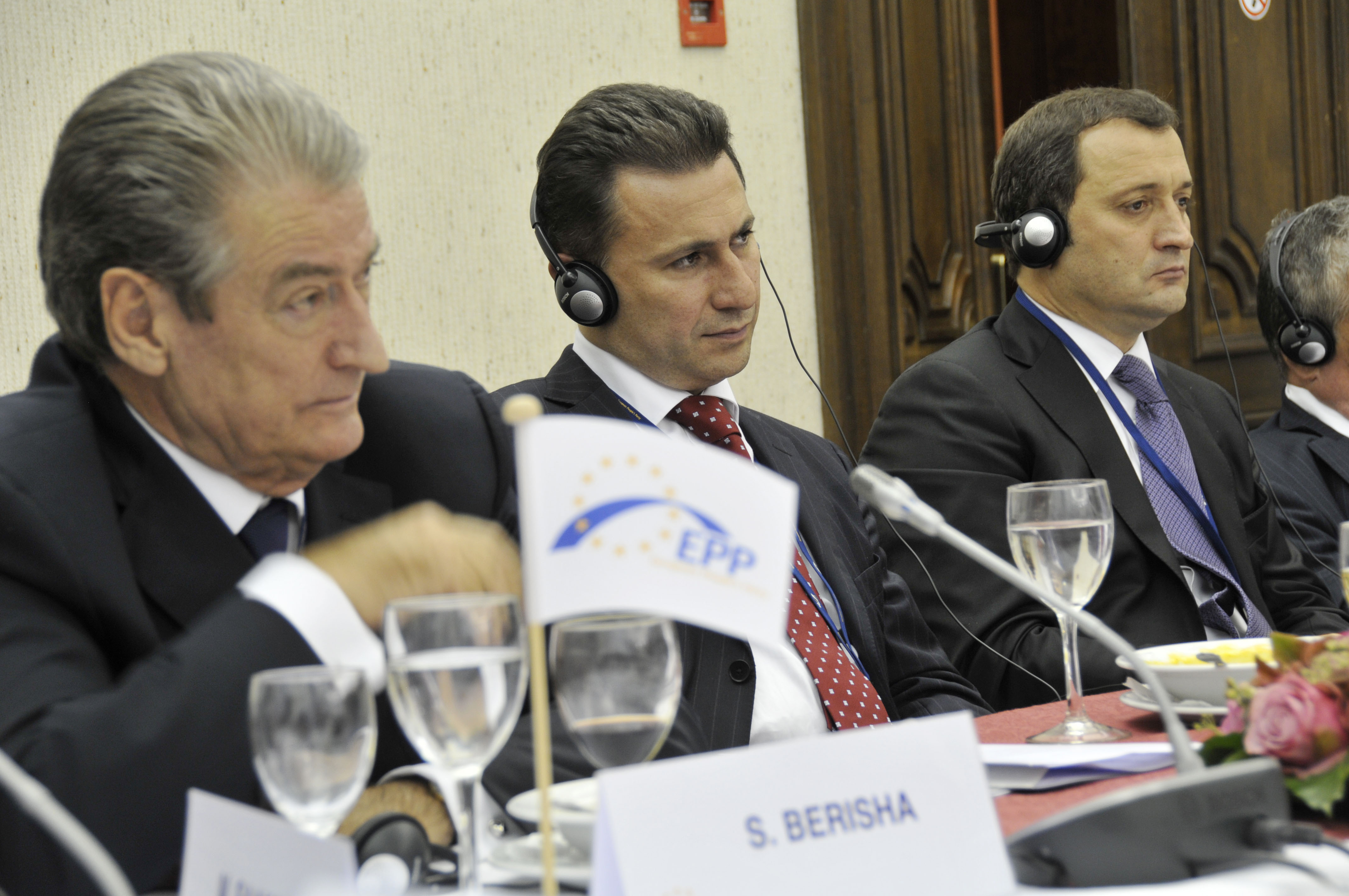
Sali Berisha, Nikola Gruevski and Filat

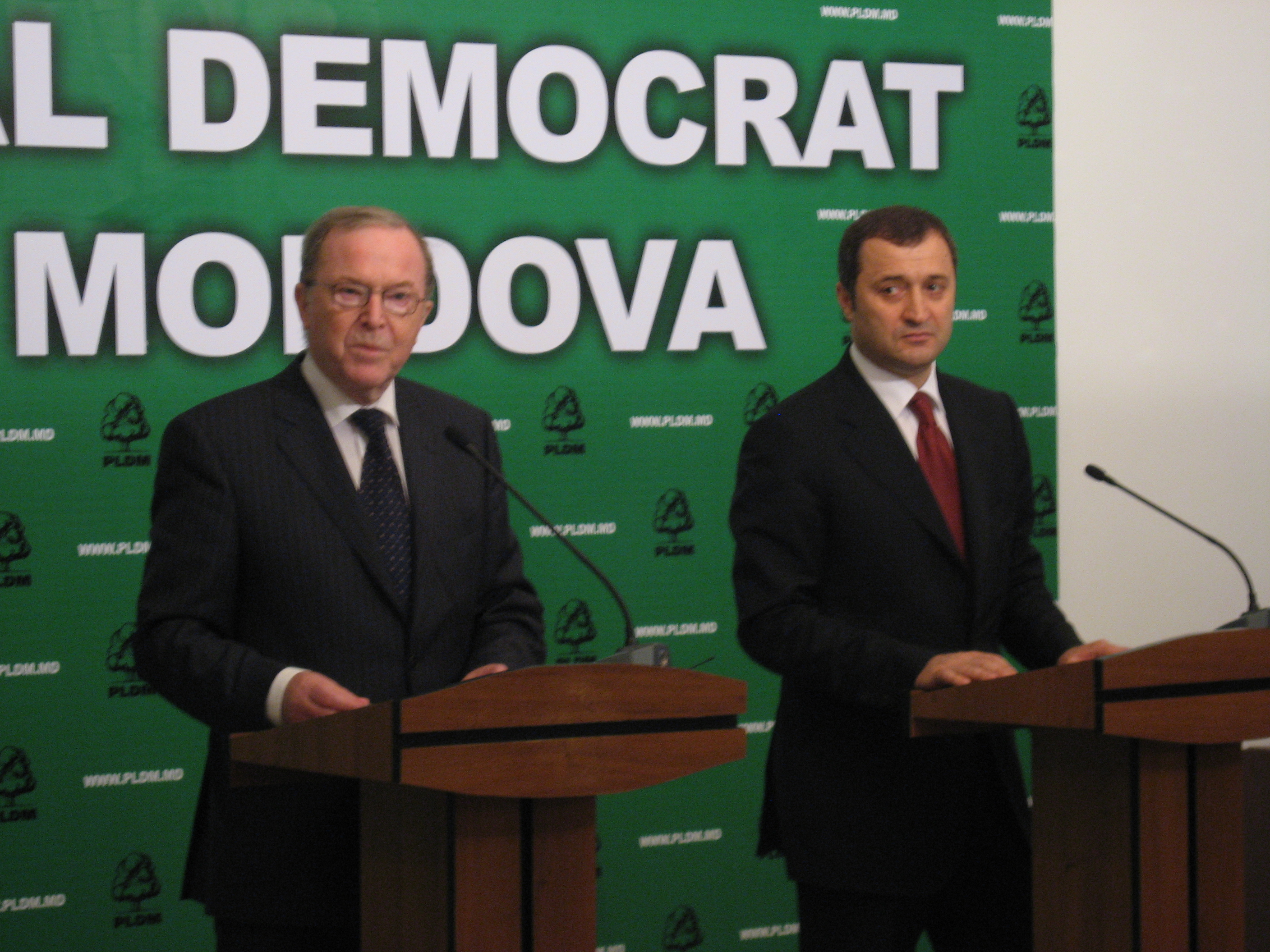
Wilfried Martens and Filat

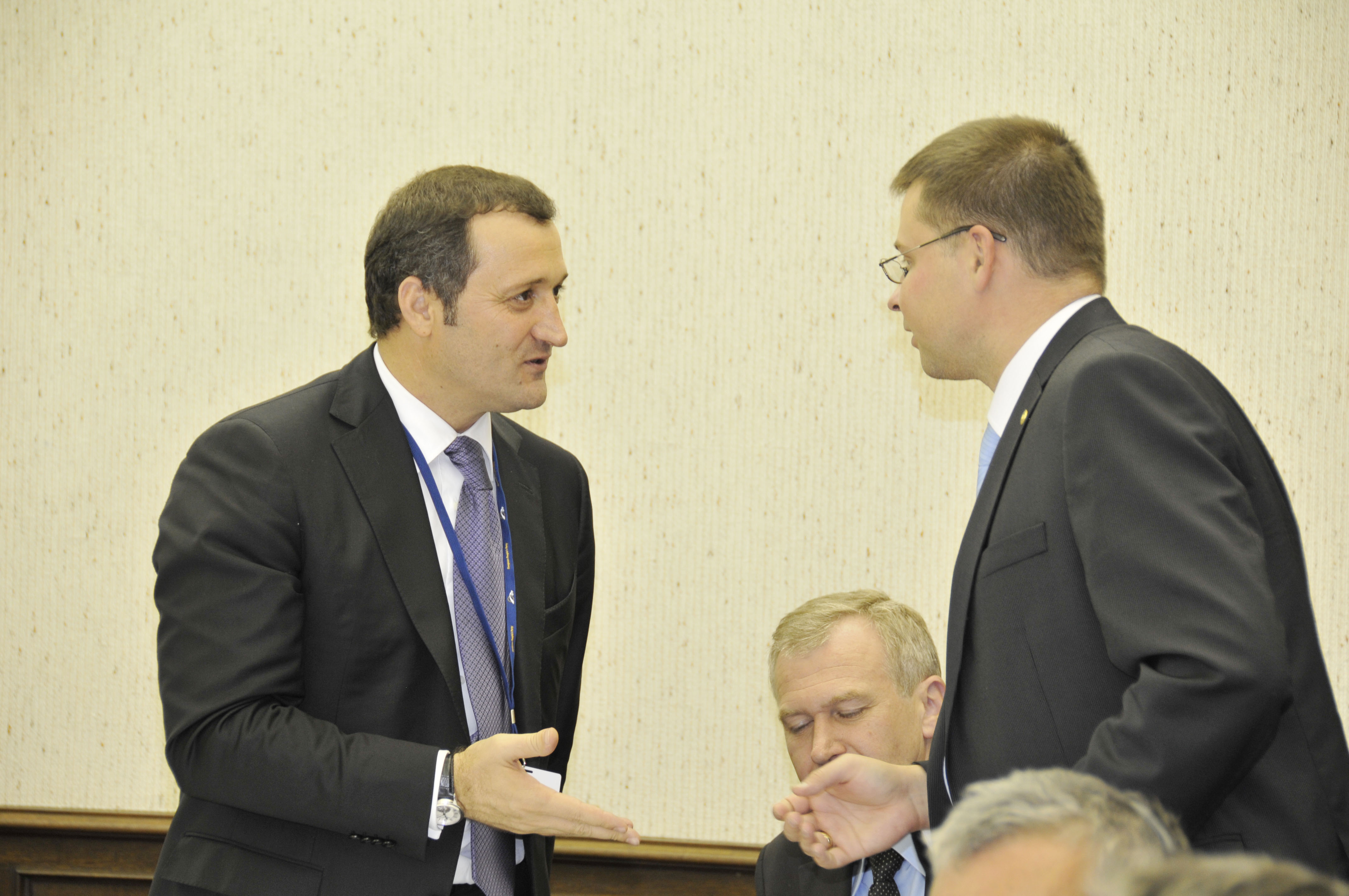
Filat and Valdis Dombrovskis

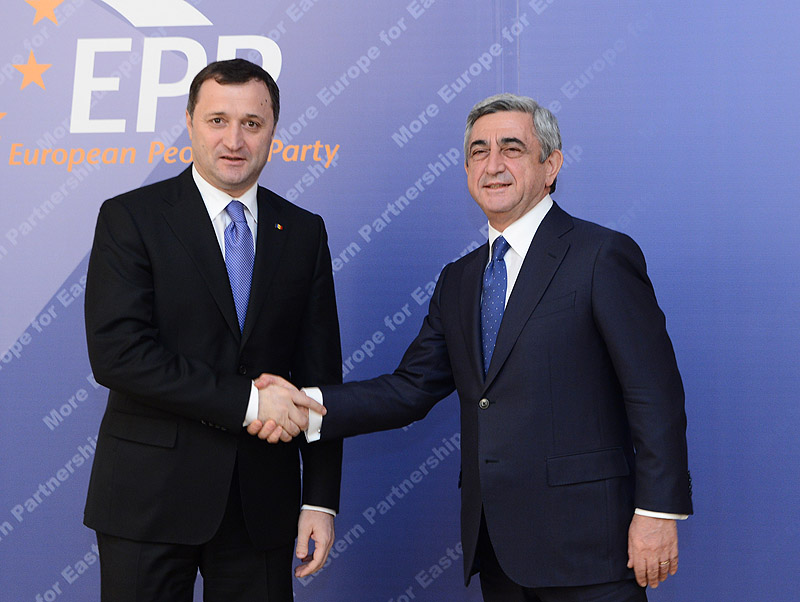
Filat and Serzh Sargsyan

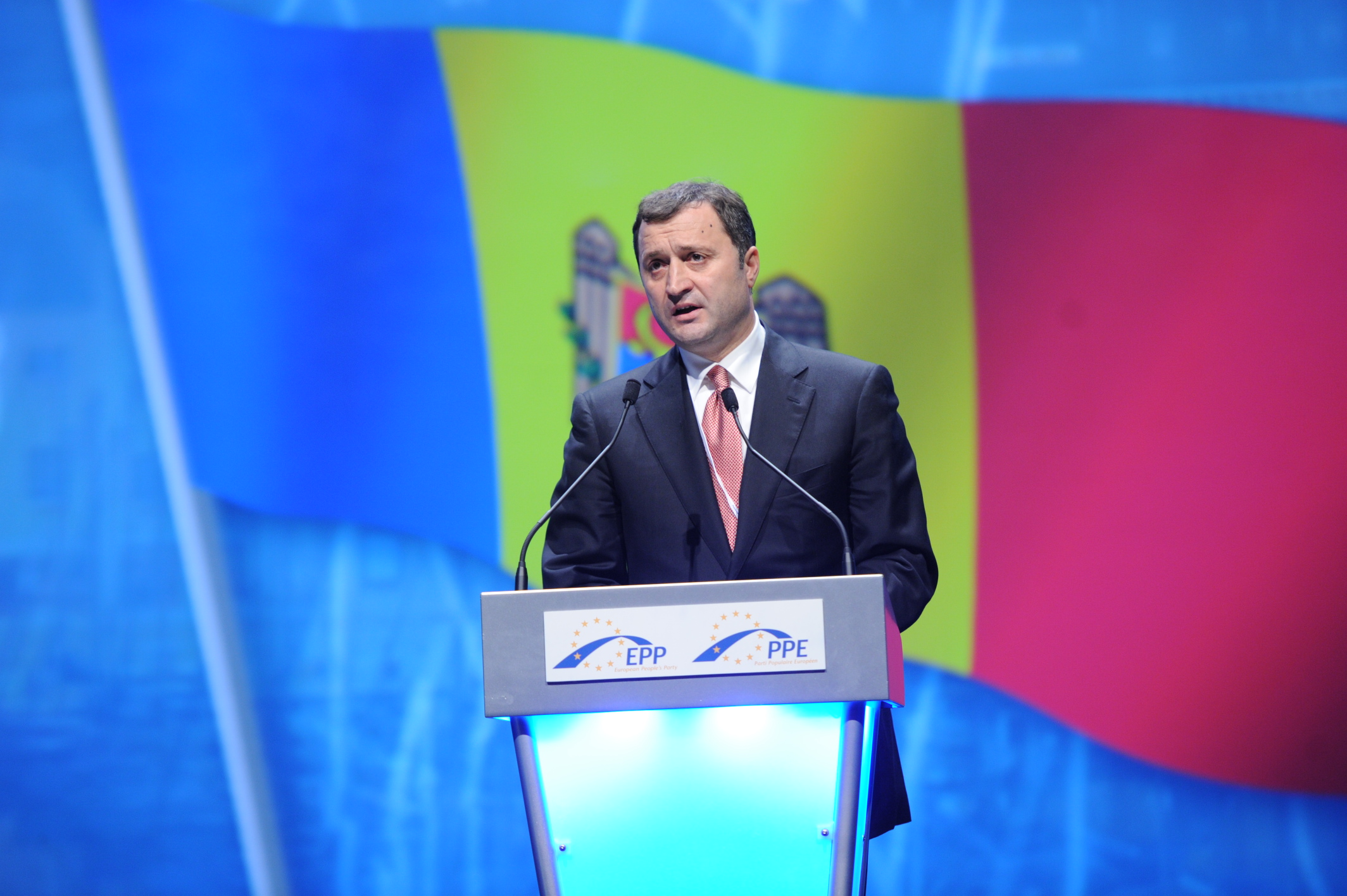
Filat at the EPP Congress Marseille (2011)

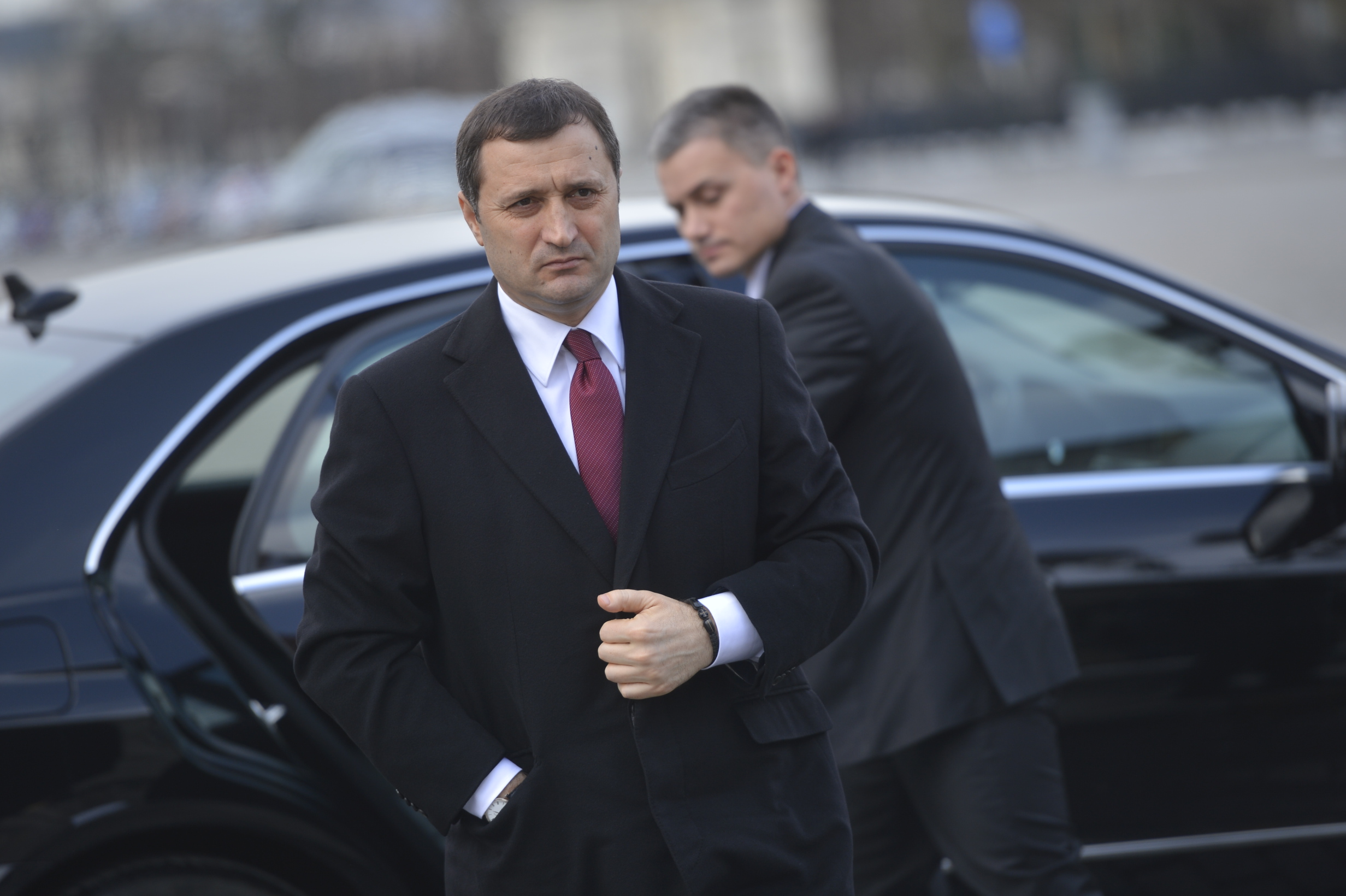
Filat at the EPP Summit (2013)

Political offices
Preceded by Vitalie Pîrlog; Acting	Prime Minister of Moldova; 2009–2013	Succeeded by Iurie Leancă
Preceded by Mihai Ghimpu; Acting	President of Moldova; Acting; 2010	Succeeded by Marian Lupu; Acting
