= Centrist Union of Moldova =

Centrist Union of Moldova Uniunea Centristă din Moldova
- President: Mihai Petrache
- Founded: 15 May 2000
- Headquarters: Chişinău
- Ideology: Social democracy
- Political position: Centre-left
- Colours: Dark blue
- Slogan: Votează altfel (Vote differently)
- Parliament: 0 / 101
- District Presidents: 0 / 32

Website
- ucm.md

The Centrist Union of Moldova (Romanian: Uniunea Centristă din Moldova, UCM) is a political party in Moldova.
