= Alliance for European Integration =

Political coalition

- Abbreviation: AIE
- Dissolved: February 13, 2013
- Type: Centre-right ruling coalition
- Purpose: Governing in Moldova
- Headquarters: Chişinău
- Key people: Vlad Filat (PLDM); Mihai Ghimpu (PL); Marian Lupu (PDM); Serafim Urechean (AMN)

The Alliance for European Integration (Romanian: Alianța pentru Integrare Europeană) was a centre-right, anti-communist coalition that governed Moldova from the July 2009 election until it lost to a no confidence vote in the Parliament on February 13, 2013. It was succeeded by the anti-communist Pro-European Coalition.

== Overall context ==
After the April 2009 election and the civil unrest, the climate in Moldova became very polarised. The parliament failed to elect a new president. For this reason, the parliament was dissolved and snap elections were held. The July 29 polls were won by the Communist Party (PCRM) with 44.7% of the vote. That gave the former ruling party 48 MPs, and the remaining 53 seats in the 101-member chamber went to four opposition parties. 51 votes are needed to elect the speaker and prime minister, and 61 votes to elect the president.

== Membership ==
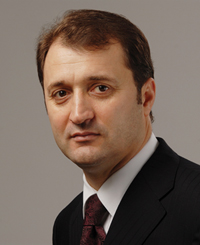
Vlad Filat (PLDM), Prime Minister

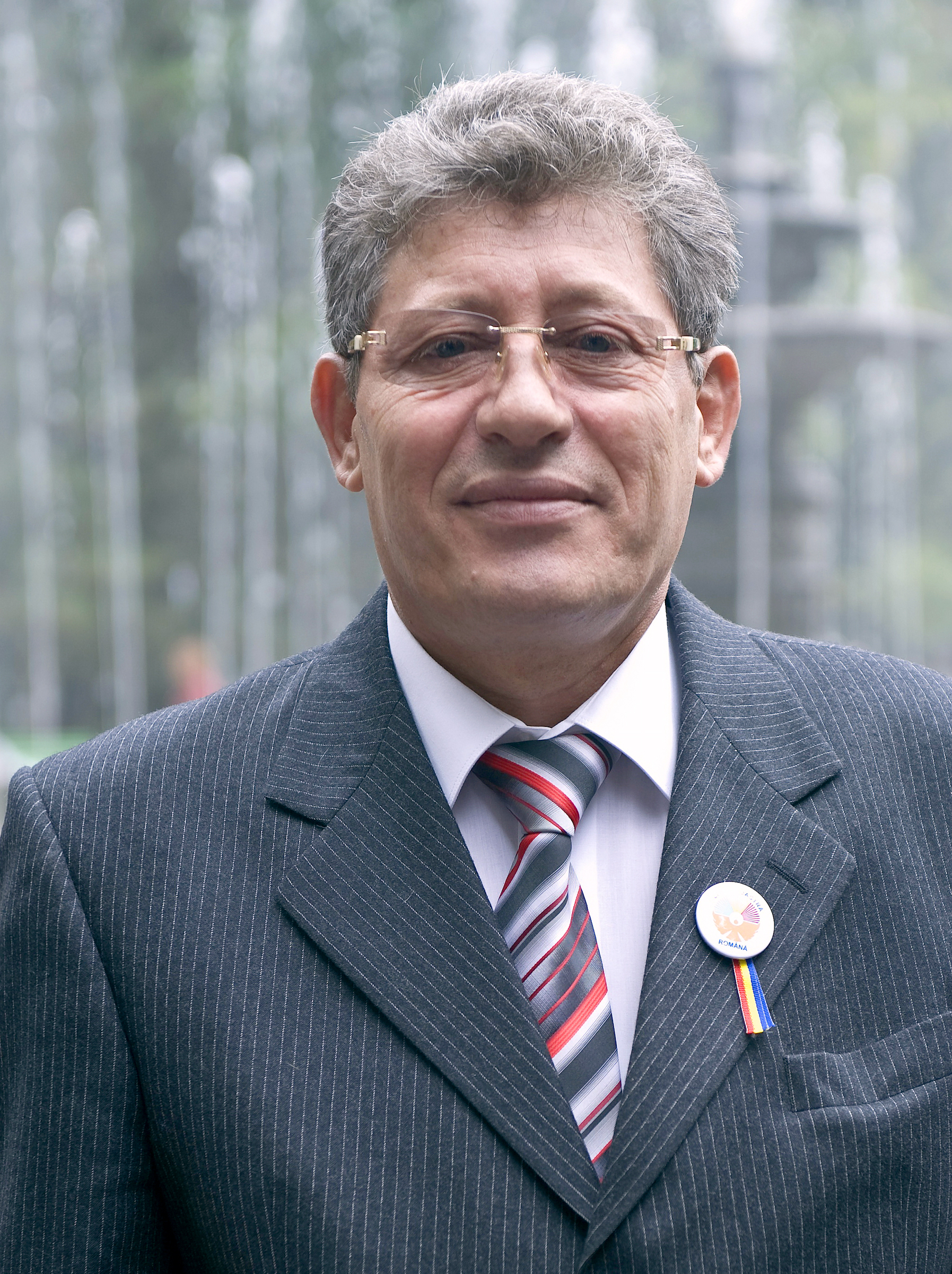
Mihai Ghimpu (PL)

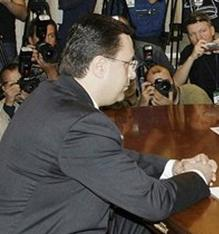
Marian Lupu (PDM)

After the July 2009 elections, the centre-right anti-communist alliance was formed by the following parties: Liberal Democratic Party (18 seats), Liberal Party (15 seats), Democratic Party (13 seats), and Our Moldova Alliance (7 seats). On August 8, 2009, the four Moldovan parties agreed to create a governing coalition that pushed the Communist Party (PCRM) into opposition; the Communists had been in government since 2001. The name of the coalition was decided to be "Alliance for European Integration" (AIE for short). On 25 September 2009, the Alliance for European Integration voted for a pro-European coalition government.

Political forces	Seats	Moldovan Parliament seats after July 2009 polls
Alliance for European Integration (right-wing)	53	
Party of Communists (left-wing)	48	
PCRM (48); PLDM (18); PL (15); PDM (13); AMN (7)

After the 2010 elections, the centre-right anti-communist alliance increased its majority from 53 seats to 59 seats. Although Our Moldova Alliance (AMN) did not return to parliament, the leaders of the three remaining parties of the alliance signed a new coalition agreement on 30 December 2010. Consequently, a new cabinet was installed on 14 January 2011, when an investiture vote took place in parliament.

Political forces	Seats	Moldovan Parliament seats after 2010 polls
Alliance for European Integration	59	
Party of Communists	42	
PCRM (42), PLDM (32), PDM (15), PL (12)

== Goals ==
The leaders of the four parties – Vlad Filat (PLDM), Mihai Ghimpu (PL), Marian Lupu (PDM), and Serafim Urechean (AMN) – signed the 22-point declaration of the Alliance in a news conference on Saturday, August 8, 2009.

The Liberal Democratic Party (PLDM), Liberal Party (PL), Democratic Party (PDM), and Our Moldova Alliance (AMN) have committed themselves to achieving such goals as overcoming the social and economic crisis and ensuring economic growth, reintegrating territories, European integration and promoting a balanced, consistent and responsible foreign policy. The coalition said it wants an association agreement with the European Union. Also, the coalition said it wants strategic relations with both Russia and the United States.

In a press conference on October 21, 2009, Iurie Leancă announced that official negotiations on the association agreement Moldova-EU will start on January 12, 2010.

Commission for constitutional reform in Moldova is a commission instituted on December 1, 2009 by acting President Ghimpu to adopt a new version of the Constitution of Moldova (1994).

On January 14, 2010 President Mihai Ghimpu instituted the Commission for the Study of the Communist Dictatorship in Moldova for studying and formulating a historic assessment of the totalitarian communist regime.

== Moldovan Parliament ==
The first session of Moldova's parliament was scheduled for August 28, one day short of the deadline for the body to convene.

On August 28, 2009, Mihai Ghimpu was elected as the Speaker of the Moldovan Parliament, through secret voting, getting all 53 votes of the Alliance For European Integration.

Mihai Ghimpu on August 28, 2009: "I thank my colleagues for their trust. I hope that while in this position I will cooperate for a free press, independent legal system, and a state of law of which all the Moldovan citizens will be proud of."

== Prime Minister of Moldova ==
The Constitutional Court of Moldova confirmed the legitimacy of Mihai Ghimpu's position as acting president, which gave him the right to nominate a prime minister. On the same day, Ghimpu signed a decree nominating Filat for the office of prime minister. Earlier on September 17, the parliament approved a new government structure; according to the draft structure, the number of ministries remains unchanged at 16 but their names and responsibilities have been changed.

The Alliance cabinet of Vlad Filat took office after winning the approval of parliament on September 25, 2009. Filat said that his first official visit as premier will be made to Brussels. He added that the agenda of the first official meetings will include visits to Paris, Berlin, Bucharest, and Kyiv.

== President of Moldova ==
On September 11, 2009, Mihai Ghimpu became the acting president of Moldova. The interim position was possible following the resignation of Moldovan President, Vladimir Voronin, announced in the morning of 11 September 2009 on the public broadcaster Moldova 1.

The resignation letter was sent to the Parliament secretariat and by a vote of 52 deputies in the plenary session of the legislature was declared vacant the post of the President of the Republic of Moldova. Therefore, in accordance with Article 91 of the Constitution of 1994, which provides that "the responsibility of the office shall devolve ad interim on the President of Parliament or the Prime Minister, in that priority order", Mihai Ghimpu becomes the interim President of the Republic of Moldova until a new president will be elected by the Parliament.

One of the goals of the alliance was to elect the new president. The candidate of the alliance was subsequently decided to be Marian Lupu. The four parties needed to elect a new president which was impossible without having the support of at least 8 Communist (PCRM) MPs.

The critics close to the Communists (PCRM) said that the new coalition was in fact a resurrection of the former Alliance for Democracy and Reforms (ADR), which mostly failed the expectations of its voters, due to many reasons. After 1999, the Party of Communists (PCRM) used very successfully the incoherent activity of the Alliance for Democracy and Reforms (ADR) for discrediting any form of political coalition formed without them.

== Issues ==
=== Soviet Occupation Day ===
Mihai Ghimpu, interim president of Moldova in 2010, decreed June 28 as Day of Soviet Occupation and Commemoration of the Victims of the Communist Totalitarian Regime to remember the Soviet occupation on June 28, 1940. The move was met with disapproval and calls for the decree's revocation inside the ruling coalition, and with calls for Ghimpu's resignation among the opposition parties. Dorin Chirtoacă, mayor of Chişinău and member of the same party as Ghimpu, ordered the erection of a memorial stone in the National Assembly Square, in front of the parliament building, where a Lenin monument used to stand. The members of the coalitions argued that the time had not come for such a decree and that it would only help the communists win more votes. The Academy of Sciences of Moldova declared that "in the view of recent disagreements regarding June 28, 1940 [...] we must take action and inform the public opinion about the academic community views". The Academy declared that: "Archival documents and historical research of international experts shows that the annexation of Bessarabia and Northern Bukovina was designed and built by Soviet Command as a military occupation of these territories. Ordinance of Interim President Michael Ghimpu reflects, in principle, the historical truth". the Constitutional Court cancelled Ghimpu's decree on July 12, 2010.

=== Constitutional referendum ===
The constitutional referendum aimed at breaking the political stalemate failed on September 5, 2010, following a low voter turnout. No further referendum can be called to change the constitution for direct elections of the president for another two years. The head of the observer mission from the Parliamentary Assembly of the Council of Europe, Andreas Gross, praised the referendum as being well organised and corresponding to democratic standards.

On 15 January 2012, the leaders of the Alliance made a joint statement announcing that a constitutional referendum would be held in April, 2012. Prime Minister Vlad Filat said that "a referendum on the amendment of the constitution will be initiated in order to give people the opportunity to rectify the constitutional deficiencies that have been triggering endless political crises." Acting President Marian Lupu added that: "Moldova's president will be elected within a month after the validation of the referendum's outcome.". Liberal leader Mihai Ghimpu then said that the amendment to the constitution was the only solution to the political crisis.

=== 2010 election ===
After the referendum failed, the Alliance announced on September 6 that it would consult the Constitutional Court of Moldova on dissolving parliament and holding a new election.

== See also ==
- Alliance (Sweden)
- Pădurea Domnească case

== Gallery ==
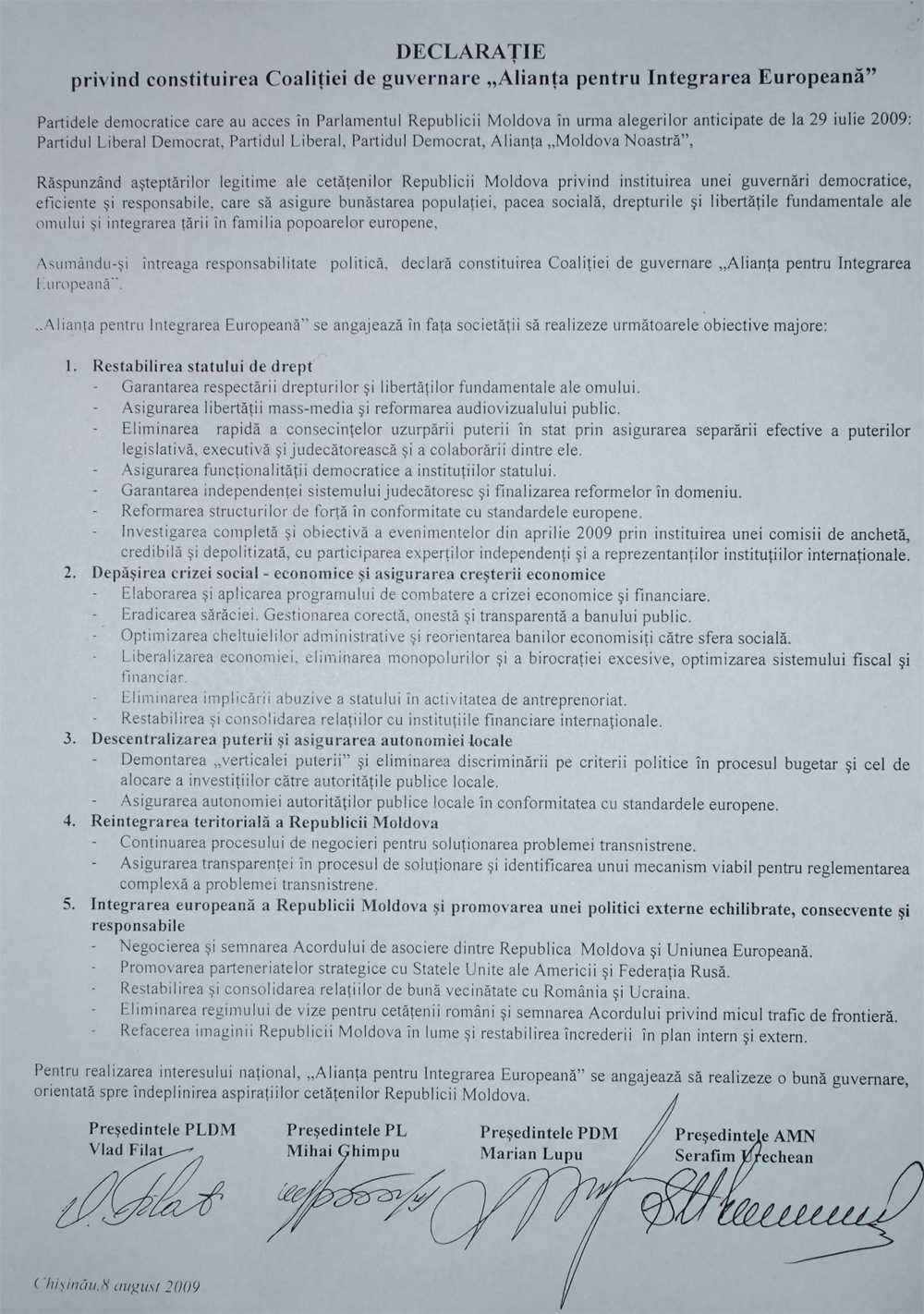
The declaration document of the Alliance for European Integration

Total votes won by the opposition parties (PL, PLDM, AMN) which passed the 6% electoral threshold in the April 2009 election by raion and municipality

The results of the Moldovan parliamentary election (July 2009) at municipality and raion level

Seat distribution graphs (in German)

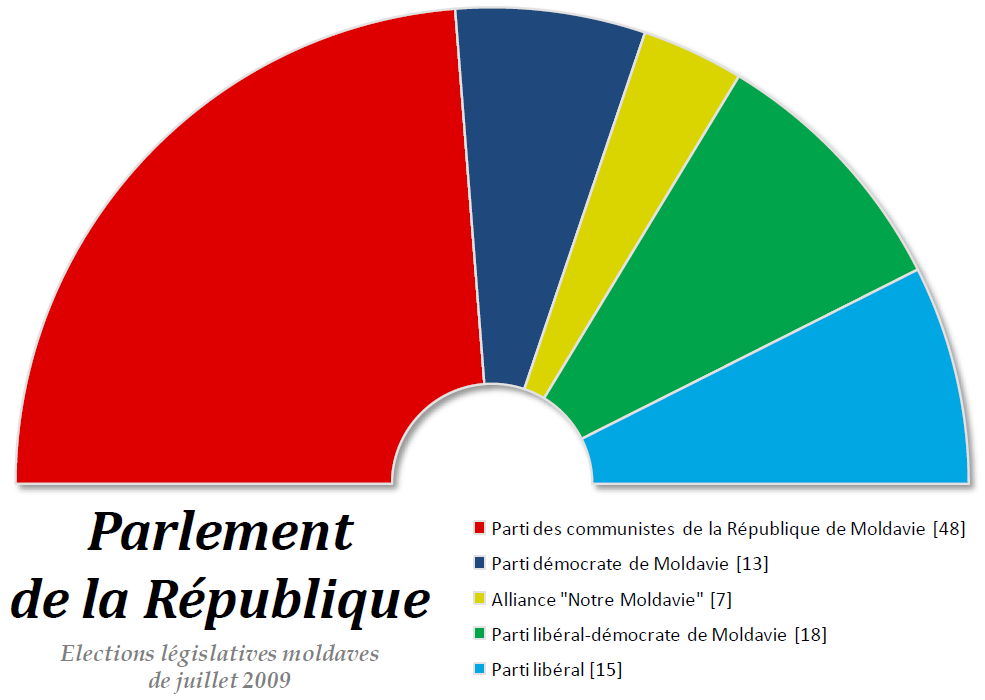
Seat distribution pie chart (in French)
