= Liberal Democratic Party of Moldova =

Liberal Democratic Party of Moldova Partidul Liberal Democrat din Moldova
- President: Vladimir Filat
- Founder: Vladimir Filat
- Founded: 8 October 2007; 18 years ago
- Split from: PDM
- Headquarters: 19/1 Mihai Eminescu Street, Chișinău
- Youth wing: OTLDM
- Membership (2019): 6,476
- Ideology: Conservatism; Liberal conservatism Pro-Europeanism; Moldovan–Romanian unionism
- Political position: Centre-right
- European affiliation: European People's Party (observer)
- International affiliation: International Democrat Union (formerly)
- Colours: Green
- Parliament: 0 / 101
- District Presidents: 0 / 32

Website
- pldm.md

The Liberal Democratic Party of Moldova (Romanian: Partidul Liberal Democrat din Moldova, PLDM) is a conservative political party in Moldova. The party is led by Tudor Deliu. Until 2016, PLDM was led by Vlad Filat, who was Prime Minister of Moldova from 2009 to 2013, in two cabinets. Immediately after the 2014 parliamentary elections, with 21 seats in the Moldovan Parliament, PLDM was the largest of the three democratic pro-European parliamentary parties.

The party's founding congress was held on 8 December 2007 and Vlad Filat was elected as president. The initiative group of the party was centered on Filat, who had previously been a prominent member of the Democratic Party of Moldova (PDM), who was disappointed with the direction taken by that political party under Dumitru Diacov's leadership. Soon, many local branches of the Christian Democratic Popular Party (PPCD), disappointed with Iurie Roșca's policy of cooperation with the Communist Party of Moldova (PCRM), joined PLDM en masse. The party also attracted many prominent members of civil society.

At its first election, in April 2009, PLDM won 15 seats, which increased to 18 three months later, after which Filat became the Prime Minister, leading the Alliance for European Integration (AIE). In November 2010, the PLDM jumped to 32 seats, becoming the dominant non-Communist party. The AIE was replaced by the Pro-European Coalition in 2013, when Iurie Leancă replaced Filat as Prime Minister, with Filat remaining as the party chairman.

== History ==
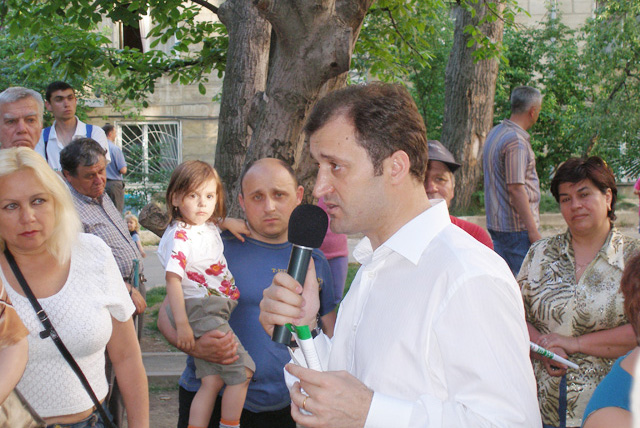
Vlad Filat

On October 8, 2007, the initiative group composed of 53 leaders renowned in their fields, launched the idea of creating the Liberal Democratic Party of Moldova. The leaders of the group included: Vlad Filat, Deputy in the Parliament of the Republic of Moldova; Alexandru Tănase, member of the Bar Association of the Republic of Moldova, Chișinău Municipal Council adviser; Mihai Godea, Director of CONTACT Center; Iulian Fruntasu, Director of European Initiatives Programme at Soros Foundation;, Angela Braşoveanu, director of "Punkt" magazine; Veaceslav Negruță, consultant, Project on Improving Competitiveness; Valeriu Streleț, Director of "Bioprotect" company; Veronica Lupu, president of the Association "Women for Contemporary Society"; Andrei Malașevschi, Cantemir district president; Nicolae Platon, chief of the State Tax Inspectorate; Liliana Bolocan, head of the Department of Psychology, Institute for Continuing Education; Ion Sturza, vice-president of Nisporeni district; Victor Rosca, director of the Tolerance and Pluralism Promotion Center, etc.

In their statements, the initiative group members acknowledged the profound crisis in the Republic of Moldova and the inability of political parties to face the situation. The Liberal Democratic Party of Moldova emerged as a capable alternative to start the process of moral reorganization of the political class, rebirth and modernization of the country, reestablishment of the society back on its natural track of democratic development.

For two months, over 20,000 citizens from all districts of the country submitted applications to join the Liberal Democratic Party. Organizations were created in all territorial-administrative units of the second level in Chișinău, Bălți, Tiraspol, Bender and Gagauzia.

The first founding Congress of the Liberal Democratic Party of Moldova took place on December 8, 2007 in Chișinău. It was attended by 592 delegates from 38 local organizations. The Congress approved the Program and Statute and elected the governing and control bodies of the party. The second Congress of the Liberal Democratic Party of Moldova took place on September 27, 2008, in Bălți. It was attended by 547 delegates from local party organizations. The Congress debated the issues related to the work of the Liberal Democratic Party of Moldova between the congresses, amending and supplementing the Statute of PLDM, as well as issues related to Moldova current domestic situation. The Liberal Democratic Teachers Association was formed within the party on September 13, 2008 and on October 11, 2008 – the Liberal Democratic Doctors and Pharmacists Association. Formation of socio-professional associations within the party is stipulated in the statute of the Liberal Democratic Party of Moldova.

The Founding Conference of the Youth Organization of the Liberal Democratic Party of Moldova took place on November 15, 2008. It was attended by 517 delegates from all country districts. The delegates at the conference approved the Regulation of the Youth Organization of the Liberal Democratic Party of Moldova and elected the administration of the organization. The Conference approved the "Green Charter for Youth" - a programmatic document that includes solutions to key issues that young people face.

On December 27, 2008, the Liberal Democratic Women's Organization was created within the PLDM, and on January 24, 2009 – the Association of Elderly Persons. Also, the Liberal Democratic Association of People active in the cultural field was created on January 31, 2008 within the framework of the party.

At the parliamentary elections of April 5, 2009, PLDM obtained 12.43% of the votes, with 15 seats in the Parliament of Moldova. At the early elections of July 29, PLDM gained 16.57% of the votes and was represented in the Parliament by 18 deputies.

Together with deputies from the LP, DPM and AMN, the Liberal Democratic Party of Moldova formed the new majority coalition in the Legislative - the Alliance for European Integration. On September 25, 2009, the Parliament gave the vote of trust to the Government and Prime Minister Vlad Filat, president of PLDM. Besides the Prime Minister, PLDM is represented in the government by six ministers: Iurie Leancă, Alexandru Tănase, Veaceslav Negruță, Victor Bodiu, Vladimir Hotineanu, Victor Catan.

The Third Extraordinary Congress of the PLDM took place on December 19, 2009 in Chișinău. It was attended by 1,800 delegates from local party organizations, representing over 35,000 members of the PLDM. The delegates to the congress made changes in the political program of the party, given the new status of LDPM as the governing party.

Following the parliamentary elections of November 28, 2010, PLDM is governing. The Second Filat Cabinet has seven Liberal Democratic ministers.

In 2009, the PLDM applied for membership in the pan-European centre-right European People's Party (EPP). Since February 10, 2011 the party has held observer status in this organisation.

On April 10, 2011, the fourth congress of the Liberal Democratic Party of Moldova took place in Chișinău. It was attended by over 2,400 delegates. The resignation of the senior vice-president of PLDM, Alexandru Tănase, was accepted during the forum. Instead, Iurie Leancă was appointed in that position. Also, Victor Bodiu was announced as a candidate for the position of mayor of Chișinău in the local elections of June 5, 2011.

The Congress adopted amendments to the Statute and Program of PLDM and approved the merger agreement by absorption of the Party Alliance Our Moldova.

== Ideology and political platform ==
According to its statute, the Liberal Democratic Party is a center-right party with conservative doctrine. The strategic programmatic goal set by this party is the reconstruction and modernization of the Republic of Moldova, as well as the establishment of rule-of-law state and efficient market economy. In its program, the Liberal Democratic Party aims at becoming the main driver for overcoming economic, social and civilization gaps, which separate Moldova from Europe of the 21st century.

According to the party's political program on its website, freedom, the rule of law, democracy, equality, responsibility, solidarity and subsidiarity are their values. The party believes that freedom it "constitutes the inalienable natural right of every individual and the cornerstone of prosperity and progress". The party believes that the rule of law is the Moldovan Constitution. According to their website: "Normative acts issued by the public administration arise from the constitutional provisions and existing legislation. All actions taken by any citizen, institution or legal entity are carried out within and within the limits of the existing legal field."

The party believes, according to their political program, that democracy is the "fundamental option for ensuring modern administration", with characteristics such as the multi-party system, the freedom of non-governmental organizations, free and universal suffrage, the separation of powers in the state, and a developed parliamentary system. Equality is a universal value highlights the opportunities that citizens have and their exercises of freedom, regardless of race, gender, ethnicity, or religion. However, the party also believes in limiting freedom "so that it does not degenerate into undermining the collective values on which society is based."

The party believes in solidarity, which "constitutes the essence of the social nature of the individual and the assurance of the human condition." According to the party's program, in societies, where citizens realize their individual and professional aspirations at the interface between responsibility, individualism and solidarity, a social formula is reached that contributes to the continuous modernization of the political and social domain. Human capital, in the form of civic culture, not only individual, contributes to the maximization of general well-being.

The party's political program also supports the idea that citizens should be allowed to govern themselves. In matters of governance, the individual takes precedence over the local community, and the local community over the state. The party believes that the state should provide communities with the opportunity and the mechanism to make decisions, and larger communities should provide smaller ones with the means to decide their future based on local resources and needs.

== Political support ==
PLDM's voters tend to be young and well-educated, and from high socio-economic classes. They are the party most supported by people that have worked abroad, as well as unemployed people. 43% of the party's voters have a high level of education.

The PLDM is overwhelmingly supported by young people; 43% of their support comes from people aged 18 to 29, making them the party most dependent on young people's votes. Like every major party except the Communists, the PLDM's voters are overwhelmingly ethnically Romanian, 15% of whom support the PLDM. However, unlike the PLM or PDM, the PLDM does receive some support from ethnic Russians, 5% of whom support the PLDM.

== Leadership ==
The National Political Council includes 95 members and the Permanent Central Bureau includes 18 members.

== Activities ==
The campaign "Moldova without Voronin, Moldova without Communists", launched on January 30, 2008, includes extensive activities and demonstrations, public debates, meetings with citizens, legislative initiatives, petitions, etc. Those are aimed at dismantling the communist authoritarian regime, through legal means. In the first stage, the Liberal Democratic Party organized a Republican referendum regarding constitutional amendments to the mode of electing the President of the Republic of Moldova and Members of Parliament. The Liberal Democrats propose that the president be elected through general and direct suffrage, and deputies be elected based on a mixed system: 50 deputies elected in single-member constituencies and 51 deputies - on party lists. The meeting of the formation of the Initiative Group for conducting the republican referendum on constitutional change took place on February 23, 2008 in Chișinău, with over 5,000 citizens from all districts of the country.

Within the period stipulated by law, over 224,176 signatures in favor of initiating a referendum were collected. Based on the constitutional norm, this number of signatures is sufficient to initiate a referendum. However, to block the initiative of amending the Constitution, at the end of the campaign, the CEC speculated a loophole in the Constitution and said that 340,000 signatures are necessary to initiate a referendum. In these circumstances, the PLDM decided not to submit lists to the CEC.

Another major action launched by the Liberal Democratic Party is the campaign to speed up the signing of the convention on small border traffic. In order to inform citizens in the border area about the provisions and facilities offered by the convention, on May 11, 2008, PLDM organized meetings with citizens in 13 border districts, which were attended by over 5000 people. On May 25, 2008, the PLDM held a meeting in Chișinău to support the convention, which was attended by more than seven thousand citizens. On June 15, the Liberal Democratic Party organized 30 meetings with citizens from border towns, which were attended by about 5,000 people. Following the PLDM appeal to the local authorities, so that they support the signing of the convention by special decisions, ten district councils and Chișinău municipal council, together accounting for 1 691 000 citizens, urged the Government to sign the convention. From July 21 to September 20, 2008, PLDM organized 86 meetings with citizens in the border areas and distributed 200,000 leaflets with information about the convention and the benefits for the residents of that area. On October 1, 2008, the Liberal Democratic Party submitted to the European Commission Delegation in Chișinău, a memorandum addressed to the European Parliament and European Commission, which requests European forums involvement in order to ensure that the convention on small border traffic is signed.

PLDM was actively involved in helping the victims of the floods in the summer of 2008. In addition to the significant material and financial support, the victims were helped to evacuate water from households and cellars. PLDM leader, deputy Vlad Filat submitted a legislative proposal to the Permanent Bureau of Parliament, aimed at exempting the flood-affected individuals from land and real estate tax.

On October 26, in the square of the Great National Assembly, the Liberal Democratic Party held a large protest against the bankruptive policy of the communist government in the agricultural sector titled "The ruination of agriculture - destroying the country." The protest was attended by over 10,000 citizens from all districts of the country, employed in agriculture, but also doctors, teachers, local government representatives, people active in the cultural field, who are not indifferent towards the fate of the Republic of Moldova.

On November 9, 2008, the Liberal Democratic Party of Moldova held a national public action to support independent media and citizens' right to fair and objective information. The event was held simultaneously in Chișinău, Bălți and all regional centers, involving about 5,000 people. The actions of support of independent media organized by PLDM concluded with the adoption of resolutions, which, accompanied by a memorandum were submitted to the Council of Europe, European Parliament and European Commission.

On December 8, 2008, PLDM launched the national action "The case of the communist government", aimed at conducting a thorough analysis of all actions undertaken by the Communist Party during the eight years of governance. The first volume of this file has 765 pages and presents in detail and brings arguments proving the wrongdoings of Voronin's regime in the field of human rights, actions to undermine the national economy, entrepreneurship, business interference, illegal privatization, use of state administrative resources, defalcation of funds and budgets, serious foreign policy errors, actions that obstructed and manipulated the media.

On December 21, 2008, the Liberal Democratic Party of Moldova held in the square of the Great National Assembly a national action in support of the citizens’ rights and freedoms, independent media and in support of PRO TV channel. The event was attended by over 10,000 citizens of Chișinău and Bălți, from all country districts. A resolution was adopted at the meeting, which requested respect for the citizens’ rights and freedoms stipulated by the Constitution of the Republic of Moldova and the European Convention on Human Rights and Fundamental Freedoms; ending the actions of harassment and intimidation of journalists and independent media.

On January 25, 2009, the Liberal Democratic Party held a meeting with citizens from Lipcani, in order to speed up the opening of the customs point Lipcani-Rădăuți Prut. The meeting was attended by people from Briceni, Edineț, Ocnița and Donduşeni. They expressed dissatisfaction towards the authorities who do not take the necessary steps to deploy the bridge over the Prut river, which created circulation problems for about 100 000 citizens from the northern districts of Moldova. On February 22, 2009, in the square of the Great National Assembly, the Liberal Democratic Party held a protest regarding the violation of electoral rights of Moldovan citizens who live abroad. The event was attended by over 20,000 people, members and supporters of the Liberal Party Democratic of Moldova, citizens from all districts of the country, from municipalities of Chișinău and Bălți.

On March 22, 2009, in the square of the Great National Assembly, the Liberal Democratic Party organized an ample action entitled "Vote without fear", which was attended by over 30,000 citizens, members and supporters of the PLDM from the entire country. The purpose of the action was to encourage citizens to free themselves from fear and vote in full accordance with their political views. On April 4, the Liberal Democratic Party launched the first volume of the "Case of communism", which includes analyses, research, investigations, articles, reports about abuses committed by the communist government and its henchmen in the period of 2001–2008. The file has 765 pages and describes in detail and with arguments the wrongdoings committed by Voronin's regime. On June 26, the Youth Organization of the Liberal Democratic Party of Moldova launched the information campaign "The truth" in order to inform citizens about the events that took place in the country after the April 5 elections. The campaign reached 26 districts and 360 villages of Moldova.

On April 12, 2009, together with the LP and MNA, PLDM organized a protest against communist repressions. The event was attended by over 10,000 people, who condemned the arrest and maltreatment of young people following the events of April 7.

On July 3, 2009, PLDM created the Fund "April 2009". The proceeds from this fund were used to help the young people mistreated by the police and the families of those deceased. Also, the proceeds were used to buy a house for the family of Valeriu Boboc, who died on April 7.

== PLDM logo ==
Old PLDM logo

New PLDM logo

The logo of the Liberal Democratic Party (PLDM) represents a secular oak, with broad crown, branched lush foliage, vigorous trunk. PLDM acronym underpins the oak. The stem and roots are brown and the foliage is green.

The oak has the following meanings: force, power, solidity, resistance, persistence. The oak symbol is interwoven with Moldovan national history.

== Election results ==
=== Parliament ===
Parliament
Election	Leader	Performance					Rank	Government
Election	Leader	Votes	%	± pp	Seats	+/–	Rank	Government
2009 (Apr)	Vlad Filat	191,113	12.43%	New	15 / 101	New	3rd	Opposition (PCRM)
2009 (Jul)	Vlad Filat	262,028	16.57%	▲4.14	18 / 101	▲3	▲2nd	Coalition (AIE: PLDM-PDM-PL-AMN)
2010	Vlad Filat	506,253	29.42%	▲12.85	32 / 101	▲14	2nd	Coalition (AIE: PLDM-PDM-PL)
2010	Vlad Filat	506,253	29.42%	▲12.85	32 / 101	▲14	2nd	Coalition (CPE: PLDM-PDM-PLR)
2014	Vlad Filat	322,201	20.16%	▼9.26	23 / 101	▼9	2nd	Coalition (APME: PLDM-PDM)
2014	Vlad Filat	322,201	20.16%	▼9.26	23 / 101	▼9	2nd	Coalition (AIE III: PLDM-PDM-PL)
2014	Vlad Filat	322,201	20.16%	▼9.26	23 / 101	▼9	2nd	Opposition (PDM-PPEM-PL)
2019	Tudor Deliu	380,181	26.84% (ACUM (Note: NOW Platform DA and PAS won 26 seats - 15 went to the PAS - 11 to the PPDA))	▲6.68	0 / 101	▼23	▼3rd	Extra-parliamentary support (PSRM-ACUM: PAS-PPPDA)
2019	Tudor Deliu	380,181	26.84% (ACUM)	▲6.68	0 / 101	▼23	▼3rd	Extra-parliamentary (PSRM-PDM)
2021	Vlad Filat	endorsed PAS			0 / 101	Steady	–	TBD

== President ==
President
Election	Candidate	First round		Second round		Result
Election	Candidate	Votes	%	Votes	%	Result
2009 (May–Jun)	Boycotted the elections					No winner
2009 (Nov–Dec)	Endorsed Marian Lupu (PDM)	53 (Note: President was elected by 101 members of Parliament. 61 votes were needed to win)	52.48%	53 (Note: President was elected by 101 members of Parliament. 61 votes were needed to win)	52.48%	No winner
2011–2012	Endorsed Nicolae Timofti (AIE)	62 (Note: President was elected by 101 members of Parliament)	61.39%			Elected ✓
2016	Endorsed Maia Sandu (PAS)	549,152	38.71%	766,593	47.89%	Lost ✗
2020	Tudor Deliu	18,486	1.37%			Lost ✗

=== Local elections ===
==== Department and municipality councils ====
Election year	# of votes	% of votes	# of overall seats won	+/–
2011	312,011	22.6	300 / 1,120	
2015	235,113	18.3	259 / 1,116	▼41
2019	55,275	5.14	66 / 1,108	▼193

==== City and countryside councils ====
Election year	# of votes	% of votes	# of overall seats won	+/–
2011	281,667	25.4	3,039 / 10,630	
2015	236,097	22.2	2,746 / 10,570	▼293

==== Mayors ====
Election year	mayors	% of overall mayor mandates	# of overall mandates won	+/–
2011	287	32.0	287 / 898	
2015	286	31.8	286 / 898	▼1
2019	48	5.14	48 / 898	▼238
2023	34	3.8	34 / 898	▼14
