= Aroma (disambiguation) =

An aroma is a volatilised chemical compound that humans or other animals perceive by the sense of olfaction (the sense of smell).

Aroma may also refer to:

- Aroma Espresso Bar, an Israeli espresso bar and coffee shop chain
- Aroma, Indiana, United States
- Aroma, Missouri, United States
- Aroma (Caria), a town of ancient Caria, now in Turkey
- Aroma (winery), a Moldovan wine producer
- Aroma Province, La Paz, Bolivia
- Aroma Rural LLG, Papua New Guinea
- Aroma, Sudan, a town in Kassala State, Sudan
- Aroma of wine
- Aroma Housewares, branded as Aroma, is a cookware producer
- Aroma (skipper), a genus of skipper butterflies
- Hua Xiren, a fictional character from the Chinese novel Dream of the Red Chamber

== See also ==
- Aromas (disambiguation)
- Aroma Park, in the U.S. state of Illinois
- Aroma Township, also in the U.S. state of Illinois
- Aromaa, Finnish surname
