= Cricova (winery) =

Moldovan winery

Coordinates: 47.133°N 28.850°E

- Location: Cricova, Moldova
- Wine region: Moldovan wine
- Known for: Kodrinskoie sparkling
- Varietal: Cabernet Sauvignon
- Other attractions: Underground wine cellars
- Distribution: International
- Tasting: Underground tasting rooms
- Website: cricova.md

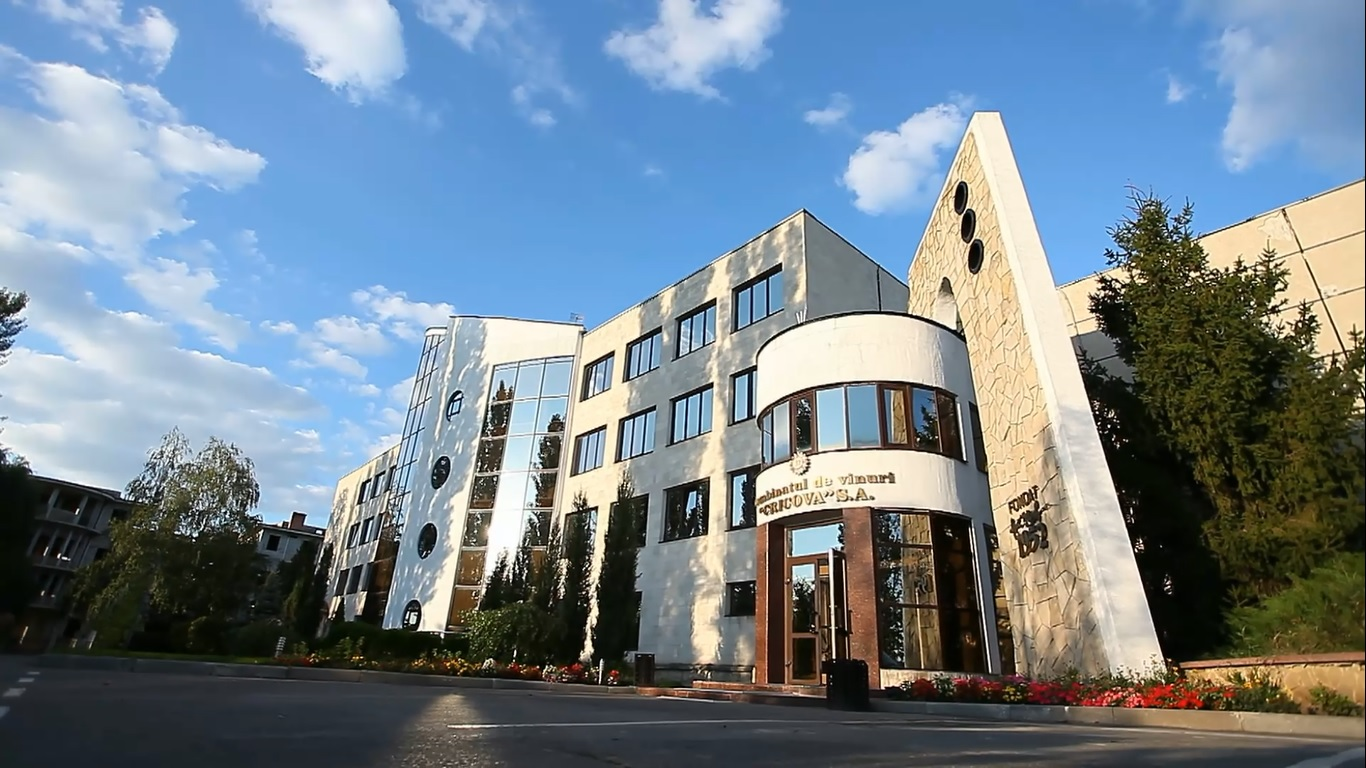
Cricova S.A. Wine Compound

Logo of Cricova

The European Hall

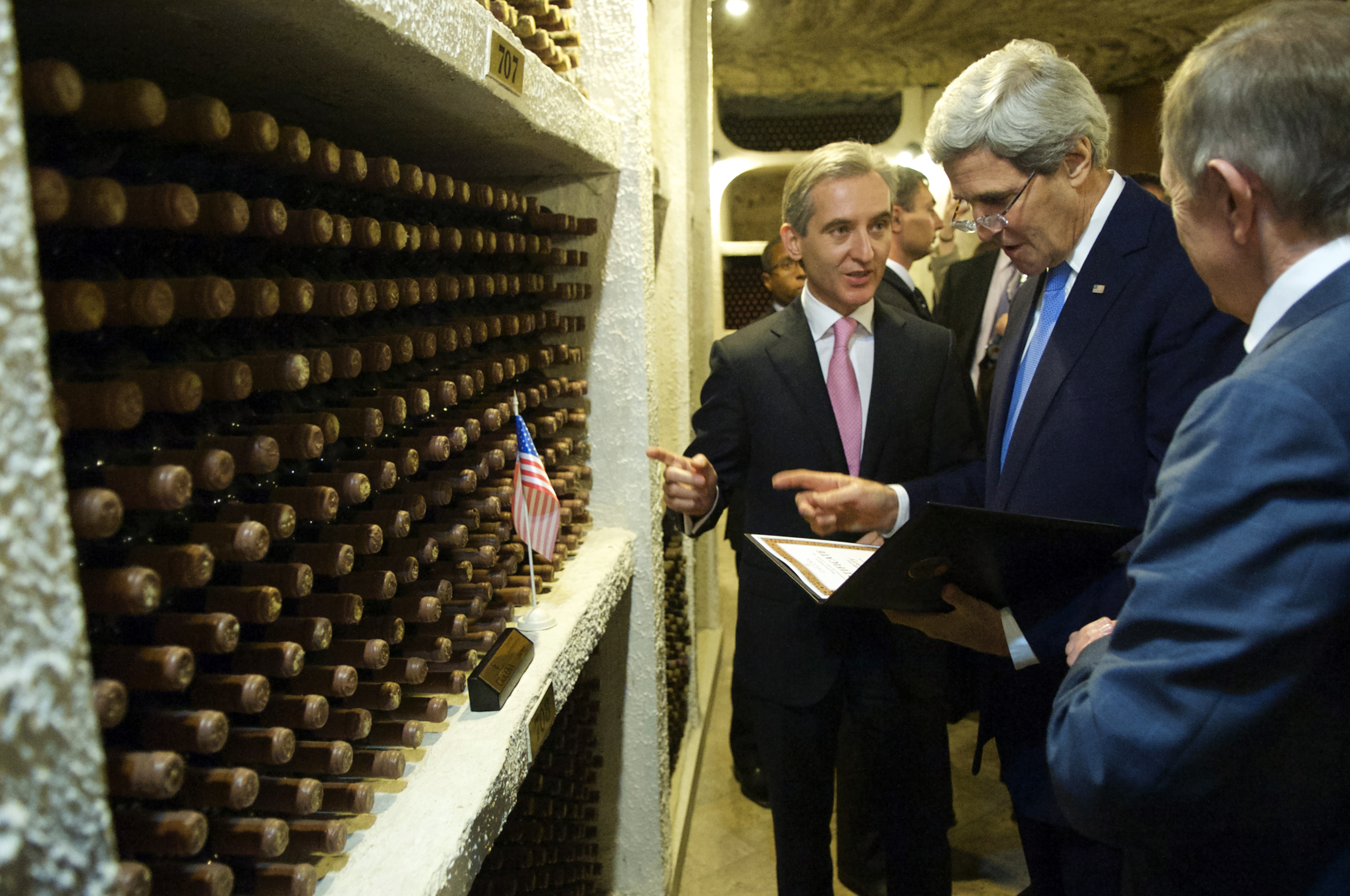
U.S. Secretary of State John Kerry visiting Cricova collection of wines

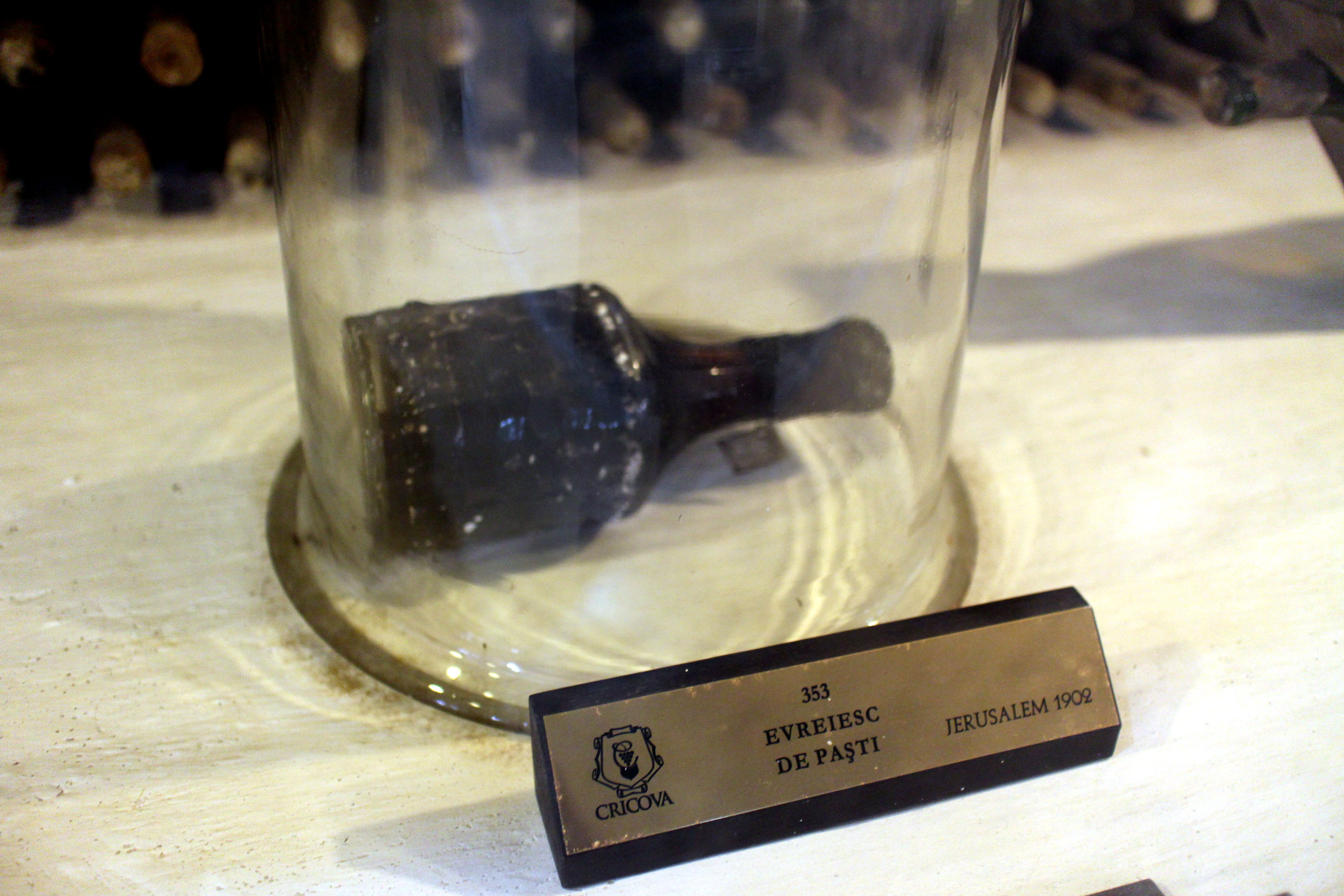
A bottle of wine (Easter Jerusalem, Ian Beher) circa 1902 is exhibited in Cricova Cellars.

Cricova is a Moldovan winery, located in the town with the same name, 15 kilometres (9.3 mi) north of Chişinău. Famous wine cellars make it a popular attraction for tourists.

== Winery ==
The wine cellars of Cricova are the second largest wine cellar in Moldova, after Milestii Mici (the largest in the world). It boasts 120 kilometres (75 mi) of labyrinthine roadways, versus MM's 200 kilometres (120 mi). Tunnels have existed under Cricova since the 15th century, when limestone was dug out to help build Chişinău. They were converted into an underground wine emporium in the 1950s.

Half of the roadways are used for wine storage. The roads are named by the wines they store. This "wine city" has its warehouses, tasting rooms, and other facilities underground. It goes down to 100 metres (330 ft) below ground and holds 1.25 million bottles of rare wine. The oldest wine dates back to 1902. The temperature is maintained at about 12 °C (54 °F) all year round (which is perfect for wine).

Legend has it that in 1966 cosmonaut Yuri Gagarin entered the cellars, re-emerging (with assistance) two days later. Russian president Vladimir Putin celebrated his 50th birthday here.

The territory used to be a mine for limestone, a building material. In some branches excavation is still active, so the cellar is still growing. Other famous wineries in Moldova include Cojuşna and Mileştii Mici.

The largest importer of Cricova wines is Kazakhstan. Previously Russia was the main importer, however this changed in 2014 when Russia imposed embargoes on Moldovan wine in retaliation for Moldova making moves towards joining the European Union.

== Wine production ==
Cricova produce sparkling wines in accordance with the classical French method, purportedly invented centuries ago by the monk Dom Pierre Perignon – "Methode Champenoise",

Cricova makes a unique sparkling red wine, kodrinskoie-sparkling, made from cabernet sauvignon stocks and marketed as having a 'rich velvet texture and a blackcurrant and cherry taste'.

The "Grand Cellars of Cricova" house a varied collection of wines, The National Oenotec. The unique exhibits ("Jerusalem of Easter" vintage 1902, the liqueur "Jan Becher" vintage 1902) together with other 158 brands from Burgundy, Moselle, Tokay, the Rhine, are in the collection of the establishment as well as of Moldova in general, comprising nowadays a total of about 1.3 million bottles. Among those are the trophies of the Second World War, which include wines from the collection of Hermann Göring. After the Soviets seized his private wine collection, a part of it was transferred to Crimea and the rest was brought to Cricova.

However, the pride of the Oenotec are, first of all, the wines bearing the name "Cricova", which brought the winery a collection of national and international tasting awards. As of 2008, the collection consists of over 70 silver, gold, and Grand Prix awards.
