= Codru (wine) =

Moldovan wine region

- Wine region
- Official name: Central zone
- Other names: Codru
- Country: Moldova
- Wine produced: Cabernet-Sauvignon, Merlot

Codru Wine Region is a Moldovan wine region. The Central or Codru Zone is the most industrially developed zone of Moldova. This is the site of the greater part of Moldovan vineyards (60%), and the majority of primary winemaking and bottling enterprises are also located here. The forests, hills and rolling countryside typical of this region protect the vineyards from winter frosts and dry summer winds. It is the best area for Feteasca, Sauvignon, Riesling, Traminer rose and Cabernet production. There is also a famous microclimate zone in this region - the Romanesti - the former wine-making Imperial colony of Romanov dynasty. This is the place to sample the best white and sparkling wines, as well as the so-called "divines" (fortified wines) and sherries.

In the Codru zone are also the most famous cellars of Moldovan wines – Cricova is the second largest underground wine cellar in the world, Milestii Mici is the world's largest wine cellar and is in the Guinness World Records for its 1.5 million bottles are believed to be the largest collection of quality wines in the world, and Brăneşti. These have the capacity for millions of decalitres of wine and spirits, and enjoy ideal conditions for the storage of wines and their aging – 12-14 degrees Celsius and 80% humidity. The cellars are located deep underground in the shell rock excavation, from which the city of Chişinău was built.
