= Nistru-Struguraș (winery) =

Nistru-Struguraș is a state owned Moldovan wine producer from Ungheni. It has been identified by the Moldovan government as one of the country's five strategic wineries. Plans were drawn up in 1999 for the privatisation of the winery but were rejected by parliament.

== See also ==
Moldovan wine producers
