= Acorex =

Moldovan wine producer

Acorex is a Moldovan wine producer from Cricova.

== History ==
The Acorex company started its activity in 1989 as an exporter of Moldovan wines. In the beginning the company was carrying out only trade operations by selling wines produced by various Moldovan wineries. The company then took the decision to build its own modern factory for wine production and bottling.

In August 1998, with an investment of 14 million US dollars, the construction of the first Moldovan private wine factory was accomplished. The company refused to cooperate with other Moldovan wine producers and completely focused on the production and selling of its own products.

Starting with 1999, the company started to build a program of individual production of grapes in order to control the quality of the products starting with the very first stages of its preparation.

== Current time ==
Acorex Wine Holding performs the processing of the grapes at three wine factories of primary processing in the south of Moldova in the villages of Corten, Tvardita, Valea Perjei, as well as at one of the wineries from the center of the country. The wineries are equipped with French and Italian equipment for the processing of the grapes (crushers, pumps, pneumatic press, filters, vertical and horizontal reactors with controlled fermentation temperature).

The grapes of Acorex Wine Holding come from the vineyards in the south of Moldova. The total area of these vineyards is 3000 hectares, and the harvest coming from it fully supplies the company with raw material. The company consults with experts in viticulture.

Foreign wine-making experts perform the quality control of the production processes at the facilities of the company, giving guidance to the Moldovan colleagues.

In 2003 the company received a certificate of production of organic wines from the Swiss company SGS. These are the wines of "Terra Verde" trade mark.

In the list of products are presented the following trade marks: "Acorex Wine", "Red & Wine", "Legenda", "Albastrele", "Corten" and "Terra Verde". These include 140 names of different categories.

The products of the company are exported to the United Kingdom, Belgium, Japan, Poland, Russia, United States, Canada, Germany, Denmark, Ireland, Czech Republic, Slovakia, the Netherlands, Sweden, Greece, China, Romania and many others.

The company has been awarded 110 awards that were conferred from 1999 at international wine tasting contests.

== See also ==
- Moldovan wine producers
