= Vodka Perfect =

Israeli vodka brand

- Type: Vodka
- Manufacturer: Vodka Perfect
- Origin: Israel
- Introduced: 1995
- Proof (US): 80
- Related products: List of vodkas

Vodka Perfect is an international brand of vodka, produced by Renaissance-Perfect, an Israeli-based company which operates three large manufacturing facilities in Israel and Romania.

The brand was first introduced in 1995 with the launch of the first production facility in Cricova settlement, Moldova. In 2000 the company moved its headquarters and center of operations to Or Akiva, Israel.

Vodka perfect is produced according to an old family recipe originating in Russia. Each of the three plants, produces the company's main products (classic, premium and flavored vodkas) as well as custom products for the local markets in which they operate. The Israeli product line is marketed as being fully Kosher, being produced by an all Jewish personnel. The marketing brochures state that the Israeli products contain water from the Jordan River in Israel (marketed as “Holy Land Water”), and are aimed for Jewish and non Jewish consumers who consider Kosher products to be of higher quality than non Kosher products.

Vodka Perfect has won several awards, such as the Romexpo Degustation Bucharest international trade fair contest 2003 and the International Spirit AWARD (ISW) 2004.
