= Cahul (wine) =

Coordinates: 45.904°N 28.199°E

- Wine region
- Official name: Southern zone
- Other names: Cahul
- Country: Moldova
- Grapes produced: Merlot, Cabernet Sauvignon, Băbească neagră

Cahul is a Moldovan wine region. The southern wine zone of Moldova includes the territories of the Bugeac Steppe and Moldova's south. These regions have similar drought affect, but differ in their soils and climate conditions. The conditions in the southern zone favor the production of red and sweet wines. The most famous wineries here are Comrat, Taraclia, Ciumai, and Trifești.
