= Nistreană (wine) =

Purcari
- Wine region
- Official name: Southeastern zone
- Other names: Nistreană
- Country: Moldova
- Location: south-east of Moldova
- Soil conditions: ?
- Total area: ?km2
- Size of planted vineyards: ?
- Grapes produced: Merlot, Cabernet Sauvignon, Rara Neagră
- Wine produced: Roșu de Purcari, Negru de Purcari.

The Purcari wine region (also called Nistreană) is a Moldovan wine region. The southeastern Purcari zone stretches along the Western Dniester coast. Here is the Purcari winemaking center is situated, made famous by its red wines: Roșu de Purcari and Negru de Purcari. The climatic conditions are favorable to the cultivation of red grape varieties: Chardonnay, Sauvignon blanc, Cabernet Sauvignon, Merlot, Pinot noir, Malbec, Rara Neagră and Saperavi, which serve as the basis for the production of aged wines.
