= Comrat Wine Region =

Comrat - also commonly spelled Komrat (Cyrillic script: Комрат (Komrat)) - lies within the southern wine region of Moldova, which specialises in red wine and muscat production.

== Location ==
Comrat lies in Gagauzia, more than 80 km away from its capital - Chişinău city. The town is spread out along the river Ialpug. The area around the town is rather hilly. The Moldavian-Ukrainian border is located in the East, less than 25 km away; the border with Romania is about 40 km to the West.

== See also ==
- Moldovan wine
