= Mileștii Mici (winery) =

Winery in Moldova

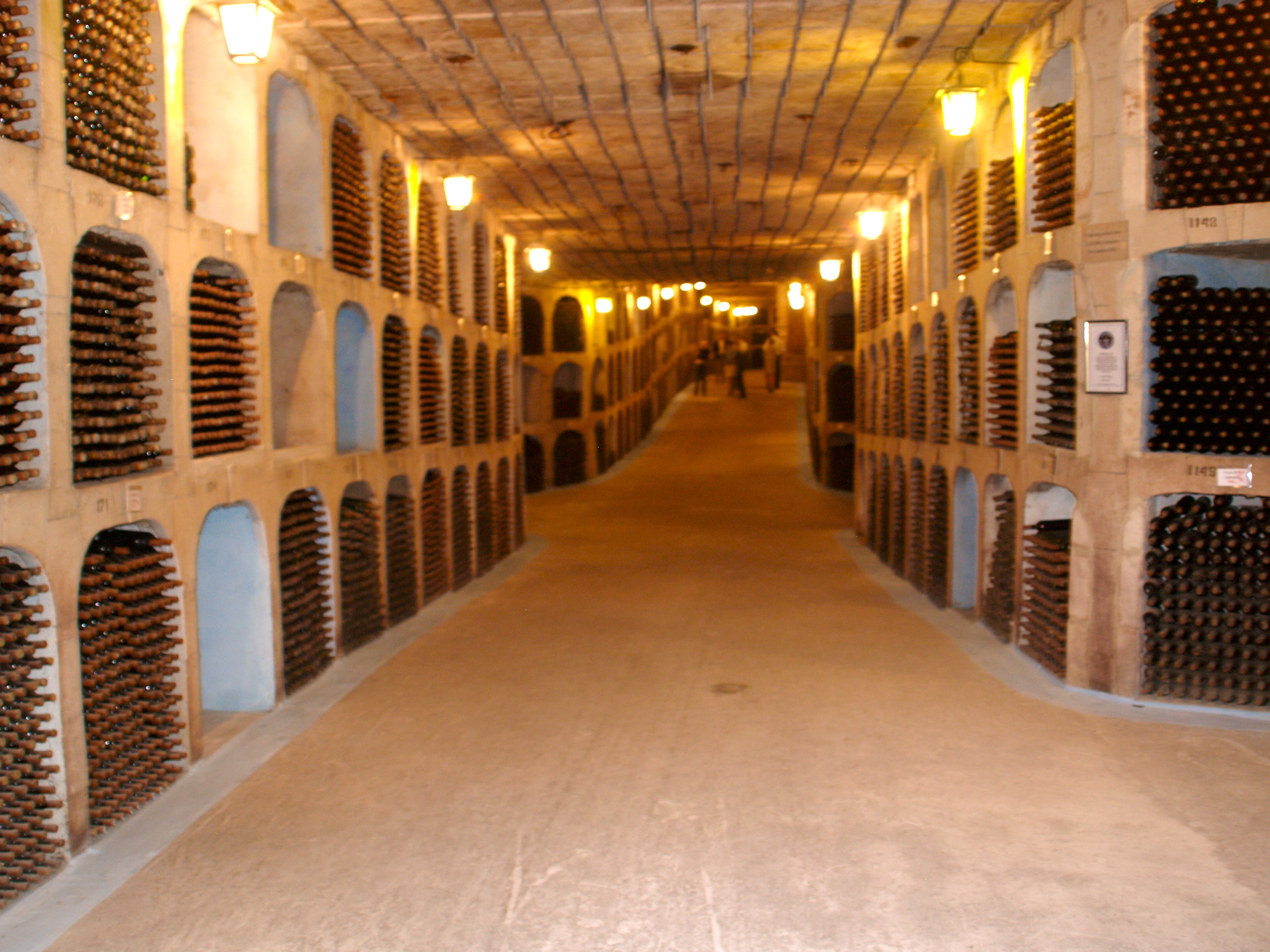
Mileștii Mici has the world's biggest wine cellars.

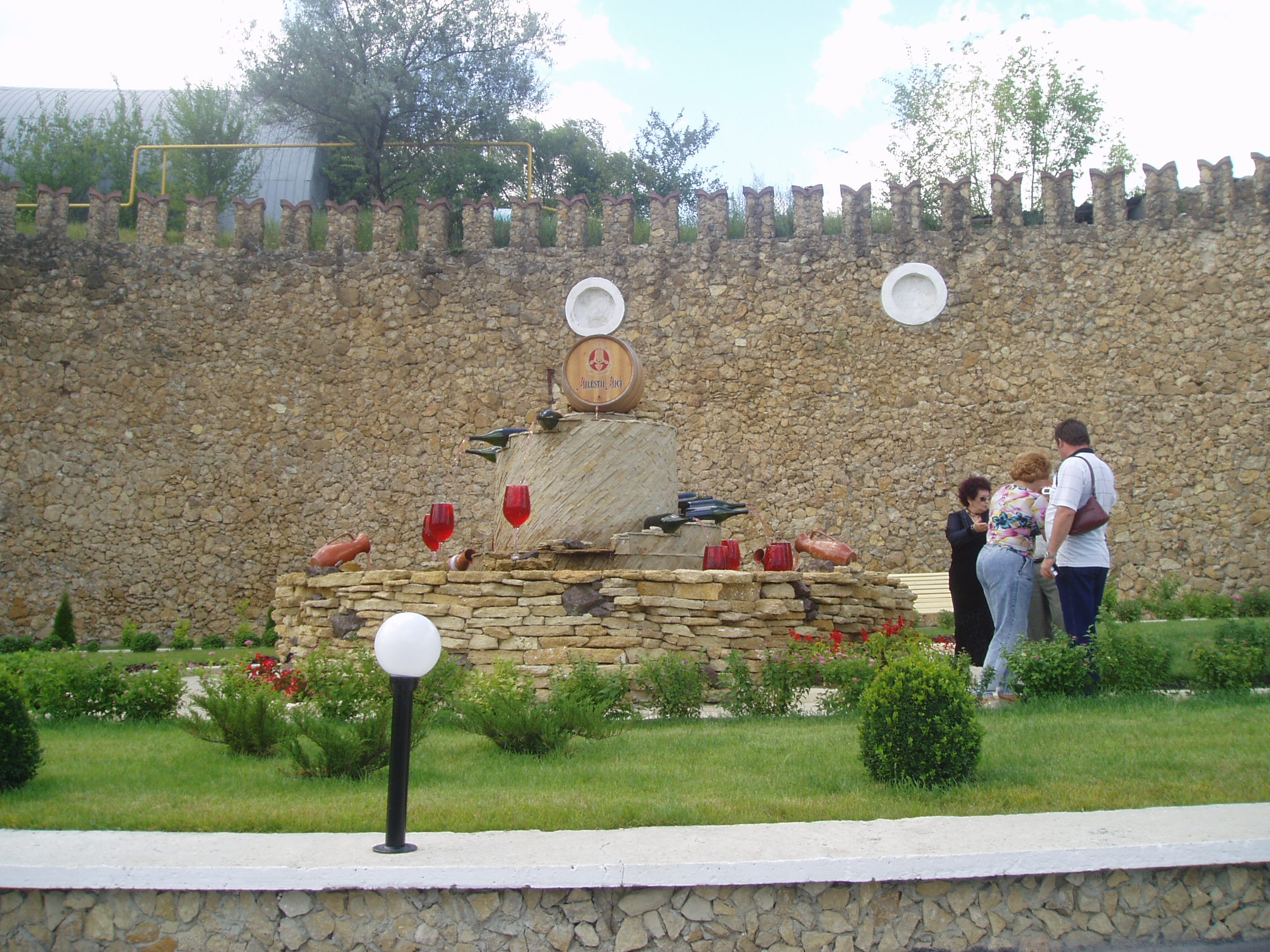
Wine fountain at Mileștii Mici

Mileștii Mici (pronunciation: [miˈleʃtij ˈmitʃʲ]) is a Moldovan wine producer located in the commune of Mileștii Mici.

== Cellars ==
The State Enterprise Quality Wines Industrial Complex "Mileștii Mici" was founded in 1969 to store, preserve and mature high-quality wines.

Local ancient underground galleries reach the Chişinău borders. The limestone in the galleries maintains constant humidity (85–95%) and temperature (12–14 °C [54–57 °F]) throughout the year. The longer some specific red wines are stored in such ideal conditions, the more they improve. Some wines are cellared for several decades before being sold. The cellars extend for 200 kilometres (120 mi), of which only 55 kilometres (34 mi) are currently in use.

In August 2005, Mileștii Mici was registered in the Guinness World Records as the largest wine collection in the world. Overall, the complex holds nearly 2 million bottles. More than 70% of the stored wines are red, 20% are white and about 10% are dessert wines. The most valuable items of this collection, worth €480 a bottle, were produced in 1973–74; they are now exported only to Japan.

Wines are exported from Mileștii Mici to Sweden, Japan, the USA, Great Britain, the Czech Republic, Poland, Greece, Germany, Denmark, Finland, and China.

== Wines ==
The wines stored here are made from crops of various years, beginning with 1969. Grapes include Pinot, Traminer, Muscat, Riesling, Dnestrovscoie, Milestscoie, Codru, Negru de Purcari, Trandafirul Moldovei, Auriu, and Cahor-Ciumai.
