= Plavaie =

Variety of grape

- Grape (Vitis)
- Color of berry skin: Blanc
- Species: Vitis vinifera
- Also called: Valan, Plakun, Bila Muka, Belyi Kruglyi, Melve (in Hungary), Plavets Gelber (in Austria), Plavana, Poama Plavaie (in Romania)
- Origin: Moldova
- Sex of flowers: Hermaphrodite
- VIVC number: 9553

Plavaie (Romanian pronunciation: [ˈplavaje]) is a Moldovan variety of white grape. This variety was popular in the 19th century and at the beginning of the 20th century. Now is rarely cultivated.

== See also ==
- Moldovan wine
