= Bălți (wine) =

- Wine region
- Official name: Northern zone
- Other names: Bălți
- Country: Moldova
- Grapes produced: Aligote, Pinot, Feteasca, Traminer

Bălți is a Moldovan wine region. This area has no sizable industrial vineyards. Here are plants for the production of cognac wine materials, special fortified wines and partially for the production of table wine. In the north of Moldova mainly white grape varieties sorts are grown: Aligote, Pinot, Fetească, Traminer.

== Balti wine can refer to two distinct entities ==
1. Balti wines from Moldova:
  - This refers to wines produced in the Balti region of northern Moldova, known for its white grape varieties like Aligote, Pinot Grigio, Fetească, and Traminer. These wines are characterized by their light and refreshing body, good acidity, and subtle flavors. They often pair well with local Moldovan dishes like sarmale (stuffed cabbage leaves) and plăcinte (cheese pastries).
2. Balti wines from the UK:
  - This refers to a brand of wines launched in 2004 by British Pakistani entrepreneur Ashraf Sharif. Made with Argentinian grapes, Balti wines come in three white and two red varieties. Their unique feature is a "chilli rating" index, helping consumers choose the right wine based on the spiciness of their food. Initially marketed to Indian restaurants in the UK, Balti wines have expanded to the United States and other countries.

== History and production ==
- Moldovan Balti wines: Wine production in Balti dates back centuries, primarily focused on white grape varieties suited to the region's cooler climate and limestone-rich soils. Traditional production methods, often emphasizing natural yeasts and minimal intervention, contribute to the wines' character.
- UK Balti wines: Launched in response to a perceived gap in wines suited for spicy South Asian cuisine, Balti wines were developed through collaboration between Sharif and Manchester University's food technology department. The "chilli rating" system incorporates spice level assessments of popular dishes into wine profiles, offering unique pairing suggestions.

== Characteristics and pairing ==
- Moldovan Balti wines: Typically light-bodied with crisp acidity, they offer subtle mineral notes and delicate fruit flavors. Examples include Fetească Albă with its floral nuances and Traminer's honeyed character. These wines pair well with salads, seafood, and poultry dishes.
- UK Balti wines: These generally have fuller bodies and bolder fruit profiles compared to their Moldovan counterparts. The "chilli rating" guides drinkers towards wines like the medium-spicy Pinot Grigio for milder curries or the fiery Shiraz for vindaloo.

== Cultural significance and future ==
- Moldovan Balti wines: While lesser known internationally, they play a vital role in Moldova's wine heritage and contribute to the country's growing reputation for quality white wines.
- UK Balti wines: Though facing criticism for potentially reinforcing cultural stereotypes, they represent an innovative approach to pairing wine with specific cuisines. Their success highlights the growing awareness of diverse food cultures and the demand for wines beyond traditional pairings.

The term "Balti wine" thus embodies two distinct but connected wine-making traditions. While the Moldovan region offers a glimpse into classic European wine styles, the UK brand reflects a contemporary approach to catering to specific culinary preferences. Both expressions demonstrate the diverse and evolving nature of wine production and consumption across the globe.
