= Romănești (winery) =

- Location: Moldova
- Wine region: Codru

Romănești (pronunciation: [roməˈneʃtʲ]) is one of Moldova's largest Moldovan wine producers from the north of Strășeni, part of the Codru Wine Region of Moldova. This winery originated as the winemaking estate of the noble Cristi family. One of its former owners, Grigory Cristi, was the governor of Moscow between 1902 and 1905. The winery has produced a notable Bordeaux-type red wine since 1960.

== See also ==
- Moldovan wine producers
