= Carahasani =

Carahasani Карагасаны (Russian) Карахасань (Ukrainian)
- Village
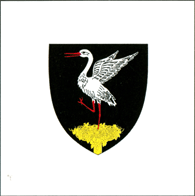
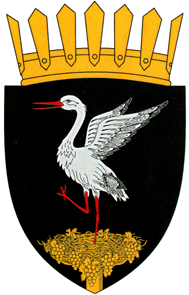
- Flag Coat of arms

- Location within Moldova
- Coordinates: 46°28′03″N 29°48′44″E
- Country: Moldova
- District: Ștefan Vodă

Government
  - Mayor: Vladislav Cociu (PDM)

Area
  - Total: 39.01 km^{2} (15.06 sq mi)
- Elevation: 136 m (446 ft)

Population (2014 census)
  - Total: 2,463
- Time zone: UTC+2 (EET)
  - Summer (DST): UTC+3 (EEST)
- Postal code: MD-4214

Carahasani is a village in Ștefan Vodă District, Moldova.
