= Aromaa =

Aromaa is a Finnish surname. Notable people with the surname include:

- Emanuel Aromaa (1873–1933), Finnish shoemaker and politician
- Vihtori Aromaa (1872–1932), Finnish bricklayer and politician
