= Purcari (winery) =

Moldovan wine brand

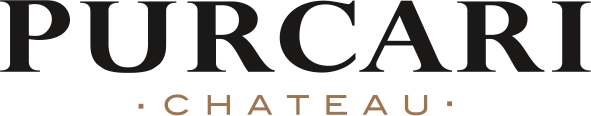
Logo of Purcari

Purcari (pronunciation: [purˈkarʲ], of the Purcari Wineries, LLC) is a brand of wine distributed in Central and Eastern Europe. The winery is located in Purcari Wine Region, within the Ștefan Vodă District of Moldova. Through the years, Purcari Winery has won over 250 medals at international contests like Decanter World Wine Awards, International Wine & Spirits Competition, International Wine Challenge and many other competitions.

As an exporter, Purcari Winery has entered over 30 markets in Europe, North America, and East Asia, in countries including the US, Canada, Great Britain, Norway, Czech Republic, China, Poland, Germany, Kazakhstan, Kyrgyzstan, Ukraine, Romania, Turkey, Japan, Luxembourg, and the Baltic countries.

.

== History ==
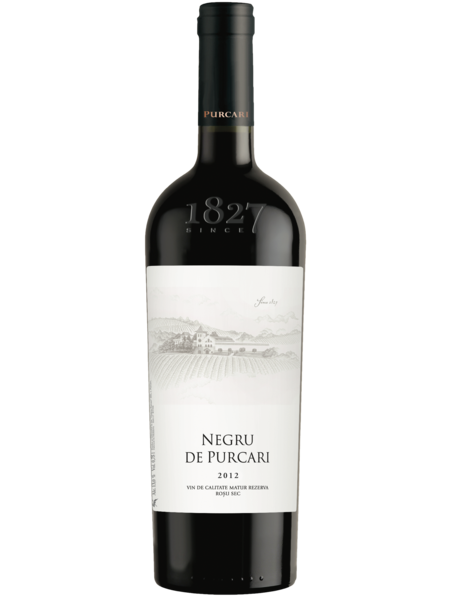
Negru de Purcari - Dry red wine. 70% Cabernet-Sauvignon, 25% Saperavi, 5% Rara Neagră. Aged for 18 months in French oak barrique.

In 1827, the Emperor of Russia, Nicholas I, issued a special decree granting Purcari the status of the first specialized winery in Bessarabia. It was named in honor of one of the founders originating from Germany – Harmizone. Since then, the owners of Purcari have become Moldovan boyars (barons) Dancila and Clot, but also other Germans, Russians, and French.

Two decades later, at the Agricultural Bessarabian Fair, Purcari received its first gold medal.

By 1878, the winery was being celebrated in a closed wine tasting at the Paris World Expo. French experts were impressed by the dry wine with an intense ruby color. They were sure that it was a new Bordeaux wine, but were surprised to later discover that the wine had originated in a small village on the banks of the Dniester River. Thus, the Negru de Purcari wine won its first gold medal at an international exhibition.

For a long time, Purcari wines were as popular as Bordeaux or Burgundy wines. The wine was served to Emperor Nicholas II as well as King George V and Queen Victoria of Great Britain.

A new chapter in Purcari's history began in the 1950 post-war era, when the Moldovan winemakers restored the classic production techniques of the famous wines. One of the greatest professionals of that time – Pimen Cupcea, reconstructed the legendary Negru de Purcari, while Ion Ungureanu created a new masterpiece – Purpuriu de Purcari.

Later, production ceased for 10 years when the Soviet Union collapsed as the winery was under the control of the Soviet government . In 2003, the winery was reestablished when Vinaria Purcari Company took over management. The Purcari production facility was fully revived and upgraded, and the old cellars were rebuilt and renovated using the model of the old ones, as they were in 1827. The original wine vault dating back to 1827 also has been restored and it is considered the oldest wine cellar of Moldova.

Sold in Denmark, Netherlands, Sweden, Germany, and France, Purcari wines are highly appreciated and continue to win international acclaim. Purcari wines have once again achieved wide popularity and become synonymous with the Republic of Moldova.

== Location, soil, and climate ==
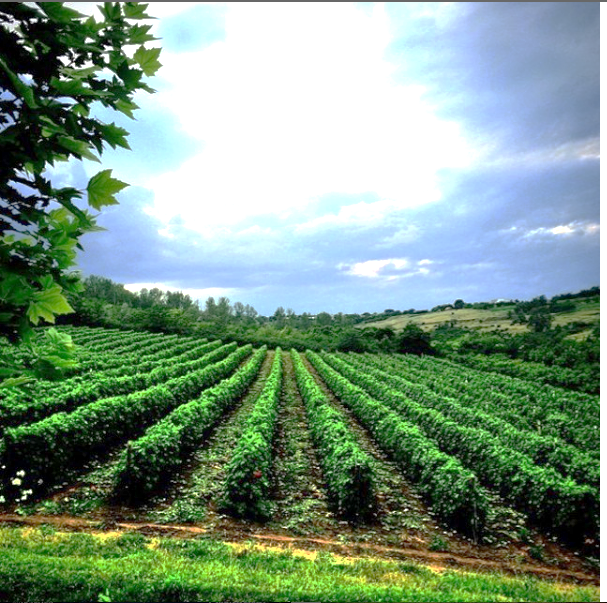
Purcari vineyards

Most of the Moldovan wineries and vineyards are located in the grape-growing areas of southern and central Moldova, at the same latitude as Bordeaux in France. Purcari is located in Ștefan Vodă district. The climate is moderate continental.

Purcari has its own micro-climate. The elevated Purcari region is 120 to 160 meters above sea level, with warm winds from the Black Sea, which is 60 km away. Fog may set in from over the Dniester River (situated 500 meters from the estate's vineyard), and the warm stream of air protects the vines in winter and favors the gentle ripening of the grape throughout summer. The well-drained sandy loam chernozem, rich in calcium has a relative humidity factor that varies from 0.68 to 0.75 and the amount of active temperatures is 3300˚ C. Combined with a perfect climate, the good soil is part of the favorable environment for grape cultivation.

Purcari Winery has cellars that were built at the end of the 19th century in the style of a manor house, where the temperature and humidity are constant. The Purcari Vinothèque houses the best wines. Oak barrels and bottles of wine are placed there for maturation, before being marketed.

Vineyards spread out along hills for over 260 hectares, and allow maximum exposure to sunlight throughout the day, helping the ripening of the grapes.

== Wine ==
Purcari grapes are hand-picked and processed using traditional methods. The wine-making process is based on the strictest canons of French viniculture.

Before fermentation, the grapes are cooled to obtain a high-quality wine, then the fermentation is repeated.

After obtaining the young wine, filtered and clarified at a low temperature, the creation of the famous vintage wines continues for Negru de Purcari, Rosu de Purcari, and Alb de Purcari.

The winery has maintained its secret "know-how" for years, since the very beginning.

Purcari Winery produces two million bottles of wine each year. The wine portfolio of Purcari Winery consists of 4 Vintage Wines, 6 Limited Collection Wines, 9 - 1827 Collection Wines, and 3 Sparkling Wines "Cuvée de Purcari".

Vintage Wines - Negru de Purcari Limited Edition, Negru de Purcari, Roșu de Purcari, and Alb de Purcari.

Limited Edition Wines - Purcari Ice Wine, Vinohora Rară Neagră and Malbec, Vinohora Fetească Albă and Chardonnay, Vinohora Fetească Neagră and Montepulciano, Maluri de Prut, and Freedom Blend.

1827 Collection Wines - Sauvignon Blanc de Purcari, Chardonnay de Purcari, Pinot Grigio de Purcari, Rosé de Purcari, Rară Neagră de Purcari, Cabernet Sauvignon de Purcari, Merlot de Purcari, Pinot Noir de Purcari, and Pastoral de Purcari.

Sparkling Wines - Cuvée de Purcari White Brut, Cuvée de Purcari White Extra Brut, and Cuvée de Purcari Rosé Brut.

== Chateau Purcari ==
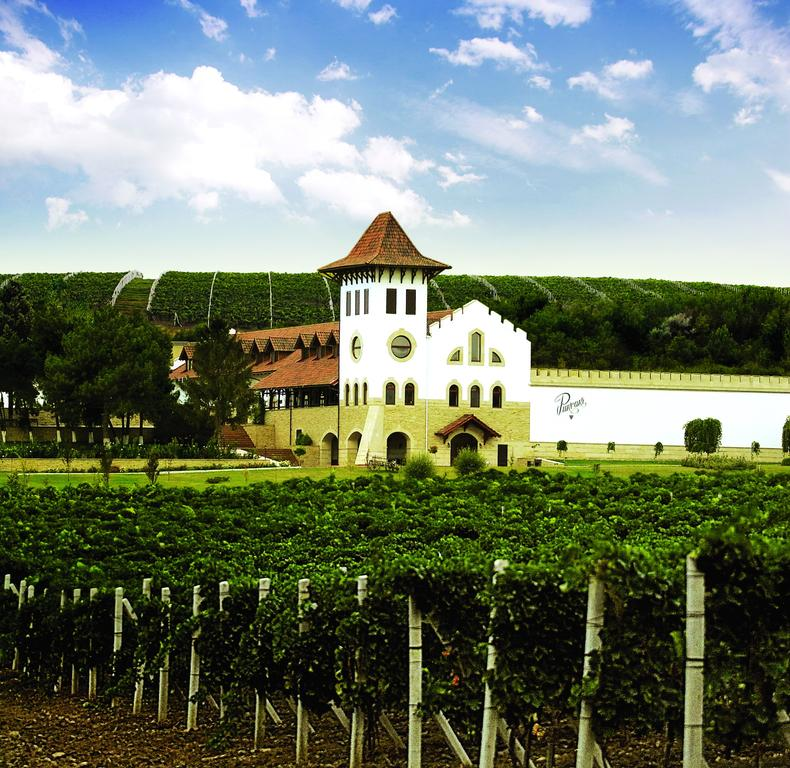
Purcari chateau

Chateau Purcari is the first "wine castle" built in Moldova in 2003. The Chateau is located in the same picturesque place as Purcari Winery, in the southeast part of Moldova, Ștefan-Vodă district.

The Chateau integrates the legendary Purcari cellars since 1827; The cellars store a part of the country's heritage – the famous collection of Vintage Purcari Wines. At the estate, built in the style of a French chateau, the visitors can find everything for a weekend escape, because Chateau Purcari integrates a cozy, rustic hotel, a restaurant, a terrace and offers activities like chateau and winery tours, wine-tasting, promenades in the vines with the bikes or by car, and hydro-bike rides on the lake among the swans. The place has a tennis territory and a safe playground for kids. Chateau Purcari is also known for the different kinds of events organized in its territory.

== Awards ==
Year	Event	Medal	Wine (vintage)
2016	Challenge International du Vin	Gold (Special prize)	Ice wine (2014)
2016	Challenge International du Vin	Gold	Alb de Purcari (2013)
2016	Challenge International du Vin	Bronze	Vinohora Rosie - Rara Neagra & Malbec (2014)
2016	Concours Mondial de Bruxelles	Silver	Negru de Purcari (2012)
2015	Challenge International du Vin	Bronze	Purcari Rose (2014)
2015	Concours Mondial de Bruxelles	Silver	Pinot Grigio de Purcari (2014)
2015	Concours Mondial de Bruxelles	Silver	Rose de Purcari (2014)
2015	Concours Mondial de Bruxelles	Gold	Sauvignon de Purcari (2014)
2015	Decanter	Silver	Purcari Rose (2014)
2015	Decanter	Bronze	Alb de Purcari (2012)
2015	Decanter	Bronze	Freedom Blend (2011)
2015	Decanter	Bronze	Negru de Purcari (2010)
2015	Decanter	Silver	Pinot Grigio (2014)
2015	Decanter	Bronze	Sauvignon de Purcari (2014)
2014	Challenge International du Vin	Bronze	Alb de Purcari (2012)
2014	Challenge International du Vin	Bronze	Chardonnay de Purcari (2012)
2014	Concours Mondial de Bruxelles	Silver	Rose de Purcari (2013)
2013	Challenge International du Vin	Gold	Alb de Purcari (2010)
2013	Challenge International du Vin	Silver	Ice wine (2011)
2013	Concours Mondial de Bruxelles	Silver	Alb de Purcari (2010)
2012	Challenge International du Vin	Silver	Alb de Purcari (2009)
2011	Challenge International du Vin	Gold	Alb de Purcari (2009)
2011	Challenge International du Vin	Silver	Negru de Purcari (2007)
2011	Challenge International du Vin	Bronze	Rosu de Purcari (2007)
2011	Concours Mondial de Bruxelles	Silver	Alb de Purcari White (2009)

== Purcari LLC ==
Purcari LLC was founded in 2003, being a part of Purcari Wineries PLC, a company that includes the wineries - Purcari, Bostavan, and Crama Ceptura (Romania), as well as Bardar, a brandy producer. Purcari LLC is a leader in the export of premium wines. Currently, Bostavan Wineries Group accounts for 30% of the wine market in Moldova and approximately 20% of the country's export market. The group's distribution network includes over 25 countries in Europe, North America, and East Asia. The company has a modern production capacity and over 1,000 hectares of vineyards in Romania and Moldova. The winemaking consultant is the Italian oenologist Giotto Federicco, who works in quality control, including soil analysis, and studies the organoleptic quality of wine.

In 2010, the American fund Horizon Capital and the World Bank became shareholders of the group.

== See also ==
- Negru de Purcari
- Moldovan wine producers
