= Negru de Purcari =

Negru de Purcari is a dry, red Moldovan wine, produced from Cabernet Sauvignon, Rara neagră and Saperavi grapes. The wine has a dark ruby, saturated color.

== Areas of production ==
The wine is produced in some Moldovan wineries, mainly in the Purcari area of the Stefan Voda district of Moldova (the Southeastern wine zone); it is locally called the "Queen of England’s wine", because Queen Elizabeth II regularly ordered the 1990 vintage. The Purcari winery produces its wine, which is matured for years in oak casks, in very limited batches. The wine is made from the French varieties of Cabernet Sauvignon, Georgian Saperavi, and Moldovan Rara neagră.

== See also ==
- Moldovan wine producers
