= List of rivers of Moldova =

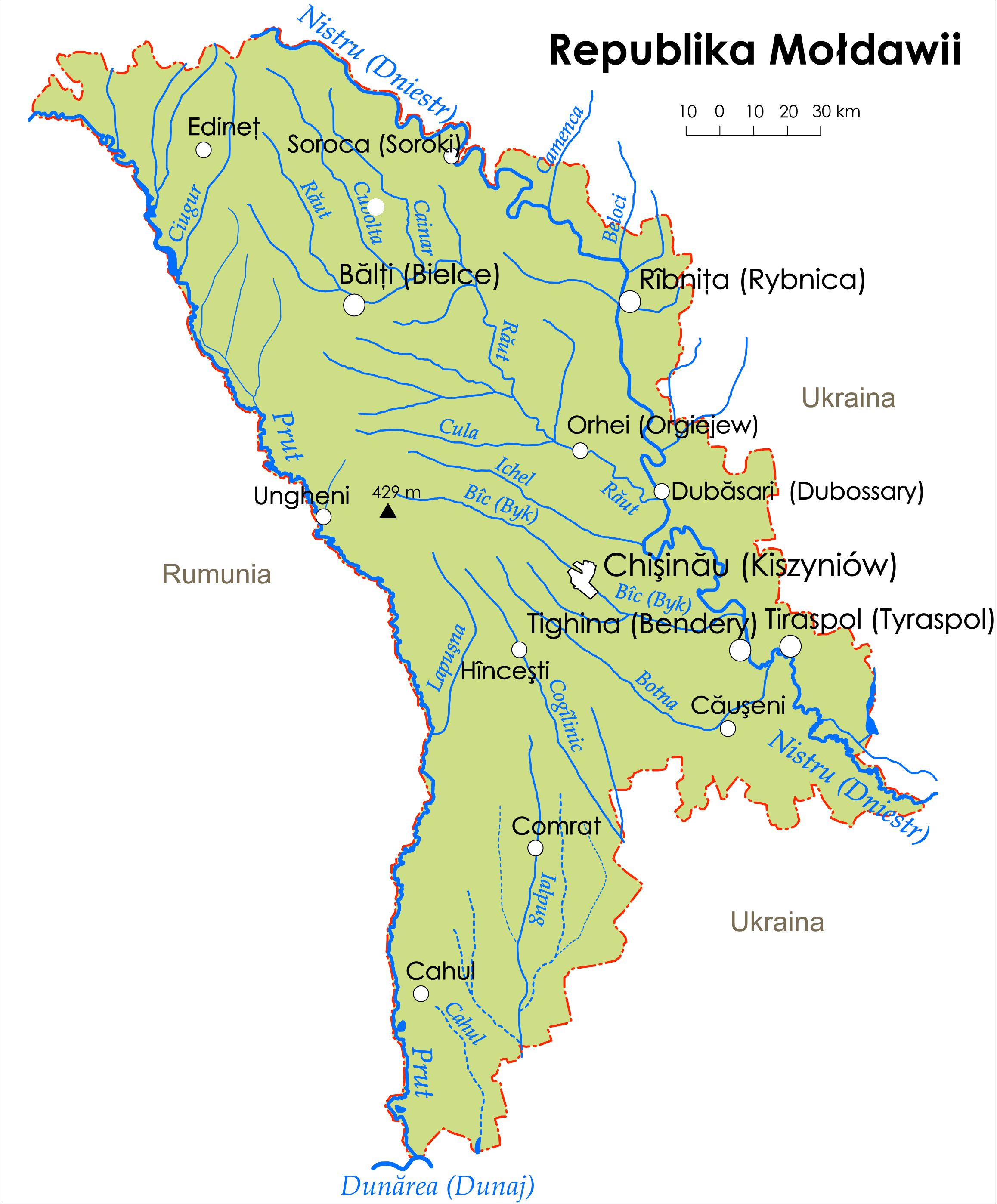
Map of Moldova with main rivers

The largest rivers of Moldova include:

River	Length (km)		draining in	Important cities
River	Total	In Moldova	draining in	Important cities
Dniester	1352	657	Black Sea	Soroca, Rîbnița, Tighina, Tiraspol
Prut	967	695	Danube	Ungheni
Răut	286	286	Nistru	Orhei
Cogâlnic	243	125	Black Sea	Hîncești
Bîc	155	155	Nistru	Chișinău
Botna	152	152	Nistru	Căușeni
Ialpug	142	135	Danube	Comrat
Ichel	101	101	Nistru	
Camenca	93	93	Prut	
