= Băbească neagră =

Variety of grape

Băbească Neagră
- Grape (Vitis)
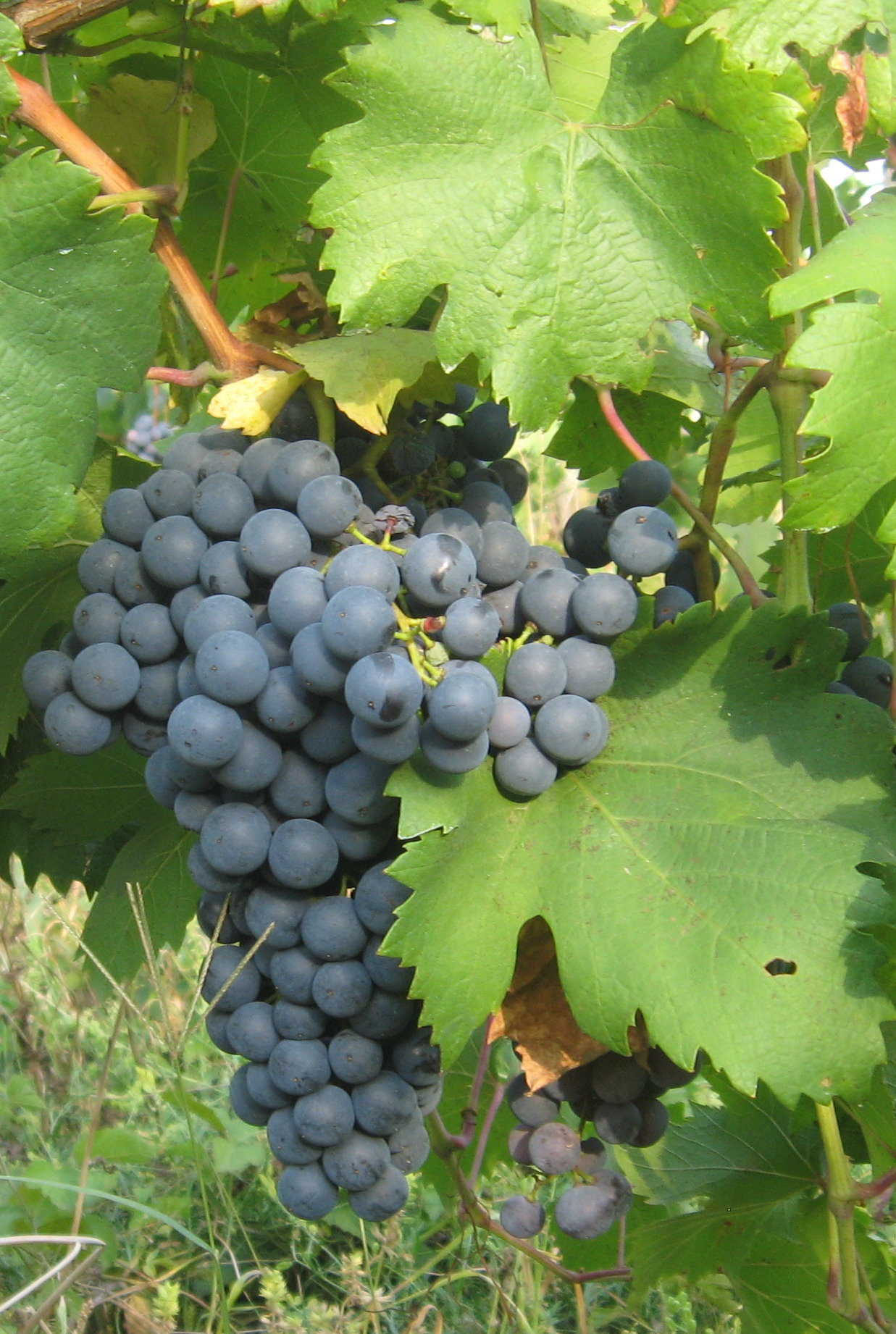
- Color of berry skin: Noir
- Species: Vitis vinifera
- Also called: See list of synonyms
- Origin: Romania
- VIVC number: 843

Băbească neagră (also Rară Neagră) is a red Romanian-Moldovan grape variety. It is cultivated in Moldova in the regions of Orhei, Anenii Noi, Straseni, Ialoveni and in Romania in the regions of Moldavia, Dobruja and Wallachia. In Romania, it is the second most planted grape variety. It is also found in Ukraine and New York, United States, where the grape is known as Sereksiya Charni.

The name Băbească neagră is derived from the Romanian words meaning "old lady's black". Most wines produced from Băbească Neagră are light-bodied, fruity red wines.

Being an old grape variety, Băbească neagră has demonstrated significant clonal variations including Copceac – a variation with bigger berries, Coada Rândunicii (Swallowtail) - a variation with a bisected bunch and Coada Vulpii (Foxtail) — a variation that has a cylindrical prolongation of the bunch. It has also produced over the years two color mutations including a pink-berried mutation which is called Băbească gri in Romania and Sereksiya rose in Finger Lakes, and a white-berried mutation known as Băbească albă.

== History ==
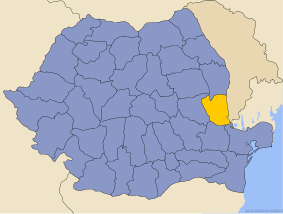
Galați County, where Băbească neagră is thought to have originated.

Ampelographers believe that Băbească neagră is a very old variety with the earliest mentioning of the grape dating back to the early 14th century. The name, in Romanian, translates to "Grandmother's black" and with the diverse and numerous clonal mutations (including the color mutations of Băbească Gri and Băbească albă) seems to lend support to Băbească neagră's longevity. While the grape is grown through Romania and Moldova, the region most often associated with the being the birthplace of Băbească neagră is the Nicorești region of Galați County in the eastern half of Romania that borders Moldova.

== Viticulture ==
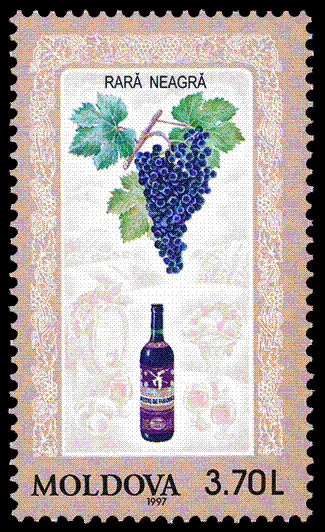
Rară Neagră on a Moldovan stamp

Băbească neagră is a late-ripening grape variety that is also a mid to late budding vine which contributes to the grape's winter hardiness and resistance to the viticultural hazards of early spring frost. During the cold Eastern European winters, Băbească neagră is able to withstand temperatures as low as −18 °C (0 °F). However, the very loose, medium-sized bunches of thin-skinned berries are very susceptible to the hazards of botrytis bunch rot, downy and powdery mildew as well as drought during the growing season. If yields are not kept in check by winter pruning and green harvesting, the vine can be very vigorous and prone to developing millerandage.

While Băbească neagră has many different clonal mutations, like Pinot noir and Grenache, it also has two notable color mutations—a white-berried Băbească albă, and a pink-berried Băbească gri which are grown around Huși in Vaslui County.

== Wine regions ==
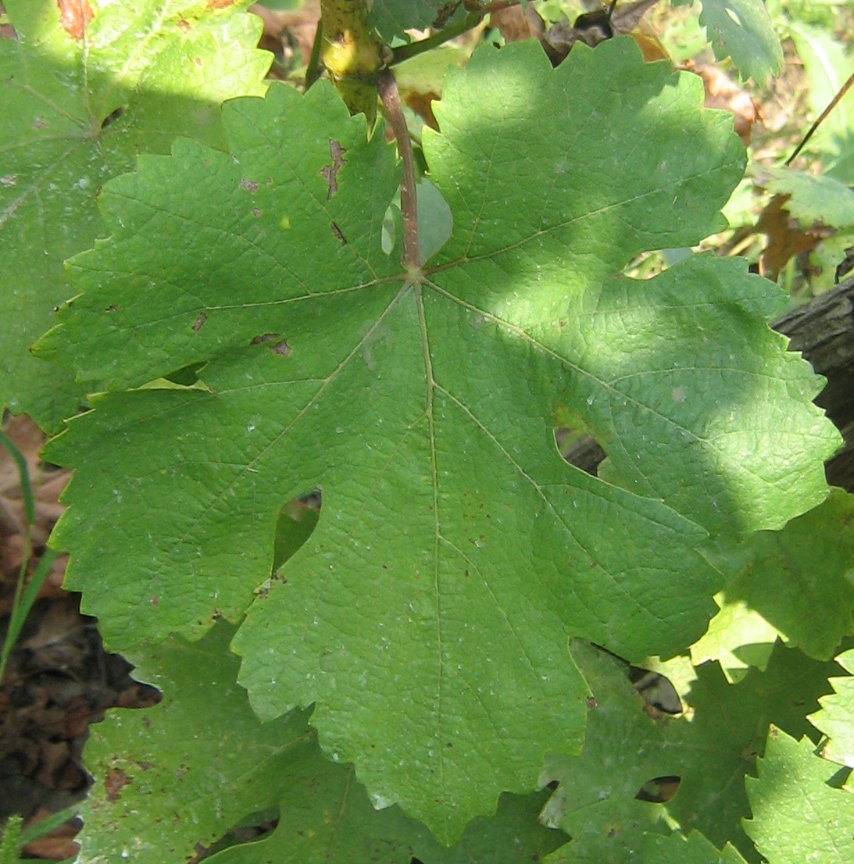

Most of the plantings of Băbească neagră are found in Romania where, in 2008, there were 4,516 hectares (11,160 acres) in cultivation. Most of these plantings are in Galați County, particularly around the communes of Nicorești. Significant plantings can also be found around Odobești in Vrancea County and in the sandy vineyard soils along the Danube river which forms Romania's southern border with Serbia and Bulgaria.

Outside of Romania, the grape can be found in Moldova, Ukraine and the United States. Băbească neagră can be found on limited acreages in the Finger Lakes region of New York State, where this variety was originally successfully cultivated by Konstantin Frank. Called Sereksiya Charni here (the Russian name), it is used by McGregor Vineyard to create an aromatic, fruity red wine (called "Black Russian"), blended with Saperavi.

=== Moldova ===
In Moldova, Băbească neagră (also called Rară neagră) is a late-ripening variety that gives red wines which are typically rich in acid and may exhibit a pronounced fruity character. It is responsible for the fame of the Purcari wines in the 18th century, before Cabernet Sauvignon was introduced to Moldova. This variety is used as a main blend component in the Purcari wine, Negru de Purcari.

== Styles ==
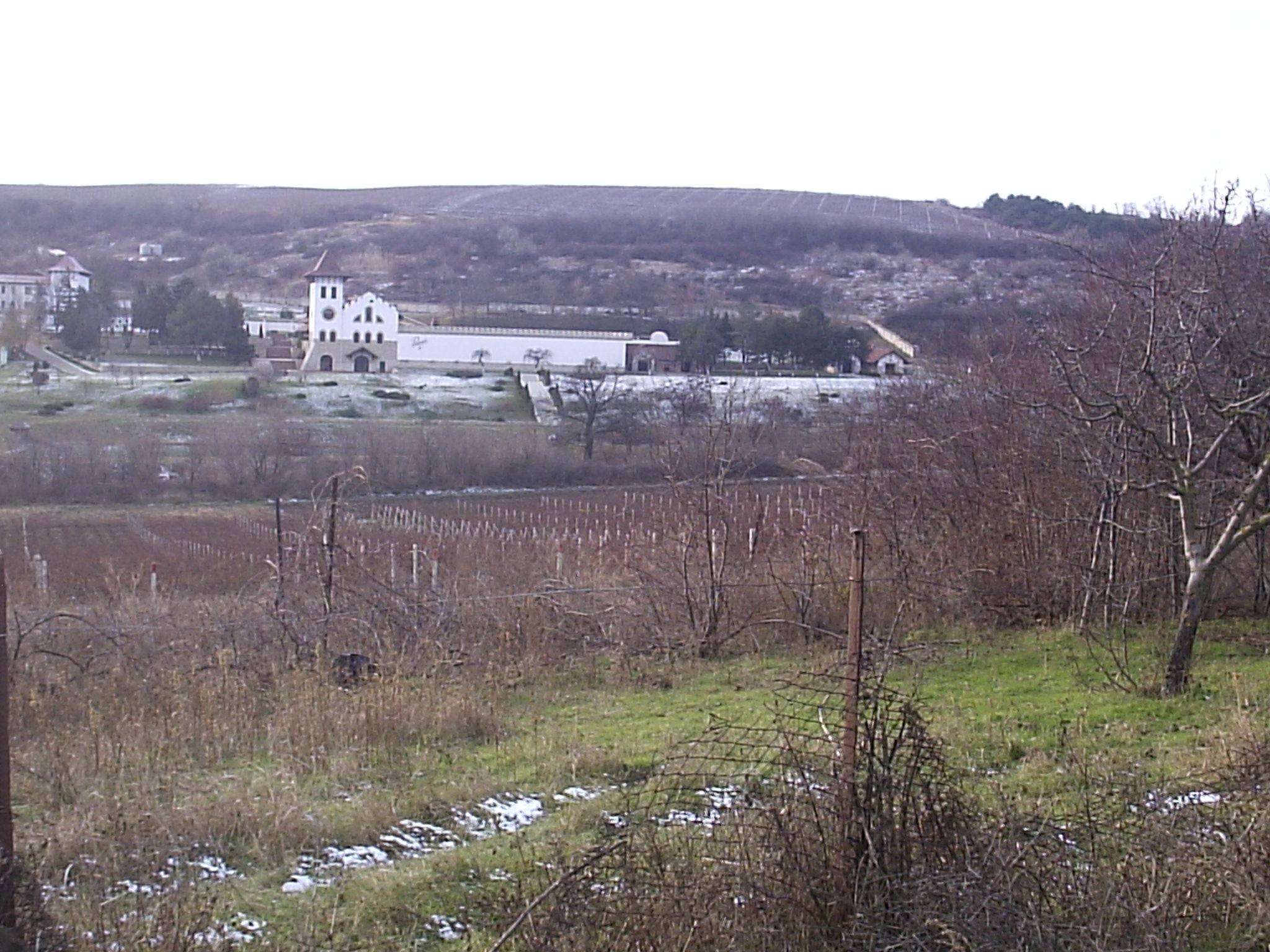
The Pucari region in Moldova where Băbească neagră is often blended with Cabernet Sauvignon.

According to Master of Wine Jancis Robinson, Băbească neagră tends to make pale, light-bodied, fruity red wines with notable acidity and a characteristic sour cherry note. The pink-berried color mutation Băbească gri tends to produce minerally white wines with lime notes that persist on the finish.

== Synonyms ==
Over the years Băbească neagră has been known under a variety of synonyms including: Aldarusa, Asil Kara, Asîl Kara (in the Republic of Dagestan), Băbească, Babeasca, Babiasca niagra, Babiaska niagra, Bobiaska niagra, Bobyaksa nigra, Bobyaska nyagra, Căldărușă, Caldarusa, Chernyi Redkii (in Ukraine), Chernyl Redkyl, Ciornai Redchii, Crăcană, Cracana, Crăcănată, Cracanata, Crecanate, Goldaroucha, Grossmuttertraube, Hexentraube, Kaouchanskii, Koldaroucha, Koldarusha, Koldursha, Koptchak, Koptchakk, Krekanat, Krekanate, Racanata, Rară Neagră, Rășchirată, Raschirata, Rastopirka, Rastopyrka, Rastrepa, Rastreppa, Rastriopa (in Moldova), Redkyi Chernyi, Rekhavo Grazdi, Rekhavo Grozdi, Rekhavo Grozdy, Richkirate, Richkiriata, Riedkym, Rimtsurate, Rimtzourate, Rindsourata, Rishki Rate, Rossmuffertraube, Rostopiska, Rostopoveska, Rychkirate, Rymourate, Rympurate, Ryshkirate, Saesser, Sassep, Sasser, Serecsia, Serecsia Ciornaia (in Moldova), Serectia, Sereksia (in Ukraine), Sereksia Chornaya, Sereksiya (in the United States), Sereksiya Chernaya, Sereksiya Tschiornaya, Serexia, Serexia noir, Serexia Tcheurnaia, Sesser, Stropaty, Stropatyi, Tchernyi Redkii, Tcheurny Redky, Timofeevka, Tsotler, and Tsotlyar.
