= Ștefan Vodă =

- City
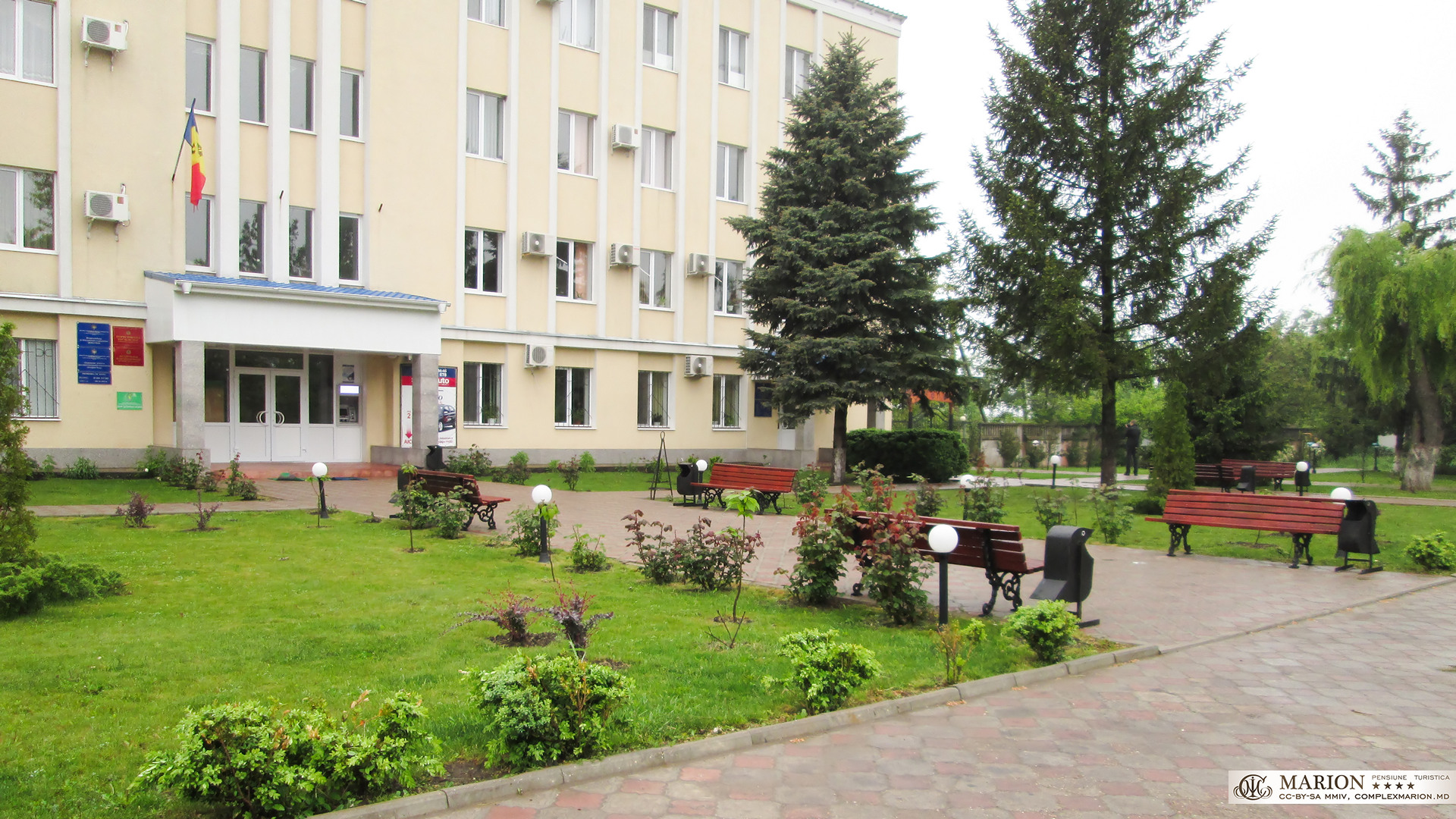

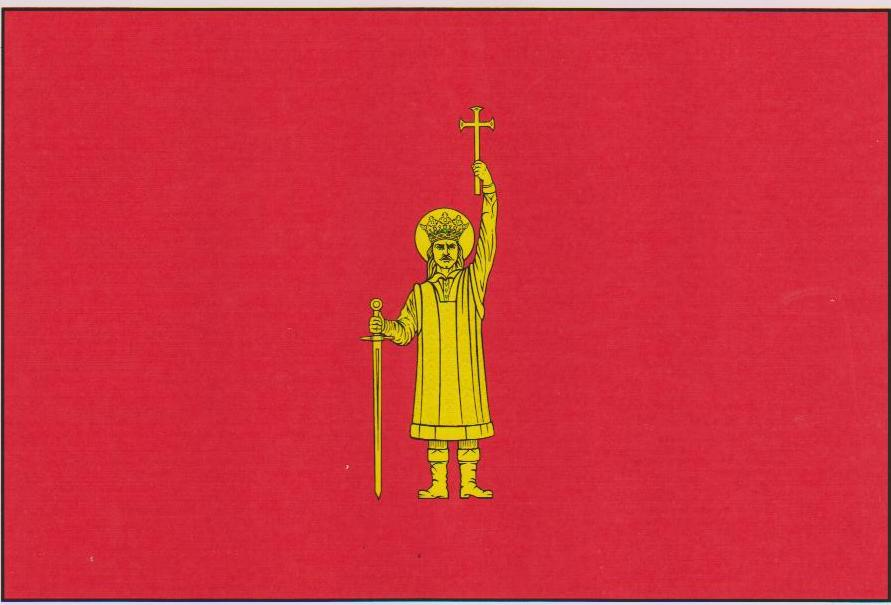
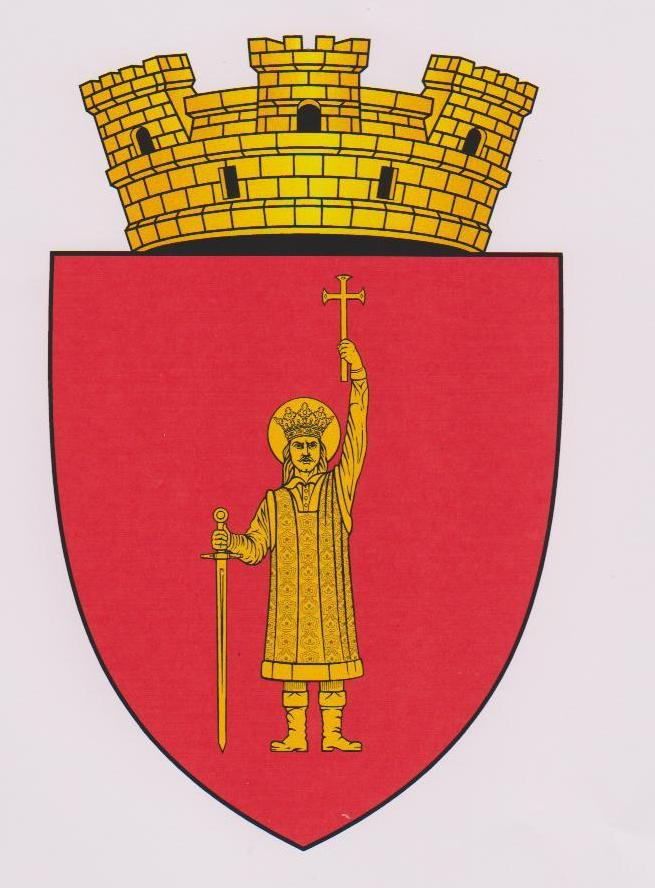
- Flag Coat of arms

- Location within Moldova
- Coordinates: 46°30′55″N 29°39′47″E
- Country: Moldova
- District: Ștefan Vodă District

Government
  - Mayor: Vladislav Cociu (LOC), since 2019
- Elevation: 162 m (531 ft)

Population (2014)
  - Total: 7,078
- Time zone: UTC+2 (EET)
  - Summer (DST): UTC+3 (EEST)
- Website: www.primariastefanvoda.md

Ștefan Vodă (Romanian pronunciation: [ˈʃtefan ˈvodə]) is a city and the administrative centre of Ștefan Vodă District, Moldova.

== History ==
Ștefan Vodă appeared on a map of the region for the first time in 1884, and was then resettled in 1909 as a small German colony. The town was formerly called Chizil/Kizil, then Suvorov in Soviet times (until 22 May 1990). The name Ștefan Vodă honours Stephen the Great.

== Climate ==
Climate data for Ștefan Vodă (1991–2020, extremes 1949–2021)
Month	Jan	Feb	Mar	Apr	May	Jun	Jul	Aug	Sep	Oct	Nov	Dec	Year
Record high °C (°F)	15.1 (59.2)	21.9 (71.4)	25.0 (77.0)	31.0 (87.8)	37.0 (98.6)	36.8 (98.2)	41.1 (106.0)	39.5 (103.1)	36.6 (97.9)	31.7 (89.1)	23.8 (74.8)	16.2 (61.2)	41.1 (106.0)
Mean daily maximum °C (°F)	0.9 (33.6)	3.3 (37.9)	9.0 (48.2)	16.4 (61.5)	22.5 (72.5)	26.4 (79.5)	28.8 (83.8)	28.7 (83.7)	22.6 (72.7)	15.6 (60.1)	8.2 (46.8)	2.6 (36.7)	15.4 (59.7)
Daily mean °C (°F)	−2.1 (28.2)	−0.6 (30.9)	4.0 (39.2)	10.4 (50.7)	16.2 (61.2)	20.3 (68.5)	22.6 (72.7)	22.3 (72.1)	16.7 (62.1)	10.5 (50.9)	4.6 (40.3)	−0.4 (31.3)	10.4 (50.7)
Mean daily minimum °C (°F)	−4.7 (23.5)	−3.6 (25.5)	0.1 (32.2)	5.5 (41.9)	10.8 (51.4)	15.0 (59.0)	17.1 (62.8)	16.7 (62.1)	11.9 (53.4)	6.6 (43.9)	1.7 (35.1)	−2.9 (26.8)	6.2 (43.2)
Record low °C (°F)	−25.3 (−13.5)	−24.6 (−12.3)	−16.3 (2.7)	−5.5 (22.1)	0.8 (33.4)	5.6 (42.1)	9.0 (48.2)	6.8 (44.2)	−1.5 (29.3)	−7.3 (18.9)	−15.5 (4.1)	−24.3 (−11.7)	−25.3 (−13.5)
Average precipitation mm (inches)	42 (1.7)	33 (1.3)	39 (1.5)	37 (1.5)	52 (2.0)	71 (2.8)	62 (2.4)	42 (1.7)	49 (1.9)	40 (1.6)	42 (1.7)	40 (1.6)	549 (21.6)
Average precipitation days (≥ 1.0 mm)	7	6	7	6	8	9	6	5	5	5	6	7	77
Average relative humidity (%)	86	84	80	71	67	67	65	64	69	76	85	88	75
Source 1: NCEI
Source 2: Serviciul Hidrometeorologic de Stat (extremes, relative humidity)

== Monuments and Landmarks ==
The town of Ștefan Vodă features several historical and cultural monuments:

- Monument to Stephen the Great (Ștefan cel Mare) (formerly Kizil / Suvorov).
- World War II Heroes Memorial — A commemorative complex dedicated to fallen soldiers of World War II (1941–1945).
- Transnistria War Memorial (1992).
- Afghan War Veterans Monument.
- Monument to the Romanian Border Guards of Regiment 5 (2) "Cetatea Albă". Bas-relief of Captain Aurelian Mihăilescu and the Bronze Crusader Eagle: Sculptor Veaceslav Jiglițchi and Master stonemason Serghei Rotari

== Demographics ==
According to the 2014 census, the population of Ștefan Vodă amounted to 7,078 inhabitants, a decrease compared to the previous census in 2004, when 7,768 inhabitants were registered. Of these, 3,269 were men and 3,809 were women.

Ethnic composition of Ștefan Vodă (2014)
1. Moldovans* (80.8%)
2. Romanians (7.00%)
3. Russians (5.40%)
4. Ukrainians (5.19%)
5. Others (1.50%)
:Linguistic composition of Ștefan Vodă (2014)
1. Moldovan* (61.3%)
2. Romanian (23.4%)
3. Russian (12.2%)
4. Ukrainian (2.37%)
5. Other (0.71%)

Footnotes:

* There is an ongoing controversy regarding the ethnic identification of Moldovans and Romanians.

* Moldovan language is one of the two local names for the Romanian language in Moldova. In 2013, the Constitutional Court of Moldova interpreted that Article 13 of the constitution is superseded by the Declaration of Independence, thus giving official status to the name Romanian.

Historical population
Year	Pop.	±%
1970	3,359	—
1979	6,724	+100.2%
1989	9,869	+46.8%
2004	7,768	−21.3%
2014	7,078	−8.9%

== See also ==
- Bessarabia Germans
- Vocea Basarabiei 103.8, a Romanian language radio station
