= Aroma (Caria) =

Roman inhabited town of ancient Caria

Coordinates: 37°54′44″N 28°08′18″E

Aroma (Ancient Greek: Ἄρομα) was a town of ancient Caria, inhabited during Roman times. In his Geographica, Strabo reports that the town was known for its wine.

Aroma was located in the hills above ancient Nysa, near present day Kavaklı, Sultanhisar in Asiatic Turkey.
