= Ștefan Vodă District =

Ștefan Vodă
- District
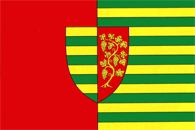
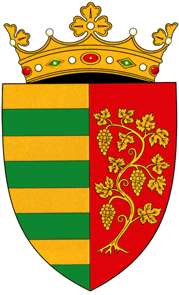
- Flag Coat of arms

- Coordinates: 46°30′N 29°40′E
- Country: Moldova
- Established: 2002
- Administrative center (Oraș-reședință): Ștefan Vodă

Government
  - Raion President: Olga Luchian (PAS, 2023)

Area
  - Total: 998.4 km^{2} (385.5 sq mi)

Population (2024)
  - Total: 42,285
  - Density: 42.35/km^{2} (109.7/sq mi)
- Time zone: UTC+2 (EET)
  - Summer (DST): UTC+3 (EEST)
- Area code: +373 42
- Car plates: SV
- Website: www.stefanvoda.md

Ștefan Vodă (Romanian pronunciation: [ˈʃtefan ˈvodə]) is a district (Romanian: raion) in the south-east of Moldova, with the administrative center at Ștefan Vodă. The district is situated 100 km from Chișinău and 100 km from Odesa, Ukraine. As of the 2024 Moldovan census, its population was 42,285.

== History ==
Localities with the earliest documentary attestation are: Cioburciu, Olănești, Carahasani, first certified locations in 1405-1456. In the 16th-18th centuries, intense agriculture was developed, with important wine-making industries and population growth attested. In 1812, after the Russo-Turkish War (1806-1812), Bessarabia was incorporated into the Russian Empire during this period (1812–1917), and an intense russification of the native population occurred. In 1918, after the collapse of the Russian Empire, Bessarabia united with Romania (1918–1940, 1941–1944), and the district was part of the Cetatea Albă County. In 1940, after Molotov–Ribbentrop Pact, Bessarabia was occupied by the Soviet Union. In 1991, as a result of the proclamation of Independence of Moldova, the district became part and residence of the Tighina County (1991–2003), and in 2003, it became an administrative unit of Moldova.

== Geography ==
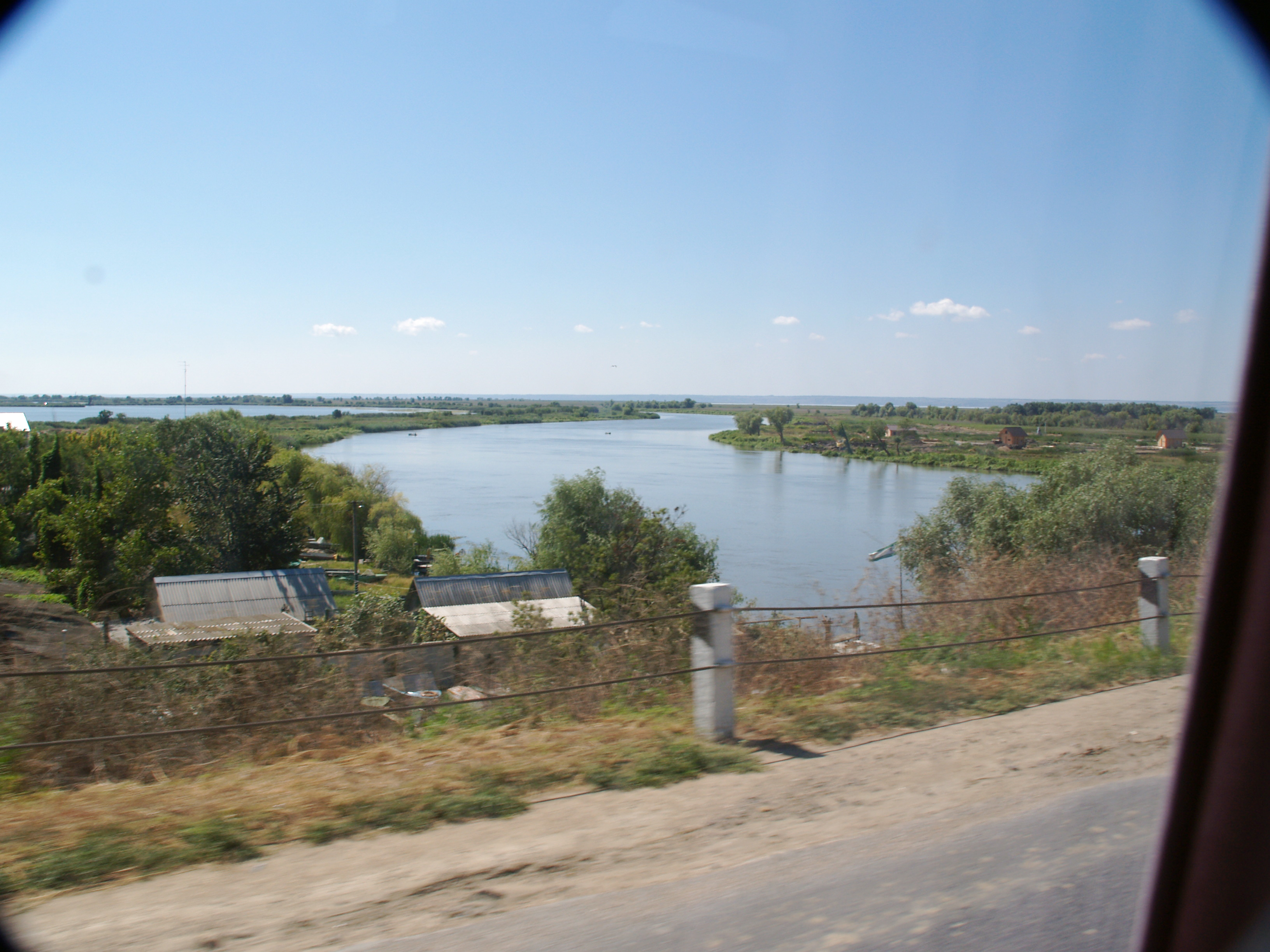
Palanca and Nistru river

Ștefan Vodă district is located in south-eastern part of the Republic of Moldova. It is bordered by Căușeni District in the northwest, Slobozia District in the northeast, and the state border with Ukraine in the south and east. The landscape is predominantly plain, slightly fractured, the highest altitude around 210–230 m in the western part of district. Minimum altitude 2–5 m in the Lower Nistru Plain. Erosion processes with a low intensity.

=== Climate ===
Temperate continental climate with an annual average district temperature 11 °C (52 °F). July average temperature 22.5 °C (73 °F), of January −4 °C (25 °F). Annual precipitation 450–550 mm. Average wind speed 3–5 m \ s.

=== Fauna ===
Typical European fauna, with the presence of such mammals such as foxes, hedgehogs, deer, wild boar, polecat, wild cat, ermine and others. Of birds: partridges, crows, eagles, starling, swallow and more.

=== Flora ===
Forests of the district are complemented by tree species such as oak, ash, hornbeam, linden, maple, walnut and others. From plants: wormwood, knotweed, fescue, nettle and many others.

=== Rivers ===
Ștefan Vodă district is located in the basin of the Nistru River, which crosses the district in the north-eastern part of district. Tributaries of the Nistru here are usually short. The area has numerous artificial lakes.

== Administrative subdivisions ==
- Localities: 26
  - Administrative center: Ștefan Vodă
    - Cities: Ștefan Vodă
      - Villages: 3
        - Communes: 22

== Demographics ==
In the 2024 Census, the district population was 42,285 of which 12.9% urban and 87.1% rural population.

=== Ethnic groups ===
Ethnic group	% of total
Moldovans *	86.7
Romanians *	8.4
Ukrainians	2.4
Russians	1.5
Romani	0.5
Bulgarians	0.1
Gagauz	0.1
Other	0.2
Undeclared	0.1

Footnote: * There is an ongoing controversy regarding the ethnic identification of Moldovans and Romanians.

=== Religion ===
- Christians - 99.0%
  - Orthodox Christians - 94.3%
  - Protestant - 4.6%
- Other - 0.1%
- No religion - 0.5%
- Not Declared - 0.5%

== Economy ==
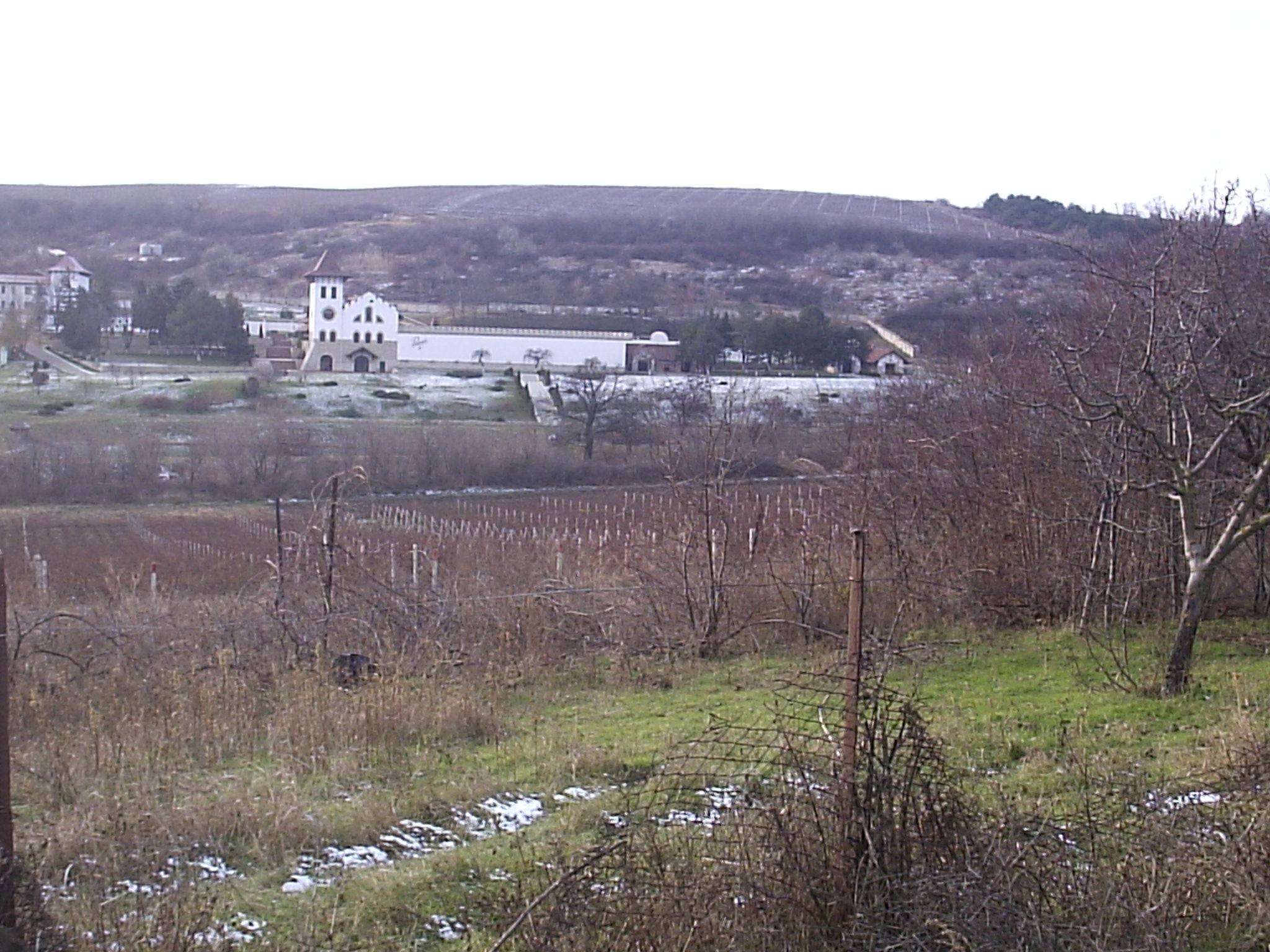
Purcari wine factory

Ștefan Vodă District hosts a total of 14,469 registered businesses, many of which are agricultural. Agricultural land makes up 65,199 ha (65.3%) of total land area, while arable land occupies 55,542 ha (55.6%) of the total agricultural land. The farmland in the district includes 4977 ha (5.0%) of vines, 3237 ha (3.2%) of orchards, and 1398 ha (1.4%) of pastures. Major crops grown in the area include wheat, oats, sunflower, canola, soybeans, and vegetables.

== Education ==
Stefan Voda district are 63 educational institutions, including 31 kindergartens, 30 primary and secondary education, a vocational school. In schools with training and education are included in total 13,673 students, including 2,839 children in kindergartens in schools, 10,284 university students, 354 students in vocational schools, 196 vocational school students. Nowadays in education, the 1264 district teachers operate.

== Politics ==
Stefan Voda district granted priority mainly right-wing parties. In Moldova represented by the AEI. PCRM is a continuous fall in percentage the last three elections.

During the last three elections AEI had an increase of 107.6%

Parliament elections results
Year	AEI	PCRM
2010	60.36% 18,311	32.96% 9,998
July 2009	52.73% 15,925	36.52% 11,029
April 2009	29.46% 8,820	46.92% 14,050

=== Elections ===
Summary of 28 November 2010 Parliament of Moldova election results in Stefan Voda District
Parties and coalitions	Votes	%	+/−
Liberal Democratic Party of Moldova	11,759	38.76	+17.07
Party of Communists of the Republic of Moldova	9,998	32.96	−3.56
Democratic Party of Moldova	3,497	11.53	+2.84
Liberal Party	2,263	7.46	−6.85
Party Alliance Our Moldova	792	2.61	−5.43
United Moldova	391	1.29	+1.29
Humanist Party of Moldova	324	1.07	+1.07
Other Party	1,323	4.32	-6.43
Total (turnout 56.29%)	30,628	100.00	

== Culture ==
In district active: 26 culture houses, 2 museums, 86 artistic bands including 26 bands holding the title of the band model, 37 public libraries.

== Education ==
In Stefan Voda district works: a hospital with 220 beds general fund, a center of family doctor's in the composition of which included: 13 health center's, nine family doctors office. The population of the district health care operates 110 medical personnel 354 average, 260 nurses and auxiliary health personnel.
