= Purcari =

- Commune
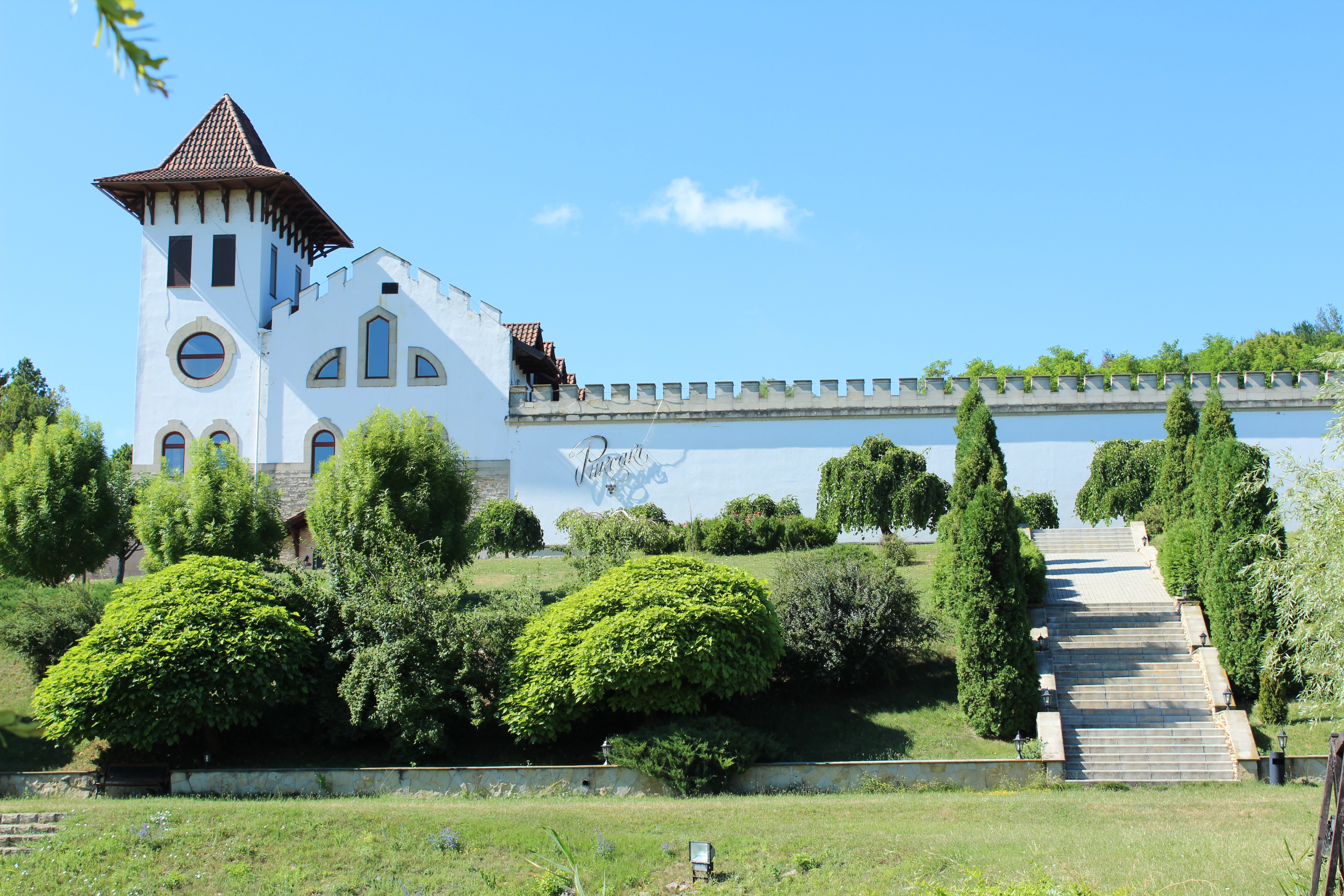
- Château Purcari, Purcari, Moldova
- Interactive map of Purcari
- Location within Moldova
- Coordinates: 46°32′20″N 29°51′24″E
- Country: Moldova
- District: Ștefan Vodă District

Government
  - Mayor: Boiștean Serghei (PLDM)

Area
  - Total: 4,263 km^{2} (1,646 sq mi)
- Elevation: 113 m (371 ft)

Population (2014)
  - Total: 2,368
- Time zone: UTC+2 (EET)
  - Summer (DST): UTC+3 (EEST)
- Postal code: MD-4229

Purcari is a commune in the Ștefan Vodă District of Moldova. It is composed of two villages, Purcari and Viișoara.

== See also ==
- Purcari wine region
- Purcari (winery)

== Notable people ==
- Boris Volosatîi (born 1956), professor and member of the Parliament of Romania
