= Aroma (winery) =

Moldovan wine producer

Aroma is a Moldovan wine producer from Chişinău.

== Winery ==
The Joint Stock Company AROMA, one of the largest wineries in the Republic of Moldova, celebrated in 1998 the first centenary of its history. It is situated in the center of the capital of the Republic, Chişinău. During the years, the winery has been known by different names. The present name appeared in 1983, when the Association of production "AROMA" was created. In January 2000, the winery received the statute of the Joint Stock Company "AROMA".

Reception and distillation of wine materials for divin (cognac), production and bottling of divin and wine are made in the name of the company.

== History ==
The enterprise dates from 1898 and is among the oldest producers of divin in Moldova.

In 1995 a government decision set up a Moldovan–Cypriot joint venture named Aroma-Plus together with the Cypriot company G.M.V. Co Ltd. The state-owned enterprise contributed its bottling facility on Bucuriei street in Chișinău, valued at 1,577,714 lei (six per cent of its fixed assets), and received 32 per cent of the shares, while the Cypriot partner held the remaining 68 per cent. A 1998 report by the Court of Accounts found that the building of the bottling facility had been undervalued, which accounted for the small size of the state's holding.

Under investment terms revised in 1996, the Cypriot founder handed over only a small part of the equipment it had promised, kept the rest and leased it to the joint venture. In 1997 and 1998, in an attempt to recover the bottling facility, the enterprise sold its production site on Petricani street, about 6,000 square metres of buildings with a transformer station and a railway siding, for one million lei. The return of the bottling facility was not written into the sale contract and the enterprise lost both properties. According to the Court of Accounts, the Petricani site was sold well below its market value. The joint venture was renamed Euro-Alco in 1997, and in 2010 the state transferred its 32 per cent holding to a private shareholder.

On 30 July 2024 the government approved the absorption of the company by Barza Albă, a distillery in Bălți. Both companies are state-owned through the Public Property Agency, their sole shareholder, which was charged with carrying out the reorganisation. Barza Albă undertook to settle debts of about 35 million lei that had been outstanding for eleven years, to invest in infrastructure and to rebrand several of the absorbed company's products, among them the divins Chișinău, Moldova, Basarabia and Dacia.

On 16 August 2024 Barza Albă transferred 28.93 million lei to a special account held by the insolvency administrator in order to pay the creditors, using a ten-year loan from Victoriabank. The state waived dividends of about 2.2 million lei from the 2023 profit and about 2.8 million lei from the 2024 profit of Barza Albă, some 4.95 million lei in total, classified as de minimis aid. The Public Property Agency expected the recovery of validated claims to bring about 19 million lei to the state budget.

In June 2025 the agency appointed Andrei Luța, formerly deputy director of Barza Albă, as interim head of the company. An audit report recorded that the reorganisation had not begun as of 22 April 2026, while the agency planned to complete the takeover during that year. On completion Barza Albă takes over all rights and obligations of the absorbed company, whose trademarks and product ranges are to be kept.
