= Aromas =

Aromas may refer to:

- Odors, particularly pleasant ones, or
- Aromas, California, or
- Aromas, Jura, one of the 545 communes of the Jura département, in France
- Aromas Coffee, an Australian coffee house
