= Aroma Housewares =

Cookware and kitchen appliance company

Aroma Housewares Company
- Type: Private
- Industry: Cookware
- Founded: 1977
- Headquarters: 6469 Flanders Dr, San Diego, California, United States
- Area served: United States
- Key people: Peter Chang (founder)
- Website: www.aromaco.com

Aroma Housewares Company also known as Mirama Enterprises, Inc, branded as Aroma, is a cookware and small kitchen appliance manufacturing company founded by Peter Chang in Southern California in 1977. The company is a leading American brand for rice cookers. It also produces portable electric burners, hot pots, induction products, electric woks, food steamers, countertop ovens, food dehydrators, pressure cookers, coffee makers, rice dispensers, slow cookers, DoveWare cookware and bakeware, and toasters.

== History ==
In 1977, Peter Chang founded Aroma Housewares in Southern California focusing on ovens. By 1981, Chang had expanded to nine locations across San Diego and Los Angeles counties. Aroma introduced their first electric product in 1988, the Aeromatic Turbo Oven. Aroma added rice cookers in 1992 which became their most popular product. Aroma also offered a portable butane burner.

In 1996, Aroma moved its headquarters to San Diego and renamed the corporation to Mirama Enterprises, Inc, though the company still sells products under its brand name Aroma.

In 2004, the CPSC upheld a lawsuit against Aroma after it failed to report 23 complaints against a particular model of juicer which exploded during use, ejecting debris and sharp metals. The company was required to report the issue to the CPSC within 24 hours. Aroma was ordered to pay damages after failing to report the issue by the deadline.
