= Moldovan wine =

Wine making in Moldova

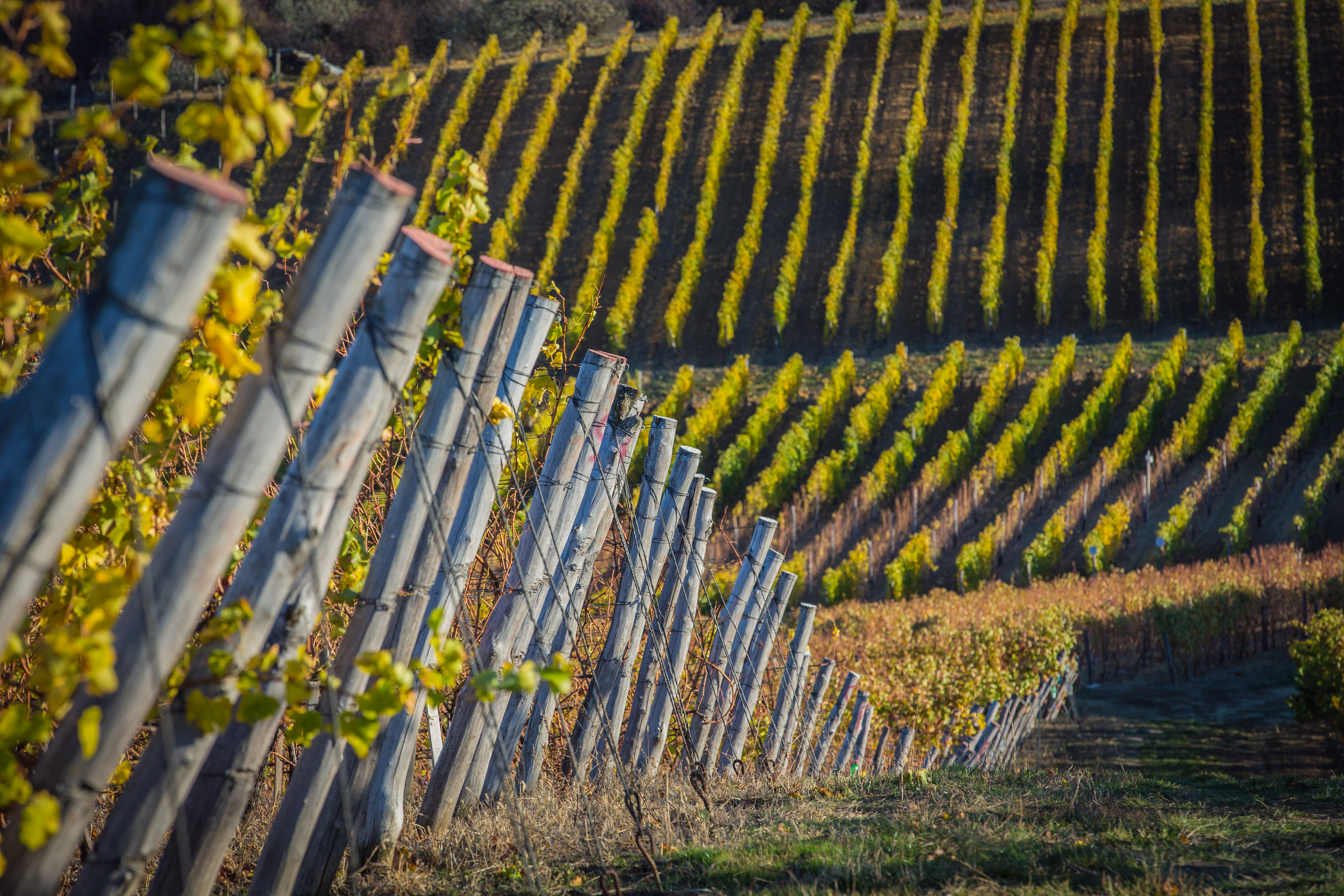
Moldova has geological and climatic conditions which are favorable for viticulture.

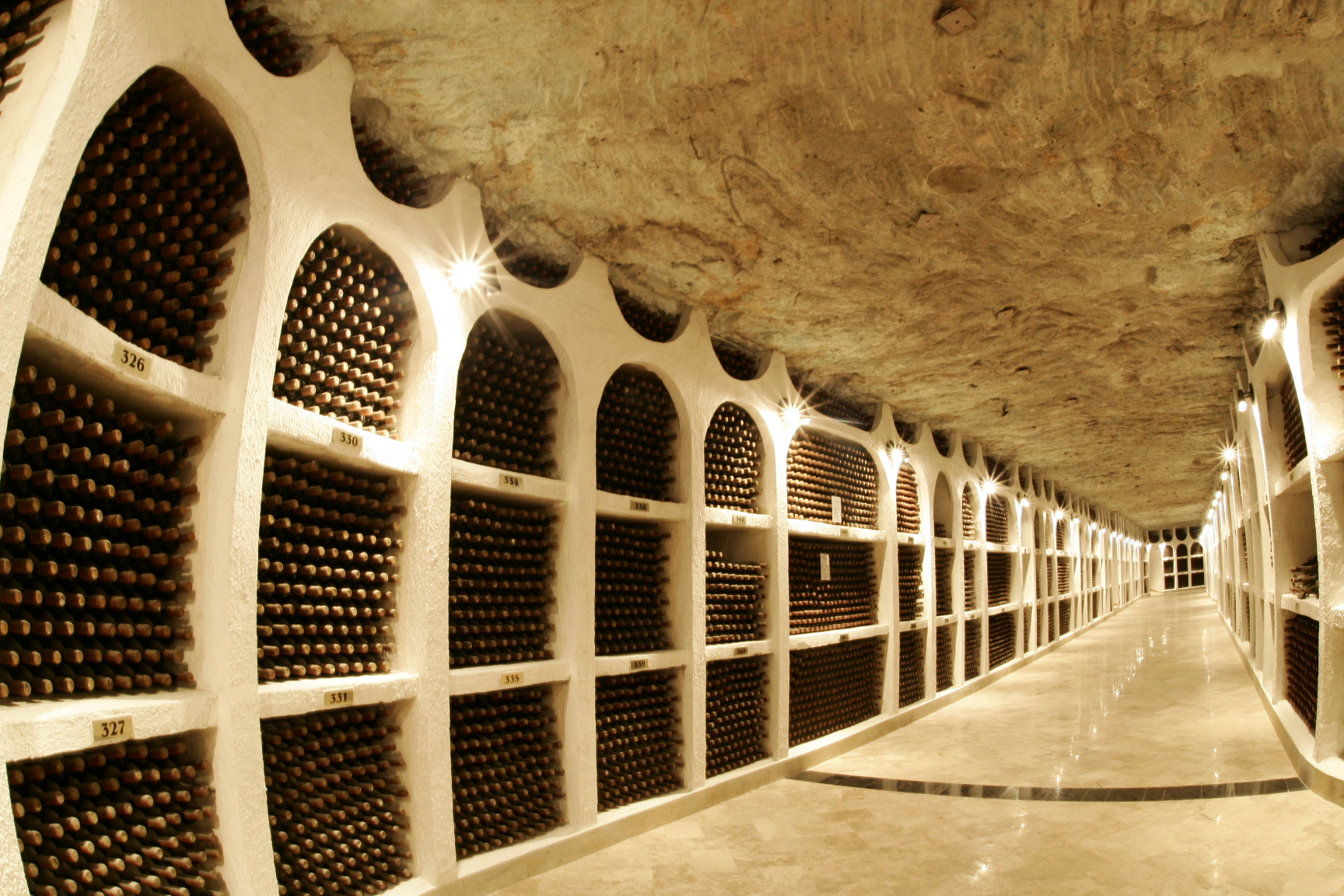
National Enoteca at Cricova

Moldova has a well-established wine industry. With a production of around 2 million hectolitres of wine (as of 2018), it is the 11th largest European wine-producing country. Moldova has a vineyard area of 148,500 hectares (367,000 acres) of which 107,800 hectares (266,000 acres) are used for commercial production. The remaining 40,700 hectares (101,000 acres) are vineyards planted in villages around the houses used to make home-made wine. Many families have their own recipes and strands of grapes that have been passed down through generations. There are 3 historical wine regions: Valul lui Traian (south west), Ștefan Vodă (south east) and Codru (centre), destined for the production of wines with protected geographic indication.

In 2022 the majority of wines were exported, being sent to 75 countries, with 60% of wine produced being exported to European Union countries.

== History ==
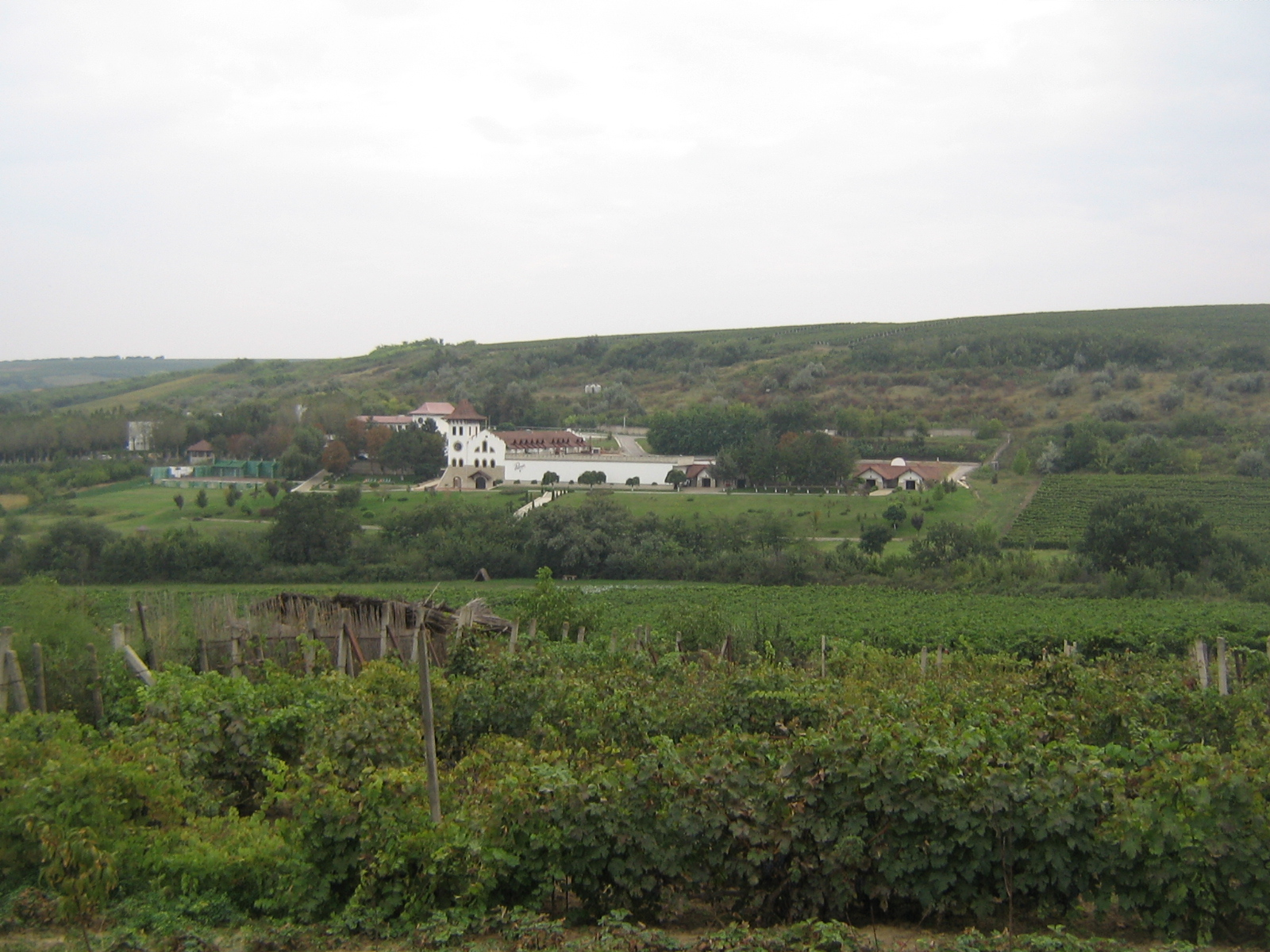
The Purcari winery surrounded by its vineyards. The vineyard in the forefront is a "village" vineyard used for home-made wine.

Fossils of Vitis teutonica vine leaves near the Naslavcea village in the north of Moldova indicate that grapes grew there approximately 6 to 25 million years ago. The size of grape seed imprints found near the Vărvăreuca village, which date back to 2800 BC, prove that grapes were already being cultivated at that time. The grapegrowing and wine-making in the area between the Nistru and Prut rivers, which began 4000–5000 years ago, had periods of rises and falls but has survived through changing social and economic conditions.

By the end of the third century BC, trading links were established between the local population and the Greeks and from 107 AD with the Romans, a fact which strongly influenced the intense development of the grape-growing and wine-making.

After the formation of the Moldavian feudal state in the 14th century, grape-growing began to develop and flourished in the 15th century during the kingdom of Stephen the Great, who promoted the import of high quality varieties and the improvement of the quality of wine, which was one of the chief exports of Moldova throughout the medieval period, especially to Poland, Ukraine and Russia.

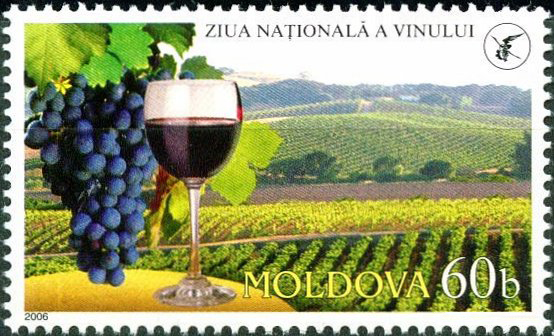
Moldovan postage stamp, dedicated to the National Wine Day

After the Treaty of Bucharest in 1812, when the region became a province of the Russian Empire, the wine industry flourished again. The main varieties were the traditional ones: Rară neagră, Plavaie, Galbenă, Zghiharda, Batuta neagră, Fetească albă, Fetească neagră, Tămâioasă, Cabasia and many other local, Hungarian, Bulgarian, Greek, and Turkish varieties. In this period, the grape growers gained governmental support, and by 1837 the vineyard area in Bessarabia reached 14,000 hectares, with wine production of 12 million litres. The second half of the 19th century saw an intensive planting of newly introduced French varieties, such as Pinot blanc, Pinot noir, Pinot gris, Aligote, Cabernet Sauvignon, Sauvignon blanc, Gamay, Muscat blanc. It was at this time that wines like Negru de Purcari and Romănești, which have made Moldova famous as a fine wine producer, began to be produced.

After the phylloxera damage at the end of the 19th century, it was only in 1906 that the vineyards began to recover with grafted planting material. By 1914, Bessarabia had the biggest vineyard area in the Russian Empire.

Both World Wars damaged Moldovan vineyards and the wine industry. The re-establishment of Moldovan vineyards began in the 1950s, during Soviet rule. Over 150,000 hectares were planted in 10 years, and by 1960 the total vineyard area had reached 220,000 hectares. In the 1980s Russia was suffering from alcoholism and ordered the destruction of vineyards; between 1985 and 1987, 30% were destroyed.

In 2006, a diplomatic conflict with Russia resulted in the 2006 Russian ban of Moldovan and Georgian wines, damaging Moldova's wine industry as Russia had been the largest importer (80%) of Moldovan wines. The ban lasted 2 years. A fresh ban was imposed in September 2013, as a result of Moldova's announcement of plans to sign a draft association treaty with the European Union; this ban was less effective, as Moldova had sought alternative export markets in the intervening years and was producing better quality wines.

The national brand "Wine of Moldova" was created in 2013 by the newly created National Office of Vine and Wine, whose main objective was the promotion of quality Moldovan wine abroad.

In 2022, Moldova was exporting wines from 260 wineries to 75 countries, with 60% of the wine produced being exported to European Union countries.

== Wine growing regions in Moldova ==
In Moldova four regions for wine growing are to be found:

- Bălți (northern zone)
- Codru (central zone)
- Purcari (south-eastern zone)
- Cahul (southern zone)

The most important region — the southern area — is suitable for red sweet and semi-sweet wines. White wines have a high content of alcohol. Micro-regions like Taraclia, Ciumai, Comrat, Ceadîr-Lunga, Baurci, Cazaiac, Tomai, Cimișlia etc. are also in the southern region.

== Grape varieties ==
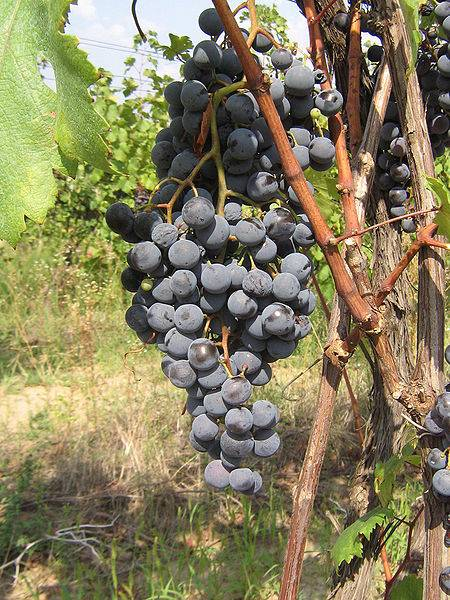
Rară neagră, the main indigenous red variety

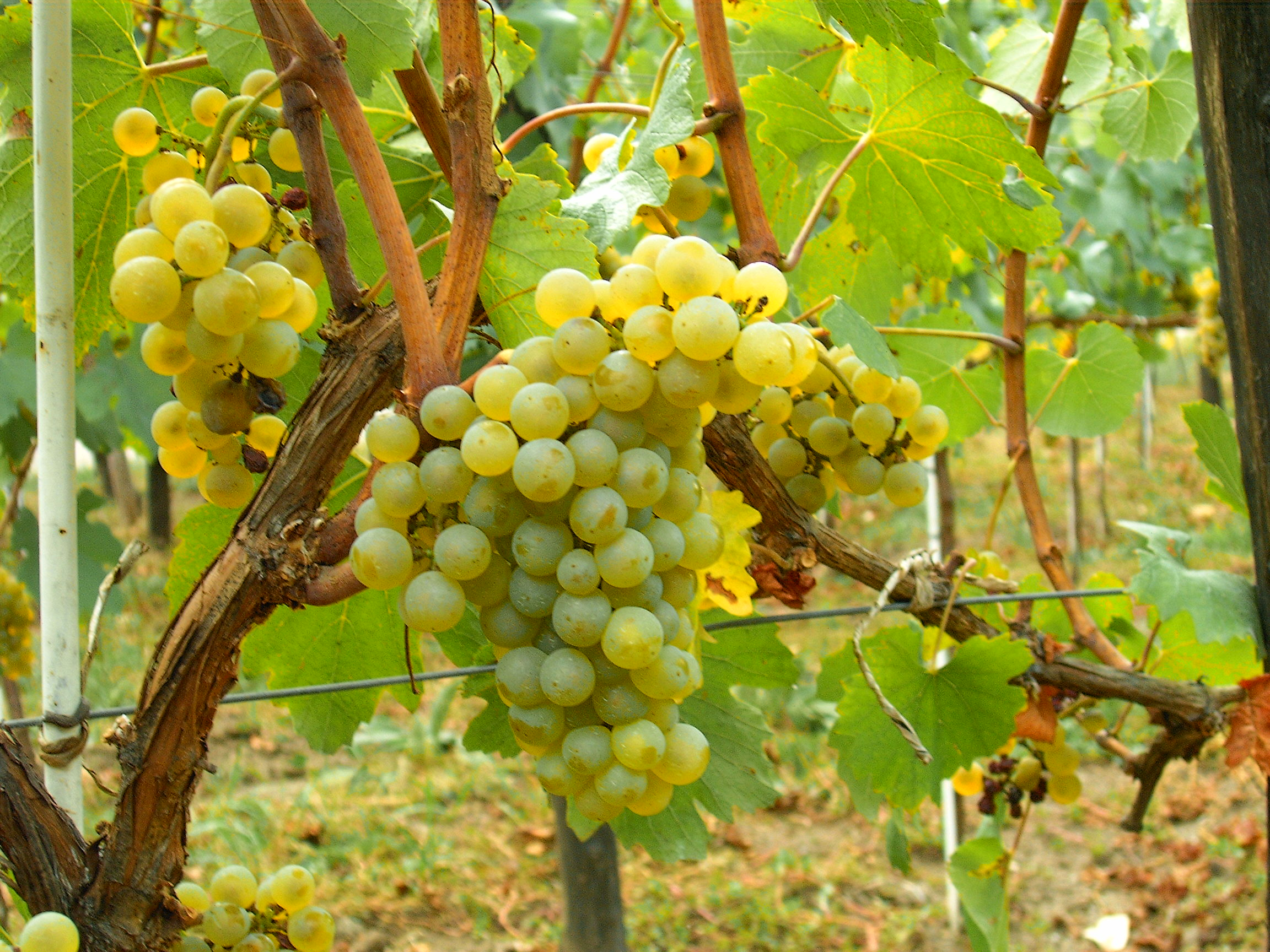
Moldovan Chardonnay

Moldovan viticulture is characterized by a large variety of grapes:

Varieties	Share
White	70%
Red	24%
Table	6%

Types	Share
European	70%
Domestic	16%
Caucasian	14%

=== Local varieties ===
Only a few local varieties can still be found in Moldova today:

- Fetească albă: Indigenous white variety;
- Fetească regală: White variety, a natural cross between Fetească albă and Furmint;
- Rară neagră: Red variety traditionally used mostly for blending with other varieties, e.g. the famous Negru de Purcari. Responsible for the fame of the Purcari wines in the 18th century, before Cabernet Sauvignon was introduced. Total area planted — 170 hectares, mostly in the Purcari region;
- Fetească neagră: Red grape variety;
- Plavaie: White variety, popular in the 19th century and at the beginning of the 20th century. This variety is now rare;
- Busuioacă albă: white aromatic variety.

=== Introduced varieties ===
White varieties: Chardonnay, Sauvignon blanc, Aligoté, Pinot gris, Pinot blanc, Riesling, Traminer, Muscat, Silvaner, Müller-Thurgau, Rkatsiteli.

Red varieties: Cabernet Sauvignon, Merlot, Pinot noir, Malbec, Saperavi, Gamay.

Recently: Syrah, Cabernet Franc, Petit Verdot, Carignan, Montepulciano, Sémillon, Ugni blanc, and Tempranillo were conditionally registered for trial.

== Divin ==
Divin is the name of the country's brandy, produced in conformity with the classic technology of cognac production.

== Cellars ==
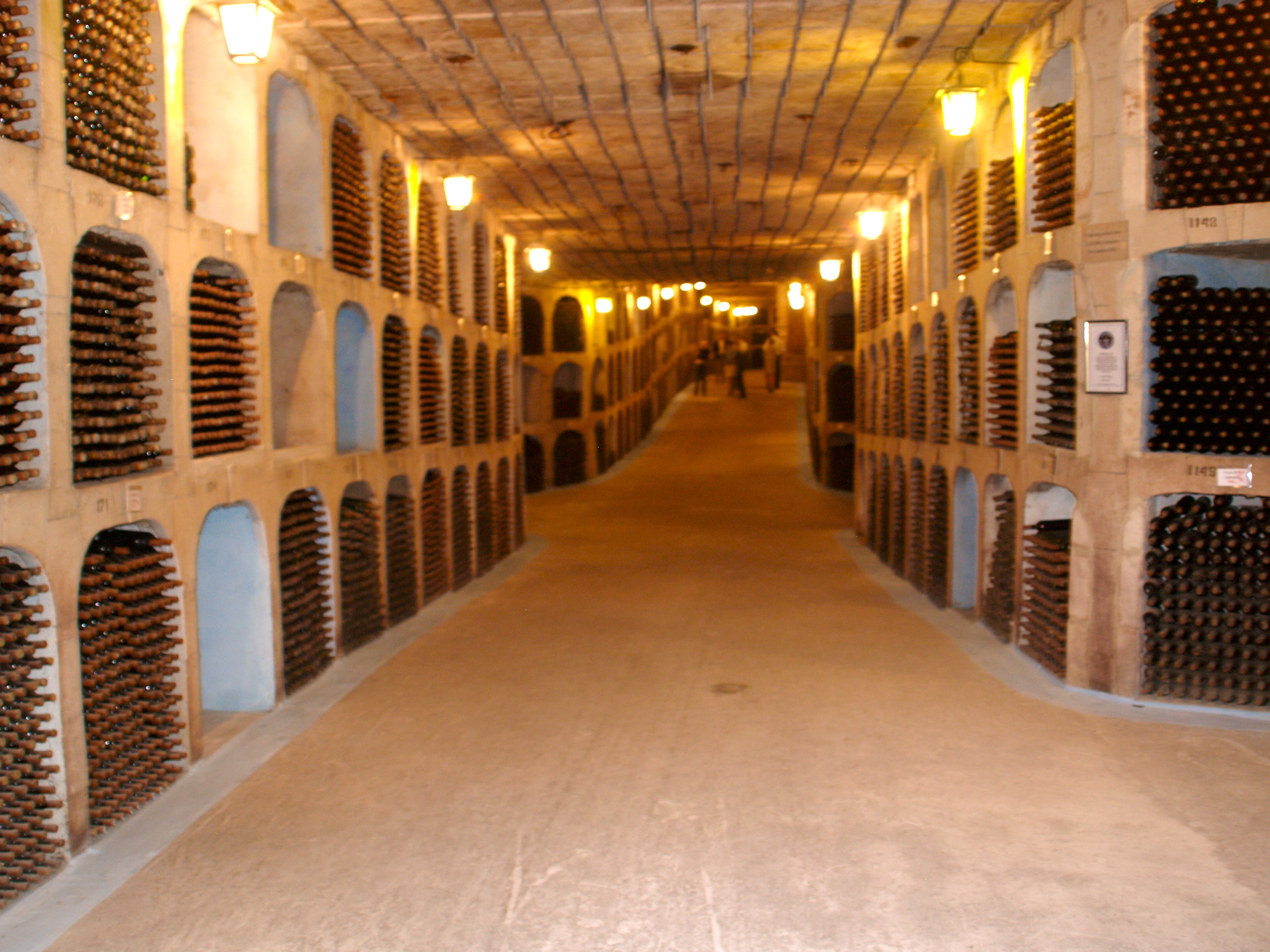
Mileștii Mici – the world's largest wine cellars

The Moldovan wine collection "Mileștii Mici", with 1.5 million bottles, is the largest wine collection in the world, according to the Guinness Book. It stretches for 200 km and has a relative humidity of 85-95% and a constant temperature of 12-14 °C.

The Cricova winery also has an extensive network of tunnels that stretch for 120 km.

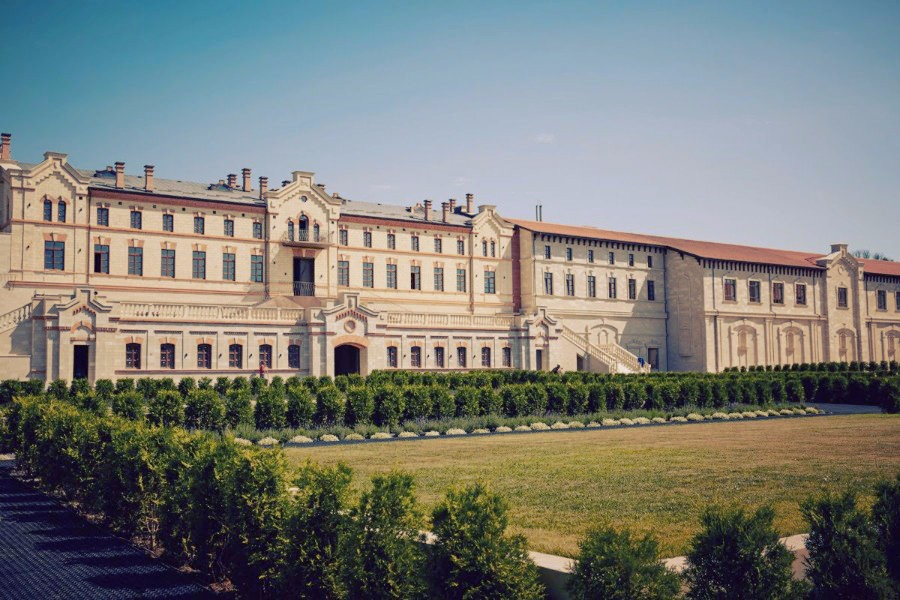
Mimi Wine Castle

== Wine Guild ==
The Moldova Wine Guild is a non-profit association established in August 2007 by several of Moldova's leading private wineries, i.e. Acorex Wine Holding, Vinaria Bostavan, Chateau Vartely, DK-Intertrade, Carlevana, Lion-Gri, and Vinaria Purcari. The association's stated goal is to raise Moldova's profile as a major European wine producing country. To accomplish this goal, members work together to promote their wines on the international market through joint marketing initiatives and to educate the international wine trade and press about Moldova.

== Moldovan wineries ==
- Asconi Winery
- Aroma
- Cricova
- KVINT
- Mileștii Mici
- Purcari
- Romănești
- Aurelius
- Maurt

== See also ==
- Moldovan cuisine
- Wine competition
- Winemaking
- Agriculture in Moldova
