= Vihtori Aromaa =

Finnish bricklayer and politician

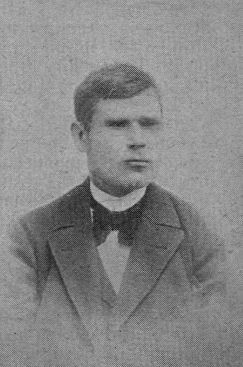

Member of the Finland Parliament for Mikkeli
- In office 22 May 1907 – 31 July 1908

Personal details
- Born: Vihtori Antinpoika Qvist or Zvist; 9 November 1872 Sysmä, Finland
- Died: 27 May 1932 (aged 59) Sysmä, Finland
- Party: Social Democratic Party of Finland
- Occupation: Bricklayer

Viktor (Vihtori) Aromaa (9 November 1872, Sysmä - 27 May 1932; surname until 1906 Zvist) was a Finnish bricklayer and politician. He was a member of the Parliament of Finland from 1907 to 1908, representing the Social Democratic Party of Finland (SDP).
