= Cricova =

- Town
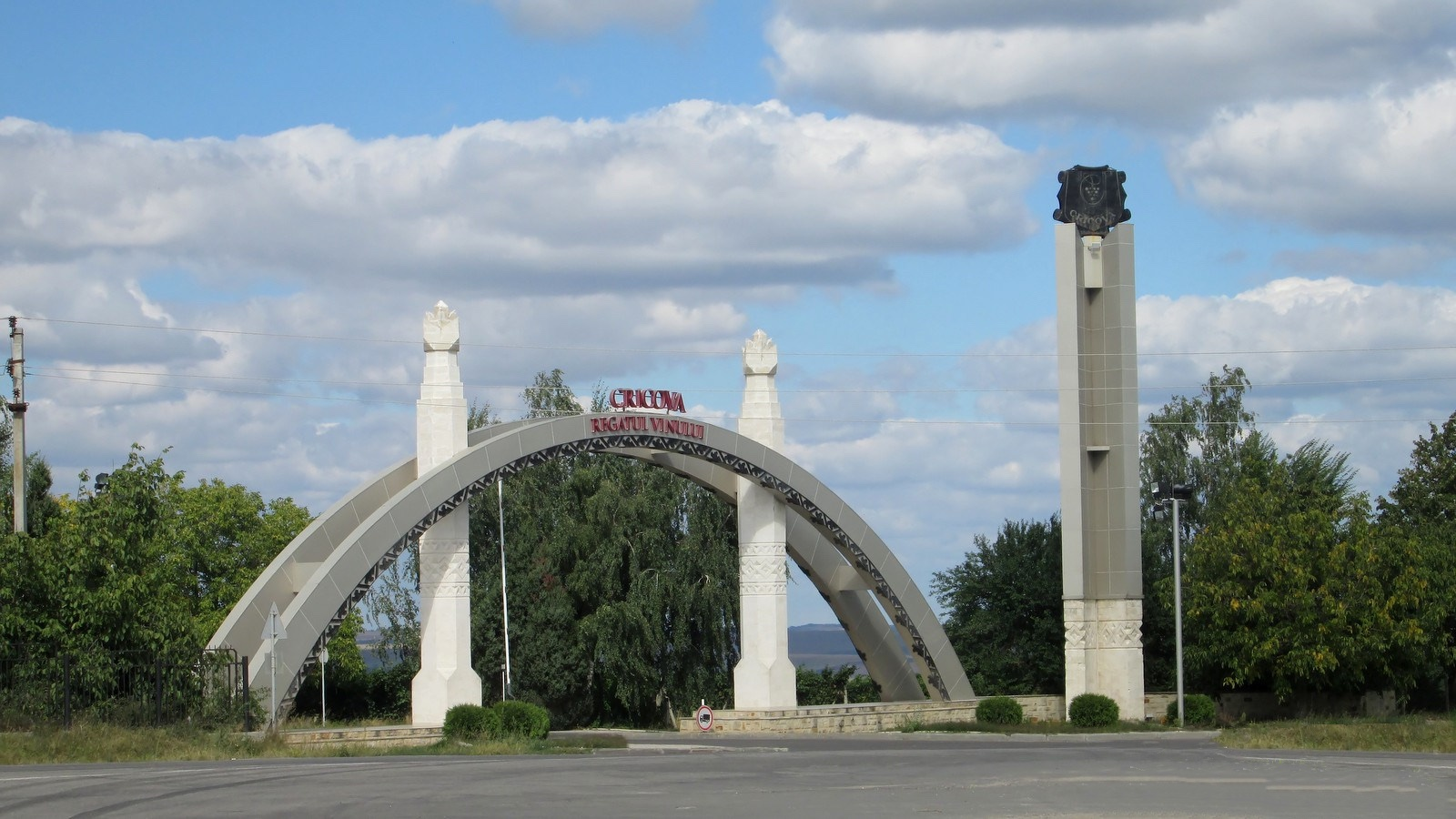

- Location within Moldova
- Coordinates: 47°8′N 28°51′E
- Country: Moldova
- Municipality: Chișinău

Government
  - Mayor: Victor Slobozianu (MAN)
- Elevation: 122 m (400 ft)

Population (2024)
  - Total: 9,536
- Time zone: UTC+2 (EET)
  - Summer (DST): UTC+3 (EEST)
- Area code: +373 22
- Website: Official website

Cricova (Romanian pronunciation: [ˈkrikova]) is a town in Chișinău municipality, Moldova, located 15 kilometres (9.3 mi) north of the capital. It is best known for its vast underground wine cellars, among the largest in the world, which have made Cricova one of Moldova’s leading tourist destinations.

== Overview ==
The town of Cricova was first mentioned on July 31, 1431, under the name Vadul-Pietrei (“Stone Ford”). Later, the name Cricău appeared in Zamfir Arbore’s geographical calendar, eventually evolving into the modern name Cricova.

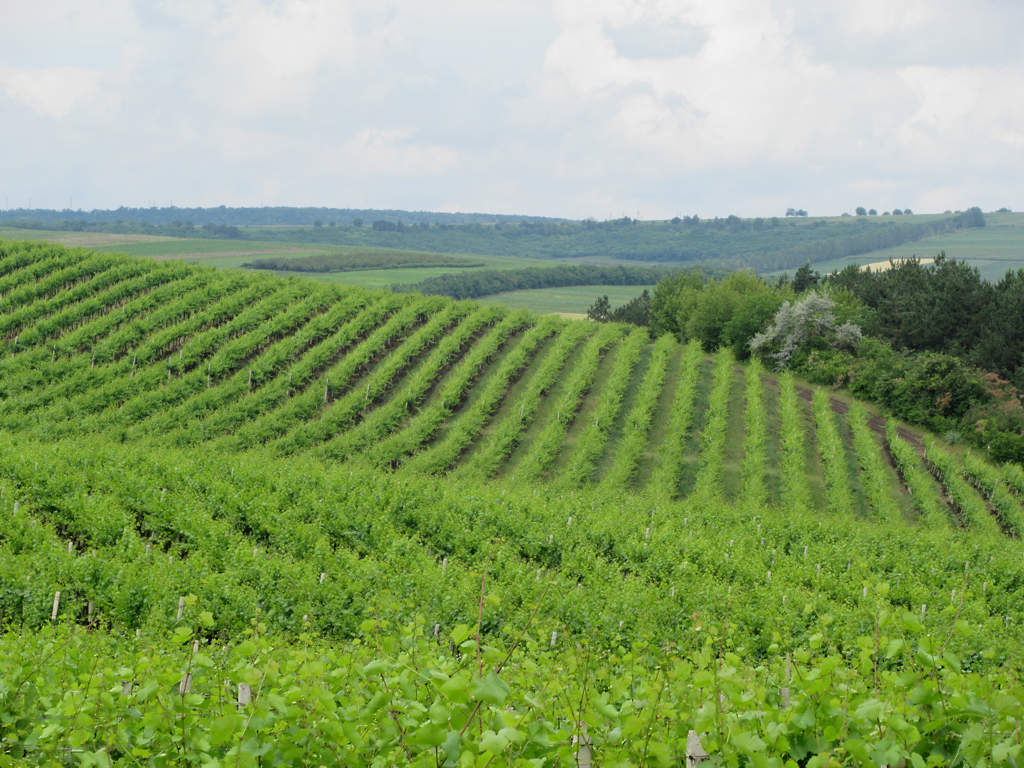
Vineyard at Cricova

Cricova lies near the Ichel River, a tributary of the Dniester that supplies water to Chișinău. The town itself does not draw water from the Ichel. A lake located near the river’s northern section, close to the entrance of the Cricova wine cellars, has traditionally been used for fishing and recreation.

Near the town are several mines used for limestone extraction, some of which are more than 50 years old.

== Demographics ==
According to the 2024 census, 9,536 inhabitants lived in Cricova, a decrease compared to the previous census in 2014, when 10,669 inhabitants were registered.

Ethnic composition of Cricova (2024)
1. Moldovans (Note: There is an ongoing controversy regarding the ethnic identification of Moldovans and Romanians.) (82.5%)
2. Romanians (9.00%)
3. Russians (3.80%)
4. Ukrainians (2.90%)
5. Others (1.70%)
Linguistic composition of Cricova (2024)
1. Romanian (44.1%)
2. Moldovan (Note: In March 2023, the Parliament of Moldova passed a law updating all legislative texts and the constitution to refer to the national language as Romanian, effectively rendering the term "Moldovan" obsolete.) (40.8%)
3. Russian (13.2%)
4. Ukrainian (1.10%)
5. Other (0.80%)

Historical population
Year	Pop.	±%
1979	5,490	—
1989	7,164	+30.5%
2004	9,878	+37.9%
2014	10,669	+8.0%
2024	9,536	−10.6%

== The geographical indication Cricova for wine ==
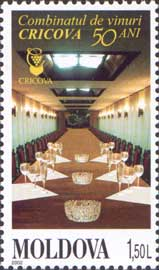
Tasting room at the Cricova winery

Cricova is famous for its underground labyrinths. The greatest part of Cricova’s wine production facilities is placed underground, at a depth of 60-80 meters, creating a huge underground wine city with avenues, streets and broadways. These labyrinths offer a unique, favorable microclimate that gives typicity to the wines. All year round, the naturally constant temperature there remains at +12° to +14°C, and the humidity at about 97 per cent to 98 per cent, the most propitious conditions for developing and aging fine wines.

By adopting Law No. 322-XV of 18.07.2003 on the Declaration of the Complex “Combinatul de Vinuri “Cricova” S.A.,” an Object of the National-Cultural Heritage of the Republic of Moldova, the Parliament created a special regime for the use of the geographical indication Cricova for wine.

== Twin Towns ==
- Noceto, Italy

== Gallery ==
The end of the Chişinău Street, is a major road.
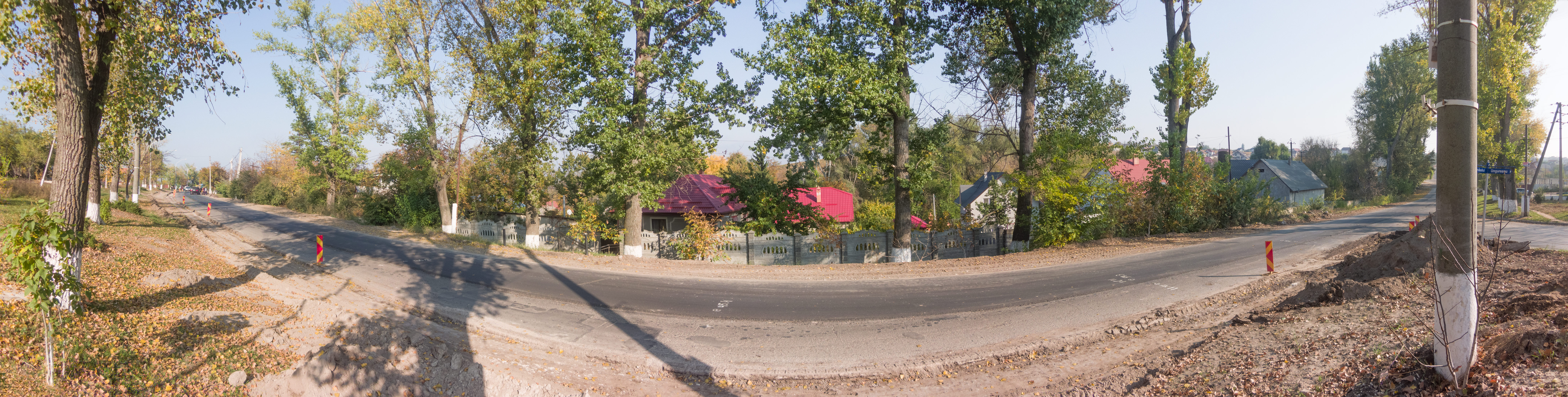

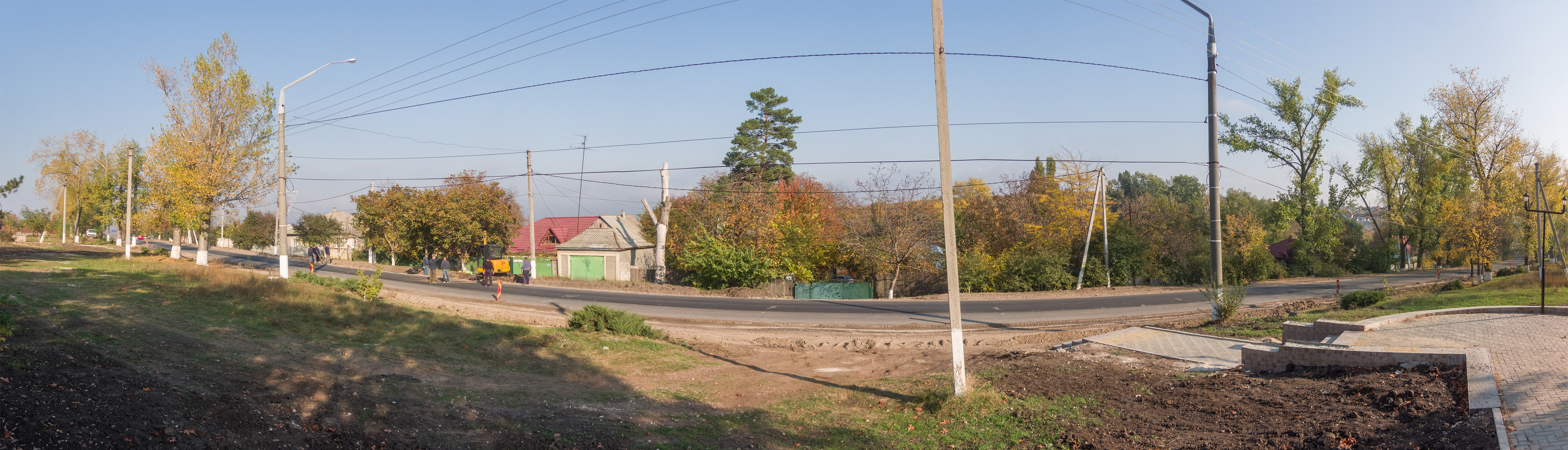
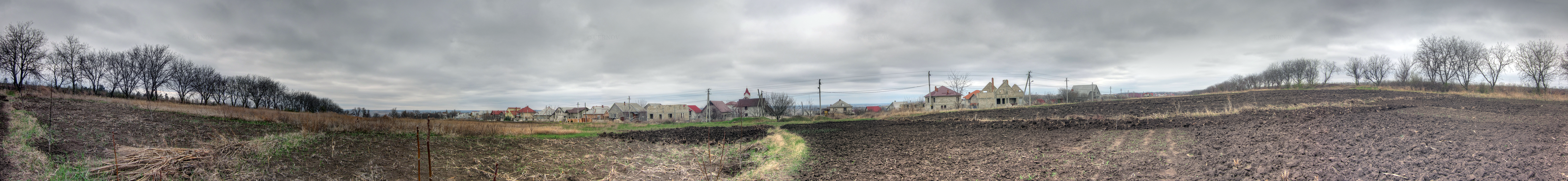
The view from the field. 47.130845°N 28.857864°E
