= July 2009 Moldovan parliamentary election =

- 29 July 2009
- All 101 seats in Parliament; 51 seats needed for a majority
- Turnout: 58.77% (▲1.2pp)
| Party | Leader | Vote % | Seats | +/– |
|---|---|---|---|---|
| PCRM | Vladimir Voronin | 44.69 | 48 | −12 |
| PLDM | Vlad Filat | 16.57 | 18 | +3 |
| PL | Mihai Ghimpu | 14.68 | 15 | 0 |
| PDM | Marian Lupu | 12.54 | 13 | +13 |
| AMN | Serafim Urechean | 7.35 | 7 | −4 |
This lists parties that won seats. See the complete results below.
| Prime Minister before | Prime Minister after |
|---|---|
| Zinaida Greceanîi; PCRM | Vlad Filat; PLDM |
| Cabinet before | Cabinet after |
|---|---|
| Second Greceanîi Cabinet; PCRM | First Filat Cabinet; PLDM–PL–PDM–AMN |

Early parliamentary elections were held in Moldova on 29 July 2009. The Party of Communists of the Republic of Moldova (PCRM) won 48 of the 101 seats, but lost the majority they had won in the April elections.

== Background ==
The country's parliament, elected months earlier, was dissolved by president Vladimir Voronin on 15 June 2009, after it had twice failed to elect a new president.

Before the dissolution of the parliament, the electoral threshold was lowered from 6% to 5% and the minimum participation rate was lowered from half the electorate to a third of the electorate. A poll from mid-July gave the PCRM only 29.7%, with the combined opposition (including the Democratic Party of Moldova now led by PCRM defector Marian Lupu) at over 40%. PCRM leader Voronin did not rule out entering into a "grand coalition" with the opposition parties if the election results were inconclusive.

== Conduct ==
Five Ukrainian election observers within the European Network of Election Monitoring Organizations (ENEMO) were deported from Moldova the day before the elections. According to the expelled observers, the Central Election Commission of Moldova registered only 55 of the 140 observers from ENEMO.

== Results ==
Voronin's party, the PCRM, received around 45% of the vote, whilst the other four parties that won seats each received between 7% and 16%. However, the combined opposition parties secured more seats, and went in discussion over forming a coalition. This has led some commentators to declare the election a loss for the Communists.

Results of the election, showing vote strength by commune.

| Party | Votes | % | Seats | +/– |
|---|---|---|---|---|
| Party of Communists | 706,732 | 44.69 | 48 | –12 |
| Liberal Democratic Party | 262,028 | 16.57 | 18 | +3 |
| Liberal Party | 232,108 | 14.68 | 15 | 0 |
| Democratic Party | 198,268 | 12.54 | 13 | +13 |
| Our Moldova Alliance | 116,194 | 7.35 | 7 | –4 |
| Christian-Democratic People's Party | 30,236 | 1.91 | 0 | 0 |
| Social Democratic Party | 29,434 | 1.86 | 0 | 0 |
| Ecologist Party of Moldova "Green Alliance" | 6,517 | 0.41 | 0 | New |
| Total | 1,581,517 | 100.00 | 101 | 0 |
| Valid votes | 1,581,517 | 99.36 | | |
| Invalid/blank votes | 10,240 | 0.64 | | |
| Total votes | 1,591,757 | 100.00 | | |
| Registered voters/turnout | 2,708,381 | 58.77 | | |
Source: eDemocracy

=== By district ===
| # | District | Registered | Voted | Turnout | Valid votes | PCRM | PLDM | PL | PDM | AMN | PPCD | PSD | PEAVM |
|---|---|---|---|---|---|---|---|---|---|---|---|---|---|
| 1 | Chișinău | 618,910 | 385,179 | 62.24% | 383,344 | 41.23% | 16.89% | 23.14% | 10.55% | 5.62% | 1.15% | 0.96% | 0.47% |
| 2 | Bălți | 107,163 | 57,245 | 53.42% | 56,894 | 58.16% | 12.82% | 7.64% | 15.60% | 2.87% | 1.15% | 1.33% | 0.43% |
| 3 | Găgăuzia | 103,517 | 57,690 | 55.73% | 57,276 | 77.78% | 1.28% | 0.43% | 5.88% | 3.73% | 0.69% | 9.87% | 0.35% |
| 4 | Anenii Noi | 70,140 | 39,649 | 56.53% | 39,402 | 47.92% | 18.04% | 14.26% | 11.05% | 5.13% | 2.11% | 1.08% | 0.41% |
| 5 | Basarabeasca | 17,098 | 12,560 | 73.46% | 12,481 | 52.05% | 13.25% | 5.50% | 10.49% | 7.59% | 1.22% | 9.26% | 0.64% |
| 6 | Briceni | 58,089 | 35,468 | 61.06% | 35,207 | 57.61% | 9.60% | 7.27% | 14.63% | 7.09% | 2.08% | 1.32% | 0.41% |
| 7 | Cahul | 92,173 | 53,594 | 58.15% | 53,303 | 38.36% | 23.52% | 15.89% | 10.66% | 7.69% | 2.37% | 1.20% | 0.32% |
| 8 | Cantemir | 43,480 | 25,761 | 59.25% | 25,596 | 40.81% | 24.93% | 11.04% | 10.07% | 9.79% | 1.74% | 1.13% | 0.48% |
| 9 | Călărași | 60,966 | 34,020 | 55.80% | 33,794 | 32.10% | 17.59% | 19.71% | 10.02% | 16.35% | 2.25% | 1.49% | 0.49% |
| 10 | Căușeni | 69,108 | 39,285 | 56.85% | 39,041 | 44.26% | 12.46% | 12.12% | 8.91% | 16.78% | 3.78% | 1.29% | 0.39% |
| 11 | Cimișlia | 44,665 | 25,686 | 57.51% | 25,541 | 43.98% | 16.51% | 9.33% | 16.10% | 10.50% | 1.81% | 1.41% | 0.37% |
| 12 | Criuleni | 57,324 | 34,331 | 59.89% | 34,069 | 34.23% | 16.85% | 20.11% | 13.29% | 11.18% | 2.92% | 1.04% | 0.38% |
| 13 | Dondușeni | 33,223 | 21,378 | 64.35% | 21,199 | 58.94% | 10.08% | 5.57% | 14.16% | 3.91% | 3.72% | 3.26% | 0.37% |
| 14 | Drochia | 67,723 | 39,324 | 58.07% | 39,055 | 49.69% | 16.22% | 8.57% | 16.28% | 5.13% | 2.03% | 1.71% | 0.36% |
| 15 | Dubăsari | 25,286 | 16,230 | 64.19% | 16,099 | 67.92% | 8.55% | 7.51% | 8.68% | 4.55% | 1.57% | 0.82% | 0.40% |
| 16 | Edineț | 64,123 | 38,219 | 59.60% | 37,938 | 57.29% | 8.15% | 4.82% | 18.34% | 6.98% | 1.37% | 2.78% | 0.27% |
| 17 | Fălești | 71,198 | 39,507 | 55.49% | 39,230 | 52.09% | 13.65% | 7.55% | 17.14% | 4.57% | 2.36% | 2.32% | 0.34% |
| 18 | Florești | 68,643 | 42,202 | 61.48% | 41,761 | 54.39% | 17.55% | 4.90% | 15.30% | 4.82% | 1.62% | 1.07% | 0.34% |
| 19 | Glodeni | 46,981 | 25,916 | 55.16% | 25,727 | 47.72% | 18.90% | 8.43% | 13.44% | 7.59% | 1.71% | 1.87% | 0.34% |
| 20 | Hîncești | 89,494 | 50,604 | 56.54% | 50,265 | 33.00% | 28.05% | 14.12% | 16.48% | 5.15% | 1.75% | 1.15% | 0.30% |
| 21 | Ialoveni | 76,092 | 46,648 | 61.30% | 46,334 | 25.02% | 24.79% | 23.16% | 11.91% | 11.81% | 1.80% | 0.96% | 0.55% |
| 22 | Leova | 42,039 | 22,299 | 53.04% | 22,119 | 41.23% | 15.31% | 10.99% | 14.25% | 12.87% | 3.02% | 1.80% | 0.53% |
| 23 | Nisporeni | 49,284 | 28,389 | 57.60% | 28,215 | 27.18% | 22.67% | 27.01% | 6.88% | 13.17% | 1.50% | 1.01% | 0.58% |
| 24 | Ocnița | 39,601 | 25,497 | 64.38% | 25,322 | 65.92% | 9.00% | 3.82% | 14.72% | 3.66% | 1.19% | 1.34% | 0.35% |
| 25 | Orhei | 93,595 | 54,553 | 58.29% | 54,162 | 29.51% | 20.78% | 18.74% | 16.93% | 7.95% | 1.65% | 4.02% | 0.42% |
| 26 | Rezina | 37,258 | 23,493 | 63.05% | 23,295 | 48.83% | 19.24% | 10.65% | 11.44% | 4.97% | 3.47% | 1.03% | 0.36% |
| 27 | Rîșcani | 54,232 | 30,752 | 56.70% | 30,541 | 51.09% | 13.36% | 8.87% | 16.10% | 6.51% | 1.99% | 1.74% | 0.33% |
| 28 | Sîngerei | 67,133 | 36,123 | 53.81% | 35,913 | 43.43% | 16.97% | 9.36% | 20.09% | 6.18% | 2.24% | 1.42% | 0.31% |
| 29 | Soroca | 74,965 | 42,798 | 57.09% | 42,434 | 48.65% | 13.38% | 7.96% | 16.09% | 10.57% | 1.21% | 1.77% | 0.37% |
| 30 | Strășeni | 73,756 | 41,404 | 56.14% | 41,123 | 32.86% | 18.07% | 21.17% | 12.02% | 10.96% | 2.36% | 2.05% | 0.51% |
| 31 | Șoldănești | 33,163 | 19,431 | 58.59% | 19,279 | 44.90% | 13.81% | 8.50% | 12.66% | 14.13% | 4.15% | 1.45% | 0.39% |
| 32 | Ștefan Vodă | 53,048 | 30,406 | 57.32% | 30,204 | 36.52% | 21.69% | 14.31% | 8.69% | 8.04% | 8.53% | 1.84% | 0.38% |
| 33 | Taraclia | 31,041 | 19,856 | 63.97% | 19,699 | 80.70% | 2.97% | 1.20% | 10.05% | 1.93% | 0.78% | 1.96% | 0.41% |
| 34 | Telenești | 51,786 | 30,348 | 58.60% | 30,166 | 31.94% | 26.09% | 11.78% | 12.64% | 12.97% | 2.47% | 1.72% | 0.39% |
| 35 | Ungheni | 85,655 | 48,368 | 56.47% | 48,007 | 46.68% | 14.52% | 12.96% | 12.96% | 7.56% | 1.78% | 2.64% | 0.35% |
| 36 | Diplomatic missions | 36,429 | 17,544 | 48.16% | 17,482 | 8.49% | 32.12% | 43.78% | 5.88% | 5.75% | 2.51% | 1.00% | 0.46% |
| | Total | 2,603,158 | 1,591,757 | 58.77% | 1,581,517 | 44.69% | 16.57% | 14.68% | 12.54% | 7.35% | 1.91 | 1.86% | 0.41% |

== Reactions ==
The Organization for Security and Cooperation in Europe, which was observing the election, said that whilst evidence had been found of "subtle intimidation and media bias", it concluded that major electoral fraud did not occur.

After the results had been announced, Voronin acknowledged that there had been a swing in the popular vote against his party, and said he wants a "principled dialogue with all the political forces." Neither the Communists nor the opposition parties combined had the three-fifths of parliament, 61 seats, necessary to elect a new president without gaining the support of some members of the other side.

Michael Schwirtz of the New York Times said the reason the Communists did not gain a majority of the vote was unknown, though said it could have been the defection of Marian Lupu, a former parliamentary speaker, from the Communists to the Democratic Party of Moldova, which won 13 seats in this election. Lupu was suggested as the next president.

== Aftermath ==
On 8 August 2009 four parties – Liberal Democratic Party (PLDM), the Liberal Party (PL), the Democratic Party (PDM), and the Our Moldova Alliance (AMN) – agreed to create a governing coalition named the Alliance for European Integration (AIE), their combined 53 seats being enough to push the Communist party (PCRM) into opposition.

== Elected MPs ==
Results of the July 2009 Moldovan parliamentary election

The list of deputies elected in the 29 July 2009 parliamentary elections:

Party of Communists (PCRM)

1. Vladimir Voronin 1941, engineer-economist, jurist, Party of Communists of the Republic of Moldova leader
2. Zinaida Greceanîi 1956, economist, the Prime Minister of Moldova.
3. Vladimir Țurcan 1954, lawyer, former vice president of the Parliament of the Republic of Moldova
4. Victor Mândru 1959, engineer-technologist, master in International Relations, former MP
5. Mark Tkaciuk 1966, PhD in history, former MP
6. Igor Dodon 1975, economist, PhD in Economy, First Vice Prime Minister
7. Vladimir Vitiuc 1972, economist from Bălți, former MP
8. Victor Stepaniuc 1958, pedagog, PhD in history, Vice Prime Minister
9. Eugenia Ostapciuc 1947, engineer-technologist, former President of the Moldovan Parliament, former MP
10. Vladimir Eremciuc 1951, physician from Ocnița, former MP
11. Maria Postoico 1950, lawyer, former MP
12. Ivan Calin 1935, agronomist, PhD in Economy, diplomat, former MP, former Prime Minister of Moldova.
13. Galina Balmoș 1961, pedagog from Strășeni, minister of the Ministry of Social Protection Family and Child
14. Valentin Guznac 1961, Mechanical engineer, jurist, Unemployed, minister of the Ministry of Public Administration
15. Anatolie Popușoi 1949, agronomist, director "Moldsilva", former MP
16. Dmitrii Todoroglo 1944, agronomist, former MP, brother-in-law of Vladimir Voronin
17. Grigore Petrenco 1980, economist, former MP, member Party of the European Left
18. Vasilii Șova 1959, jurist, minister, Moldovan Reintegration Ministry
19. Svetlana Rusu 1972, physician from Florești, Moldova, former MP
20. Iurie Munteanu 1972, economist, MBA, Deputy Minister of Economy and Trade, former MP
21. Igor Vremea 1973, lawyer from Mereșeni, PhD in law, former MP
22. Veronica Abramciuc 1958 historian
23. Aliona Babiuc 1969, pedagog, historian from Briceni, former MP
24. Elena Bondarenco 1965, economist from Soroca, former MP
25. Vadim Mișin 1945, lawyer, PhD in law, former MP
26. Alla Mironic 1941, Professor, PhD in Pedagogy, former MP
27. Vasile Iovv 1942, economist, PhD in Economy, former MP
28. Svetlana Popa 1964, mathematician-cybernetic, alderman, chief of Party of Communists in the City Council of Chișinău.
29. Violeta Ivanov 1967, environmental engineer, minister of the Ministry of Ecology and Natural Resources
30. Raisa Spinovschi 1972, economist-accountant from Cocieri, former MP
31. Anatolie Zagorodnîi 1973, lawyer from Hîncești, master in economic law
32. Miron Anton 1941, agronomist, former MP
33. Irina Vlah 1974, lawyer from Comrat, PhD in law, member Party of the European Left
34. Oleg Reidman 1952, specialist in radiofizica and electronic, former MP
35. Oxana Radu 1976, lawyer, superior consultant, Territorial Administrative Department, Ungheni (Direcția teritorială control administrativ Ungheni)
36. Zinaida Chistruga 1954, General Director of Licensing Chamber of Moldova
37. Ludmila Belcencova 1972, historian, former MP
38. Ghenadie Morcov 1965, physician from Drochia, former MP
39. Oxana Domenti 1972, economist, PhD in Economy, former MP
40. Inna Șupac 1984, anthropologist, master in anthropology, former MP
41. Stoicov Iurie 1955, mechanical engineer from Călărași, Moldova, former MP
42. Ștefan Grigoriev 1949, physicist from Căușeni, specialist in optics and spectroscopy, former MP
43. Eduard Mușuc 1975, alderman, international economic relations, director, ICS "Zalmoxis Grup" SRL
44. Petru Porcescu 1953, cadastral engineer from Strășeni, former MP
45. Tatiana Botnariuc 1967, pedagog, director of the Territorial Social Security Office Dondușeni
46. Oleg Babenco 1968, PhD in History, rector Slavic University of Chișinău, former MP
47. Natalia Vâsotina 1970, pedagog, former MP
48. Oleg Garizan 1971, historian, mayor of Copceac, Gagauzia

On December 15, 2009, PCRM MPs Vladimir Țurcan, Victor Stepaniuc, Ludmila Belcencova, and Valentin Guznac left the Party of Communists' parliamentary faction, on grounds that the concerned group of lawmakers did not agree with the latest decisions by the PCRM's leadership. On March 17, 2010, Svetlana Popa left the Party of Communists' parliamentary faction.

Liberal Democratic Party (PLDM)

1. Vladimir Filat 1969, Liberal Democratic Party leader, degree in law, former MP
2. Alexandru Tănase 1971, degree in law, Vice President Liberal Democratic Party, former MP
3. Mihai Godea 1974, Vice President Liberal Democratic Party, professor, former MP
4. Liliana Palihovici 1971, Professor, former MP
5. Vitalie Nagacevschi 1965, lawyer, former MP
6. Iurie Țap 1955, pedagogue, mayor Florești, Moldova
7. Călin Vieru 1965, neurologist doctor, lawyer, former MP
8. Ion Balan 1962, agronomist from Lingura, Cantemir District, former MP
9. Vladimir Hotineanu 1950, physician surgeon, PhD, former MP
10. Iurie Leancă 1963, expert in international relations from Ialoveni, former MP
11. Valeriu Ghilețchi 1960, radio engineer, degree in theology, former MP
12. Mihail Șleahtițchi 1956, Professor from Bălți, PhD, former MP
13. Angel Agache 1976, degree in economics and law, master's degree in political management, former MP
14. Alexandru Cimbriciuc 1968, lawyer from Soroca, former MP
15. Simion Furdui 1963, specialist in public administration, former MP
16. Veceslav Ioniță 1973, economist, public administration, lecturer Academy of Economic Studies of Moldova
17. Valeriu Streleț 1970, lawyer, historian, director, "Bioprotect" SRL
18. Ion Butmălai 1964, lawyer Cahul

Liberal Party (PL)

1. Dorin Chirtoacă 1978, lawyer, General Mayor of Chișinău
2. Mihai Ghimpu 1951, Liberal Party leader, lawyer, former MP
3. Anatol Șalaru 1962, Physician, Liberal Party vice president, businessman
4. Corina Fusu 1959, Biology and Chemistry degree, journalist, Liberal Party vice president, former MP
5. Vadim Cojocaru 1961, economist, PhD in Economy, former MP
6. Anatolie Arhire 1956, engineer from Ungheni, vicepresident of the Ungheni District
7. Gheorghe Brega 1951, physician, former MP
8. Vadim Vacarciuc 1972, pedagog, coach from Bălți, former MP
9. Bodrug Oleg - 1965, physicist, editor, former MP
10. Ana Guțu 1962, philolog, PhD in Philology, Prime vicerector the Free International University of Moldova, Chișinău, former MP
11. Ion Hadârcă 1949, philolog, Professor, writer, former MP
12. Valeriu Nemerenco 1959, lawyer, PhD in Law, pretor Sectorul Buiucani
13. Ion Lupu 1963, forest engineer from Vărzărești, former MP
14. Mihail Moldovanu 1965, physician, PhD in Medicine, former MP
15. Boris Vieru 1957, philologist, Unemployed

Democratic Party (PDM)

1. Marian Lupu 1966, the Democratic Party of Moldova leader, economist, PhD in Economy, former President of the Moldovan Parliament
2. Valeriu Lazăr 1968, mechanical engineer, director "BIS-capital" SRL, former Minister of Economy.
3. Igor Corman 1969, historian, PhD in History, diplomat
4. Andrei Popov 1971, journalist, diplomat, Executive Director, Foreign Policy Association (APE).
5. Aurel Băieșu 1964, lawyer, PhD in Law, lecturer
6. Dumitru Diacov 1952, journalist, former Democratic Party leader, honorary leader of the Democratic Party
7. Oleg Serebrian 1969, historian, PhD in Political Sciences, Vice President Democratic Party
8. Alexandru Stoianoglo 1967, lawyer, "A. Stoianoglo" law firm owner.
9. Marcel Răducan 1967, engineer, PhD in Technical Sciences, lecturer
10. Valeriu Guma 1964, engineer-economist, former member of the Parliamentary Assembly of the Council of Europe (2000–2001)
11. Anatolie Ghilaș 1957, from Codru, Moldova, construction engineer, Court of Accounts of the Republic of Moldova member
12. Valentina Buliga 1961, pharmacist, Master of Laws.
13. Stella Jantuan 1966, historian, sociologist, the head of the analytical-information department within the Parliament of the Republic of Moldova

Our Moldova Alliance (AMN)

1. Serafim Urechean 1950, Party Alliance Our Moldova leader, construction engineer, PhD in Economy, former MP
2. Veaceslav Untilă 1956, vice president of Party Alliance Our Moldova, Mechanical Engineer, lawyer, PhD in Law, lecturer, former president of the National Liberal Party (Moldova), former MP
3. Ion Pleșca 1957, Judge Sectorul Botanica
4. Leonid Bujor 1950, historian, former MP
5. Vasile Balan 1950, philologist, former MP
6. Iurie Colesnic 1955, mechanical engineer, writer, Honoris Causa of the "Universității Umaniste" (Chișinău, 2000), former MP.
7. Veaceslav Platon 1973, lawyer, former MP
