= April 2009 Moldovan parliamentary election =

- 5 April 2009
- All 101 seats in Parliament; 51 seats needed for a majority
- Turnout: 57.55% (▼11.29pp)
| Party | Leader | Vote % | Seats | +/– |
|---|---|---|---|---|
| PCRM | Vladimir Voronin | 49.48 | 60 | +4 |
| PL | Mihai Ghimpu | 13.13 | 15 | New |
| PLDM | Vlad Filat | 12.43 | 15 | New |
| AMN | Serafim Urechean | 9.77 | 11 | −11 |
This lists parties that won seats. See the complete results below.
| Prime Minister before | Prime Minister after |
|---|---|
| Zinaida Greceanîi; PCRM | Zinaida Greceanîi; PCRM |
| Cabinet before | Cabinet after |
|---|---|
| First Greceanîi Cabinet; PCRM | Second Greceanîi Cabinet; PCRM |

Parliamentary elections were held in Moldova on 5 April 2009. The Party of Communists of the Republic of Moldova (PCRM) won a majority of seats (60 out of 101) for the third consecutive occasion. Turnout was 59%, exceeding the 50% necessary for the election to be valid.

Following the elections, Parliament was required to elect a new President of Moldova as the incumbent Vladimir Voronin had to stand down after completing two terms. Presidential elections required the winning candidate to receive at least 61 votes, but the opposition parties refused to vote for the three PCRM-nominated candidates in three rounds of voting between May and June 2009, meaning no president was elected. As a result, early parliamentary elections were held in July.

== Background ==
The European Union called on Moldova to reform its electoral law, which implemented an electoral threshold of 6%, giving smaller parties little chance of entering Parliament. However, President Voronin rejected these calls.

== Results ==
Final results were announced on 8 April 2009; the ruling PCRM failed to gain the 61 seats required to elect the president, leaving the opposition parties with the possibility of forcing a new election. A ballot recount performed on 21 April confirmed the results.

Results of the election, showing vote strength by commune.

| Party | Votes | % | Seats | +/– |
|---|---|---|---|---|
| Party of Communists | 760,551 | 49.48 | 60 | +4 |
| Liberal Party | 201,879 | 13.13 | 15 | New |
| Liberal Democratic Party | 191,113 | 12.43 | 15 | New |
| Our Moldova Alliance | 150,155 | 9.77 | 11 | −11 |
| Social Democratic Party | 56,866 | 3.70 | 0 | 0 |
| Christian-Democratic People's Party | 46,654 | 3.04 | 0 | −11 |
| Democratic Party | 45,698 | 2.97 | 0 | – |
| Centrist Union | 42,211 | 2.75 | 0 | 0 |
| European Action Movement | 15,481 | 1.01 | 0 | New |
| Conservative Party | 4,399 | 0.29 | 0 | New |
| United Moldova Party | 3,357 | 0.22 | 0 | New |
| Republican Party | 1,436 | 0.09 | 0 | 0 |
| Independents | 17,287 | 1.12 | 0 | 0 |
| Total | 1,537,087 | 100.00 | 101 | 0 |
| Valid votes | 1,537,087 | 98.78 | | |
| Invalid/blank votes | 18,996 | 1.22 | | |
| Total votes | 1,556,083 | 100.00 | | |
| Registered voters/turnout | 2,704,103 | 57.55 | | |
Source: eDemocracy

== Reactions ==
The International Election Observation Mission, represented by delegations from the OSCE Parliamentary Assembly, Office for Democratic Institutions and Human Rights (ODIHR), Parliamentary Assembly of the Council of Europe (PACE), and the European Parliament evaluated the elections as positive on the whole, with some reservations not affecting the outcome or the overall initial assessment. The opinion polls before the elections had shown a comfortable win for the Communist Party, with the only uncertainty being the size of the winning margin.

The OSCE observer mission has issued a preliminary report declaring the elections generally free and fair and describing Moldova as an "overall pluralistic environment, offering voters a distinct political alternative and meeting many of the O.S.C.E. and Council of Europe commitments." Petros Efthymiou, head of the delegation of the OSCE Parliamentary Assembly and Special Co-ordinator of the OSCE short-term observers, said that he was delighted at the progress of democracy in Moldova. "These elections were very good and they gave me great confidence in the future of this country," Efthyimou said.

However, one member of the 280-strong observation team, Emma Nicholson, Baroness Nicholson of Winterbourne, whose observation post was near the border of the separatist republic of Transnistria, voiced concern over this evaluation, claiming that she had a "very, very strong feeling" that there have been some manipulation, but she "couldn't find any proof" of it. She claimed that the Russians from the organization influenced this report. She also declared that at the counting of the votes that at 1:00 the PCRM had 35% of the votes and the 15–16 parties from the opposition 40–45% altogether while shortly later, at 8:00 the situation changed radically and the PCRM had 50%. There have also been claims of voter fraud, with deceased and nonattendant persons reportedly voting. The main organiser of the fraud has been allegedly Vladimir Molojen, a close friend of businessman Boris Birshtein.

Following the recount, it was decided by the Constitutional Court that the presidential election would have to take place by 7 July 2009. Otherwise parliament would be dissolved and early elections held. The opposition parties stated that they would boycott parliament, citing electoral fraud as the reason, and tried to force new elections. The presidential election was later set for 20 May 2009.

== Aftermath ==
Following the announcement of preliminary election results on 6 April 2009, which showed the Party of Communists of the Republic of Moldova (PCRM) victorious, winning approximately 50% of the votes, the opposition rejected the results, accusing the authorities of falsification in the course of counting the votes and demanded new elections. Opposition and NGO activists organized protest demonstrations in the center of Chişinău on 6 and 7 April.

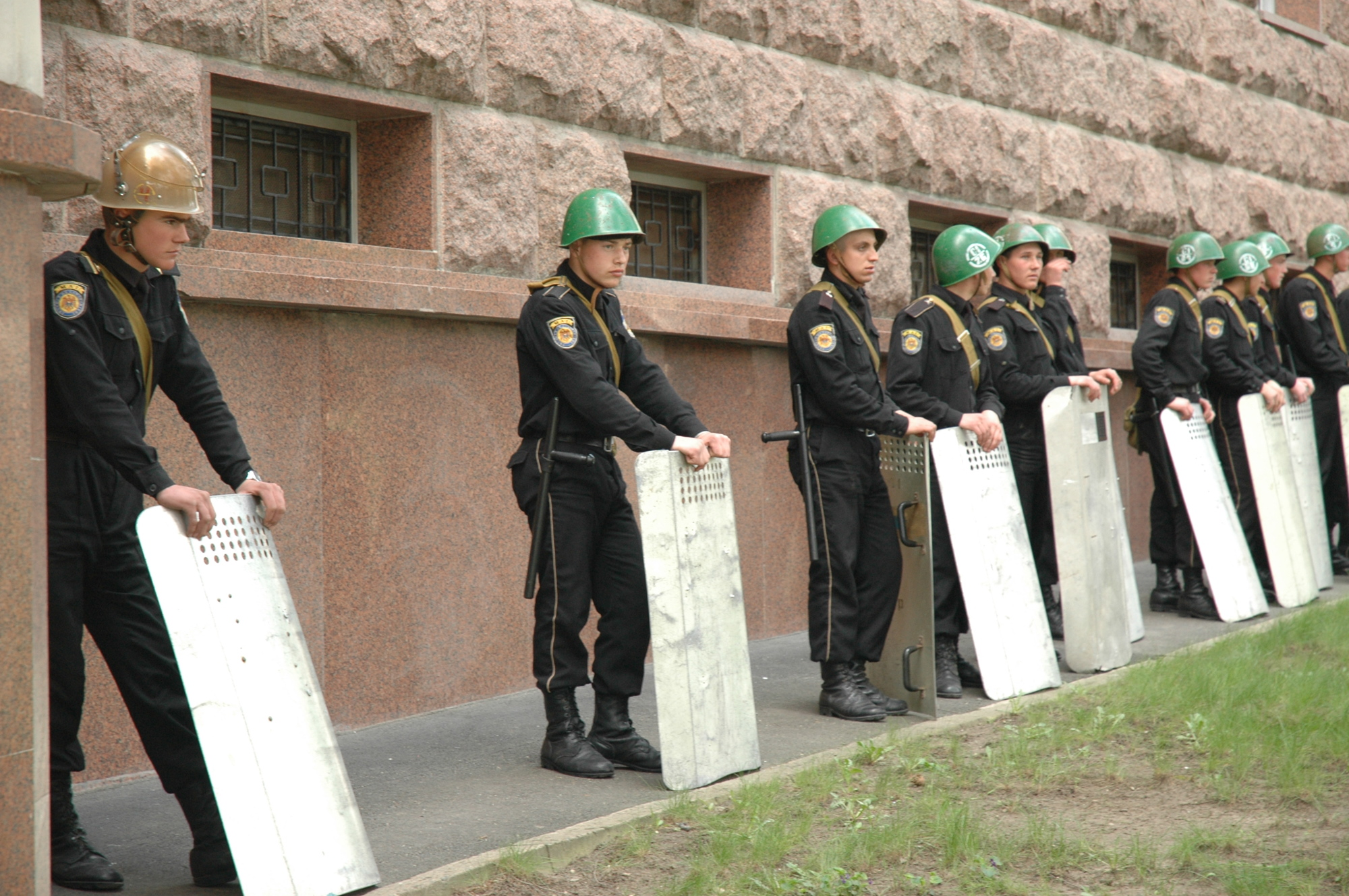
Riot police in Chişinău

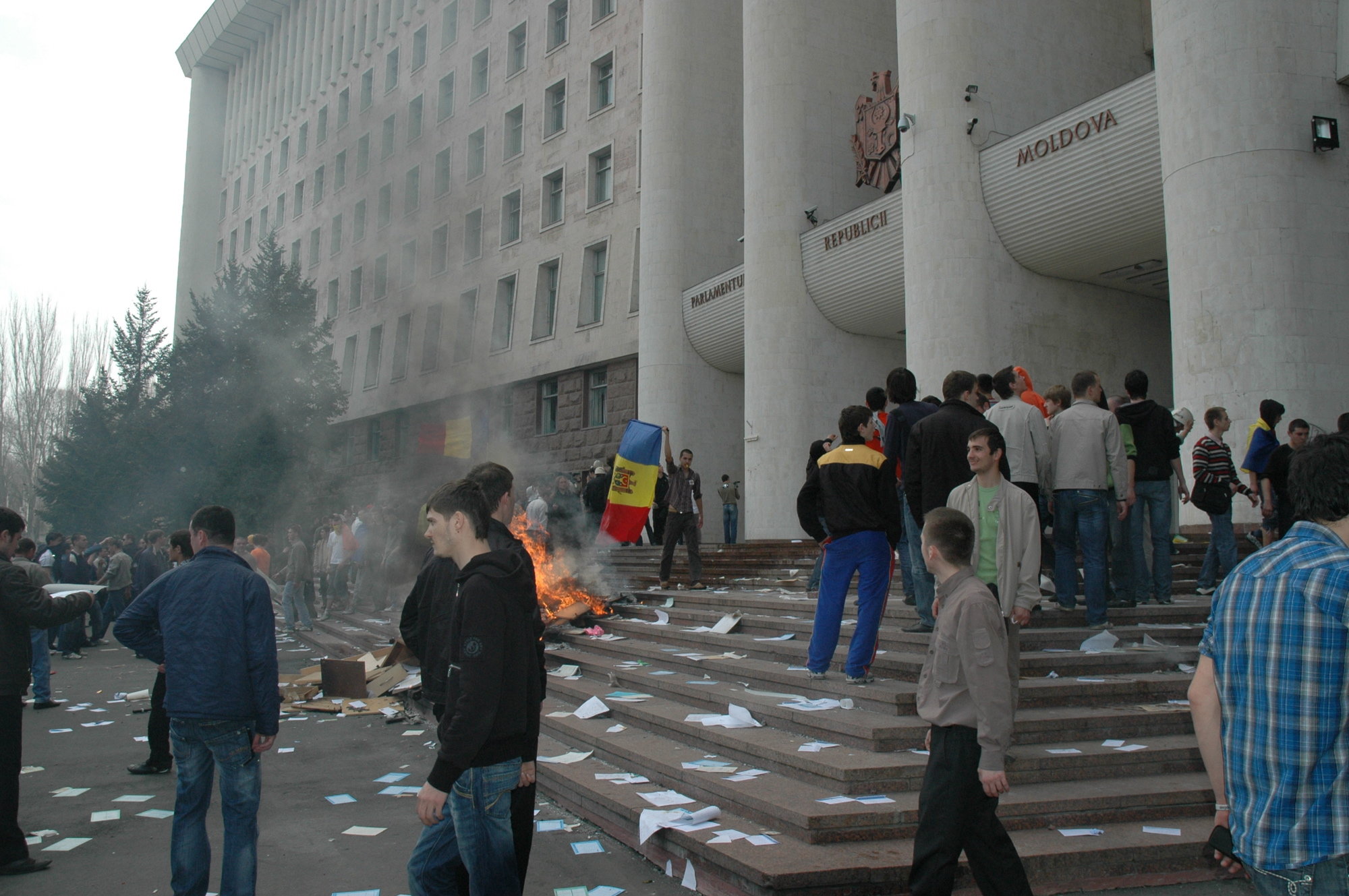
Protest riot in Chişinău (7 April 2009)

The demonstration spun out of control and escalated into a riot on April 7, with protesters attacking the parliament building and the presidential palace, throwing stones at the buildings, with the riot police attempting to protect the buildings. In the afternoon of 7 April the rioters broke into the parliament building, looted it and set it on fire. Police forces had regained control of the city center by 8 April, arresting several hundred protesters. Following the arrests, numerous cases of excessive force usage, including beatings and torture by the police, were reported by the detainees.

Peaceful demonstrations on the central square continued for the remainder of the week. The government and opposition parties have accused each other of sending provocateurs to incite the crowds.

=== Recount ===
On 10 April 2009, Voronin called on the Constitutional Court to authorise a recount of the votes, as demanded by the protesters. On 12 April the court ruled in favor of conducting a recount, which was scheduled to take place on 15 April. On 14 April, Serafim Urechean announced that the three main opposition parties would boycott the recount, citing fears that the government would use it to increase its majority to the 61 seats required to elect the next president.

The results of the recount were published on 21 April. No serious errors were determined and the original election result was confirmed.

=== Election of a new president ===
One of the first tasks of the newly elected parliament is to elect a new president. Incumbent president Vladimir Voronin was ineligible for another term, as he had already served two terms, the maximum number allowed under the constitution. His successor needed to be elected before 8 June 2009 with a three-fifths majority (61 of 101 votes). If no candidate achieved a majority vote before that date, a new parliamentary election would be held. The three opposition parties announced that they would all vote against the PCRM's nominee for president, for which 61 votes out of 101 were required; if Parliament failed to elect a candidate three times, this would result in new parliamentary elections being required.

The Communist Party nominated former Prime Minister Zinaida Greceanîi as their presidential candidate. The previous parliament failed to elect a new president triggering early parliamentary elections which were held on 29 July 2009.

The Parliament had to elect, with a majority of three-fifths the President of Moldova. The ruling Party of Communists of the Republic of Moldova (PCRM) nominated Zinaida Greceanîi, and a puppet-candidate, a Doctor from Chişinău. As the PCRM held only 60 of 101 seats in parliament, but 61 votes were required to elect the president, at least one vote from the opposition was required. The opposition (formed by the three liberal-oriented parties the Liberal Party, the Liberal Democratic Party of Moldova, and the Our Moldova Alliance) boycotted the first round of the election held on 20 May 2009, thus forcing repeated parliamentary elections,. The second round was set for 28 May 2009, but it was postponed to 3 June 2009; the PCRM claimed that it was due to Ascension Thursday falling that day. On 3 June 2009, the second round (repeated election) was held, the results being the same: 60 votes for Zinaida Greceanîi, forcing incumbent Vladimir Voronin to dissolve the Parliament. Early elections were set for 29 July 2009 after Voronin dissolved parliament on 15 June 2009.

== Elected deputies ==
The list of deputies elected in the 5 April 2009 parliamentary elections:

=== Party of Communists of the Republic of Moldova ===
| 1. Vladimir Voronin; 2. Marian Lupu; 3. Zinaida Greceanîi; 4. Victor Mîndru; 5. Mark Tkaciuk; 6. Igor Dodon; 7. Vladimir Vitiuc; 8. Victor Stepaniuc; 9. Eugenia Ostapciuc; 10. Vladimir Eremciuc; 11. Maria Postoico; 12. Ivan Calin; 13. Iuri Eriomin; 14. Galina Balmoş; 15. Anatolie Popuşoi; 16. Anatolie Zagorodnîi; 17. Dmitrii Todoroglo; 18. Iurie Stoicov; 19. Andrei Stratan; 20. Maia Radilov; 21. Vladimir Ţurcan; 22. Veronica Abramciuc; 23. Aliona Babiuc; 24. Elena Bodnarenco; 25. Vadim Mişin; 26. Alla Mironic; 27. Igor Vremea; 28. Iurie Muntean; 29. Vasile Iovv; 30. Grigore Petrenco; 31. Svetlana Rusu; 32. Violeta Ivanov; 33. Lidia Lupu; 34. Raisa Spinovschi; 35. Anton Miron; 36 Irina Vlah; 37. Oleg Reidman; 38. Valeriu Sava; 39. Ludmila Belcencova; 40. Ghenadie Morcov; 41. Oxana Domenti; 42. Anatolie Gorilă; 43. Inna Şupac; 44. Gheorghe Popa; 45. Petru Porcescu; 46. Oleg Garizan; 47. Veaceslav Bondari; 48. Mihail Mocan; 49. Nicolae Munteanu; 50. Mihail Poleanschi; 51. Lidia Semeniţcaia; 52. Sergiu Stati; 53. Mariana Şmilenco; 54. Mihail Rusu; 55. Iurie Moiseev; 56. Oleg Babenco; 57. Serghei Afanasenco; 58. Ala Ursul; 59. Natalia Vîsotina; 60. Ştefan Grigoriev | |
Votes won by PCRM by raion and municipality

=== Liberal Party ===
| 1. Dorin Chirtoacă; 2. Mihai Ghimpu; 3. Anatol Șalaru; 4. Corina Fusu; 5. Vadim Cojocaru; 6. Anatolie Arhire; 7. Gheorghe Brega; 8. Nistor Grozavu; 9. Vadim Vacarciuc; 10. Oleg Bodrug; 11. Ana Guțu; 12. Ion Hadârcă; 13. Valeriu Nemerenco; 14. Mihail Moldovanu; 15. Ion Lupu | |
| 1. Dorin Chirtoacă; 2. Mihai Ghimpu; 3. Anatol Șalaru; 4. Corina Fusu; 5. Vadim Cojocaru; 6. Anatolie Arhire; 7. Gheorghe Brega; 8. Nistor Grozavu; 9. Vadim Vacarciuc; 10. Oleg Bodrug; 11. Ana Guțu; 12. Ion Hadârcă; 13. Valeriu Nemerenco; 14. Mihail Moldovanu; 15. Ion Lupu | Votes won by PL by raion and municipality |

=== Liberal Democratic Party of Moldova ===
| 1. Vladimir Filat; 2. Alexandru Tănase; 3. Liliana Palihovici; 4. Mihai Godea; 5. Vitalie Nagacevschi; 6. Iurie Țap; 7. Călin Vieru; 8. Ion Balan; 9. Vladimir Hotineanu; 10. Iurie Leancă; 11. Alexandru Cimbriciuc; 12. Valeriu Ghilețchi; 13. Simion Furdui; 14. Mihail Șleahtițchi; 15. Angel Agache | |
| 1. Vladimir Filat; 2. Alexandru Tănase; 3. Liliana Palihovici; 4. Mihai Godea; 5. Vitalie Nagacevschi; 6. Iurie Țap; 7. Călin Vieru; 8. Ion Balan; 9. Vladimir Hotineanu; 10. Iurie Leancă; 11. Alexandru Cimbriciuc; 12. Valeriu Ghilețchi; 13. Simion Furdui; 14. Mihail Șleahtițchi; 15. Angel Agache | Votes won by PLDM by raion and municipality |

=== Our Moldova Alliance ===
| 1. Serafim Urechean; 2. Mihai Cimpoi; 3. Veaceslav Untilă; 4. Vasile Balan; 5. Iurie Colesnic; 6. Leonid Bujor; 7. Victor Osipov; 8. Alexandr Oleinic; 9. Valentin Chepteni; 10. Mihail Silistraru; 11. Veaceslav Platon | |
| 1. Serafim Urechean; 2. Mihai Cimpoi; 3. Veaceslav Untilă; 4. Vasile Balan; 5. Iurie Colesnic; 6. Leonid Bujor; 7. Victor Osipov; 8. Alexandr Oleinic; 9. Valentin Chepteni; 10. Mihail Silistraru; 11. Veaceslav Platon | Votes won by AMN by raion and municipality |

== Gallery ==
Voter turnout for the April 2009 election by raion and municipality

Total votes won by the opposition parties (PL, PLDM, AMN) which passed the 6% electoral threshold by raion and municipality
