= Valeriu Munteanu (politician) =

Moldovan politician (born 1980)

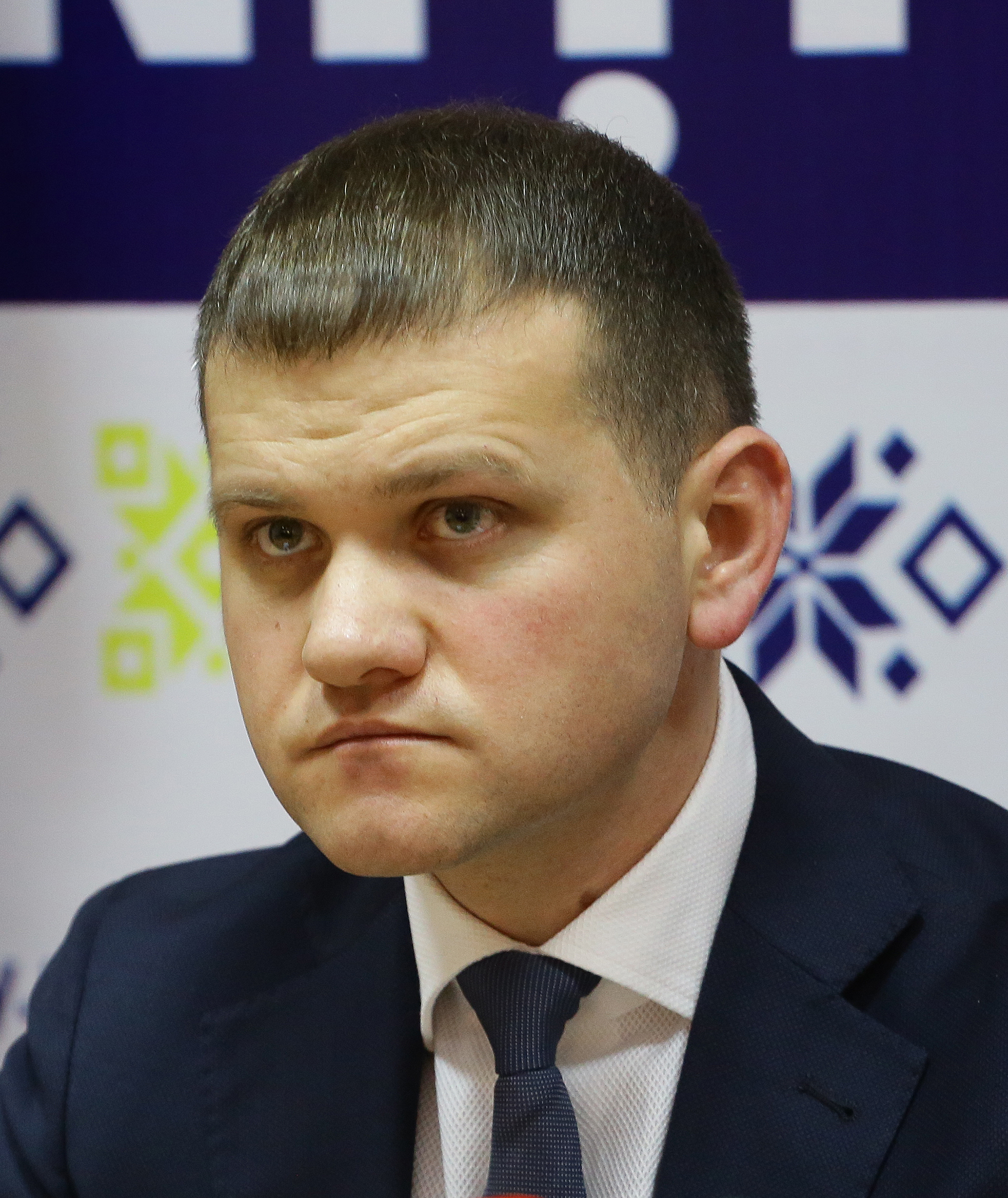
- Munteanu in 2018

Member of the Chamber of Deputies
- Incumbent
- Assumed office 21 December 2024
- Parliamentary group: Alliance for the Union of Romanians

Minister of Environment
- In office 30 July 2015 – 30 May 2017
- President: Nicolae Timofti; Igor Dodon
- Prime Minister: Valeriu Streleț; Gheorghe Brega (acting); Pavel Filip
- Preceded by: Sergiu Palihovici
- Succeeded by: Iuliana Cantaragiu (2021)

Member of the Moldovan Parliament
- In office 3 November 2009 – 30 July 2015
- Preceded by: Dorin Chirtoacă
- Succeeded by: Alina Zotea
- Parliamentary group: Liberal Party

Mayor of Floreni
- In office 3 June 2007 – 3 November 2009

Personal details
- Born: 28 December 1980 (age 45) Floreni, Moldavian SSR, Soviet Union
- Citizenship: Moldova; Romania
- Party: Alliance for the Union of Romanians (in Romania and Moldova) (2021-present)
- Other political affiliations: Liberal Party (2009–2018) Save Bessarabia Union (2019–2021)
- Spouse: Victoria Munteanu
- Children: 4
- Education: Valahia University of Târgoviște
- Profession: Lawyer
- Website: www.munteanu.md

Valeriu Munteanu (born 28 December 1980) is a Moldovan-Romanian politician, who served as Minister of Environment from 2015 to 2017, member of Parliament of Moldova from 2009 to 2015 and mayor of Floreni from 2007 to 2009. He also held the position of Deputy Chairman of the Liberal Party from 2010 to 2018. He has been Chairman of Save Bessarabia Union (USB) 2019—2021. Currently, he is a vice-president of Alliance for the Union of Romanians (AUR). He was elected into the Chamber of Deputies of Romania in 2024, representing AUR.

== Political career ==
In the general local elections on 3 June 2007 he was elected mayor of his hometown, Floreni.

Since 7 February 2008 he has been a member of the Liberal Party; in 2010 he was elected as the party's vice-president. On 11 December 2018 he resigned from Liberal Party.

For the parliamentary elections of 5 April 2009, Valeriu Munteanu was ranked 37th in the list of candidates of the Liberal Party, failing to accede to Parliament. A few months later, at the early parliamentary elections in July 2009, Valeriu Munteanu was ranked 17th on the list of Liberal Party candidates, becoming a member of parliament. It was ranked 5th in the list of candidates of the Liberal Party in the parliamentary elections of 28 November 2010 and 30 November 2014, both time becoming an MP and Vice president of the Liberal Party faction will be Valeriu Munteanu.

In the 19th legislature of the parliament (2010-2014) he was the MP with most parliamentary initiatives — 113 draft normative acts submitted, like declaring Western Christmas Day Official Holiday or draft law proposing Moldova's exit from CIS. During the same period, he had the most speeches and addresses.

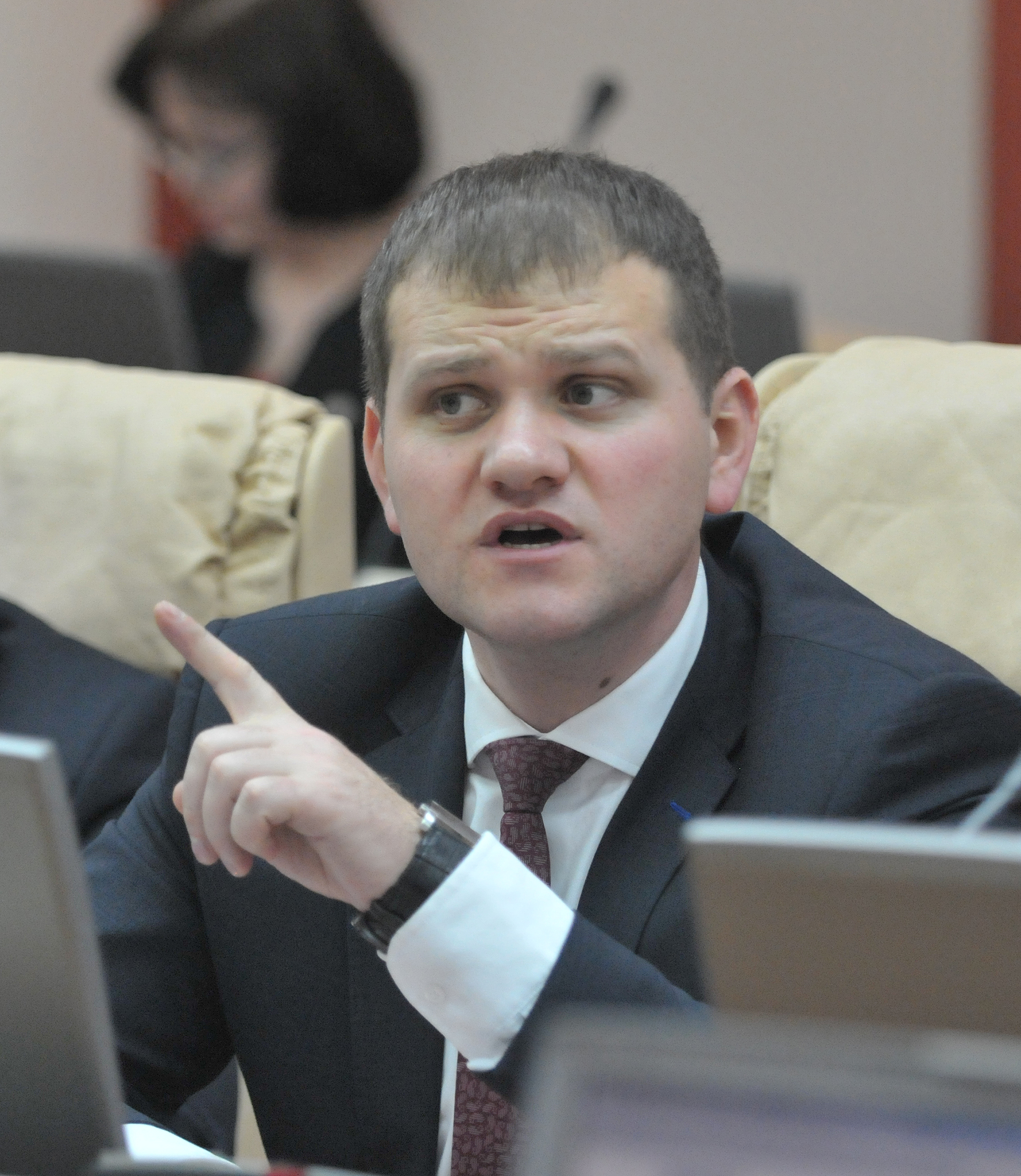
Munteanu during a government meeting in February 2017

On 30 July 2015 he was appointed to the position of the Minister of Environment of the Republic of Moldova in the Streleţ Cabinet and was subsequently reconfirmed in the same position in the Filip Cabinet. On 29 May 2017, he resigned, following the decision of the party to leave the governing coalition.

On 21 July 2019, Munteanu was elected leader of Save Bessarabia Union (USB). In 2020, the USB joined under the leadership of Munteanu the Union Political Movement, a political bloc established for the unification of Moldova and Romania. In November 2021 political party "Save Bessarabia Union" ceased its independent activity and joined the "Alliance for the Union of Romanians".

On 27 March 2022, Valeriu Munteanu was elected as a vice-president of Alliance for the Union of Romanians In the 2024 Romanian parliamentary election on 1 December, Munteanu was elected a member of the Romanian Champer of Deputies for Dâmbovița County, taking office on 21 December of that year.

== Personal life ==
Valeriu Munteanu is married to Victoria Munteanu and has four daughters: Camelia, Ilinca, Smaranda and Crăita, the latter being born in December 2014.

== Awards ==
- Order of the Star of Romania in the grade of Grand Cross;
- Order "Cuviosul Paisie Velicicovscki de gradul II"
