= Moldovan Parliament 2009–2010 =

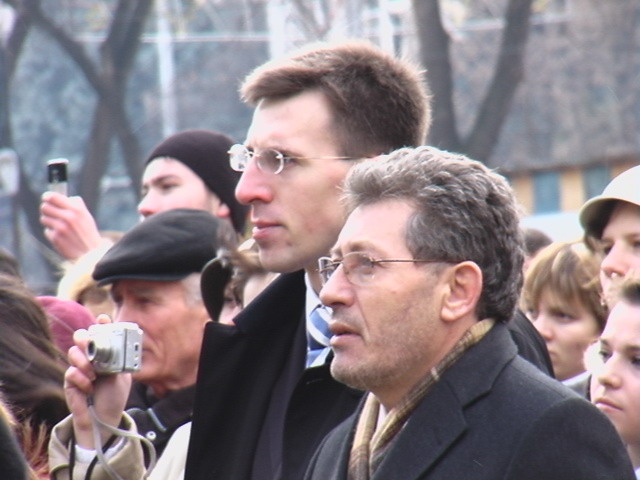
President of the Parliament Mihai Gimpu (2009–2010) at a Romanian-Moldovan unionist rally along with his nephew, former Chișinău mayor Dorin Chirtoacă.

The Parliament of the Republic of Moldova (2009–2010) had 101 seats and was dominated by the Alliance for European Integration (AIE).

Political forces	Seats	Moldovan Parliament seats after July 2009 polls
Alliance for European Integration (right-wing)	53	
Party of Communists (left-wing)	48	
PCRM (48); PLDM (18); PL (15); PDM (13); AMN (7)

== Leadership ==
The first session of Moldova's parliament was scheduled for August 28, 2009, one day short of the deadline for the body to convene. On August 28, 2009, the Alliance for European Integration (AIE) elected Mihai Ghimpu as the Speaker of the Moldovan Parliament.

== The elected deputies ==
For an updated list of deputies elected in July 2009, please see July 2009 Moldovan parliamentary election.
