= 2005 Chișinău mayoral election =

Elections for the post of mayor of Chișinău were held on 10 July, 24 July, 27 November, and 11 December 2005.

== July Election ==
Elections for the post of mayor of Chișinău on 10 July 2005 have been declared invalid, as they participated in only 27% of voters. The by-election on 24 July 2005 was attended by only 19,8% of voters. These elections were also declared invalid because of the participation of less than one-third of voters on the electoral lists.

== November–December Election ==
Following elections were held on 27 November 2005. 22,42% of the voters was not enough to recognize the election. Another attempt to elect the mayor of the capital was made on 11 December 2005. At this time the polls were 22.62% of the inhabitants of Chişinău. The mayor was not elected. From 2005 to 2007 mayor was Vasile Ursu. On 25 January 2007 Vasile Ursu was appointed Minister of Transport and acting mayor of Chișinău became Veaceslav Iordan, former deputy of Ursu.

== Results ==
The election of mayor of Chișinău
Candidate / Party	10 July		24 July		27 November		11 December	
Candidate / Party	Votes	%	Votes	%	Votes	%	Votes	%
Dumitru Braghiș, Independent Candidate	32 126	20,65%						
Vladimir Braga, Ecologist Party of Moldova "Green Alliance"	599	0,39%						
Iuliana Gorea-Costin, Independent Candidate	7 699	4,95%						
Zinaida Greceanîi, (Party of Communists)	78 018	50,15%	96 250	87,78%				
Vladimir Guritsenko, Democratic Party of Moldova	2 925	1,88%						
Dorin Chirtoacă, Liberal Party	11 091	7,13%			32 098	25,14%	45 299	35,62%
Valeri Klimenko, Blocul Electoral Patria - Rodina	5 848	3,76%	13 400	12,22%				
Valentin Krilov, Blocul Electoral Patria - Rodina					8 151	6,38%	8 803	6,92%
Eduard Mușuc Social Democratic Party (Moldova)					5 991	4,69%		
Olga Nikolenko, Social Liberal Party (Moldova)					2 276	1,78%		
Mircea Rusu, Party Alliance Our Moldova					13 096	10,26%		
Mihai Severovan, Independent Candidate	5 574	3,58%						
Gheorghe Sima, Labor Union "Patria-Rodina"	783	0,5%			1 521	1,19%	1 324	1,04%
Gheorghe Susarenco, Christian-Democratic People's Party	10 914	7.02%						
Vasile Ursu, Independent Candidate					59 570	46,66%	67 279	52,91%
Oleg Cernei, Ecologist Party of Moldova "Green Alliance"					4 970	3,89%	4 462	3,51%
