= Moldovan parliamentary election, 2009 =

Moldovan parliamentary election, 2009 can refer to two elections:

- April 2009 Moldovan parliamentary election
- July 2009 Moldovan parliamentary election
