= Ana Guțu =

Moldovan politician

Ana Guțu OR
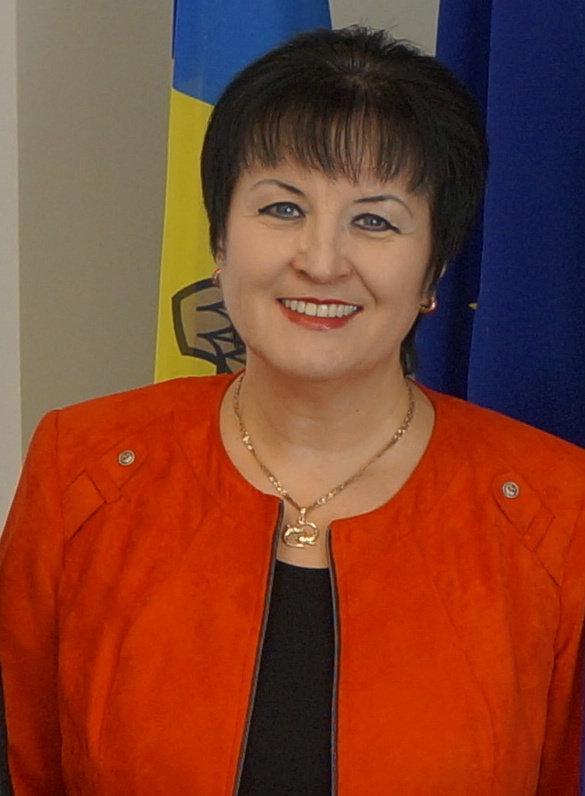
- Guțu in 2014

Member of the Moldovan Parliament
- In office 22 April 2009 – 9 December 2014
- Parliamentary group: Liberal Party; Liberal Reformist Party

Personal details
- Born: 13 March 1962 (age 64) Alexandru Ioan Cuza, Moldavian SSR, Soviet Union
- Citizenship: Moldova; Romania
- Party: National Unity Party
- Other political affiliations: Liberal Party; Liberal Reformist Party
- Children: 2
- Education: Moldova State University
- Profession: Professor

Ana Guțu (born 13 March 1962) is a Moldovan politician, who served as Member of the Parliament of Moldova from 2009 to 2014.

== Biography ==
Ana Guțu was born on 13 March 1962 in the village of Alexandru Ioan Cuza, Cahul, Cahul District in the family of Romanian language and history teachers Valentina Petrov-Sârghi and Pavel Petrov. In 1979 she graduated secondary school No.2 with gold medal, currently Bogdan Petriceicu Hasdeu high school in Cahul. In 1984 she graduated the Faculty of Foreign Languages with special mention, the French language and literature specialty, the State University of Moldova (USM), in 1985-1990 the Doctorate at the USM, the Department of French Philology. The theme of the doctoral thesis is "The systemic and functional aspect of the antonyms (based on French literary works)", under the scientific wand of the doctor habilitat professor Grigore Cincilei.

== Political activity ==
Guțu has been a member of the Parliament of Moldova since May 2009 until 2014 during the XVII, XVIII and XIXth legislatures. She was elected in April 2009 election and July 2009 election.

She has been a member of the Parliamentary Assembly of the Council of Europe since 28 September 2009. From October 2009 until June 2011 he was the head of the Delegation of the Parliament of the Republic of Moldova to the Parliamentary Assembly of the Council of Europe (PACE), and from May 2011 the head of the Delegation of the Moldovan Parliament to the Parliamentary Assembly of the Francophonie. From 22 January 2013, she is Deputy Chairman of the PACE Commission for the Regulation, Immunities and Institutional Affairs, in 2014 becomes the Chair of the Committee on Culture, Education, Research and Media, PACE, and from May 2013 until 2014 was Chairman of the Parliamentary Commission for Foreign Policy and European integration.

Since June 2013, Ana Gutu is the vice-president of the PACE Alliance of Liberals and Democrats.

In January 2013, the political crisis related to the hunting in the Princely Forest broke out, where Sorin Paciu was shot. As a result of this crisis, the Second Filat Cabinet falls, and PL leader Mihai Ghimpu refuses to vote for a new pro-European government on the eve of the Eastern Partnership Summit in Vilnius, Lithuania, where Moldova was to sign the Association Agreement with the EU. 7 deputies from the Liberal Party split out of the 12 and vote for the pro-European government headed by Iurie Leanca. They are expelled from the Liberal Party and later founded the Liberal Reformist Party.

== Awards ==
- Professor Magna cum Laudae al ULIM, 1999;
- Ordinul ULIM 2002,
- Ordinul "Gloria Muncii", 2002;
- Medalia "ULIM - 15 ani de ascensiune", 2007.
- Order Star of Romania, 2014
- Ordinul Republicii, 2014
