= Democracy at Home Party =

Moldovan political party

Democracy at Home Party Partidul Democrația Acasă
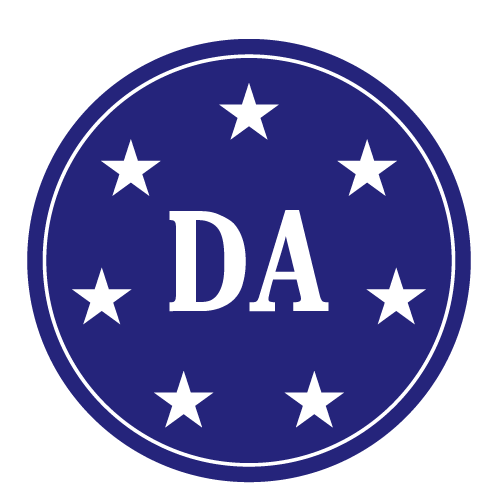
- Abbreviation: PPDA
- President: Vasile Costiuc
- Founded: 31 July 2011
- Headquarters: 59 București Street, Chișinău
- Membership (2025): 6,450
- Ideology: Right-wing populism Moldovan–Romanian unionism Pro-Europeanism
- Political position: Right-wing
- National affiliation: Union Political Movement (2020–2021)
- European affiliation: European Conservatives and Reformists Party (intention to join)
- Colours: Dark blue
- Parliament: 6 / 101
- District Presidents: 0 / 32

Website
- https://pda.md/

The Democracy at Home Party (Romanian: Partidul Democrația Acasă) or Democracy at Home Political Party (Partidul Politic Democrația Acasă; PPDA) is a right-wing populist and unionist party in the Republic of Moldova.

== History ==
The Democracy at Home Party was established on 31 July 2011, but it was officially registered on 2 September. It is the legal successor of the "Democracy at Home" Youth Movement (Mișcarea de Tineret "Democrația Acasă"). Its president is Vasile Costiuc. It is a unionist party, supporting the unification of Moldova and Romania, and was defined by Deutsche Welle as right-wing populist.

The party participated in the 2019 Moldovan parliamentary election, obtaining the 11th place with a total of 4,463 (0.32%) votes. This represented an increase of 0.17% from the 2014 Moldovan parliamentary election, but this was not enough to exceed the minimum of 6% of the votes to enter the Parliament of Moldova. Its slogan during this election was #FărăFoști.

The PPDA was part of the Union Political Movement (MPU), a political bloc established on 15 January 2020 to unite Moldova with Romania together with four other Moldovan political parties. At the time of its establishment, Costiuc declared that this was the first step towards "the constitution of a large movement, with national support" and that its aim was "to stop the expansionism of the Russian Empire". The MPU participated in the 2020 Moldovan presidential election through its candidate Dorin Chirtoacă. However, on 30 April 2021, the PPDA left the coalition composing the MPU as Costiuc considered the trajectories and objectives of both were not the same.

In the 2025 Moldovan parliamentary election, the party received 5.62% of the votes and won 6 seats. Moldovan NewsMaker journalist Ecaterina Dubasova described the PPDA's result as the election's main surprise, as polls gave the party 2–3% of the votes at most, below the 5% electoral threshold for entering the parliament. Costiuc was the first on the party's list of candidates, being followed by manager Sergiu Stefanco, international relations specialist Ana Țurcan Oboroc, philologist Valentina Meșină, lawyer Alexandru Chițu and politologist Alexandru Verșinin, who all also entered parliament.

After the 2025 parliamentary election, the ruling Party of Action and Solidarity (PAS) filed a complaint to the Central Electoral Commission (CEC) regarding irregularities during the PPDA's campaign, including support from the Romanian opposition politician George Simion. Consequently, the party was sanctioned over accused violations of the electoral code, receiving a warning and having its state funding removed for a year. The CEC left it to the Constitutional Court to approve the party's six gained seats, this having referred to validating the seats of all the parties that surpassed the electoral threshold, with the CEC never having requested the annulment of the PPDA's seats specifically. On 9 October, the party's sanction regarding state funding was lifted, and on 16 October, the Court validated the parliamentary election, including the party's six seats.

== Positions ==
As a Moldovan–Romanian unionist conservative party, it has been backed by the AUR in Romania, whose leader called on Moldovans to support the party at the 2025 elections. On 22 October that year, the day of the session to establish the new legislature of the parliament, Costiuc stated that "we declare ourselves pro-European opposition, to the pro-European government".

The party's position on relations with Europe and Russia is ambiguous. While it was part of the pro-European Union Political Movement, it has been reported that party leader Vasile Costiuc has attended an event in Moscow organised by Aleksandr Kondyakov, a former advisor to Vladimir Putin. Journalist Sorin Ozon alleged that Kondyakov had been an agent of the KGB.

The party has declared its intention to join the European Conservatives and Reformists Party.

== Election results ==
=== Parliamentary elections ===
Parliament
Election	Leader	Performance					Rank	Government
Election	Leader	Votes	%	± pp	Seats	+/–	Rank	Government
2014	Vasile Costiuc	2,449	0.15%	New	0 / 101	New	16th	Extra-parliamentary
2019	Vasile Costiuc	4,463	0.32%	▲0.17	0 / 101	Steady	9th	Extra-parliamentary
2021	Vasile Costiuc	21,255	1.45%	▲1.13	0 / 101	Steady	7th	Extra-parliamentary
2025	Vasile Costiuc	88,679	5.62%	▲4.17	6 / 101	▲6	5th	Opposition
