= Ion Apostol =

Moldovan politician (born 1962)

Member of the Moldovan Parliament
- In office 9 December 2014 – 9 March 2019
- Parliamentary group: Liberal Party
- In office 16 March 2010 – 24 December 2010
- Preceded by: Ion Lupu
- Parliamentary group: Liberal Party

Personal details
- Born: 21 August 1962 (age 63) Văratic, Moldavian SSR, Soviet Union
- Party: Liberal Party; Alliance for European Integration (2009–present)

Ion Apostol (born 21 August 1962) is a politician from the Republic of Moldova, deputy in parliament since 2010.

== Biography ==
Ion Apostol was born on August 21, 1962, is a foreign languages teacher and director of "OPTIMAL Impex" SRL. In the parliamentary elections in 2009 he was on the list of candidates from the Liberal Party with number 19.
