= Union Political Movement =

Unionist political bloc in Moldova

Union Political Movement Mișcarea Politică Unirea
- Abbreviation: MPU
- Founded: 15 January 2020
- Dissolved: 13 May 2021
- Headquarters: Chișinău
- Ideology: Moldovan–Romanian unionism Atlanticism; Pro-Europeanism
- Political position: Right-wing
- Member parties: Democracy at Home Party (until April 2021); Liberal Party; National Liberal Party; Romanian Popular Party; Save Bessarabia Union
- Colours: Blue
- Slogan: Unirea pentru toți! ([the] Union for everyone!)
- Parliament: 0 / 101
- District Presidents: 0 / 32

The Union Political Movement (Romanian: Mișcarea Politică Unirea; MPU) was a unionist (pro-unification with Romania) political bloc in Moldova. It was founded on 15 January 2020 at the initiative of five parties to join forces to fight for the unionist cause. The bloc participated in the 2020 Moldovan presidential election with its candidate, Dorin Chirtoacă, finishing last after receiving 1.2% of the votes.

The bloc's members were the Democracy at Home Party (PPDA; left in April 2021), the Liberal Party (PL), the National Liberal Party (PNL), the Romanian Popular Party (PPR) and the Save Bessarabia Union (USB). On 13 May 2021, the MPU suspended its activity until after the 2021 Moldovan parliamentary election after disagreements over participation in the election.

== History ==
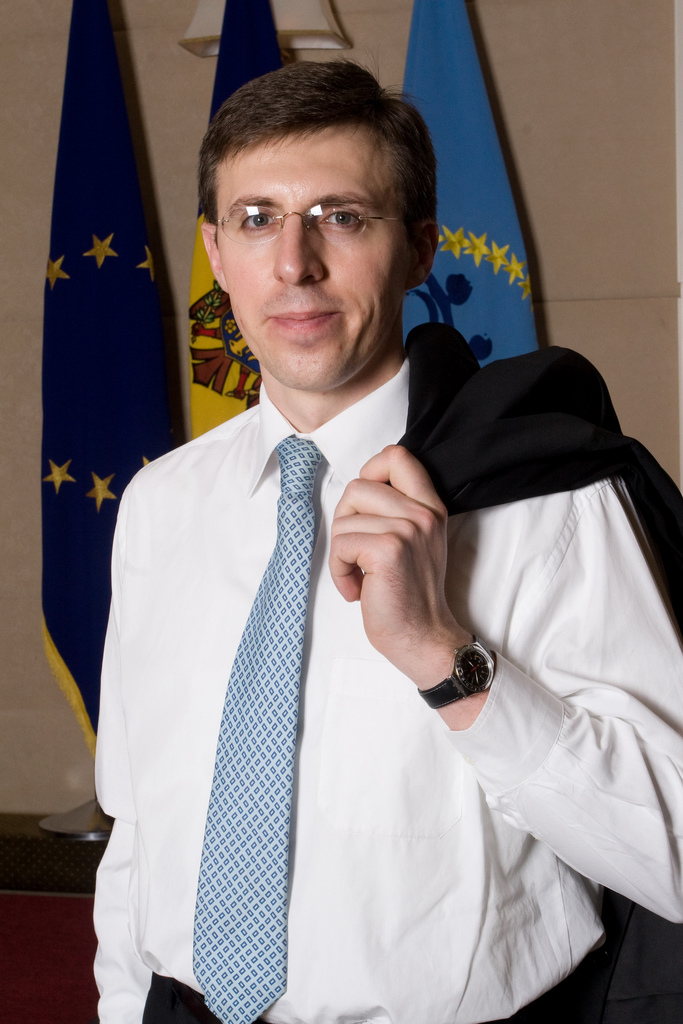
Dorin Chirtoacă, the candidate of the Union Political Movement for the 2020 Moldovan presidential election

On 15 January 2020, the Union Political Movement (MPU) was established by five political parties: the Liberal Party (PL), the National Liberal Party (PNL), the Romanian Popular Party (PPR), the Democracy at Home Party (PPDA) and the Save Bessarabia Union (USB). The agreement by which its creation was agreed was signed by the leaders of the five parties in front of the Bust of Mihai Eminescu in the Alley of Classics in Chișinău, the Moldovan capital. This was done in celebration of the 170th anniversary of the birth of the famous Romanian poet Mihai Eminescu. The parties pledged to participate jointly under the format of the new political bloc in the upcoming parliamentary, local and presidential elections in Moldova.

Vasile Costiuc, the president of the PPDA, said that this was the first step towards "the constitution of a large movement, with national support" and that its aim was "to stop the expansionism of the Russian Empire". For his part, Dorin Chirtoacă, head of the PL, said that this was the movement that had been awaited for 30 years and expressed his desire to see Moldova within the European Union, NATO and as part of a Greater Romania. PPR leader Tatiana Potîng mentioned that this movement was a response "to the demands of society that the syndicalist [unionist] forces unite" and that they chose 15 January for Eminescu to "not only to be our witness, but also to mark the supreme instance of this act". Valeriu Munteanu, the captain of the USB, said that "the only chance for a better life for the citizens is to repair a serious historical error by reuniting Bessarabia with Romania", which as he said, was something "complicated but inevitable". Finally, Ion Calmac, president of the PNL, said that "we urge other political forces to make mature decisions and to join our movement".

On 23 May, the MPU demanded the resignation of the Prime Minister Ion Chicu and the removal of his Romanian citizenship. This was due to a Facebook fight between Chicu and the Romanian MEP Siegfried Mureșan in which he called Romania "the most corrupt country in Europe". Other Moldovan political figures also voiced opposition to Chicu's comments, and he eventually apologized.

On 3 June, the MPU proposed the National Unity Party (PUN), one of the few other openly unionist parties of Moldova, to join the bloc and propose a single candidate for the 2020 Moldovan presidential election. In reply to this, the PUN stated that the proposal would be analyzed and considered and a "reasoned response" would be given when considered appropriate. However, Octavian Țîcu, president of the PUN, later said that he would not dialogue with the MPU to realize the proposal.

On 29 June, the MPU officially adopted a resolution by which Chirtoacă was designed as the bloc's candidate for the 2020 presidential elections. Other Moldovan unionist parties were encouraged again to join the bloc. A month later, on 29 August, it was announced that the MPU had submitted the necessary documents to the Central Election Commission of Moldova (CEC) to be registered and be able to run in the elections. On 5 October, the CEC declared that it had registered both the MPU and the PUN to participate in the presidential elections, setting the number of candidates to eight in total (Chirtoacă for the MPU and Țîcu for the PUN).

On 7 October, Chirtoacă presented the bloc's official slogan, Unirea pentru toți! ("[the] Union for everyone!"). Four other secondary slogans were also featured: Cu România în Europa ("With Romania in Europe"), Unirea și punctum ("Union and period"), În Europa prin Unire ("In Europe through the Union") and Europa până la capăt ("Europe to the end").

During the presidential elections, Chirtoacă only received 16,145 votes (1.2% of the total), finishing last of the eight candidates and receiving fewer votes than the signatures he had submitted for participation.

On 30 April 2021, the PPDA left the MPU, with Costiuc declaring that he considered the trajectories and objectives of the PPDA and the MPU were not the same. On 13 May, the MPU suspended its activity until after the snap parliamentary election that year after disagreements regarding the participation of the bloc and of its member parties in the election.

== See also ==
- Politics of Moldova
