= Nemerenco =

Nemerenco is a Moldovan surname. Notable people with the surname include:

- Ala Nemerenco (born 1959), Moldovan politician
- Nicolae Nemerenco (born 1992), Moldovan footballer
- Valeriu Nemerenco (born 1959), Moldovan politician
