= Save Bessarabia Union =

Save Bessarabia Union Uniunea Salvați Basarabia
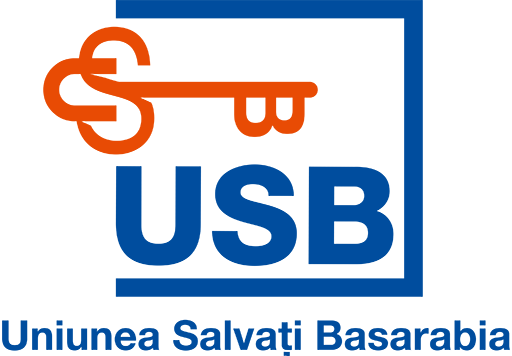
- Abbreviation: USB
- President: Valeriu Munteanu
- Secretary: Ilie Crețu
- Founded: October 22, 2006
- Dissolved: 2021
- Merged into: AUR Moldova
- Headquarters: Chișinău, Moldova
- Ideology: Conservatism; Moldovan–Romanian unionism Christian democracy
- National affiliation: Union Political Movement (2020–2021)
- Colours: Blue

Save Bessarabia Union (Romanian: Uniunea Salvați Basarabia, USB), previously known as European Action Movement is a political party from Moldova. The party supports the unification of Moldova and Romania. On 21 July 2019, the party changed its name from European Action Movement to Save Bessarabia Union and elected Valeriu Munteanu as its new president.

== Overview ==
The party was formed at the first congress on October 22, 2006. The first president was Anatol Petrencu (October 22, 2006 – January 24, 2010). It merged into the Liberal Party (PL) in March, 2011. Valeriu Munteanu has been the president of the party since July 21, 2019. According to its statute, Save Bessarabia Union's main political objective focuses on the Unification of Moldova and Romania. USB's doctrine will be based on three fundamental pillars:

- identity (ethno-linguistic affiliation to the Romanian Nation);
- family (traditional family);
- allegiance (Christian orthodox allegiance).

The USB was one of the founding parties of the Union Political Movement (MPU), a political bloc established for the unification of Moldova and Romania.

== Notable former members ==
- Anatol Petrencu
- Veaceslav Untilă
- Iurie Colesnic

== Electoral results ==
=== Legislative elections ===
Year	Votes	%	Seats	+/−	Government
2009 (April)	15,481	1.00	0 / 101	Steady	Extra-parliamentary opposition
2010	21,049	1.22	0 / 101	Steady	Extra-parliamentary opposition
2014	Did not contest		0 / 101	Steady	Extra-parliamentary opposition
2019	Did not contest		0 / 101	Steady	Extra-parliamentary opposition
2021	with PL, PPR, and AUR		0 / 101	Steady	Extra-parliamentary opposition

== Bibliography ==
- (in Romanian) Statutul MAE
- (in Romanian) Echipa şi platforma electorală
