= Vadim Vacarciuc =

Moldovan weightlifter (born 1972)

Personal information
- Born: October 1, 1972 (age 53)
Medal record
Men's Weightlifting
Representing Moldova
World Championships
| Bronze medal – third place | 1995 Guangzhou | – 83 kg |
| Bronze medal – third place | 2003 Vancouver | – 94 kg |
European Championships
| Silver medal – second place | 2000 Sofia | – 94 kg |
| Bronze medal – third place | 1994 Sokolov | – 83 kg |

Vadim Vacarciuc (born 1 October 1972) is a retired weightlifter from Moldova. He competed in four consecutive Summer Olympics for his native Eastern European country, starting in 1996.

Vacarciuc is best known for winning the silver medal in the men's light-heavyweight division (– 94 kg) at the 2000 European Weightlifting Championships in Sofia, Bulgaria. He twice carried the flag for Moldova at the opening ceremony of the Summer Olympics: in 1996 and 2000.

== Political activity ==
Vacarciuc is a member of the Liberal Party of Moldova. In April 2009 polls, he became one of the party's MPs and in the July 2009 polls, he was re-elected. He joined the Liberal Party Reform Council in 2013.

== Arrest ==
On 5 June 2024, Vacarciuc was arrested in La Crosse, Wisconsin, United States, on charges of unauthorized use of another person's identification or document.
