= Pădurea Domnească case =

2013 scandal in Moldova

The Pădurea Domnească case took place on 23 December 2012 in Moldova when Sorin Paciu, a young businessman, was fatally wounded while hunting at the Pădurea Domnească ("Princely Forest") reserve together with several high-ranking Moldovan government officials. These included Prosecutor General Valeriu Zubco, President of the Chișinău Court of Appeals Ion Pleșca, vice-president of the latter Gheorghe Crețu and Moldsilva state-owned company director Ion Lupu.

All present officials hid the incident, which became public on 13 January 2013 following statements by Moldovan politician Sergiu Mocanu, leader of the Antimafia Popular Movement. The case caused the resignation of Zubco and later the collapse of the ruling coalition Alliance for European Integration and the resignation of the Second Filat Cabinet. Gheorghe Crețu was the only person found guilty in the case.
