= Stop Media Ban =

- Established: 2023
- Legal status: Public association
- Headquarters: Chișinău, MD
- Board of directors: Ludmila Belcencova

Stop Media Ban is a Moldovan public association of journalists and media workers established in 2023 to combat media repression and advocate for press freedom in Moldova and beyond. The organization was founded in response to widespread media censorship, including the closure of 13 TV channels, 2 radio stations, and over 100 online media outlets. Stop Media Ban works to defend democracy, human rights, and freedom of expression by promoting transparent and effective media protection mechanisms both locally and internationally.

== History ==
Stop Media Ban was founded in Chișinău, Moldova, in 2023 amid a crackdown on independent media following a change in political power. The association emerged as a response to the suspension of licenses for several TV channels and radio stations, as well as the blocking of numerous online platforms. The government cited national security concerns and disinformation as reasons for these actions, but critics argue that the measures lacked transparency and due process.

At the association's launch, Ludmila Belcencova, President of Stop Media Ban, highlighted the challenges faced by journalists not aligned with the government. She stated that opposition journalists were systematically excluded from government meetings and round tables, while progovernment media figures were favored. Belcencova emphasized that such practices undermined press freedom and created a discriminatory environment for independent journalism.

== Activities ==
Stop Media Ban has organized several high-profile initiatives to draw attention to media repression in Moldova.

On March 21, 2023, a group of independent journalists from Stop Media Ban protested in front of the European Parliament in Brussels, calling for an end to media bans in Moldova.

On May 3, 2024 (World Press Freedom Day), the association launched a European petition urging the Moldovan government to reverse its hostile policies toward press freedom and recommit to defending it as a fundamental human right.

The association has actively engaged with international organizations, including the European Union, OSCE, and Reporters Without Borders, to highlight the deteriorating state of press freedom in Moldova. These efforts have brought global attention to the issue and prompted criticism of the Moldovan government's actions.

== Context of Media Repression in Moldova ==
Since 2022, the Moldovan government has suspended the licenses of multiple TV channels and blocked access to numerous websites, often citing national security concerns and disinformation. These measures were implemented under a state of emergency declared in response to Russia's invasion of Ukraine. Critics argue that the government's actions lack transparency and judicial oversight, raising concerns about their proportionality and compliance with international human rights standards.

Stop Media Ban's efforts have been supported by international organizations and watchdogs, including:

- Reporters Without Borders: RWB has criticized the lack of transparency in the suspension of TV channels and the rapid legislative changes aimed at blocking media outlets.
- OSCE: The OSCE Office for Democratic Institutions and Human Rights condemned the restrictions on freedom of speech, which do not appear proportionate to the violations committed under international human rights law.

In a 2024 interview with opposition journalist Yury Dud, Moldovan President Maia Sandu acknowledged that media bans were carried out without judicial review. When questioned about the use of undemocratic methods to defend democratic values, Sandu did not provide a clear justification, further fueling criticism of the government's approach to press freedom.

== See also ==
- Freedom of the press
- Media of Moldova
