= Bărboieni =

- Village
- Location in Moldova
- Coordinates: 47°01′N 28°03′E
- Country: Moldova
- District: Nisporeni District

Population (2014 census)
  - Total: 815
- Time zone: UTC+2 (EET)
  - Summer (DST): UTC+3 (EEST)

Bărboieni is a village in Nisporeni District, Moldova.

== Notable people ==
- Vadim Cojocaru
