= Romanian Popular Party =

Romanian Popular Party Partidul Popular Românesc
- Abbreviation: PPR
- President: Vlad Țurcanu
- Founder: Ion Hadârcă
- Founded: 12 April 2013
- Headquarters: Chişinău, Moldova
- Membership (2014): 25,000
- Ideology: Liberalism; Moldovan-Romanian unionism
- Political position: Centre-right
- National affiliation: Union Political Movement (2020–2021)
- International affiliation: Liberal International (observer)
- Colours: yellow, blue, red

The Romanian Popular Party (Romanian: Partidul Popular Românesc, PPR), previously known as the Liberal Reformist Party (Romanian: Partidul Liberal Reformator), is a political party from Moldova. The party supports the unification of Moldova and Romania. On 27 August 2019, the party changed its name from Liberal Reformist Party to Romanian Popular Party and elected Vlad Țurcanu as its new president at the second Congress of the party.

== Overview ==
Logo of the PPR when it was known as the "Liberal Reformist Party"

Formed on 12 April 2013, as the Liberal Party Reform Council (CRPL) and a pro-government faction within the Liberal Party (PL), calling for reform of the party. The first president of the party was Ion Hadârcă from 2013 until 2019. Its seven MPs were subsequently ejected from the Liberal Party and agreed to enter a new coalition, called the Pro-European Coalition, with the Liberal Democratic Party of Moldova (PLDM) and the Democratic Party of Moldova (PDM) on 30 May 2013.

On 21 June 2013, at Costești, Ialoveni took place General Meeting of the Liberal Party Reform Council, which adopted a decision to create a new political party with a liberal doctrine.

On 1 August 2013, in Chişinău took place the first meeting of the Council of Founding of the Liberal Reformist Party (PLR).

Its seven MPs were former Liberal Party (PL) deputy chairman Ion Hadârcă, former Liberal Party secretary-general Oleg Bodrug, Ana Guțu, Anatol Arhire, Vadim Vacarciuc, Vadim Cojocaru, and Valeriu Saharneanu. The party failed to gain representation at the 2014 parliamentary election.

Vlad Țurcanu has been the president of the party since 27 August 2019.

The PPR was one of the founding parties of the Union Political Movement (MPU), a political bloc established for the unification of Moldova and Romania.

== Notable former members ==
- Ion Hadârcă
- Oleg Bodrug
- Ana Guțu
- Anatol Arhire
- Vadim Vacarciuc
- Valeriu Saharneanu
- Vadim Cojocaru

== Electoral results ==
=== Legislative elections ===
Year	Votes	%	Seats	+/−	Government
2014	24,956	1.56	0 / 101	Steady	Extra-parliamentary opposition
2019	Did not contest		0 / 101	Steady	Extra-parliamentary opposition
2021	with PL, USB, and AUR		0 / 101	Steady	Extra-parliamentary opposition
