= Vasile Costiuc =

Moldovan politician (born 1981)

Vasile Costiuc MP
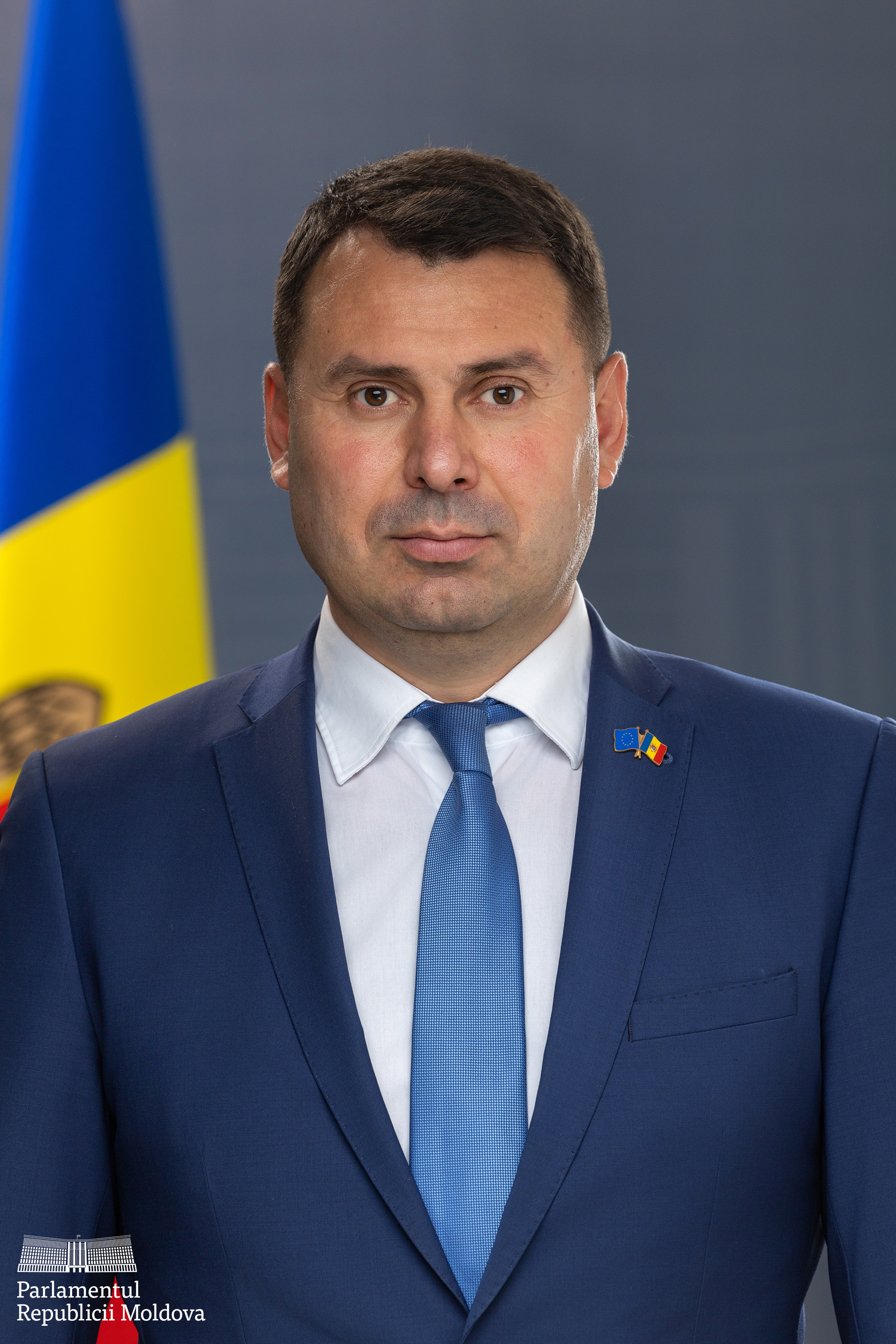
- Official portrait, 2025

Member of the Moldovan Parliament
- Incumbent
- Assumed office 22 October 2025
- Parliamentary group: Democracy at Home Party

President of the Democracy at Home Party
- Incumbent
- Assumed office 31 July 2011
- Preceded by: Party established

Personal details
- Born: 25 May 1981 (age 45) Sadaclia, Moldavian SSR, Soviet Union
- Citizenship: Moldova; Romania
- Party: PPDA (since 2011)
- Other political affiliations: PL (2004–2007); AMN (2007–2009); AUR (2024)
- Education: Ion Creangă State Pedagogical University of Chișinău
- Occupation: Journalist, politician

Vasile Costiuc (born 25 May 1981) is a Moldovan politician, former journalist and leader of the Democracy at Home Party.

== Biography ==
He studied at the Ion Creangă State Pedagogical University of Chișinău. He declares himself a history and geography professor, though he was in fact a reporter for Jurnal de Chișinău between 2008 and 2010.

He was once a member of the youth wing of the Liberal Party, which he separated from in 2010 to found the 'Democracy at Home' youth movement. The movement transformed into a political party in 2011.

In 2024 he participated in the parliamentary elections (in the Chamber of Deputies) of Romania on the lists of the Alliance for the Union of Romanians in the Diaspora constituency, but he was not elected.

Democracy at Home found success in the 2025 parliamentary elections, when the party won 5.62% of the vote, translating into 6 seats.
