= Svetlana Popa =

Moldovan politician

Member of the Moldovan Parliament
- In office 28 August 2009 – 28 December 2010
- Parliamentary group: Party of Communists

Personal details
- Born: 24 March 1964 (age 62)
- Other political affiliations: Party of Communists of the Republic of Moldova

Svetlana Popa (born 24 March 1964) is a Moldovan politician.

== Biography ==
Svetlana Popa served as the leader of the communist faction in the Chişinău Municipal Council. She has been a member of the Parliament of Moldova since 2009. On March 17, 2010, Svetlana Popa left the Party of Communists of the Republic of Moldova.
