= Boris Vieru =

Moldovan politician (1957–2019)

Boris Vieru OR

Member of the Moldovan Parliament
- In office 14 August 2009 – 9 December 2014
- Parliamentary group: Liberal Party

Personal details
- Born: 2 July 1957 Braniște, Moldavian SSR, Soviet Union
- Died: 20 February 2019 (aged 61) Chișinău, Moldova
- Party: Liberal Party; Alliance for European Integration (2009–2019)
- Education: Moldova State University
- Profession: Journalist

Boris Vieru (2 July 1957 – 20 February 2019) was a Moldovan politician.

He worked for Literatura şi Arta (1988–1990). In 1998, Boris Vieru founded Chişinău office of the Radio Free Europe station. He had been a member of the Parliament of Moldova since 2009 until 2014.
