= Lidia Lupu =

Moldovan politician (1953–2021)

Member of the Moldovan Parliament
- In office 9 December 2014 – 9 March 2019
- Parliamentary group: Party of Socialists; Democratic Party

Personal details
- Born: 19 May 1953
- Died: 13 November 2021 (aged 68)
- Party: PSRM

Lidia Lupu (19 May 1953 – 13 November 2021) was a Moldovan politician. A member of the Party of Socialists of the Republic of Moldova, she served in the Parliament of the Republic of Moldova from 2014 to 2019. In 2003, she was awarded the Meritul Civic medal.
