= Communist Reformers Party of Moldova =

Communist Party in Moldova

Communist Reformers Party of Moldova Partidul Comunist Reformator din Moldova
- Abbreviation: PCR
- President: Ruslan Popa
- Founder: Ruslan Popa
- Founded: May 3, 2014
- Dissolved: April 2015
- Ideology: Communism
- Political position: Left-wing
- Slogan: Împotriva tuturor care au fost la guvernare! lit. 'Against all who have been in government!'

The Communist Reformers Party of Moldova (in Romania: Partidul Comunist Reformator din Moldova, PCR; in Russian: Коммунистическая Партия Реформаторов Молдовы) was a communist party in Moldova. PCR was founded on 3 May 2014 by Ruslan Popa. Observers meant that the creation of the PCR had the only purpose to weaken the Party of Communists of the Republic of Moldova (PCRM) in the parliamentary elections of 30 November 2014. The PCR received 4.92% of the votes, but no seats.

The PCR had been registered by the Ministry of Justice in May 2014 but after a court decision in April 2015 the PCR was deregistered.
