= 2014 Moldovan parliamentary election =

- 30 November 2014
- All 101 seats in Parliament; 51 seats needed for a majority
- Turnout: 55.79% (▼5.85pp)
Party	Leader	Vote %	Seats	+/–
PSRM	Igor Dodon	20.51	25	+21
PLDM	Vlad Filat	20.16	23	−9
PCRM	Vladimir Voronin	17.48	21	−17
PDM	Marian Lupu	15.80	19	+4
PL	Mihai Ghimpu	9.67	13	+1
This lists parties that won seats. See the complete results below.
Most voted-for party by district
Prime Minister before	Prime Minister
Iurie Leancă; PLDM	Chiril Gaburici; PLDM
Cabinet before	Cabinet after
Leancă Cabinet; PLDM–PDM–PLR	Gaburici Cabinet; PLDM–PDM

Parliamentary elections were held in Moldova on 30 November 2014. The result was described as "more a loss than a victory" of the incumbent pro-European coalition, with center-right parties divided by sharp tensions. The pro-Russian Party of Socialists (PSRM), composed of former communists, emerged as the largest party in Parliament, gaining 20.51% of votes and winning 25 of the 101 seats. The Party of Communists of the Republic of Moldova (PCRM), previously the largest party, dropped from 38 to 21 seats.

== Electoral system ==
The 101 members of Parliament were elected by party-list proportional representation in a single nationwide constituency. There were four separate electoral thresholds: 11% for electoral blocs with three or more parties, 9% for two-party electoral blocs, 6% for single parties or organisations, and 2% for independent candidates; the thresholds for parties and coalitions had been increased since the previous elections, having previously been 9% for coalitions of three or more parties, 7% for coalitions of two parties and 4% for parties running alone.

Documents for registration of electoral candidates had to be submitted to the Central Electoral Commission (CEC) between 3 and 30 October 2014. Once formally registered by the CEC, the candidates were allowed to begin campaigning.

Voter turnout had to be over 33 percent for the election to be validated.

== Parties and coalitions ==
Below is a list of the main parties and electoral blocs which contested the election:

Party	Lead candidate	Main ideology	Last election		Government
Party	Lead candidate	Main ideology	Vote %	Seats	Government
PCRM	Vladimir Voronin	Communism	39.3%	42	Opposition
PLDM	Vlad Filat	Liberal conservatism	29.4%	32	Coalition government
PDM	Marian Lupu	Social Democracy	12.7%	15	Coalition government
PL	Mihai Ghimpu	Conservative liberalism	10.0%	12	Opposition
PSRM	Zinaida Greceanîi	Democratic socialism Social conservatism	Did not contest		Opposition

== Campaign ==
A total of 41 parties registered at the Ministry of Justice by the 15 September deadline, but the final ballot included 19 parties, one bloc, and four independent candidates.

The main dividing line between the parties was foreign policy, setting the pro-European Union (EU) parties (the Democratic Party, the Liberal Democratic Party, and the Liberal Party) against those supporting rapprochement with the then incoming Eurasian Economic Union and the Russian Federation (PCRM and PSRM). The PSRM was the most radical by offering to cancel the agreement on political association and the free trade zone with the EU, and was openly supported by Russia. The leader of the party, Igor Dodon, publicly met with Russian President Vladimir Putin and Deputy Prime Minister Dmitry Rogozin.

=== Participating ===
In total, the Central Electoral Commission registered 25 participants in the election (20 political parties, 1 electoral bloc, and 4 independent candidates):

No.	Party or independent candidate's name	Candidate list accepted by the Central Electoral Commission on
1	Democratic Party of Moldova	10 October 2014
2	Christian-Democratic People's Party	10 October 2014
3	Force of the People Party	10 October 2014
4	Liberal Democratic Party of Moldova	10 October 2014
5	Liberal Reformist Party	10 October 2014
6	Communist Reformist Party of Moldova	10 October 2014
7	Popular Movement Anti-Mafia Party	10 October 2014
8	National Liberal Party	10 October 2014
9	Party of Socialists of the Republic of Moldova	10 October 2014
10	'Moldova’s Choice — the Customs Union' Electoral Bloc	10 October 2014
11	Democracy at Home Party	10 October 2014
12	People's Party of Moldova	10 October 2014
13	Party of Communists of the Republic of Moldova	10 October 2014
14	Liberal Party	10 October 2014
15	Revival Party	10 October 2014
16	Homeland Party (Note: Declared withdrawn on 27 November 2014. However, its name appeared on the ballot paper, as it was too late to remove it.)	13 October 2014
17	Democratic Action Party	27 October 2014
18	Ecologist Green Party	28 October 2014
19	Equality Movement (Note: On 22 November 2014, the CEC announced that it had accepted the party's decision to withdraw from the election.)	29 October 2014
20	Oleg Cernei	29 October 2014
21	Oleg Brega	3 November 2014
22	'Patriots of Moldova' Party	3 November 2014
23	Valeriu Pleșca	6 November 2014
24	Anatolie Doga	7 November 2014
25	Centrist Union of Moldova	6 November 2014
26	For the Nation and Country Party	6 November 2014

=== Withdrawn ===
The candidate list of the Republican Socio-Political Movement Equality was accepted by the Central Electoral Commission (CEC) on 29 October 2014; however, the party later decided to withdraw from the election. On 22 November 2014, the CEC announced that it had accepted the withdrawal.

The Homeland Party was declared withdrawn from the election by the Chișinău Court of Appeal on 27 November 2014, for having used foreign financial resources during the campaign. Because ballot papers had already been printed, it was too late to remove the party's name (as was previously done for the Socio-political Movement 'Ravnopravie'). Instead, a stamp marked "withdrawn" was applied next to the party's name. The Supreme Court of Justice of Moldova rejected the party's appeal on 29 November 2014.

== Opinion polls ==
Party	2010 elections		Opinion Polls												
Party	Seats	%	Jan 2013	Apr 2013	Apr 2013	May 2013	Oct 2013	Nov 2013	Nov 2013	March 2014	April 2014	May 2014	June 2014	July 2014	September 2014
PCRM	42	39.32	31.8	50.2	41.8	53.9	39.3	49.6	50.8	48.7	44.5	41.7	36.6	36.2	35.6
PLDM	32	29.42	26.5	19.5	24.7	17.4	16.9	19.7	19.1	28.3	26.5	19.2	23.9	26.1	28.3
PDM	15	12.7	11.9	10.5	13.9	11.9	10.2	13.2	12.7	12.8	14.6	10.2	13.8	14.5	16.2
PL	12	9.96	14.8	16.2	10.4	10.3	7.1	8.8	11.1	10.2	14.3	8.9	10.1	11.6	9.6
PSRM	—	—	1.5	0.9	4.7	2.0	4.9	0.9	0.6	—	—	8.3	1.8	4.3	—
PLR	new	—	—	—	—	—	2.6	2.5	1.6	—	—	0.9	5.9	—	—
MPA	new	—	—	—	—	—	—	—	1.8	—	—	2.8	—	2.9	—
PPCD	0	0.53	—	0.3	—	0.9	—	1.3	—	—	—	1.2	—	—	—
PSD	0	0.59	—	0.8	—	0.3	—	—	1.2	—	—	—	—	—	—
PAD	new	—	—	—	—	0.5	—	—	—	—	—	—	—	—	—
PPM	new	—	—	—	—	—	—	—	—	—	—	1.3	—	—	—
PaRuS	new	—	—	—	—	—	—	—	—	—	—	—	—	—	10.2

== Results ==
Results of the election, showing vote strength by commune.

Party	Votes	%	Seats	+/–
Party of Socialists	327,912	20.51	25	+21
Liberal Democratic Party	322,201	20.16	23	–9
Party of Communists	279,366	17.48	21	–17
Democratic Party	252,489	15.80	19	+4
Liberal Party	154,518	9.67	13	+1
Communist Reformist Party	78,716	4.92	0	New
'Moldova's Choice – Customs Union' (PRM–PSD–MPUV)	55,089	3.45	0	New
Popular Movement Anti-Mafia Party	27,846	1.74	0	New
Liberal Reformist Party	24,956	1.56	0	New
People's Party	12,110	0.76	0	New
Christian-Democratic People's Party	11,782	0.74	0	0
Force of the People Party	11,665	0.73	0	New
National Liberal Party	6,858	0.43	0	0
Revival Party	4,158	0.26	0	New
Democratic Action Party	2,564	0.16	0	New
Democracy at Home Party	2,449	0.15	0	New
For the Nation and Country Party	1,697	0.11	0	0
Patriots of Moldova	1,498	0.09	0	0
Ecologist Green Party	1,360	0.09	0	0
Centrist Union	633	0.04	0	New
Independents	18,651	1.17	0	0
Total	1,598,518	100.00	101	0
Valid votes	1,598,518	96.92		
Invalid/blank votes	50,884	3.08		
Total votes	1,649,402	100.00		
Registered voters/turnout	2,956,270	55.79		
Source: CEC
