= Ocnița, Ocnița =

Ocnița
- Commune
- Location within Moldova
- Coordinates: 48.3853°N 27.4392°E
- Country: Moldova
- District: Ocnița District

Population (2014)
  - Total: 3,133
- Time zone: UTC+2 (EET)
  - Summer (DST): UTC+3 (EEST)
- Postal code: MD-7130

Ocnița is a commune in Ocnița District, Moldova. It is composed of two villages, Maiovca and Ocnița.

== Gallery ==
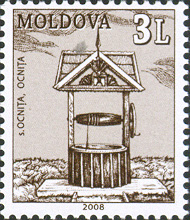
