= Ion Hadârcă =

Moldovan politician

Ion Hadârcă OR
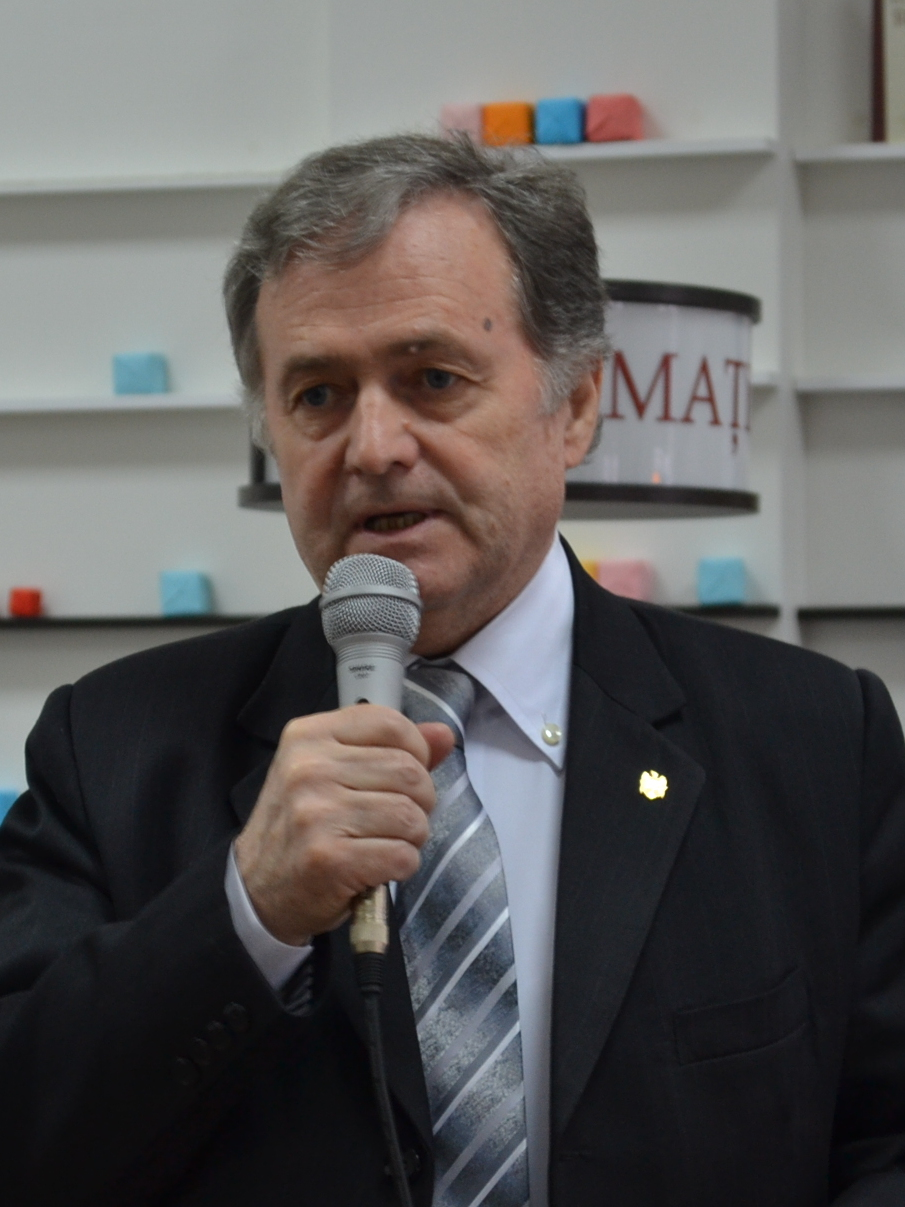
- Hadârcă in 2014

Member of the Senate of Romania
- In office 21 December 2016 – 21 December 2020
- Parliamentary group: Alliance of Liberals and Democrats
- Constituency: Vaslui

Member of the Moldovan Parliament
- In office 22 April 2009 – 9 December 2014
- Parliamentary group: Liberal Party; Liberal Reformist Party
- In office 17 April 1990 – 22 March 1998
- Parliamentary group: Popular Front
- Constituency: Lazo

First Vice President of the Moldovan Parliament
- In office 27 August 1991 – 2 February 1993
- President: Mircea Snegur
- Prime Minister: Valeriu Muravschi; Andrei Sangheli
- Speaker: Alexandru Moșanu

People's Deputy of the Soviet Union
- In office 26 March 1989 – 17 April 1990
- Constituency: Călărași

Personal details
- Born: 17 August 1949 (age 76) Sîngerei, Moldavian SSR, Soviet Union
- Party: Liberal Party Reform Council
- Other political affiliations: Communist Party of the Soviet Union; Popular Front of Moldova; Liberal Party
- Profession: Writer

Ion Hadârcă (born 17 August 1949) is a poet, translator and Moldovan politician, deputy to the Parliament of the Republic of Moldova between 1990 and 1998 and from 2009 to 2014. Ion Hadârcă was the founder and first president of the Popular Front of Moldova (1989–1992), chairman of the Liberal Reformist Party.

== Biography ==
Ion Hadârcă was born on 17 July 1949 in Sîngerei, Sîngerei District. Between 1968 and 1970, he carried out the compulsory military service in the Soviet army. He was the first president of the Popular Front of Moldova (1989–1992). He was elected as president during the second congress of the Front (30 June – 1 July 1989) from among 3 candidates for the job; other two candidates that sought election to the post were Nicolae Costin and Gheorghe Ghimpu.

Ion Hadârcă was member of the Supreme Soviet (1989–1990) and the Moldovan Parliament (1990–1998). Hadârcă was an MP of the Liberal Party until he joined the Liberal Party Reform Council in 2013.

=== Political activity ===
In 1974 he became a CPSU member. Since 1988, poet Ion Hadârcă is committed to the national liberation movement, to awaken the conscience of the Bessarabian Romanians. In 1989, he is elected as a deputy of the people in the URSS Parliament. In 1990, he is elected again as deputy in the Parliament of the Republic of Moldova in his first democratic parliamentary term and holds the position of first deputy chairman of Parliament.

On 28 January 1993, the President of the Parliament of the Republic of Moldova, Alexandru Moșanu, Vice-President Ion Hadârcă, the Chairman of the Mass Media Commission Valeriu Matei and the President of the Foreign Relations Commission Vasile Nedelciuc surprisingly presented their resignation, motivating their gesture the desire to prevent public opinion "on the danger of full restoration of the totalitarian regime in the Republic of Moldova".

In 1994, Ion Hadârcă is re-elected to the Parliament of the Republic of Moldova. Between 1 January 1996 and 22 June 1998, he was an alternate member of the Republic of Moldova delegation to the Parliamentary Assembly of the Council of Europe.

In 1998–2008 he did not participate in political activity. From 2008 to 2010 he is vice-president, and from 2010 until 2013 he is the first vice-president of the Liberal Party. In 2009 he became a deputy in the parliament on the lists of the Liberal Party and chairman of the parliamentary faction of LP.

On 12 April 2013 Ion Hadârcă together with 30 members of the Liberal Party (LP) met in the Council of the Liberal Reformist Party (CLRP), demanding replacing Mihai Ghimpu with Dorin Chirtoacă at the head of the LP. The next day the Republican Council of the Liberal Party expelled Ion Hadârcă from the ranks of the party, along with four other liberal-reforming deputies.

As chairman of the PL parliamentary faction, he has participated in the negotiations on the majority pro-European training in Parliament and on 30 May 2013 he signed the agreement for the establishment of the Pro-European Governance Coalition.

On 15 December 2013 Ion Hadârcă, at the Constitutional Congress of the Liberal Reformist Party, was elected as a chairman of the party.

== Family ==
He is married to Maria and has two children: Ionela and Eugen. In addition to Romanian, Ion Hadârcă also speaks English and Russian.
