= Vadim Cojocaru =

Moldovan politician (1961–2021)

Member of the Moldovan Parliament
- In office 22 April 2009 – 9 December 2014
- Parliamentary group: Liberal Party; Liberal Reformist Party

Personal details
- Born: May 19, 1961 Barboieni, Moldavian SSR, Soviet Union
- Died: June 7, 2021 (aged 60) Chișinău, Moldova
- Party: Liberal Party; Alliance for European Integration (2009–2013)
- Education: Moldova State University

Vadim Cojocaru (19 May 1961 – 7 June 2021) was a Moldovan politician.

== Biography ==
Vadim Cojocaru graduated from Moldova State University in 1982, faculty Economics of Trade and Merceology, qualification - economist. Between 1989 and 1990 he graduated from the State University of Kyiv. He got his PhD in 1992.

He was a member of the Parliament of Moldova since 2009 till 2014. He joined the Liberal Party Reform Council in 2013.

Cojocaru died on 7 June 2021, aged 60.

== Courses (internships) ==
- 1988: Institute of Commerce of Kyiv (Ukraine), Department of Trade Organization.
- November 1991: Russian Academy of Management (Moscow), "Mechanisms of functioning of the market economy".
- May - June 1992: "Market Economy Management and Marketing", ELKEPA Greece, Athens.
- April 1993: "Al.I.Cuza" University of Iași (Romania), "International Marketing".
- June - July 1995: University of Omaha, Nebraska, United States. "Business Administration".
- March 2002, January 2005: Pierre Mendes University, "University Management and Marketing" Grenoble, France.

== Professional activity ==
- 1982-1991: assistant at the department "Economics, organization and management of commerce", State University of Moldova.
- 1991-1993: lecturer at "Marketing" Chair, senior lecturer at "General Management" Chair, AESM.
- 1993-1994: Associate Professor at "Economics and Management" Chair, Commercial Cooperative University of Moldova.
- Since 1994: Associate Professor, University Professor at the "General Management" Chair, AESM.
