= Mihail Mocan =

Moldovan politician (1962–2026)

Member of the Moldovan Parliament
- In office 24 March 2005 – 5 May 2009
- Parliamentary group: Party of Communists

Personal details
- Born: 10 August 1962
- Died: 3 July 2026 (aged 63)
- Party: PCRM
- Occupation: Political scientist

Mihail Mocan (10 August 1962 – 3 July 2026) was a Moldovan politician. A member of the Party of Communists of the Republic of Moldova, he served in the Parliament from 2005 to 2009.

Mocan died on 3 July 2026, at the age of 63.
