= Stella Jantuan =

Moldovan politician (born 1966)

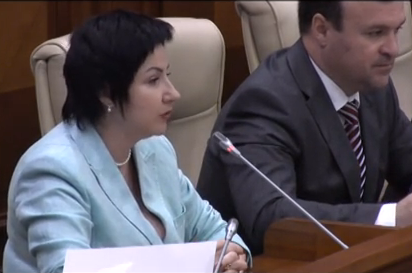
- Jantuan in 2014

Political Issues, Relations with Public Authorities and Civil Society Advisor to the President
- Incumbent
- Assumed office 10 January 2023
- President: Maia Sandu

Member of the Moldovan Parliament
- In office 14 August 2009 – 9 December 2014
- Parliamentary group: Democratic Party

Personal details
- Born: 13 September 1966 (age 59) Bălți, Moldavian SSR, Soviet Union
- Party: Democratic Party
- Education: Moldova State University; University of Bucharest

Stella Jantuan (born 13 September 1966) is a Moldovan politician.

Jantuan served as Chief of Unit of the Information and Analysis Department, Parliament of the Republic of Moldova.

She has been a member of the Parliament of Moldova from 2009 to 2014.
