= Anatol Arhire =

Moldovan politician (born 1956)

Member of the Moldovan Parliament
- In office 4 December 2012 – 9 December 2014
- Preceded by: Valeriu Nemerenco
- Parliamentary group: Liberal Party; Liberal Reformist Party
- In office 22 April 2009 – 24 December 2010
- Parliamentary group: Liberal Party

Personal details
- Born: 20 July 1956 (age 69) Ungheni, Moldavian SSR, Soviet Union
- Party: Liberal Party; Alliance for European Integration (2009–present)

Anatol Arhire (born 20 July 1956) is a Moldovan politician, deputy in the Parliament of Moldova since 2009.

== Studies ==
- 1977-1982: Agricultural State University of Moldova, Chișinău, specialty Hydrotechnic Engineer

== Professional activity ==
- From July 2007 to 5 April 2009: Vice-President of Ungheni District, responsible for Agriculture, Infrastructure, Land and Cadastre
- From 5 April 2009: deputy in the Parliament of the Republic of Moldova, Member of the Agriculture and Food Industry Commission
