= Iurie Colesnic =

Moldovan politician (born 1955)

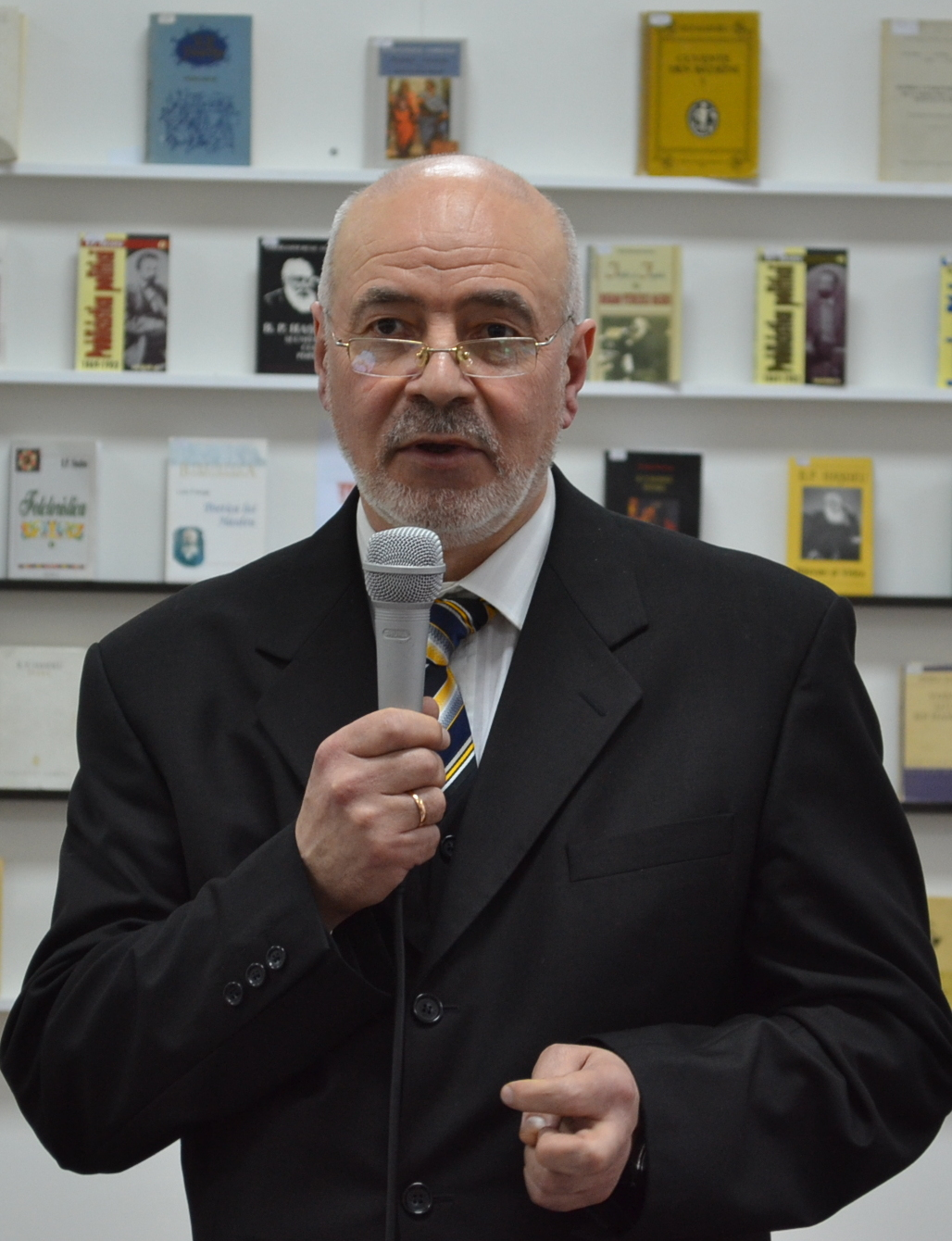
- Colesnic in 2014

Member of the Moldovan Parliament
- In office 5 May 2009 – 28 December 2010
- Parliamentary group: Our Moldova Alliance; European Action Movement

Personal details
- Born: 12 August 1955 (age 70) Dereneu, Moldavian SSR, Soviet Union
- Party: European Action Movement
- Other political affiliations: Alliance Our Moldova; Alliance for European Integration (2009–present)

Iurie Colesnic (born 12 August 1955) is a technical literature corrector, former publishing director, literary historian, politician and writer of the Republic of Moldova.

== Biography ==
Iurie Colesnic was born on 12 August 1955 in the village of Dereneu, Calarasi district, in a family of teachers. He was a Komsomol member (1969-1983). He graduated from the faculty of energy at the Technical University of Moldova in 1978.

Iurie Colesnic has been a member of the Parliament of Moldova since 2009 and has been a member of the European Action Movement since 2010. Before Colesnic had been a member of the Party Alliance Our Moldova.

== Works ==
- Binecuvântare, 1989
- Buburuza, 1991
- Harap Alb (în colaborare), 1991
- Filozofii din Cubolta, 1997

== Awards ==
- Medalia Sfântul Daniil (2000).
- Membru - Correspondent al Academiei Internaţionale de Cadre (Kiev, 2000).
- Doctor „Honoris Cauza” al Universităţii Umaniste (Chişinău, 2000)

== Bibliography ==
- Tudor Ţopa.Condamnaţi la zbucium. Chişinău. Ed. Universul. 2003, pp. 224
- Petru Soltan (colectiv). Calendar Naţional.
- Tudor Ţopa. Voievozii inspiraţiei. Chişinău. 2007.
