= Simion Furdui =

Moldovan politician (born 1963)

Member of the Moldovan Parliament
- In office 5 May 2009 – 9 December 2014
- Parliamentary group: Liberal Democratic Party

Personal details
- Born: 9 July 1963 (age 62) Vărăncău, Moldavian SSR, Soviet Union
- Party: Liberal Democratic Party; Alliance for European Integration (2009–present)

Simion Furdui (born 9 July 1963) is a Moldovan politician former member of the Moldovan Parliament.

He has been a member of the Parliament of Moldova since 2009 until 2014.
