= Ion Lupu =

Moldovan politician (born 1963)

Member of the Moldovan Parliament
- In office 22 April 2009 – 5 March 2010
- Succeeded by: Ion Apostol
- Parliamentary group: Liberal Party

Personal details
- Born: Vărzărești, Moldavian SSR, Soviet Union
- Party: Liberal Party; Alliance for European Integration (2009–present)

Ion Lupu (born 25 January 1963) is a Moldovan politician, former parliamentarian, member of the Alliance for European Integration. He also acted as director of state-owned "Moldsilva" and "Apele Moldovei".

== Biography ==
Prior to being elected to the Parliament of the Republic of Moldova, Ion Lupu was the Minister of Youth and Sports in 2009.
