= Oleg Reidman =

Moldovan politician (born 1952)

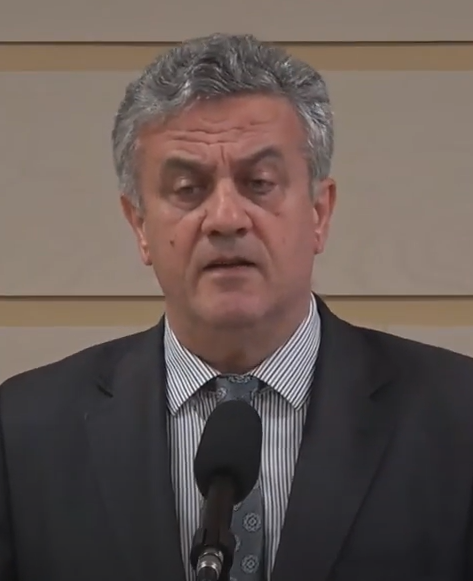
- Reidman in 2016

Member of the Moldovan Parliament
- In office 23 July 2021 – 16 October 2025
- Parliamentary group: Bloc of Communists and Socialists
- In office 22 April 2009 – 9 March 2019
- Parliamentary group: Party of Communists
- In office 6 March 2005 – 22 April 2005
- Succeeded by: Gheorghe Musteață
- Parliamentary group: Party of Communists

Economic Advisor to the President
- In office 12 June 2002 – 22 April 2009
- President: Vladimir Voronin
- Preceded by: Sergiu Pușcuța
- Succeeded by: Victor Sula

Personal details
- Born: 18 May 1952 (age 74) Chișinău, Moldavian SSR, Soviet Union
- Citizenship: Soviet Union (until 1991); Moldova (after 1991)
- Party: Communist Party of the Soviet Union (1972-1991); Party of Communists of the Republic of Moldova (1993-present)
- Education: Voronezh State University
- Profession: Radiophysicist
- Awards: Order of Work Merit

Oleg Reidman (Russian: Олег Моисеевич Рейдман; born 21 May 1952) is a Moldovan politician, who served in the Parliament of the Republic of Moldova.

== Biography ==
He is one of the leaders of the Party of Communists of the Republic of Moldova. He is a close acquaintance of the ex-Moldovan President, Vladimir Voronin.

== Personal life ==
Reidman is of Russian-Jewish descent.
