= Ludmila Belcencova =

Moldovan politician (born 1972)

Member of the Moldovan Parliament
- In office 22 April 2009 – 28 December 2010
- Parliamentary group: Party of Communists

Personal details
- Party: United Moldova Party
- Other political affiliations: Party of Communists of the Republic of Moldova

Ludmila Belcencova is a Moldovan politician.

She has been a member of the Parliament of Moldova since 2009.

She is the president of the public association Stop Media Ban since 2023.
