= Iurie Țap =

Moldovan politician (born 1955)

Member of the Moldovan Parliament
- In office 22 April 2009 – 9 March 2019
- Parliamentary group: Liberal Democratic Party

Vice President of the Moldovan Parliament
- In office 10 September 2009 – 24 December 2010 Serving with: Marcel Răducan; Alexandr Stoianoglo
- President: Vladimir Voronin; Mihai Ghimpu (acting)
- Prime Minister: Zinaida Greceanîi; Vitalie Pîrlog (acting); Vladimir Filat
- Speaker: Mihai Ghimpu
- Preceded by: Grigore Petrenco
- Succeeded by: Liliana Palihovici

Mayor of Florești
- In office 9 July 1999 – 22 April 2009
- Succeeded by: Grigore Cojocaru

Personal details
- Born: 3 October 1955 (age 71) Nimereuca, Moldavian SSR, Soviet Union
- Party: Liberal Democratic Party; Alliance for European Integration (2009–present)
- Children: 4
- Education: Moldova State University

Iurie Țap (born 3 October 1955) is a Moldovan politician.

He has been a member of the Parliament of Moldova since 2009.
