= Eugenia Ostapciuc =

President of the Moldovan Parliament from 2001 to 2005

Eugenia Ostapciuc OR
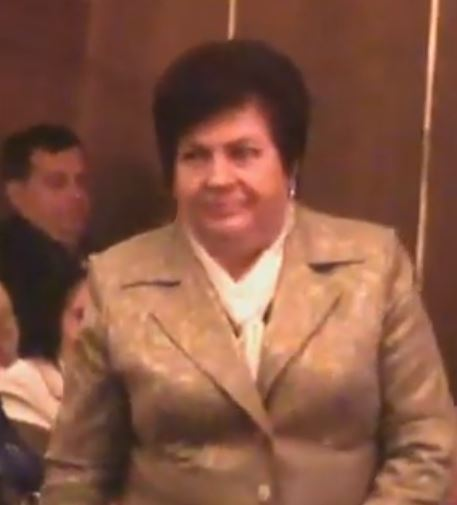
- Ostapciuc in 2016

5th President of the Moldovan Parliament
- In office 20 March 2001 – 24 March 2005
- President: Petru Lucinschi; Vladimir Voronin
- Prime Minister: Dumitru Braghiș; Vasile Tarlev
- Deputy: Vadim Mișin; Mihail Camerzan
- Preceded by: Dumitru Diacov
- Succeeded by: Marian Lupu

Member of the Moldovan Parliament
- In office 22 March 1998 – 22 April 2009
- Parliamentary group: Party of Communists

Personal details
- Born: 19 October 1947 (age 78) Fîntînița, Moldavian SSR, Soviet Union
- Education: Plekhanov Russian University of Economics

Eugenia Ostapciuc (born 19 October 1947) is a Moldovan politician who served as the 5th President of the Moldovan Parliament from 2001 to 2005. She was a member of the Party of Communists of the Republic of Moldova.
