= Valeriu Nemerenco =

Moldovan politician (born 1959)

Member of the Moldovan Parliament
- In office 22 April 2009 – 16 November 2012
- Succeeded by: Anatol Arhire
- Parliamentary group: Liberal Party

Personal details
- Born: 22 April 1959 (age 67)
- Party: Liberal Party; Alliance for European Integration (2009–present)
- Education: Moldova State University

Valeriu Nemerenco (born 22 April 1959) is a Moldovan politician.

He served as praetor of Chişinău's Buiucani district. He has been a member of the Parliament of Moldova since 2009.

Nemerenco's doctoral dissertation in law, Models and systems of public administration of the capital-municipalities, 2008, contains an in-depth analysis of the public municipality administration system in Chişinău.
