= Vadim Mișin =

Moldovan police officer and politician (1945–2016)

Vadim Mișin OR

Member of Moldovan Parliament
- In office 22 March 1998 – 9 December 2014
- Parliamentary group: Party of Communists

Vice President of the Moldovan Parliament
- In office 18 February 2000 – 24 March 2005
- President: Petru Lucinschi; Vladimir Voronin
- Prime Minister: Dumitru Braghiș; Vasile Tarlev
- Speaker: Dumitru Diacov; Eugenia Ostapciuc
- Succeeded by: Maria Postoico

Personal details
- Born: 12 March 1945 Kulsary, Kazakh SSR, Soviet Union
- Died: 18 October 2016 (aged 71) Chișinău, Moldova
- Party: Party of Communists of the Republic of Moldova (1993–2012); Revival Party (2012–2016)
- Education: Moldova State University
- Occupation: politician, police officer

Vadim Mișin (12 March 1945 – 18 October 2016) was a Moldovan general-major of police, and politician, member of Parliament of Moldova between 1998 and 2014, and former president of the Revival Party (2012–2016).

A long-time PCRM member, at 9 June 2012 he left the party together with Oleg Babenco and Tatiana Botnariuc.

== Honours ==
- 2005: Order of the Republic (Moldova)
