= Maria Postoico =

Moldovan politician (1950–2019)

Member of the Moldovan Parliament
- In office 22 March 1998 – 9 March 2019
- Parliamentary group: Party of Communists

Vice President of the Moldovan Parliament
- In office 31 March 2005 – 22 April 2009 Serving with: Iurie Roșca
- President: Vladimir Voronin
- Prime Minister: Vasile Tarlev; Zinaida Greceanîi
- Speaker: Marian Lupu
- Preceded by: Vadim Mișin
- Succeeded by: Grigore Petrenco

Personal details
- Born: 4 April 1950 Horodiște, Moldavian SSR, Soviet Union
- Died: 11 September 2019 (aged 69) Chișinău, Moldova

Maria Postoico (4 April 1950 – 11 September 2019) was a Communist Moldovan politician. She was elected vice president of the Parliament of the Republic of Moldova in 2005.

== Life ==
Postoico was born in Horodiște in 1950. She studied to be a lawyer at the State University of Moldova in 1978.

She worked as an inspector until she was elected to parliament in 1998.

She was elected as a Party of Communists of the Republic of Moldova deputy to the parliament on 24 January 2000 and she remained there until she joined the Moldovan parliament in 2005. She was elected in 2009 as part of the PCRM faction until 2016 being elected three times. She was elected as a Communist Party member with a working language of French.

On 31 March 2005 she was elected vice-President on the Moldovan parliament. She remained in parliament until 2018.

Postoico died in Chișinău in 2019 of an illness.
