= Dorin Chirtoacă =

Mayor of Chișinău from 2007 to 2018

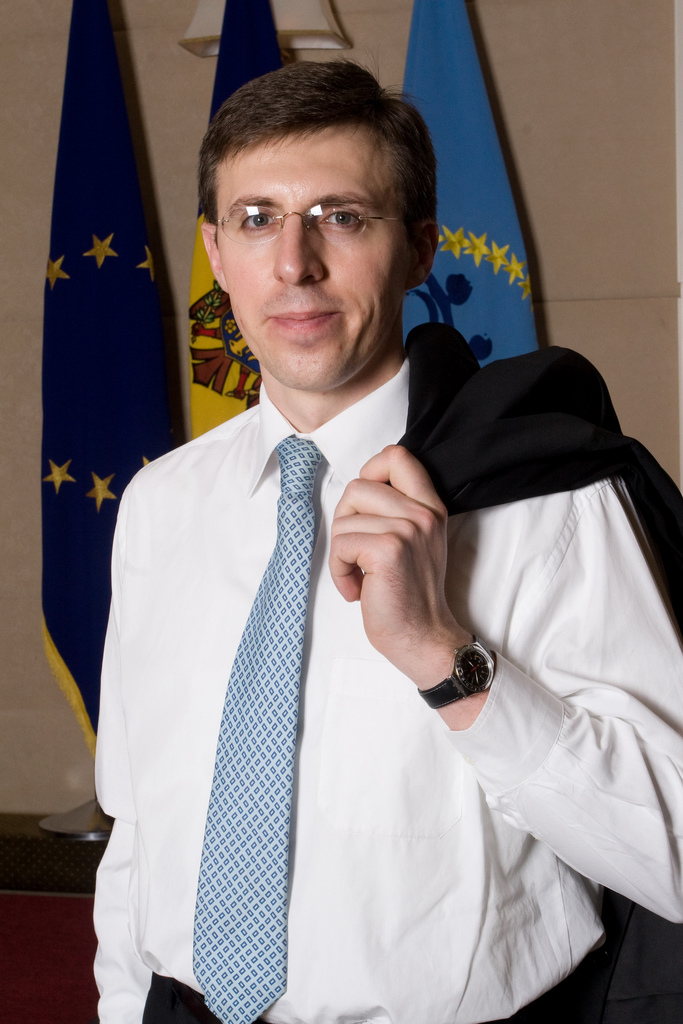
- Chirtoacă in 2009

Member of the Chișinău Municipal Council
- In office 2 November 2019 – 28 October 2021
- In office 13 July 2015 – 4 August 2015
- Succeeded by: Raisa Călin
- In office 11 July 2011 – 21 December 2011
- Succeeded by: Igor Călin
- In office 22 June 2007 – 26 July 2007
- Succeeded by: Vasile Toderașcu

Mayor of Chișinău
- In office 22 June 2007 – 16 February 2018
- Deputy: Nistor Grozavu; Vlad Coteț
- Preceded by: Veaceslav Iordan (acting)
- Succeeded by: Nistor Grozavu (acting)

Member of the Moldovan Parliament
- In office 9 December 2014 – 20 February 2015
- Succeeded by: Mihaela Iacob
- In office 14 August 2009 – 30 October 2009
- Succeeded by: Valeriu Munteanu
- In office 22 April 2009 – 12 June 2009

Personal details
- Born: 9 August 1978 (age 48) Colonița, Moldavian SSR, Soviet Union
- Citizenship: Moldova; Romania
- Party: Liberal Party (PL)
- Spouse: Anișoara Loghin (m. 2016; div. 2016)
- Relations: Gheorghe Ghimpu (uncle); Mihai Ghimpu (uncle)
- Education: University of Bucharest; Paris 1 Panthéon-Sorbonne University
- Occupation: Politician
- Profession: lawyer

Dorin Chirtoacă (born 9 August 1978) is a Moldovan politician who served as Mayor of Chișinău from 2007 to 2018.

== Biography ==
His mother is Valentina, sister of Gheorghe Ghimpu and Mihai Ghimpu. During high school, he studied in Iași and graduated in 2001 from University of Bucharest Faculty of Law. Between 2001 and 2003, Chirtoacă worked for Surprize, Surprize ("Surprises, Surprises"), a show broadcast on TVR1. Then he worked for the Helsinki Committee for Human Rights in Moldova (2003–2005) as Program Coordinator.

=== Political career ===
Dorin Chirtoacă has been the vice-president of the Liberal Party of Moldova (PL) since May 2005. Due to low turnout, the 2005 Chișinău election was invalidated, but he became the Mayor of Chişinău in 2007. He defeated his Communist Party (PCRM) opponent Veaceslav Iordan in the 2007 municipal elections, which resulted in a clear victory for a loose anti-communist coalition in the city of Chișinău (61.17%). He was considered to be the most important opponent of the communists in the April 2009 election and July 2009 election.

Chirtoacă won reelection as mayor of Chișinău in June 2011, narrowly defeating the candidate from the Communist Party of the Republic of Moldova, Igor Dodon. He received 50.6% of the votes to Dodon's 49.4%.

For the June 2015 Chișinău mayoral election, Chirtoacă registered on the last day. In the first tour, Chirtoacă received 37.52%, to Zinaida Greceanîi's (from PSRM) 35.68%. The two participated on 28 June 2015 in the second tour, Chirtoacă receiving 53.54% of votes and winning his third consecutive mandate of mayor of Chișinău.

On 13 September 2016, an attempt to organize a referendum to dismiss Chirtoacă from the post of mayor of Chișinău failed in the Chișinău municipal Council.

On 25 May 2017, Chirtoacă was arrested by anti-corruption prosecutors and National Anti-Corruption Center (CNA) officers, together with seven other employees of the Chișinău mayoralty, in the file of paid parking, being suspected of the traffic of influence. On 26 May, he was placed under home arrest for 30 days. On 22 June, his home arrest warrant was prolonged for 25 days, and then on 14 July for another 25 days.

On 28 July 2017, Chirtoacă was suspended from the office of the mayor of Chișinău until a final sentence in his case was issued, on the basis of a decision of Buiucani sector of Chișinău Court. His home arrest warrant was prolonged again with 30 days on 10 August, and then again on 11 September 2017. On 12 September 2017, the Chișinău municipal Council decided that on 19 November 2017 a referendum for Chirtoacă's dismissal would be held.

According to the polls made in 2019 concerning the most appreciated Moldovan politicians, Dorin Chirtoacă is positioned eleventh among the top of politicians which Moldovans have the highest trust and in another opinion poll it was positioned on the thirteenth position.

In 2020, Chirtoacă and four other Moldovan party leaders founded the Union Political Movement, a political bloc established for the unification of Moldova and Romania. He was later designated as the candidate of the bloc for the 2020 Moldovan presidential election.

== Personal life ==
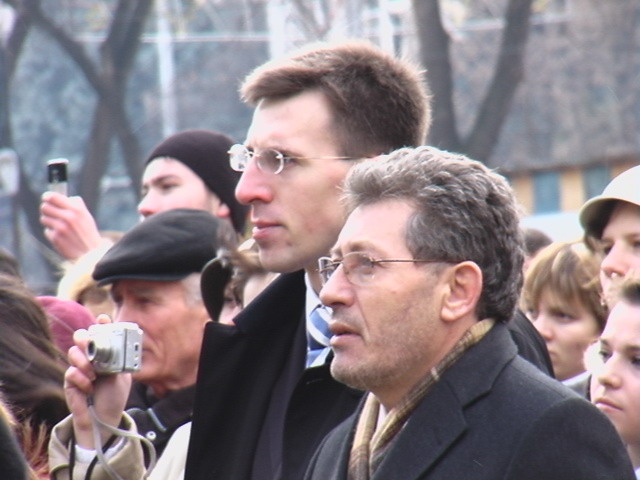
Chirtoacă (back) and his uncle Mihai Ghimpu (front)

Dorin Chirtoacă is the nephew of the Gheorghe and Mihai Ghimpu brothers, two Moldovan politicians and important figures in the national rebirth movement of the Moldovans in the late 1980s–early 1990s.

On 30 November 2013, Chirtoacă became godfather of Sofia Anais, the daughter of Elena Băsescu and Bogdan Ionescu, and the granddaughter of the former President of Romania Traian Băsescu.

Before the June 2015 Chișinău mayoral election, Chirtoacă stated that he would marry if he won the third mayor mandate. When this happened, on 31 August 2015, during the holiday celebrating the Romanian language, Chirtoacă asked the ProTV Chișinău journalist Anișoara Loghin to marry him, on the holiday stage in Great National Assembly Square, receiving an affirmative answer. On 20 May 2016 the couple married. During a press conference held on 6 December 2016, Chirtoacă has announced that they formally are divorced.

Chirtoacă speaks or has some knowledge of Romanian, French, English, Russian, and German.

== See also ==
- 2005 Chișinău mayoral election
