= 2007 Moldovan local elections =

Local elections were held in Moldova on June 3, 2007, with a runoff for mayors on June 17, 2007.

Voter turnout reached 52.34% nationwide and 37.17% in Chişinău municipality. Following the elections, district, municipal, town and village councils were elected, as well as 420 mayors.

Dorin Chirtoacă became mayor of Chişinău.
