= Liberal Party (Moldova) =

Liberal Party Partidul Liberal
- Abbreviation: PL
- President: Mihai Ghimpu
- Secretary-General: Sergiu Revenco; Lilian Chicu
- Founded: 5 September 1993
- Headquarters: 15 Nicolae Iorga Street, Chișinău
- Youth wing: Young Liberals
- Women's wing: Liberal Women's Organisation
- Membership (2018): 18,989
- Ideology: Liberalism; Conservative liberalism Moldovan–Romanian unionism Pro-Europeanism
- Political position: Centre-right
- National affiliation: Union Political Movement (2020–2021)
- Regional affiliation: Liberal South East European Network
- European affiliation: Alliance of Liberals and Democrats for Europe (observer)
- Colours: Light blue, yellow
- Parliament: 0 / 101
- District Presidents: 0 / 32

Website
- pl.md

Liberal Party (Romanian: Partidul Liberal, PL) is a conservative-liberal political party in Moldova. The president of the party is the former Acting President of Moldova, Mihai Ghimpu.

== History ==
The party was established under the name Party of Reform (Romanian: Partidul Reformei) in 1993 by Anatol Șalaru. In 1997, Mihai Ghimpu was elected chairman. Until April 2005, the party had a Christian-democratic electoral platform. Competing in the 1994, 1998, and 2001 parliamentary elections, the Party of Reform failed to enter parliament, as its results of 2.36%, 0.54% and 0.67%, respectively, failed to meet the electoral threshold of 5%.

=== Electoral success ===
At the second party congress, held on 24 April 2005, party members adopted the new name Liberal Party (Romanian: Partidul Liberal), along with a new logo and programme, which presented a liberal political platform. Mihai Ghimpu was elected president of the party. The party competed in the April 2009 parliamentary election, obtaining 13.13% of the vote and of 15 seats in parliament. At the parliamentary election of 2009 in July, the popular vote rose to 14.68%, again winning 15 seats.

As a consequence of the second parliamentary election of 2009, the party signed a coalition agreement with the Liberal Democratic Party (PLDM), the Democratic Party (PDM), and Our Moldova Alliance (AMN), constituting the Alliance for European Integration. The party was included in the First Filat Cabinet. At the 2010 parliamentary election, the party obtained 9.96% of the vote and 12 seats in parliament. The party remained in the Second Filat Cabinet. The European Action Movement (MAE) merged into the party in March 2011.

Under the leadership of Ghimpu, the party has altered its former Christian democratic orientation. On 25 January 2009, a Conference for the constitution of a Women's wing for the Liberal Party the "Liberal Women's Organisation" was held. The party also formed a youth wing the "Young Liberals". The party has joined the Alliance of Liberals and Democrats for Europe (ALDE) as an observer member.

At the 2014 parliamentary election, the Liberal Party received 9.7% of the vote, winning 13 seats. At the 2019 parliamentary election, the PL received 1.25% of the vote, losing its representation in parliament.

=== Internal split ===
In February 2013, the party suffered an internal split. On 12 April 2013, the Liberal Party Reform Council was launched, with Ion Hadârcă as leader. The members of this council were called "Liberal Reformers" by the media. The internal split became permanent when a separate Liberal Reformist Party (PLR) joined the Pro-European Coalition, formed after the dissolution of the Alliance for European Integration (AIE), remaining in the Leancă Cabinet after the Liberal Party (PL) left the government.

=== Creation of the Union Political Movement ===
In 2020, the Union Political Movement (MPU), a political bloc established for the unification of Moldova and Romania, was founded by five political parties, including the Liberal Party. Furthermore, Chirtoacă, leader of the PL, was designated as the candidate of the MPU for the 2020 Moldovan presidential election. He only received 1.2% of the cast votes and did not qualify for the 2nd round.

=== 2021 parliamentary elections ===
For the 2021 Moldovan parliamentary election, PL decided to compete along with PPR, USB, and AUR and managed to get 7,216 votes (0.49%), but failed to meet the 5% threshold.

== Electoral results ==
=== Parliament ===
Election year	# of total votes	% of overall vote	# of seats	+/–	Government
1994	41,980	2.36	0 / 101	Steady	Extra-parliamentary opposition
1998	8,844	0.54	0 / 101	Steady	Extra-parliamentary opposition
2001	10,686 (Note: Result of the electoral alliance "Faith and Justice".)	0.67	0 / 101	Steady	Extra-parliamentary opposition
2005	did not participate				Extra-parliamentary opposition
2009 (April)	201,879	13.13	15 / 101	▲15	Coalition
2009 (July)	232,108	14.68	15 / 101	Steady	Coalition
2010	171,445	9.96	12 / 101	▼3	Coalition
2014	154,507	9.67	13 / 101	▲1	Coalition
2019	17,743	1.25	0 / 101	▼13	Extra-parliamentary opposition
2021	with PPR, USB, and AUR		0 / 101	Steady	Extra-parliamentary opposition
2025	1,591	0.10	0 / 101	Steady	Extra-parliamentary opposition

In the 2007 local elections, the party gained 18.31% in Chișinău municipality and 11 seats on the Chișinău Municipal Council. Its vice-president, Dorin Chirtoacă, became Mayor.

== Notable members ==
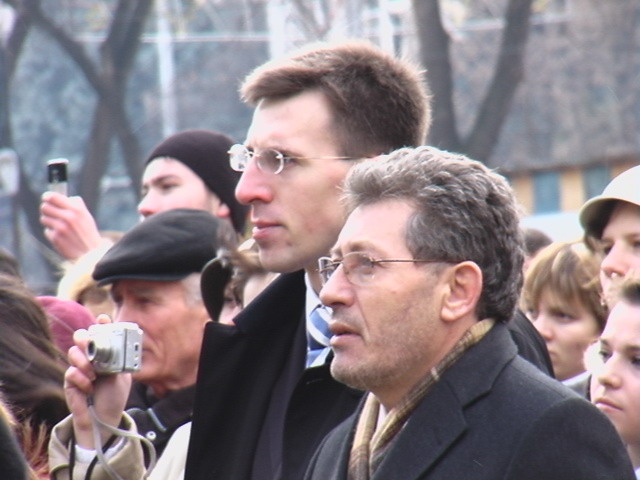
Mihai Ghimpu and Dorin Chirtoacă in 2008

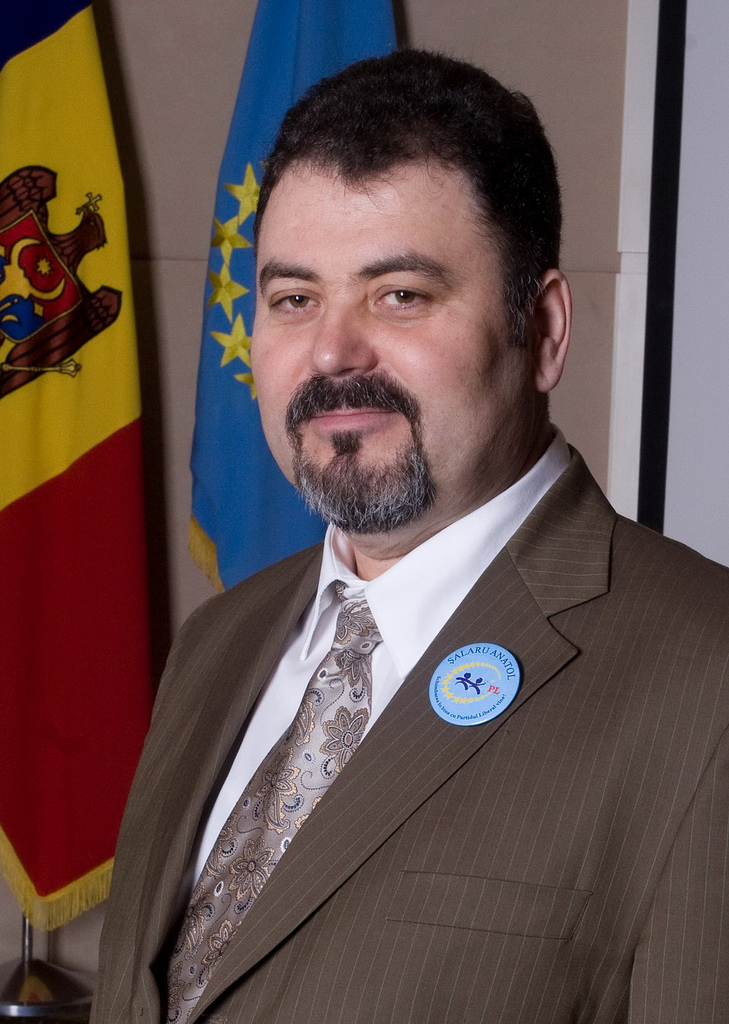
Anatol Șalaru in 2009

- Dorin Chirtoacă
- Mihai Ghimpu
- Corina Fusu
- Gheorghe Brega
- Boris Vieru
- Ion Apostol
- Ion Cebanu
- Valeriu Munteanu
- Ion Chicu

== Gallery ==
Votes won by PL in the April 2009 election by raion and municipality

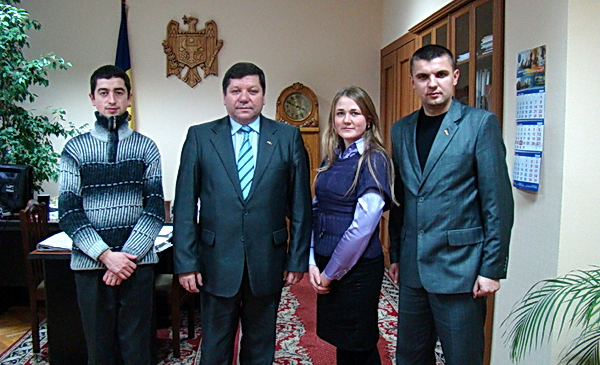
Young Liberals and Ion Negrei in November 2009
