= Arina =

Arina (Russian: Арина) is a Russian feminine given name, a variant of Irina. The Belarusian variant is Aryna (Арына), and the Ukrainian variant is Oryna (Орина). Translated from Greek, it means "peace" or "rest." Greek mythology also featured a goddess of peaceful life, Eirene, whose name became the origin of the names Arina and Irina.

Notable people with the name include:

- Arina Aleynikova (born 1943), Soviet actress
- Arina Averina (born 1998), Russian rhythmic gymnast
- Arina Bilotserkivska (born 1989), Ukrainian basketballer
- Arina Charopa (born 1995), Belarusian rhythmic gymnast
- Arina Ephipania (born 1978), Indonesian vocalist
- Arina Fedorovtseva (born 2004), Russian volleyball player
- Arina Folts (born 1997), Uzbekistani tennis player
- Arina Glazunova (2000–2024), Russian influencer who died after falling into an underground subway passage while taking a selfie video in Georgia
- Arina Gvozdetskaia (born 2008), Russian-Israeli rhythmic gymnast
- Arina Hugenholtz (1848–1934), Dutch painter
- Arina Kachan (born 1994), Belarusian judoka
- Arina Kaliandra (born 2006), Russian gymnast
- Arina Kobayashi, Japanese kickboxer
- Arina Martinova (born 1990), Russian figure skater
- Arina Nikishova (born 1997), Russian rhythmic gymnast
- Arina Okamanchuk, Estonian rhythmic gymnast
- Arina Openysheva (born 1999), Russian competitive swimmer
- Arina Rodionova (born 1989), Russian tennis player
- Aryna Sabalenka (born 1998), Belarusian tennis player
- Arina Sharapova (born 1961), Russian TV presenter and journalist
- Arina Shulgina (born 1991), Russian triathlete
- Arina Sobakina (1762–?), Russian ballerina and stage actress
- Arina Spătaru, Moldovan businesswoman and politician
- Arina Surkova (born 1998), Russian swimmer
- Arina Tanemura (born 1978), Japanese manga artist
- Arina Tsitsilina (born 1998), Belarusian rhythmic gymnast
- Arina Ushakova (born 1989), Russian pair skater and coach
- Arina Ushakova (born 2002), Russian ice dancer
- Arina Bulanova (born 1999), Russian musical artist
