= Ungheni District =

Ungheni District Raionul Ungheni
- District
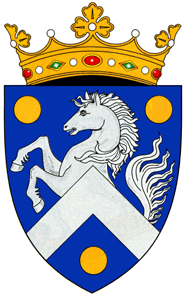
- Flag Coat of arms

- Coordinates: 47°20′N 27°55′E
- Country: Republic of Moldova
- Administrative center (Oraş-reşedinţă): Ungheni
- Established: 2002

Government
  - Raion President: Dionisie Ternovschi (Party of Action and Solidarity)

Area
  - Total: 1,082.6 km^{2} (418.0 sq mi)
  - Water: 27.1 km^{2} (10.5 sq mi) 2.50%
- Elevation: 408 m (1,339 ft)

Population (2024)
  - Total: 75,804
  - Density: 70.020/km^{2} (181.35/sq mi)
- Time zone: UTC+2 (EET)
  - Summer (DST): UTC+3 (EEST)
- Area code: +373 36
- Car plates: UN

Ungheni (Romanian pronunciation: [uŋˈɡenʲ]) is a district (Romanian: raion) in the central part of Moldova, bordering Romania, with the administrative center at Ungheni. The other major city is Cornești. As of the 2024 Moldovan census, its population was 75,804.

== History ==
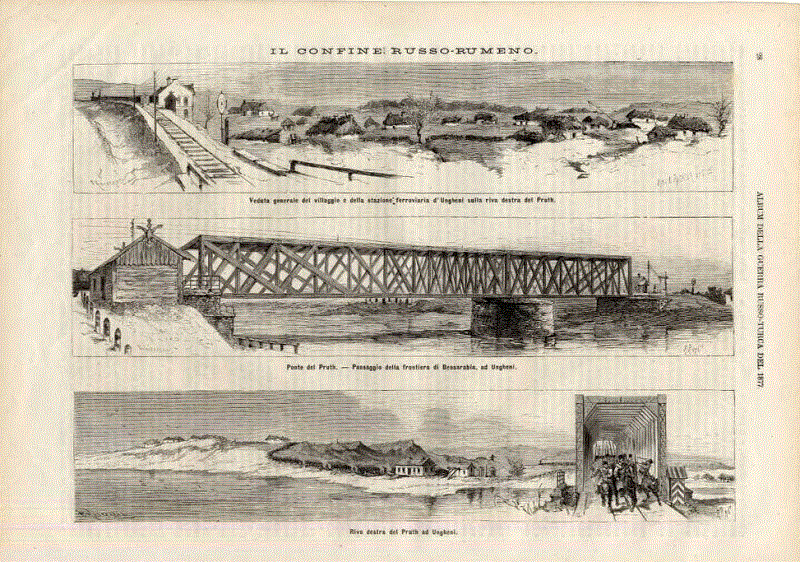
Eiffel Bridge built in 1876–1877

Villages with ancient historical credentials are Buciumeni, Busila and Ungheni, they are documented in the period 1428–1430. About noble families who ruled the territory known as follows: the 1462 Pan Bratul, Procelnic's son, reigned here. This Procelnic was Stoian, advice nobleman in the reign of Alexander the Good, and participant in the Battle of Grunwald in 1422. Other relatives of the warrior, master settlement in 1490, until the 17th century. Beginning with the reign of Vasile Lupu, his cousin, marshal Iorga, buy here parts of estates. After his death he bequeathed to the village of his sisters Alexandra and Creata. Their life in Ungheni died in the late 18th century. In 1812 the Treaty of Bucharest, Basarabia is occupied by the Russian Empire at this time (1812–1917), has an intense russification of the native population. In 1876–1877 is built spotted Prut between Ungheni (Moldova) and common Ungheni (Romania) Eiffel Bridge, designed by Gustave Eiffel, the creator of the Eiffel Tower in Paris, Gustave Eiffel visited Ungheni during this period. In 1918 after the collapse of the Russian Empire, Basarabia joins Romania, in this period (1918–1940, 1941–1944) is part of the Iași County. In 1940 after Molotov–Ribbentrop Pact, Bessarabia is occupied by the USSR. In 1991 as a result of the proclamation of Independence of Moldova, part and residence of the Ungheni County (1991–2003), and in 2003 became administrative unit of Moldova.

== Geography ==
Ungheni district is located in central part of the Republic of Moldova. It borders in north with Fălești and Sîngerei district, east Telenești and Călărași districts, in southeast Nisporeni District and has state border with Romania over a distance of 80 km. Terrain, slippery due to the Central Moldavian Plateau, west along the Prut River valley is a depression that is Ungheni. Just district is located in the woodlands, Codri. Soil chernozems (75%) in valleys and plains and brown soil on the plateau. The highest point of the district is Veverița Hill, 408 meters.

=== Climate ===
Temperate continental climate. The average annual temperature 9 °C (48 °F), average temperature in July 21 °C (70 °F), and average temperature in January −4.5 °C (24 °F). Annual precipitation 500–650 mm. Average wind speed 3–5 m \ s.

=== Fauna ===
Animal fauna characterized by: fox, wild boar, wolf, deer, red deer, raccoon dog, hedgehog, badger, wild cat and others. Of birds: hawk, stork, egret, partridges, crow, tits, sparrows and others.

=== Flora ===
Forests occupy 26.6% area of the district, are characterized by oak, beech, hornbeam, maple, acacia, lime and others. From plants: clover, black, fescue, mugwort, nettle and others.

=== Rivers ===
District is located in the basin of the Prut River, crossed the Prut in west of district, the border with Romania over a distance of 80 km. The main tributary is Delia. Are 132 ponds. For rural areas groundwater is the main source of household drinking water. They come to the surface through wells 6170 (70 fountains) and 67 springs. Most are kept and landscaped.

== Administrative subdivisions ==
- Localities: 74
  - Administrative center: Ungheni
    - Cities: Cornești, Ungheni
      - Communes: 31
        - Villages: 41

== Demographics ==
In the 2024 Census, the district population was 75,804 of which 36.7% urban and 63.3% rural population

=== Ethnic groups ===
Ethnic group	% of total
Moldovans *	91.0
Romanians *	5.0
Ukrainians	2.70
Russians	0.8
Romani	0.1
Other	0.2
Undeclared	0.1

Footnote: * There is an ongoing controversy regarding the ethnic identification of Moldovans and Romanians.

=== Religion ===
- Christians – 99.2%
  - Orthodox Christians – 97.5%
  - Protestant – 1.6%
- Muslims - 0.1%
- Other – 0.1%
- No Religion – 0.3%
- Not Declared - 0.3%

== Economy ==
Currently over 16,600 businesses are registered. After legal form a share is the great farms, individual companies and limited liability companies. Agricultural land is 49,970.8 ha (46.1%) of total land area. Arable land is 45,181.3 ha (41.7%) of the total agricultural land, of which: plantations of orchards – 2951.7 ha (2.7%), vineyards – 1534.1 (1.4%) ha. The main crops are: cereals (wheat, oats), corn, sunflower, rapeseed and soy.

=== Industry ===
Processing industry of agricultural production is represented by companies that process raw material milling units, bakery and compound feed in enterprises producing meat products, canned fruit and vegetables, alcoholic beverages and soft drinks. A share of 80% in industry in district, has fiber preparation, spinning, carpet and rugs.

District is traditional for the production of ceramic. At activates Ungheni over half a century artistic ceramics factory.

== Politics ==
In terms of political and electoral, Ungheni district said the center-right parties in Moldova represented by the AEI. While the PCRM is in a continuous fall.

During the last three elections AEI had an increase of 79.5%

Parliament elections results
Year	AEI	PCRM
2010	51.70% 26,287	42.35% 21,535
July 2009	48.55% 23,309	46.68% 22,408
April 2009	30.15% 14,644	53.83% 26,142

=== Elections ===
Summary of 28 November 2010 Parliament of Moldova election results in Ungheni District
Parties and coalitions	Votes	%	+/−
Party of Communists of the Republic of Moldova	21,535	42.35	−4.33
Liberal Democratic Party of Moldova	13,367	26.29	+11.77
Democratic Party of Moldova	7,473	14.70	+0.18
Liberal Party	3,581	7.04	−5.92
Party Alliance Our Moldova	1,866	3.67	−3.89
European Action Movement	763	1.50	+1.50
Other Party	2,295	4.48	-0.29
Total (turnout 58.44%)	51,241	100.00	

== Culture ==
The district operates: houses and cultural centers – 62 units, amateur artistic groups with the honorary title "model" −28, museums – 3 units (Ungheni, Pirlita, Sculeni), public libraries – 51 units, a music school, a fine arts, a cinema, discotheques, sports halls work, fitness, pool.

== Health ==
Medical institutions can be found by: hospitals – two units with 375 beds, health centers – 16 units, offices of family doctors – 24 units, pharmacies – 24 units, emergency medical assistance – one substation.

== Tourism ==
- Aleksandr Nevski Church
- Museum of History and Ethnography Ungheni
- Nature reserve "Plaiul Fagului"
- Pirlita village museum
- Semeni medieval military fortress
- Trinity martyrs nation

== Personalities ==
- I. A. L. Diamond – Comedy writer in Hollywood from the 1940–1980
- Gheorghe Papuc – Minister of Internal Affairs of Moldova in 2002–2009
- Samuel Cohen – Composer of the national anthem of Israel, Hatikvah
- Vasile Șoimaru – Economist, lecturer and journalist
- Vasile Vasilache – Writer

== See also ==
Ungheni County
