= Evelin Naptal =

Estonian rhythmic gymnast (born 2003)

- Born: 16 December 2003 (age 22) Tallinn, Estonia
- Height: 170 cm (5 ft 7 in)

Gymnastics career
- Discipline: Rhythmic gymnastics
- Country represented: Estonia (2020-)
- Club: VK Noorus
- Head coaches: Natalja Bestsastnaja, Irina Stadnik
Medal record
Representing Estonia
Rhythmic gymnastics
| Event | 1st | 2nd | 3rd |
|---|---|---|---|
| Grand Prix Series | 0 | 1 | 3 |
| European Championships | 0 | 0 | 1 |
| Total | 0 | 1 | 4 |
European Championships
| Bronze medal – third place | 2020 Kyiv | 5 Balls |

Evelin Naptal (born 16 December 2003) is an Estonian rhythmic gymnast. She won bronze with 5 balls at the 2020 European Championships.

== Personal life ==
Naptal took up rhythmic gymnastics at age four, her idols are Margarita Mamun, Anastasia Salos and Sofia Raffaeli. She studied at the Audentes International School in Tallinn, her hobbies outside the gym include reading, playing the guitar, painting.

== Career ==
Evelin integrated the Estonian national group in 2020. The season was cut short due to the COVID-19 pandemic, but she competed at the 2020 European Championships in Kyiv, where she and her teammates Laurabell Kabrits, Arina Okamanchuk, Carmely Reiska and Alina Vesselova made history by winning Estonia's first European medal: bronze in the 5 balls final, behind Ukraine and Israel.

In 2021 Naptal took part in the World Championships in Kitakyushu, Japan. The Estonian group made of Evelin, Laurabell Kabrits, Arina Okamanchuk, Carmely Reiska, Alina Vesselova finished 13th in the All-Around and both the routines.

She was selected for the 2022 European Championships in Tel Aviv, the group finished 15th in the All-Around, 18th with 5 hoops and 9th with 3 ribbons + 2 balls. In September she participated in the World Championships in Sofia, where she along with teammates Adelina Beljajeva, Mirtel Korbelainen, Kiara Oja, Arina Okamanchuk, Alina Vesselova was 20th in the All-Around, 15th with 5 hoops and 18th with 3 ribbons + 2 balls.
