= Laurabell Kabrits =

Estonian rhythmic gymnast (born 1999)

- Born: 3 March 1999 (age 27) Tallinn, Estonia

Gymnastics career
- Discipline: Rhythmic gymnastics
- Country represented: Estonia (2017-2021)
- Head coaches: Natalja Bestsastnaja, Irina Stadnik
Medal record
Representing Estonia
Rhythmic gymnastics
Event	1st	2nd	3rd
European Championships	0	0	1
Grand Prix series	0	1	3
Total	0	1	4
European Championships
Bronze medal – third place	2020 Kyiv	5 balls

Laurabell Kabrits (born 3 March 1999) is an Estonian rhythmic gymnast. She won bronze with 5 balls at the 2020 European Championships.

== Personal life ==
Kabrits took up gymnastics at age seven. Outside the gym her hobbies are taking walks, shopping, travelling, reading. Laurabell received the 2021 For Services to Gymnastics award from the Estonian Gymnastics Federation. She's studying nursing at the Tallinn Health Care College. She speaks Estonian, English, and Russian.

== Career ==
Laurabell debuted at the 2015 World Cup in Lisbon, finishing 37th in the All-Around, 35th with hoop, 39th with ball, 39th with clubs and 38th with ribbon. In 2017, she participated at the European Championships in Budapest where she performed with hoop and clubs taking 37th and 43rd places. In August of that year she competed at the World Cup in Kazan, finishing 39th in the All-Around. She was then selected for the World Championships in Pesaro, being 47th in the All-Around, 46th with hoop, 57th with ball, 46th with clubs, and 50th with ribbon.

In 2018, Kabrits took part in the World Cup in Sofia ending 41st in the All-Around, 39th with hoop, 28th with ball, 46th with clubs, and 38th with ribbon. In 2019, she integrated the senior national group participating in the European Games in Minsk taking 7th place, and the World Championships in Baku being 19th in the All-Around, 19th with 5 balls, and 18th with 3 hoops and 4 clubs.

In 2020, the season was cut short thanks to the COVID-19 pandemic but she competed at the 2020 European Championships in Kyiv, where her and her teammates Evelin Naptal, Arina Okamanchuk, Carmely Reiska and Alina Vesselova made history by winning Estonia's first European medal: bronze in the 5 balls final, behind Ukraine and Israel.

In 2021, Kabritsl took part in the World Championships in Kitakyushu, Japan. The Estonian group made of Evelin, Evelin Naptal, Arina Okamanchuk, Carmely Reiska, Alina Vesselova finished 13th in the All-Around and both the routines.

Since 2022, she has worked as head coach of the Garant Gymnastics club in Tallinn.
