= Alina Vesselova =

Estonian rhythmic gymnast (born 2003)

- Born: 22 August 2003 (age 23) Tallinn, Estonia
- Height: 163 cm (5 ft 4 in)

Gymnastics career
- Discipline: Rhythmic gymnastics
- Country represented: Estonia (2017-)
- Club: SK Nord
- Head coaches: Natalja Bestsastnaja, Irina Stadnik
Medal record
Representing Estonia
Rhythmic gymnastics
Event	1st	2nd	3rd
Grand Prix Series	0	1	3
European Championships	0	0	1
Total	0	1	4
European Championships
Bronze medal – third place	2020 Kyiv	5 Balls

Alina Vesselova (born 22 August 2003) is an Estonian rhythmic gymnast. She won bronze with 5 balls at the 2020 European Championships.

== Personal life ==
Vesselova took up the sport when she was 3 and half, her mother made her try it and she immediately loved it. Vesselova speaks Estonian, English and Russian. Her ambition is to compete at the Olympic Games. Her hobbies are painting and drawing. Her sport idol is Neymar while she considers Audrey Hepburn her role model.

== Career ==
Vesselova competed at the 2017 European Championships in Budapest, as a member of the Estonian junior group, finishing 7th in the All-Around.

Vesselova integrated the senior national group in 2019, taking part in the World Championships in Baku where the group finished 19th in the All-Around and with 5 balls and 18th with 3 hoops + 4 clubs.

In 2020 the season was cut short due to the COVID-19 pandemic but she competed at the 2020 European Championships in Kyiv, where her and her teammates Laurabell Kabrits, Evelin Naptal, Carmely Reiska and Arina Okamanchuk made history by winning Estonia's first European medal: bronze in the 5 balls final, behind Ukraine and Israel.

In 2021 Alina took part in the World Championships in Kitakyushu, Japan. The Estonian group made of Alina, Laurabell Kabrits, Evelin Naptal, Carmely Reiska, Arina Okamanchuk finished 13th in the All-Around and both the routines.

She was selected for the 2022 European Championships in Tel Aviv, the group finished 15th in the All-Around, 18th with 5 hoops and 9th with 3 ribbons + 2 balls. In September she participated in the World Championships in Sofia, where she along with teammates Adelina Beljajeva, Mirtel Korbelainen, Kiara Oja, Evelin Naptal, Arina Okamanchuk was 20th in the All-Around, 15th with 5 hoops and 18th with 3 ribbons + 2 balls.
