= Unțești =

- Commune and village
- Location in Moldova
- Coordinates: 47°15′N 27°49′E
- Country: Moldova
- District: Ungheni District

Government
  - Mayor: Nicolae Sorotinschi (PSRM)

Population (2014 census)
  - Total: 1,585
- Time zone: UTC+2 (EET)
  - Summer (DST): UTC+3 (EEST)

Unțești is a village in Ungheni District, Moldova.

== Demographics ==
According to the 2014 Moldovan census, Unțești had a population of 1,585 residents. The village spans an area of 18.3 square kilometers, with a population density of approximately 86.6 inhabitants per square kilometer as of the 2014 census. Between 2004 and 2014, Unțești experienced a population decrease of about 1.2%.

The gender distribution was fairly balanced, with women making up 51.5% of the population and men 48.5%. In terms of age structure, 20.5% of residents were under 15 years old, 70.3% were of working age (15–64), and 9.1% were aged 65 or older. The entire population lived in rural areas.

Most residents (98%) were born in Moldova, while a small minority (1.7%) came from other countries within the Commonwealth of Independent States. The village's ethnic composition was predominantly Moldovan (95.2%), with small communities of Romanians (3.7%) and Ukrainians (0.7%).

In terms of native language, 88% of the population reported speaking Moldovan, while 10.9% said Romanian was their mother tongue. Small numbers of residents reported Ukrainian (0.4%) or Russian (0.5%) as their first language.

Religiously, the vast majority of the population (97.9%) identified as Orthodox, with a small number (0.9%) adhering to other faiths.

== Administration and local government ==
Unțești is governed by a local council composed of nine members. The most recent local elections, in November 2023, resulted in the following composition: 7 councillors from the Party of Socialists of the Republic of Moldova and 2 councillors from the Party of Action and Solidarity. The Party of Development and Consolidation of Moldova and the Liberal Democratic Party of Moldova also ran, but didn't receive enough votes to select councillors. In the same elections, the candidate from the Party of Socialists of the Republic of Moldova, Nicolae Sorotinschi, was elected as mayor with a 75.33 majority of the vote.

== Notable people ==
- Vasile Vasilache
