= Pîrlița, Ungheni =

Pîrlița
- Commune
- Location in Moldova
- Coordinates: 47°19′N 27°52′E
- Country: Moldova
- District: Ungheni District

Population (2014)
  - Total: 5,564
- Time zone: UTC+2 (EET)
  - Summer (DST): UTC+3 (EEST)

Pîrlița is a commune in Ungheni District, Moldova. It is composed of two villages, Hristoforovca and Pîrlița.

== Villages ==
=== Hristoforovca ===
Hristoforovca is located at a latitude of 47.3547, a longitude of 27.9183, and an altitude of 75 meters above sea level. It is 20 kilometers from Ungheni. According to the 2004 census, the population was 570 inhabitants.

The village was first mentioned in 1912. It was located on the estate of the boyar Hristofor Anuș, which gave rise to its name, and was situated downhill from Cornești. Reportedly, he and his family founded a wooden church around the same time. During the Soviet period, it hosted a branch of the Codrii sovkhoz, which specialized in growing apples and grapes. At the time, the village featured a school with eight grades, a kindergarten, a club, a library, a post office and a store.

== Notable people ==
- Mihai Godea
