= Sobakin =

Sobakin, feminine" Sobakina is a Russian surname associated with several noble Sobakin families which traces his line from a Данило Григорьевич nicknamed Собака (Sobaka, literally 'dog'). Notable people with the surname include:

- Arina Sobakina (1762 – ??) Russian ballerina and stage actress
- Ayyyna Sobakina (born 1994), Russian draughts player
- Marfa Sobakina (1552–1571), tsarina of Russia as the third wife of Ivan the Terrible
- Savva Sobakin, birth name of Savva Yakovlev (1713–1784), Russian entrepreneur, industrialist, philanthropist, and one of the Russian richest people of his time

== See also ==
- Sobakevich
