= Eiffel Bridge, Ungheni =

Bridge between Moldova and Romania

Eiffel Bridge
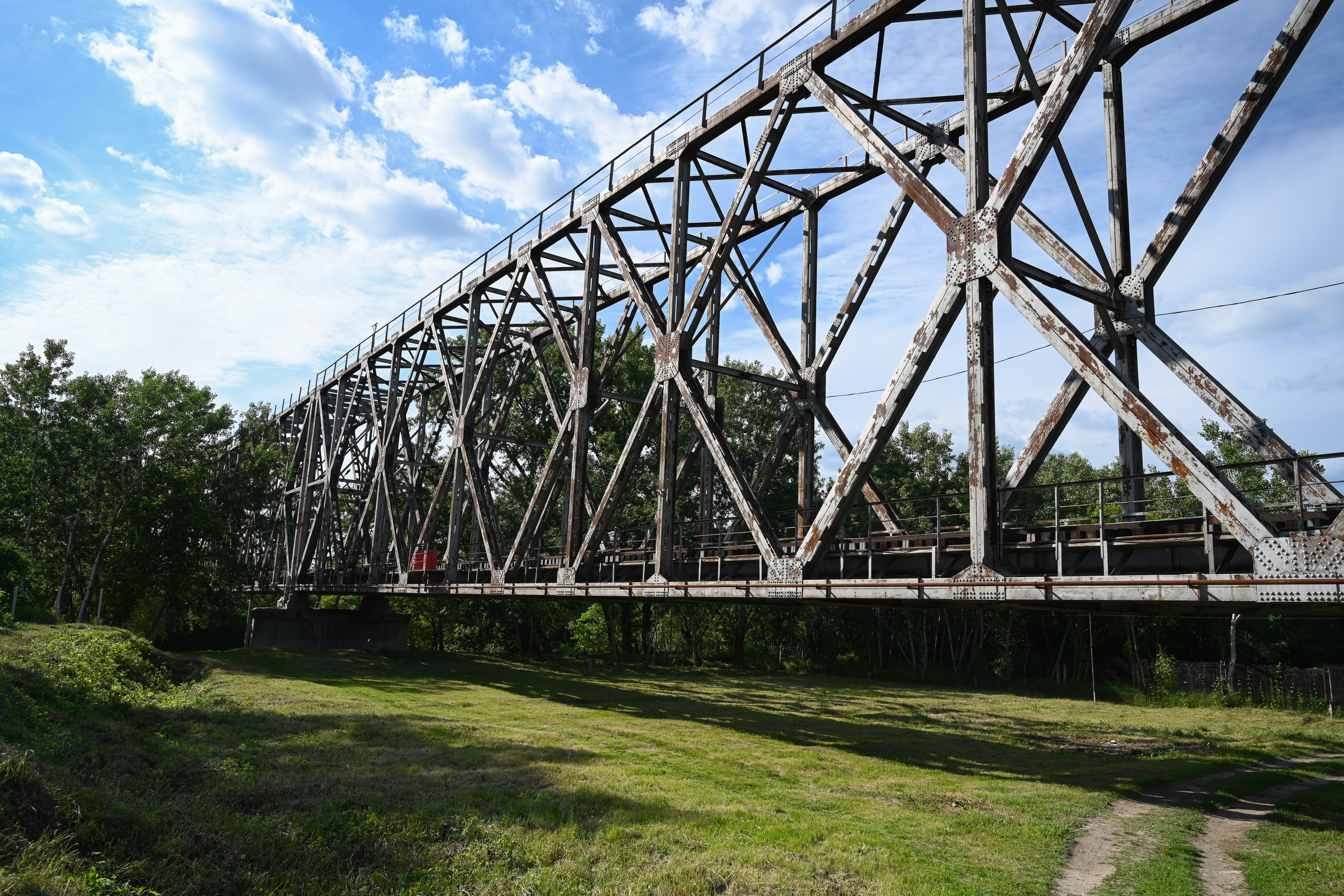
- Coordinates: 47°11′59.6″N 27°47′13.5″E
- Crosses: Prut
- Locale: between Ungheni and Ungheni, Iași
- Preceded by: A bridge built in 1874

History
- Designer: Nikolai Belelubsky
- Opened: 21 April [O.S. 9 April] 1877

Location
- Interactive map of Eiffel Bridge

The Eiffel Bridge (Romanian: Podul Eiffel) is a bridge over the River Prut and a checkpoint between Moldova and Romania. The bridge is located between Ungheni, Moldova and Ungheni, Romania.

== History ==
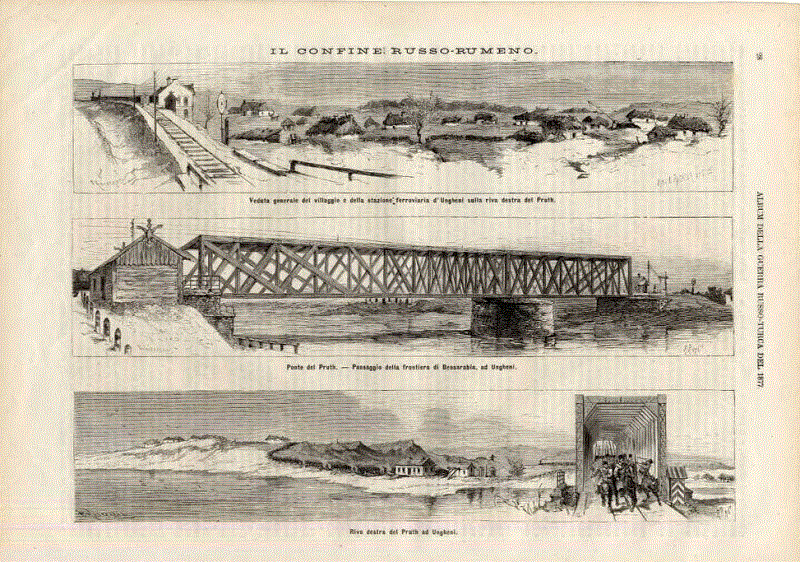
The bridge in c. 1880

On 18 May [O.S. 6 May] 1872 a Russian diplomatic agent, Ivan Alekseevich Zinov'ev, and Gheorghe Costaforu signed a rail junction convention, which was ratified on 21 January [O.S. 9 January] 1873. and the Iași-Ungheni railway was opened on 1 August 1874. The railway Chișinău-Cornești-Ungheni (built 1871–1875) was opened on 1 June 1875 by the Russian Empire in preparation for the Russo-Turkish War (1877–1878). Ungheni customs were established in 1875 after putting into operation the Chișinău-Ungheni-Iași railroad. The railway Chișinău-Cornești was already opened in 1873.

The first metal bridge was built according to the design of the Russian engineer Nikolai Belelubsky between 1874-1876. The first Russian troops crossed the bridge in 1877. Due to a testing process that lasted another 5 years, the bridge did not come into civilian use until 1881. It was blown up by retreating Russian troops on 22 June 1941 and rebuilt for the needs of German-Romanian troops. Bombed in 1944, it was rebuilt by the Russians between 1944 and 1946.

Today, the bridge remains a strategically positioned construction under the supervision of border guards.

== Gallery ==
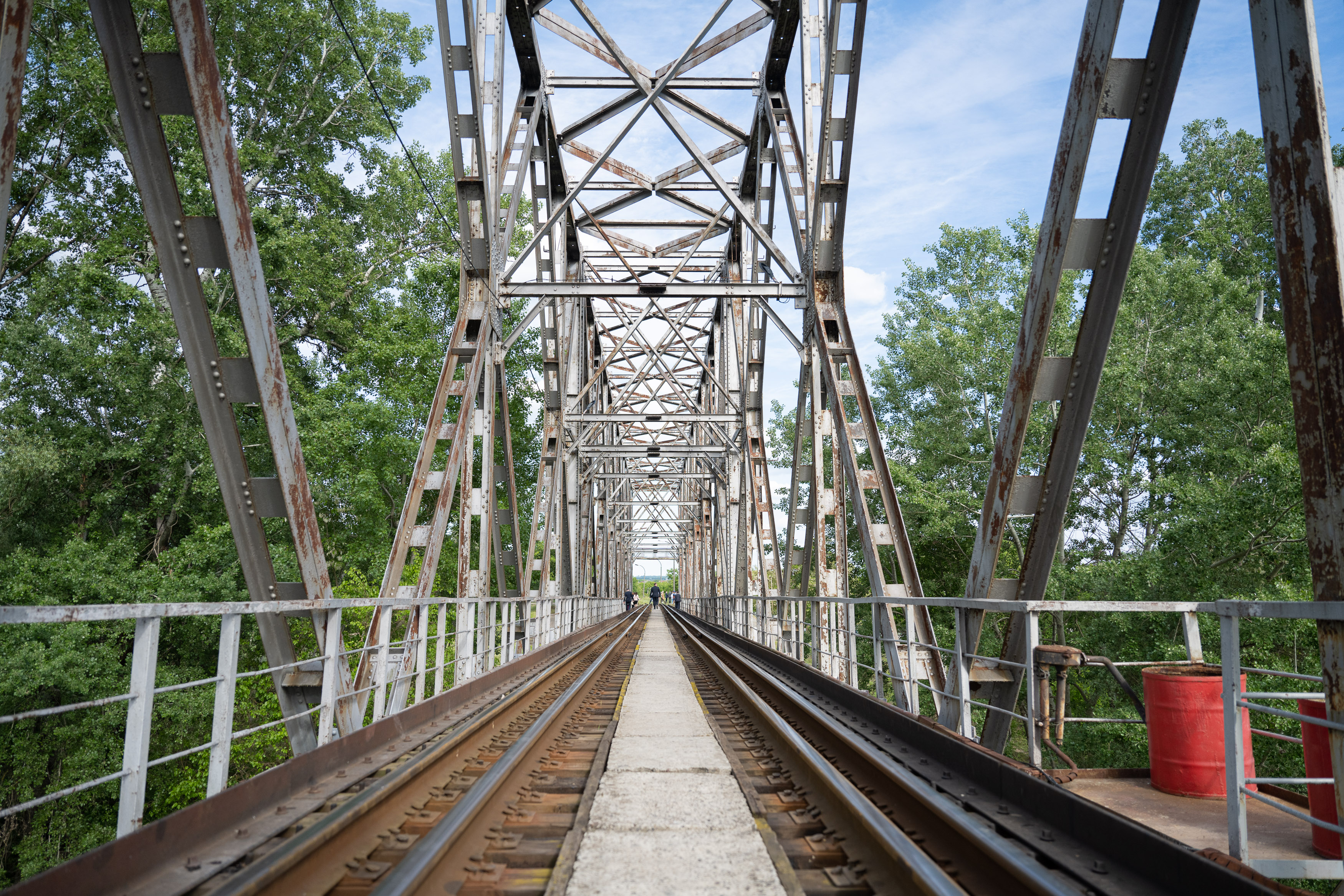
The bridge in 2024

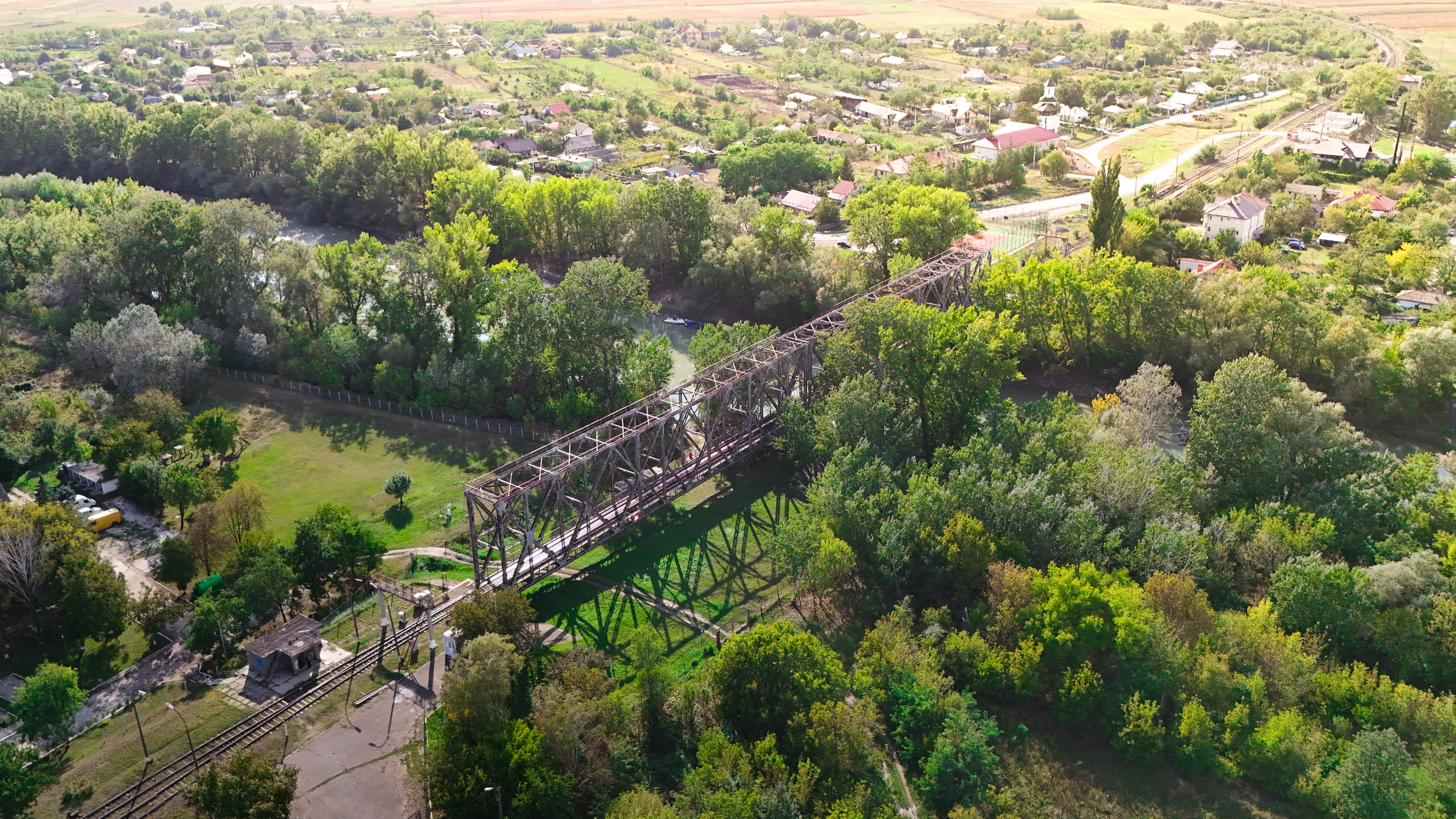
Aerial view of the Eiffel Bridge

== See also ==
- Moldovan–Romanian relations
- List of bridges in Moldova
- List of bridges in Romania
