= Zagarancea =

- Commune
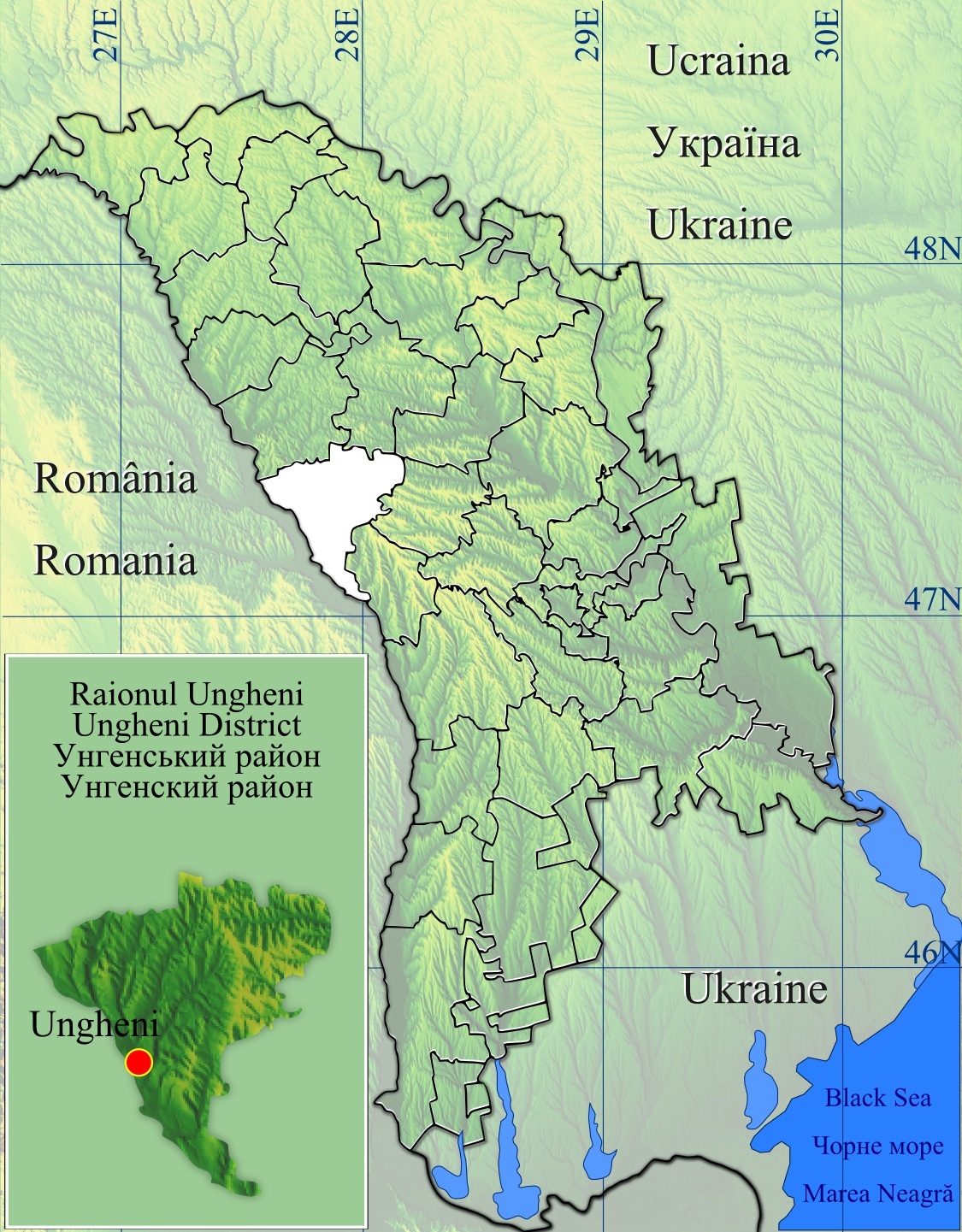
- Location within Ungheni
- Coordinates: 47°14′36″N 27°46′3″E
- Country: Moldova
- District: Ungheni District

Government
  - Mayor: Burlacu Mihail, PCRM 2007

Population (2014)
  - Total: 3,299
- Time zone: UTC+2 (EET)
  - Summer (DST): UTC+3 (EEST)
- Postal code: MD-3652

Zagarancea is a commune in Ungheni District, Moldova. It is composed of three villages: Elizavetovca, Semeni and Zagarancea.
