= Buciumeni, Ungheni =

Buciumeni
- Commune
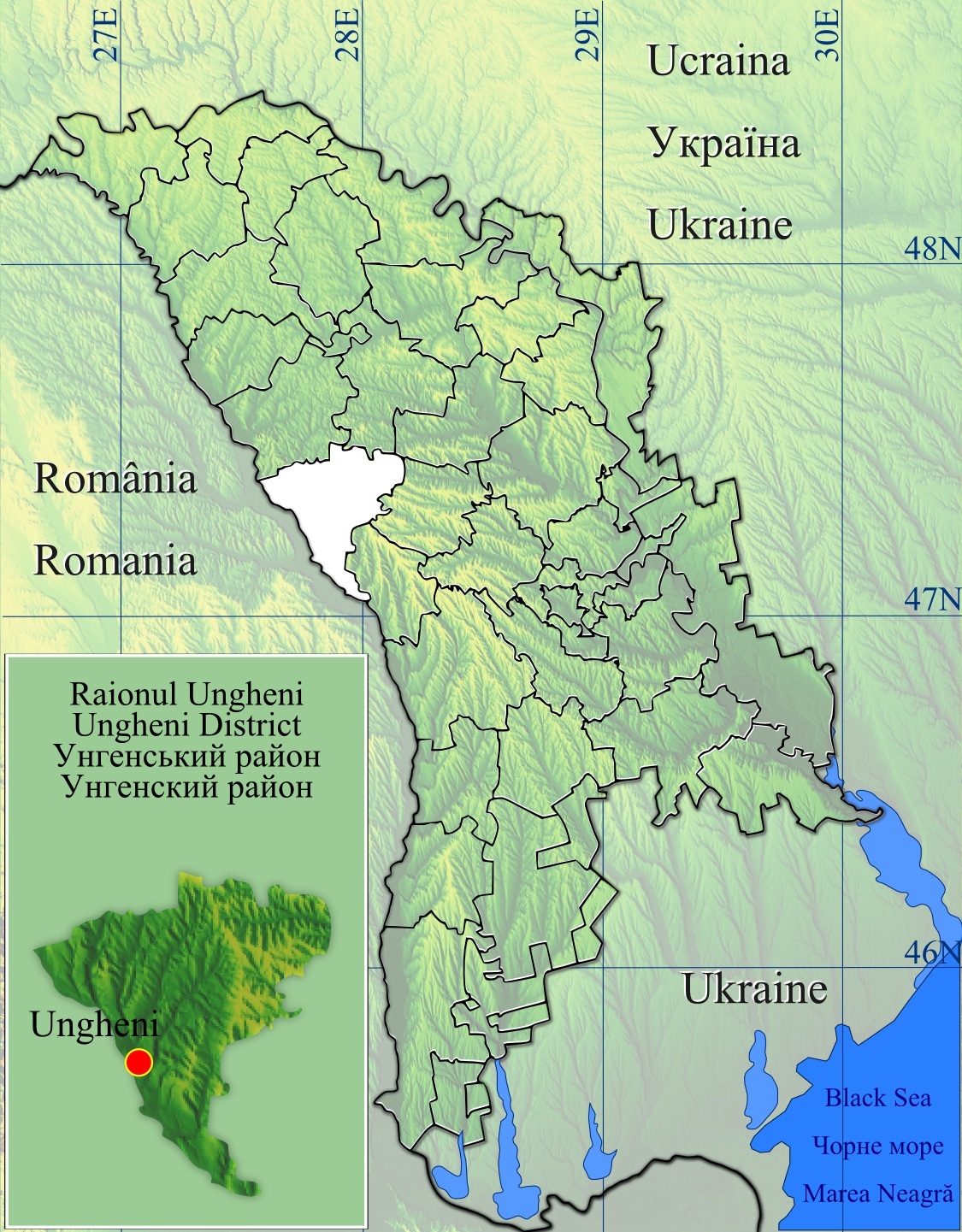
- Location within Ungheni
- Coordinates: 47°22′5″N 27°42′33″E
- Country: Moldova

Government
  - Mayor: Bereghici Ilie

Population (2014)
  - Total: 1,266
- Time zone: UTC+2 (EET)
  - Summer (DST): UTC+3 (EEST)
- Postal code: MD-3627

Buciumeni is a commune in Ungheni District, Moldova. It is composed of three villages: Buciumeni, Buciumeni station and Florești.
