= Bușila =

- Village
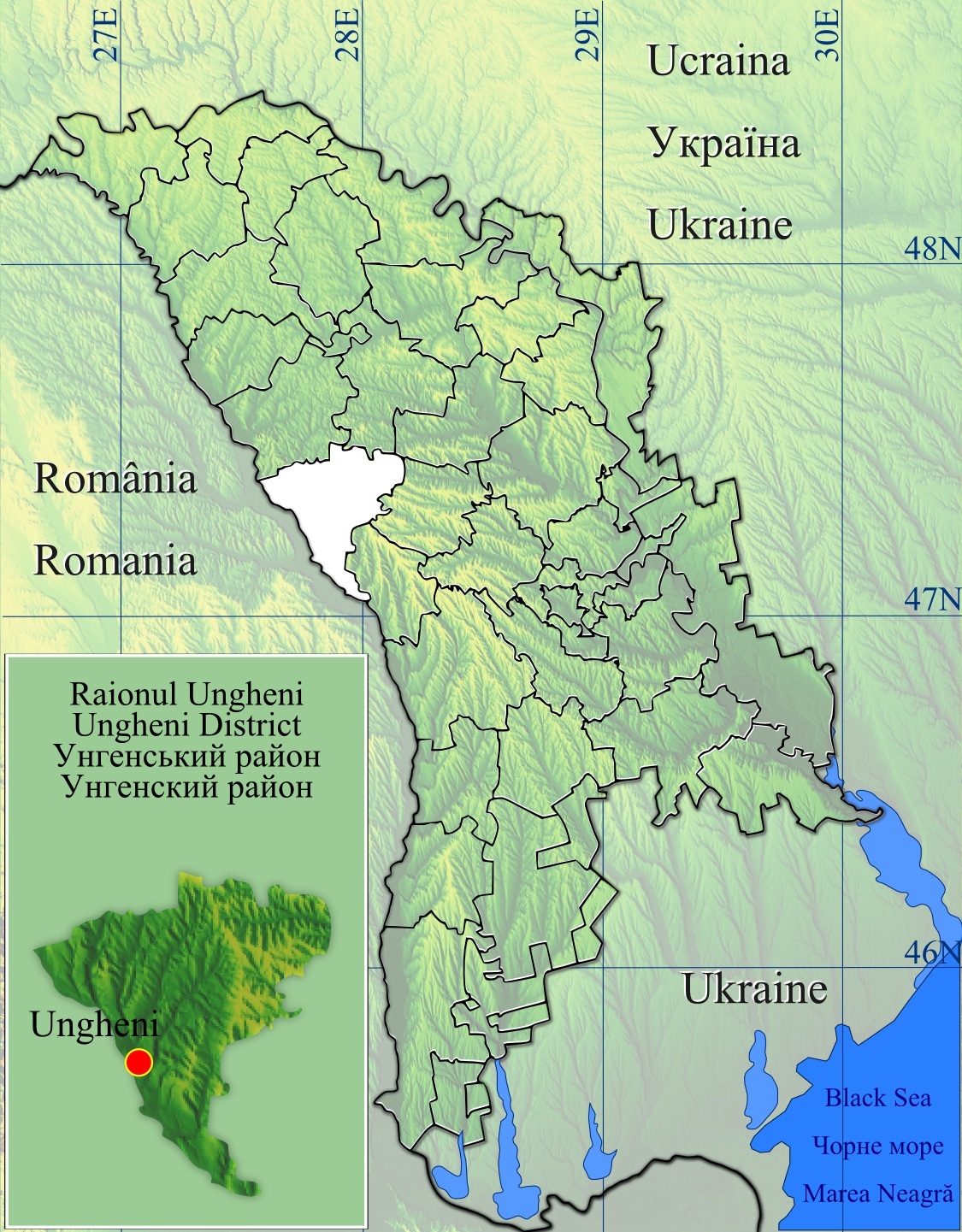
- Location within Ungheni
- Coordinates: 47°23′21″N 27°48′47″E
- Country: Moldova

Government
  - Primar: Igor Vîrlan (Democrația Acasă)

Population (2014 census)
  - Total: 1,746
- Time zone: UTC+2 (EET)
  - Summer (DST): UTC+3 (EEST)
- Postal code: MD-3616

Bușila is a village in Ungheni District, Moldova.
