= Adelina Beljajeva =

Estonian rhythmic gymnast (born 2003)

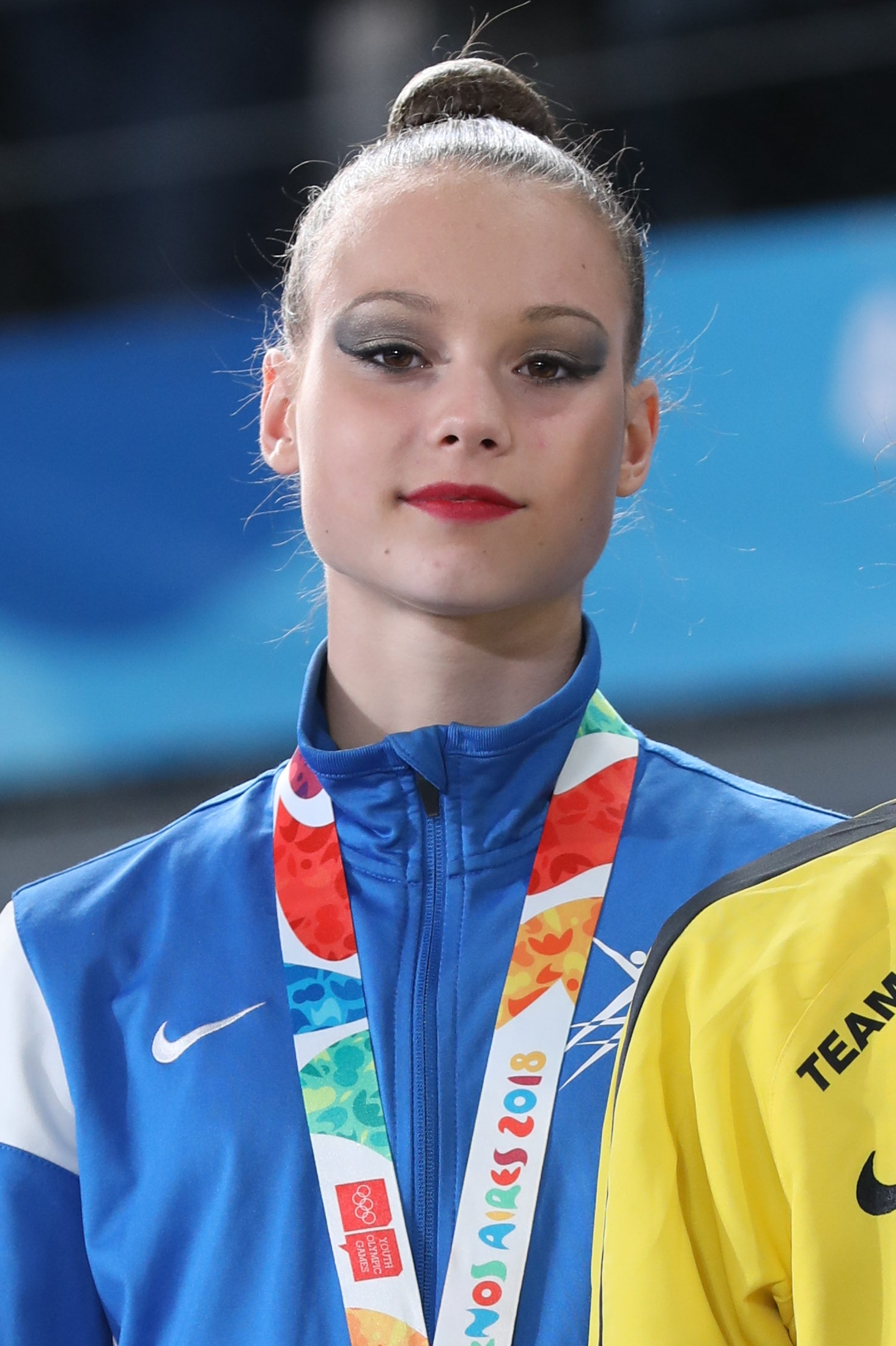
- Born: 17 August 2003 (age 23) Estonia

Gymnastics career
- Discipline: Rhythmic gymnastics
- Country represented: Estonia (2018-2022)
- Club: VK Elegance / Tallinna Spordikool
- Head coaches: Natalja Bestsastnaja, Irina Stadnik
Medal record
Women's rhythmic gymnastics
Representing Estonia
Youth Olympic Games
Silver medal – second place	2018 Buenos Aires	Mixed team

Adelina Beljajeva (born 17 August 2003) is an Estonian rhythmic gymnast, member of the national senior team.

== Personal life ==
Adelina began the sport at age seven. Her idol is Russian rhythmic gymnast Margarita Mamun. Outside the gym she loves watching movies. She speaks English, Estonian and Russian.

== Career ==
=== Junior ===
Beljajeva debuted internationally in 2018, competing at the European Championships in Guadalajara where she ended 9th in teams, 36th in the All-Around, 24th with hoop, 20th ball and 13th with clubs. In October she competed at the Youth Olympic Games in Buenos Aires, finishing 18th in the qualification round and not advancing to the final.

=== Senior ===
Her senior debut was the 2019 World Cup in Pesaro, where she was 48th in the All-Around, 50th with hoop, 49th ball, 61st with clubs and 39th with ribbon. In August she competed at the stage in Minsk taking the 53rd place in the All-Around, 53rd with hoop, 52nd ball, 31st with clubs and 38th with ribbon. Adelina was selected to perform with hoop and clubs at the World Championships in Baku, ending 23rd in teams, 46th with hoop and 50th with clubs.

In 2022 she entered the national group, getting to compete at the 2022 European Championships in Tel Aviv, the group finished 15th in the All-Around, 18th with 5 hoops and 9th with 3 ribbons + 2 balls. In September she participated in the World Championships in Sofia, where she along with teammates Evelin Naptal, Mirtel Korbelainen, Kiara Oja, Arina Okamanchuk, Alina Vesselova was 20th in the All-Around, 15th with 5 hoops and 18th with 3 ribbons + 2 balls.
