= Arina Okamanchuk =

Estonian rhythmic gymnast (born 2002)

- Born: 8 May 2002 (age 24) Tallinn, Estonia
- Height: 170 cm (5 ft 7 in)

Gymnastics career
- Discipline: Rhythmic gymnastics
- Country represented: Estonia (2019-)
- Club: SK Nord
- Head coaches: Natalja Bestsastnaja, Irina Stadnik
Medal record
Representing Estonia
Rhythmic gymnastics
| Event | 1st | 2nd | 3rd |
|---|---|---|---|
| Grand Prix Series | 0 | 1 | 3 |
| European Championships | 0 | 0 | 1 |
| Total | 0 | 1 | 4 |
European Championships
| Bronze medal – third place | 2020 Kyiv | 5 Balls |

Arina Okamanchuk (born 8 May 2002) is an Estonian rhythmic gymnast. She won bronze with 5 balls at the 2020 European Championships.

== Personal life ==
She took up rhythmic gymnastics in 2006 because her mother is a gymnastics' coach. Arina speaks Estonian, English and Russian. Her ambition is to compete at the Olympic Games like her idols Dina and Arina Averina. She stated that "the biggest challenge in gymnastics is overcoming yourself". Outside the gym her hobbies are walking by the sea and reading. She and swimmer Eneli Jefimova received the 2020 Pride of Sport of Sillamae award in Estonia.

== Career ==
Okamanchuk integrated the Estonian national group in 2019, taking part in the World Championships in Baku where the group finished 19th in the All-Around and with 5 balls and 18th with 3 hoops + 4 clubs.

In 2020 the season was cut short due to the COVID-19 pandemic but she competed at the 2020 European Championships in Kyiv, where her and her teammates Laurabell Kabrits, Evelin Naptal, Carmely Reiska and Alina Vesselova made history by winning Estonia's first European medal: bronze in the 5 balls final, behind Ukraine and Israel.

In 2021 Arina took part in the World Championships in Kitakyushu, Japan. The Estonian group made of Arina, Laurabell Kabrits, Evelin Naptal, Carmely Reiska, Alina Vesselova finished 13th in the All-Around and both the routines.

She was selected for the 2022 European Championships in Tel Aviv, the group finished 15th in the All-Around, 18th with 5 hoops and 9th with 3 ribbons + 2 balls. In September she participated in the World Championships in Sofia, where she along with teammates Adelina Beljajeva, Mirtel Korbelainen, Kiara Oja, Evelin Naptal, Alina Vesselova was 20th in the All-Around, 15th with 5 hoops and 18th with 3 ribbons + 2 balls.
