= Mihai Godea =

Moldovan politician

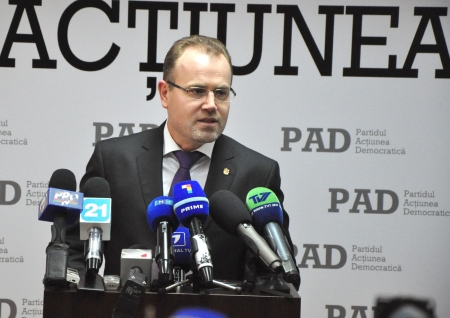
- Godea in 2012

President of the Democratic Action Party
- In office 6 November 2011 – 5 August 2023
- Succeeded by: Arina Spătaru (as President of the Alliance of Liberals and Democrats for Europe)

Member of the Moldovan Parliament
- In office 22 April 2009 – 9 December 2014
- Parliamentary group: Liberal Democratic Party

Personal details
- Born: January 25, 1974 (age 52) Pîrlița, Moldavian SSR, Soviet Union
- Party: Democratic Action Party
- Other political affiliations: Liberal Democratic Party of Moldova (2007-2011); Democratic Party of Moldova (2002-2005); Party of Democratic Forces (2000–2002)
- Children: Two children
- Education: Moldova State University
- Profession: Historian, Lawmaker

Mihai Godea (born 25 January 1974) is a Moldovan politician. He became president of the Democratic Action Party on 6 November 2011.

== Biography ==
After finishing his studies in politics and history, Godea started an activist career in the NGO sector. In 1999 he was appointed as a program coordinator at “CONTACT” National Assistance and Information Center for NGOs in Moldova. Later in 2005, he became the Executive Director of the organization. He engaged in civic activities by being secretary of the Coalition for Rural Economic Development from 2003.

In the following years he became interested in politics. His first contribution to Moldovan political life was his collaboration with Democratic Party of Moldova in 2002. With Alexandru Tanase and Vladimir Filat he founded the Liberal Democratic Action Party in 2007, becoming its vice-president. From 2009 to 2011 he was a member of the Moldovan Parliament of the 17th, 18th, and 19th Legislatures, where he led the PLDM parliamentary fraction. In 2011, he left the PLDM political party to discourage the return of the Communist Party, running unsuccessfully for mayor of Chișinău, Moldova's capital. Despite losing, he contributed substantially to the victory of Dorin Chirtoaca, another pro-European democrat, against the communist candidate, Igor Dodon.

On 6 November 2011, Godea, with Viorel Chivriga, Natalia Ciobanu and Corneliu Gurin, founded the Democratic Action Party, led by Godea.
