= Alliance of Liberals and Democrats for Europe (Moldova) =

Alliance of Liberals and Democrats for Europe Alianța Liberalilor și Democraților pentru Europa
- President: Arina Spătaru
- Founded: 21 July 2011
- Headquarters: 26 Grigore Vieru Boulevard, Chișinău
- Ideology: Social liberalism
- European affiliation: None
- International affiliation: None
- Colours: Pink; Purple
- Parliament: 0 / 101
- District Presidents: 0 / 32

Website
- www.alde.md

The Alliance of Liberals and Democrats for Europe (Romanian: Alianța Liberalilor și Democraților pentru Europa, ALDE) is a liberal political party in Moldova.

== History ==
The PAD was founded in 2011 by ex-member of the Liberal Democratic Party Mihai Godea. The party was founded as the social movement Alternative Democratic Platform. The founding congress took place on 6 November 2011 in Chișinău. Godea was elected as chairman of the new party. Previously, it was known as the Democratic Action Party.

On 25 June 2025, Adrian Culai, then ALDE's former secretary, was sentenced to four years in prison for knowingly accepting funding for a political party from an organized criminal group, having pleaded guilty. Between late June and late August 2023, Culai received some 452,700 dollars (around 8 million lei) from the group of Moldovan pro-Russian fugitive oligarch Ilan Shor. On 8 August, Mihail Bagas, who mediated the transfer of the money from Shor's group to Culai, pleaded guilty as well.

In a Ziarul de Gardă podcast published on 6 April that year, Arina Spătaru, then leader of the ALDE, had stated she had acted as an undercover agent within Shor's group, with Shor having allegedly asked her to create a party with a pro-European profile, with the aim of controlling it for his own interests. Spătaru stated that she traveled to Israel and met with Shor to gather evidence, that she simulated the takeover of the party from Godea under coordination from the investigation team and renamed it to the ALDE and that Culai and Bagas were sent by Shor to help her take control of the party.

On 13 August, the National Moldovan Party (PNM) filed a complaint to the Central Electoral Commission of Moldova (CEC) requesting the dissolution of the ALDE based on Culai's case. The PNM claimed to have compelling evidence of the involvement of Shor's group in the party's financing and control. Spătaru rejected the accusations and stated that the party collaborated with the Moldovan authorities in the summer of 2023 to document Shor's group's illegal party financing scheme. As a result of this investigation, Shor-affiliated parliament member Alexandr Nesterovschi was sentenced to 12 years in prison.

== Election results ==
=== Parliament ===
Election	Leader	Performance					Rank	Government
Election	Leader	Votes	%	± pp	Seats	+/–	Rank	Government
2014	Mihai Godea	2,564	0.16%	New	0 / 101	New	15th	Extra-parliamentary
2019	Did not contest							Extra-parliamentary
2021	Did not contest							Extra-parliamentary
2025	Arina Spătaru	3,576	0.23%	▲0.07	0 / 101	0	▲12th	Extra-parliamentary
