= Dead Blonde =

Russian singer (born 1999)

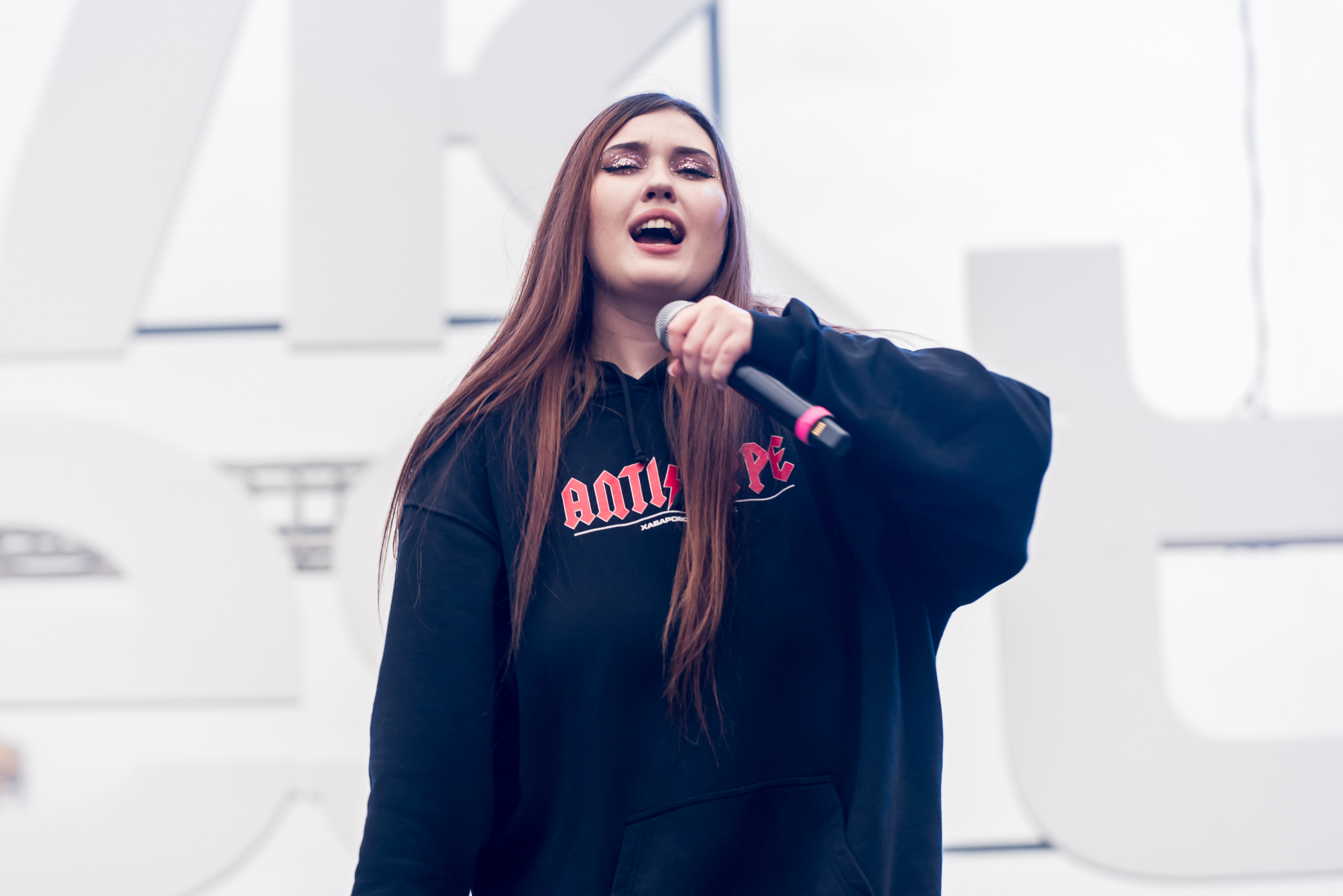
- Dead Blonde on VK Fest 2022

Background information
- Born: Arina Nikolaevna Murasheva; 6 April 1999 (age 27); Arkhangelsk, Russia
- Origin: Russia
- Genres: Rave pop, synthwave, Eurobeat
- Occupations: Musician, DJ
- Years active: 2020–present
- Website: https://www.arinadeadblonde.ru/

Dead Blonde is a Russian rave solo band led by Arina Nikolaevna Murasheva (born 6 April 1999). The band gained notoriety with the songs "Мальчик на девятке" (Boy in a Samara) and "Бесприданница" (Girl Without a Dowry), which became popular on Russian TikTok.

== Early life ==
Arina was born on 6 April, 1999 in Arkhangelsk, and grew up in Solombala. She studied at the Academy of the Investigative Committee in St. Petersburg, but left to pursue her musical career.

== Career ==
Initially, Arina was the producer of the rave project GSPD. Currently with this, she is a backing vocalist and DJ at their concerts.

On 7 January 2020, David Deimour of GSPD and Arina launched the Dead Blonde rave project. On 30 April of the same year, her debut studio album "PROPAGANDA" was released. This album included the single "Back to School" which was released on 14 February.

On 25 September 2020, the single "Between Panel Houses", and on 6 October, a remix of the song by Hotzzen was released.

In late April to early May 2021, the song "Boy on a Nine" became popular on TikTok in Russia. This was followed by the song hitting the charts on YouTube, iTunes, Apple Music and Spotify. On 18 May, a remix of the same song by GSPD was released.

On 2 July 2021, her second album "Princess from a Khrushchevka" was released. And at the end of October of the same year, she gave her first solo concerts in Moscow and St. Petersburg.

== Personal life ==
She is married to David Deimour of GSPD.

== Discography ==
=== Studio albums ===
List of albums
| Name | Details | Top position in the charts | | |
| Name | Details | Apple Music Russia | Apple Music Ukraine | iTunes Ukraine |
|---|---|---|---|---|
| "ПРОПАГАНДА" (PROPAGANDA) | Release date: 30 April 2020; Label: out of label; Format: CD, streaming, lathe-cut, audio cassette | 6 | 1 | 11 |
| "Княжна из хрущёвки" (Princess from a Khrushchevka) | Release date: 2 July 2021 | 11 | 8 | |
| "СПЛЕТНИЦА" (GOSSIP GIRL) | 18 November 2022 | | | |
| "ПЕРЕСТРОЙКА" (RECONSTRUCTION) | Release date: 5 April 2024 | | | |
| "ДЕЛО МЁРТВОЙ БЛОНДИНКИ" (CASE OF THE DEAD BLONDE) | Release date: 29 May 2026 | | | |

=== Singles ===
As Lead Performer
| Year | Name | Album | Top position in the charts | | | | | | |
| Year | Name | Album | Latvia Spotify | Russia iTunes | Russia Apple Music | Russia Spotify | Ukraine iTunes | Ukraine Spotify | Ukraine Apple Music |
|---|---|---|---|---|---|---|---|---|---|
| 2020 | "Back to School" | ПРОПАГАНДА | – | – | – | – | – | – | – |
| 2020 | "Между панельных домов" (Between Panel Houses) | Княжна из хрущёвки | – | – | – | – | – | – | – |
| 2020 | "Между панельных домов" (Between Panel Houses) (Hotzzen Remix) | Off-album single | – | – | – | – | – | – | – |
| 2021 | "Бесприданница" (Girl Without a Dowry) | Княжна из хрущёвки | 138 | 39 | – | 10 | 46 | 9 | 15 |
| 2021 | "Моя младшая сестра" (My Little Sister) (Featuring CM) | Off-album single | – | – | – | 145 | – | – | – |
| 2021 | "Мальчик на девятке" (Boy in a Samara) (GSPD Remix) | Off-album single | – | 117 | – | – | 56 | – | – |
| 2022 | "Не такая, как все" (Not like Everyone Else) | СПЛЕТНИЦА | – | – | – | – | – | – | – |
| 2022 | "Ту-лу-ла" (Tu-la-la) | СПЛЕТНИЦА | – | – | – | – | – | – | – |
| 2022 | "Всего лишь друг" (Just a friend) | СПЛЕТНИЦА | – | – | – | – | – | – | – |
| 2022 | "Всего лишь друг" (Just a friend) (GSPD Remix) | Off-album single | – | – | – | – | – | – | – |
| 2022 | "Без шансов" (No chance) (by DEAD BLONDE and Vintage) | СПЛЕТНИЦА | – | – | – | – | – | – | – |
| 2023 | "Моника Беллуччи" (Monica Bellucci) | Off-album single | – | – | – | – | – | – | |
| 2024 | "Снег растаял на плечах" (The Snow Melted On My Shoulders) | ПЕРЕСТРОЙКА | – | – | – | – | – | – | |
| 2024 | "Снег растаял на плечах" (The Snow Melted On My Shoulders) (GSPD Remix) | Off-album single | – | – | – | – | – | – | |
| 2024 | "Детка Киллер" (Killer Baby) | ПЕРЕСТРОЙКА | – | – | – | – | – | – | |
| 2024 | "Питер город криминала" (St. Petersburg Is a City Of Crime) | ПЕРЕСТРОЙКА | – | – | – | – | – | – | |
| 2024 | "Розовая иномарка" (Pink Foreign Car) | Off-album single | – | – | – | – | – | – | – |
| 2024 | "Moscow Nights" | Off-album single | – | – | – | – | – | – | – |
| 2025 | "ОТТЕПЕЛЬ" (HEAT) (DEAD BLONDE and GSPD) | Off-album single | – | – | – | – | – | – | – |
| 2025 | "Не забывай свои мечты" (Don't Forget Your Dreams) | Off-album single | – | – | – | – | – | – | – |
| 2026 | "Заветное желание" (Cherished Wish) | "ДЕЛО МЁРТВОЙ БЛОНДИНКИ" (CASE OF THE DEAD BLONDE) | – | – | – | – | – | – | |
| 2026 | "Казино" (Casino) | "ДЕЛО МЁРТВОЙ БЛОНДИНКИ" (CASE OF THE DEAD BLONDE) | – | – | – | – | – | – | – |

As Guest Performer
| Year | Name | Album |
|---|---|---|
| 2020 | "No hope, no God, no hip-hop" (Slava KPSS and Antihype, Waste Paper, Chaliapin's Hat, GSPD, DEAD BLONDE, Lenin Packet, THE LP) | Monster that ruined the world |
| 2021 | "Russia has three paths" (GSPD and Dead Blonde) | Off-album single |
| 2021 | Neon sky – Rework 2021 (GSPD and Dead Blonde) | Old songs about the main thing |
| 2022 | Il ragazzo con la giardinetta – BIONDA MORTA per CIAO 2021 | CIAO 2021 |
| 2022 | Everlasting summer (SMN, GSPD and DEAD BLONDE) | MUDBLOOD |
| 2022 | Space (Slava KPSS and DEAD BLONDE) | Mixtape |
| 2023 | TEACH BAD (GSPD and DEAD BLONDE) | SPORT MODE: Red Light |
| 2023 | LOSING YOU (GSPD and DEAD BLONDE) | SPORT MODE: Green Light |
| 2023 | Grownups (prosto Lera and DEAD BLONDE) | Off-album single |
| 2023 | Стюардесса по имени Жанна | 1993% XИTOB |
| 2025 | Beverly Hills (Мэйби Бэйби & DEAD BLONDE) | Off-album single |

== Awards and nominations ==
| Year | Prize | Result | Notes |
|---|---|---|---|
| 2021 | MTV Музыкант года 2021 | Win | |
