= Arina Spătaru =

Moldovan businesswoman and politician

President of the Alliance of Liberals and Democrats for Europe
- Incumbent
- Assumed office 5 August 2023
- Preceded by: Mihai Godea (as President of the Democratic Action Party)

Member of the Moldovan Parliament
- In office 9 March 2019 – 23 July 2021
- Parliamentary group: Dignity and Truth Platform

Personal details
- Born: 10 October 1978 (age 47) Bălți, Moldavian SSR, Soviet Union
- Party: Alliance of Liberals and Democrats; Dignity and Truth Platform Party (2015-2021)
- Education: Alecu Russo State University of Bălți

Arina Spătaru (born 10 October 1978) is a Moldovan businesswoman and politician who served as a member of the Moldovan Parliament from 2019 and 2021.

== Early life and education ==
Spătaru graduated from the College of Light Industry in 1998, with a degree in modelling and fashion design. She graduated from the Faculty of Economics of the Dniester Institute of Economics and Law, and in 2018 received a master's degree from the Faculty of Real, Economic and Environmental Sciences of the Alecu Russo State University of Bălți, with a degree in industrial technologies.

== Business career ==
From 2003 to 2011, Spătaru worked as a patent-based entrepreneur, owning a tailoring workshop, on the basis of which she founded the company Arina - S SRL. She ran the company from 2011 until March 2019, when, with her election to Parliament, the business passed to her husband.

== Political career ==
=== Member of PPDA (2015-2021) ===
In December 2015, Spătaru entered politics, being elected president of the Balti Territorial Organization of the Dignity and Truth Platform Party. In 2017, she became a member of the party's Permanent Political Bureau. She withdrew from the political bureau in September 2019, claiming that her views were not taken into account in the political party.

Bălți candidacy in 2018

Spătaru ran on behalf of this party for the position of mayor of Balti in 2018 and accumulated 6.25%, losing to Nicolai Grigorișin.

In parliament

In the 2019 parliamentary elections, Spătaru ran in both the national constituency and the constituency no. 10 Bălți from the NOW Platform DA and PAS, of which her party was a part. In Bălți, she was overtaken by the PN and PSRM candidates, but eventually became a deputy on the party list. In parliament, she was a member of the "NOW PLATFORM YES" faction and was a member of the Public Administration Committee.

Departure

On 16 September 2021, Spătaru resigned as a member of the DA Platform and stated that "I don't know why I decided then to literally stay in a swamp until the end."

=== Independent politician (2021-present) ===
Bălți candidacy in 2021

In the Bălți local elections, held on 21 November 2021, Arina Spătaru attempted to run for mayor of Bălți, but she did not meet the required number of signatures and thus was not registered in the elections. She boycotted the local elections, urging supporters not to go to the polls. She was also a third party in the process of excluding Marina Tauber from the elections, advocating the exclusion of the Șor Party candidate on 3 and 4 December.

== Personal life ==
Spătaru is married to Anatolie Spătaru, a priest at a church in Bălți. The couple have three sons.
