= Ungheni, Iași =

Ungheni
- Commune
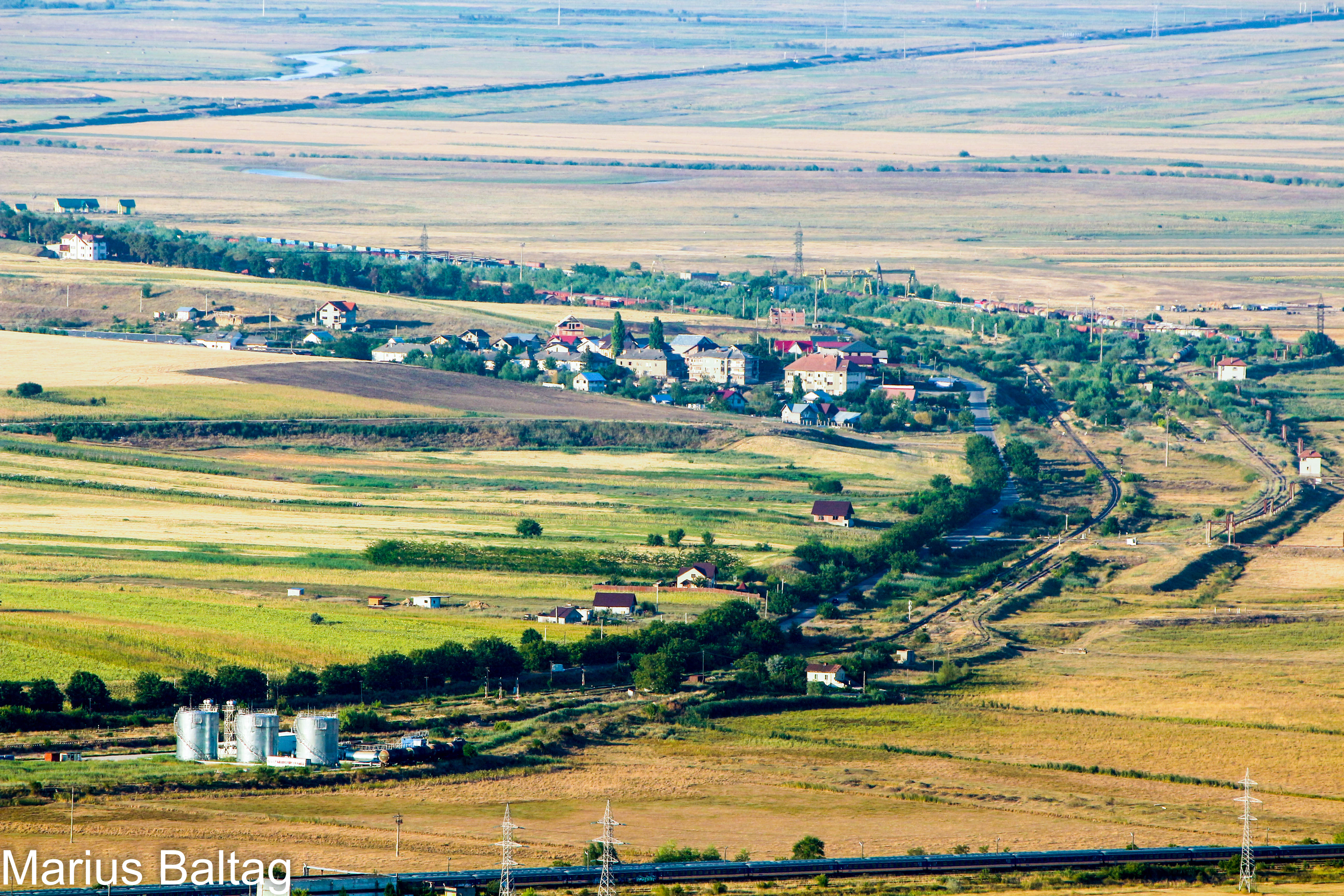

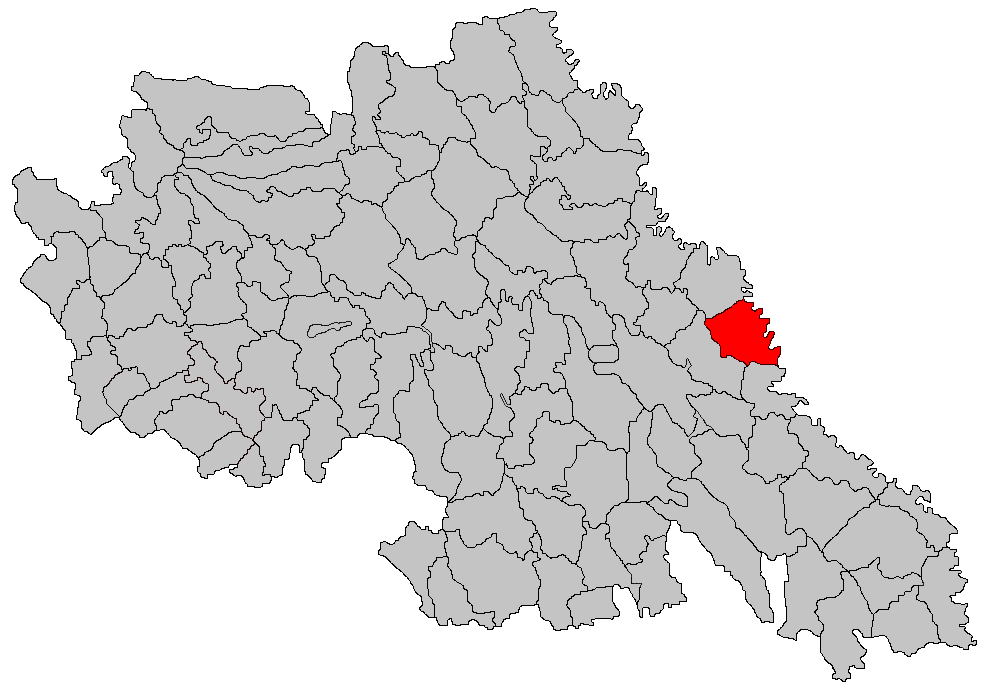
- Location in Iași County

- Location in Romania
- Coordinates: 47°12′50″N 27°45′50″E
- Country: Romania
- County: Iași
- Subdivisions: Ungheni, Coada Stâncii, Mânzătești, Ungheni

Government
  - Mayor (2024–2028): Iulian Marcu (PNL)
- Area: 41.62 km^{2} (16.07 sq mi)
- Elevation: 37 m (121 ft)
- Population (2021-12-01): 3,582
  - Density: 86.06/km^{2} (222.9/sq mi)
- Time zone: UTC+02:00 (EET)
  - Summer (DST): UTC+03:00 (EEST)
- Postal code: 707566
- Area code: +40 x32
- Vehicle reg.: IS
- Website: comunaungheni.ro

Ungheni (called Bosia until 1996) is a commune in Iași County, Western Moldavia, in eastern Romania, part of the Iași metropolitan area. It is composed of four villages: Bosia (the commune center), Coada Stâncii, Mânzătești and Ungheni.

There is a bridge across the Prut and a border checkpoint to Moldova. There is another border town with the same name in the Republic of Moldova (Ungheni), on the other side of the Prut River.

== Gallery ==
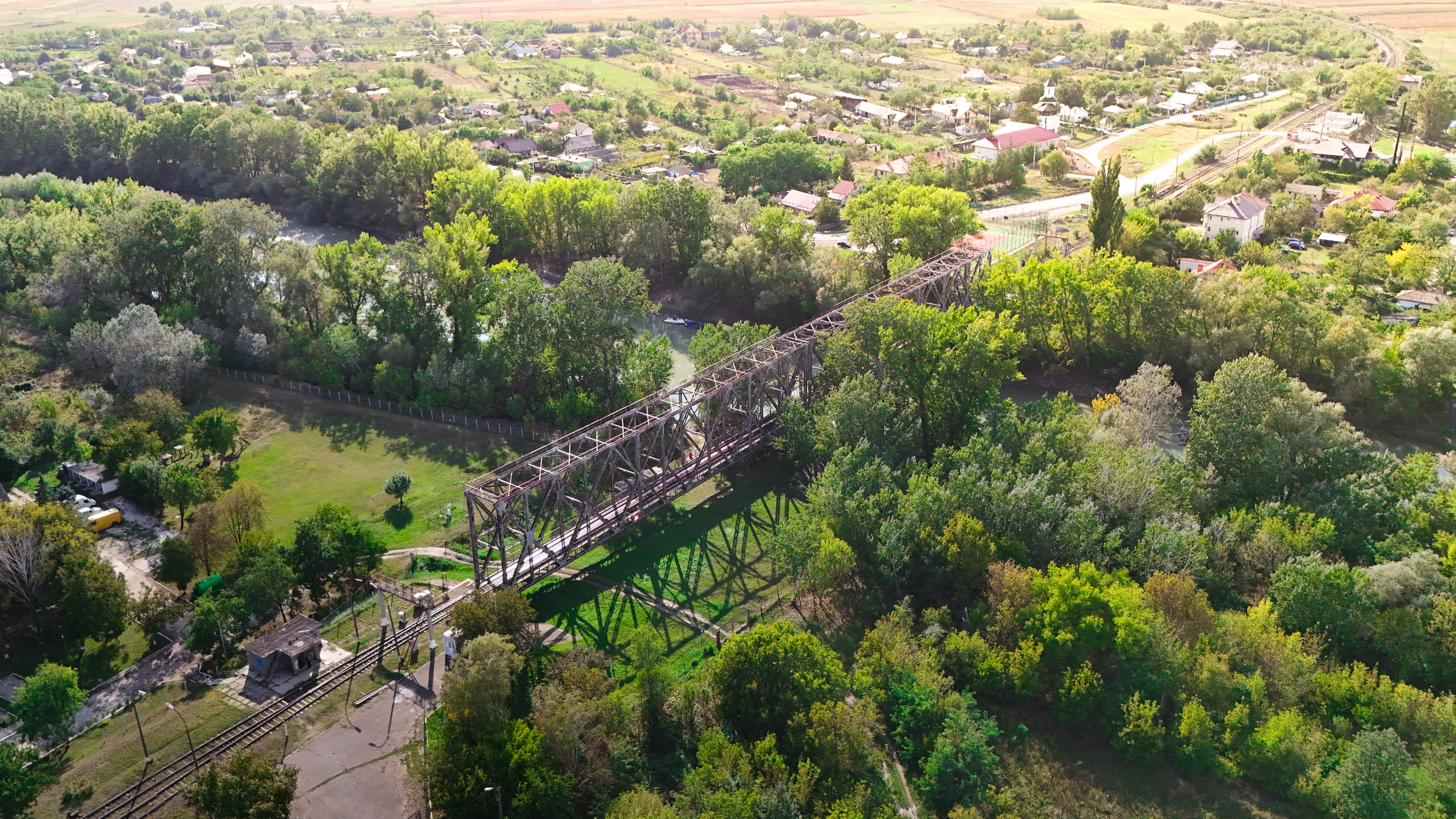
Eiffel Bridge, Ungheni
