= Vasile Vasilache =

Moldovan writer

Vasile Vasilache OR
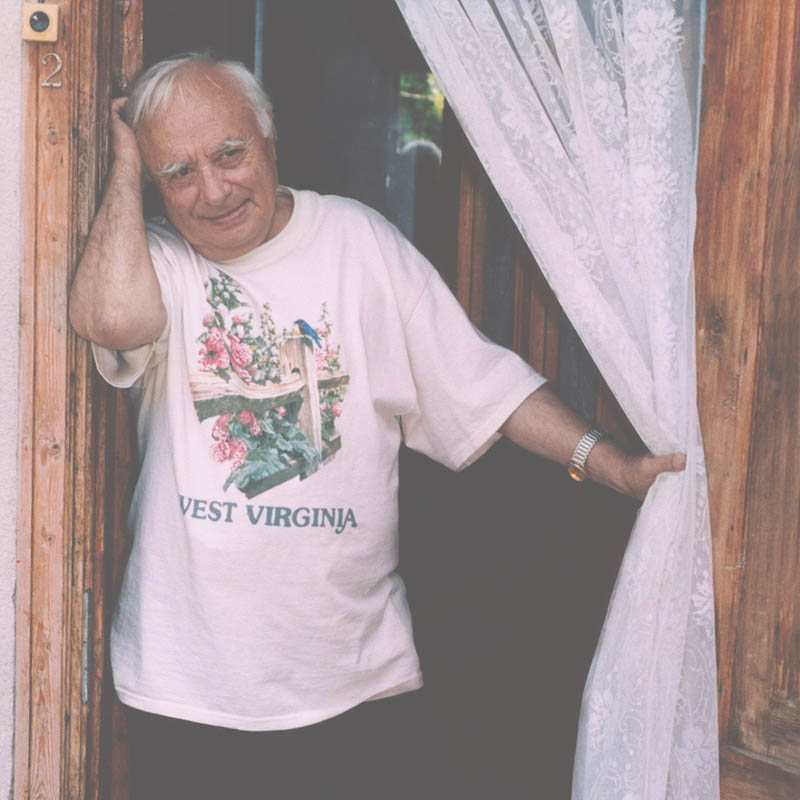
- Born: 4 July 1926; Unţeşti, Kingdom of Romania
- Died: 7 July 2008 (aged 82); Chişinău, Moldova
- Resting place: Chişinău
- Education: University of Bucharest
- Awards: Order of the Republic (Moldova)

Vasile Vasilache (4 July 1926 – 7 July 2008) was a writer from Moldova.

Vasile Vasilache was born to Ion and Elizabeta Vasilache on 4 July 1926 in Unţeşti. In 1965 he became a member of the Moldovan Writers' Union. Vasile Vasilache died on 7 July 2008 and was buried in the Central Cemetery on Armeneasca street in Chişinău.

Vasile Vasilache has been a refined intellectual, a soul fascinated by everything meaning authentic culture, a distinct friend, discreet and elegant, who has always radiated spiritual warmth.

the writer Serafim Saca said in tears at Vasilache's funeral. The Moldovan Writers' Union president Mihai Cimpoi has said that Vasile Vasilache has left a wide gap in Moldova's culture.

== Awards ==
- Order of the Republic (Moldova) (1996), highest state distinction
- „Insigna de Onoare” (1986)
- Premiul Naţional pentru literatură (1994),
- „Opera Omnia” al Uniunii Scriitorilor din Moldova.
- Premiat pentru scenariul documentar "Eu şi ceilalti...", Riga, 1969

== Works ==
- Trişca” (1961),
- „Două mere ţigance” (1964),
- „Tăcerile casei aceleia” (1970),
- „Elegie pentru Ana-Maria” (1983),
- „Mama-mare, profesoară de istorie” (1989),
- „Navetista şi pădurea” (1989),
- „Surâsul lui Vişnu” (1993)
- „Povestea cu cocoşul roşu” (1996),
