= Arina Sharapova =

Russian TV presenter and journalist (born 1961)

- Арина Шарапова
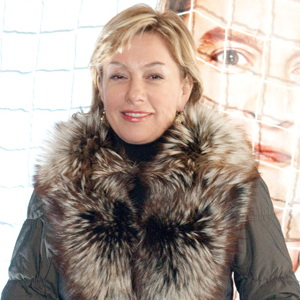
- Born: 30 May 1961 (age 65); Moscow, Russian SFSR, Soviet Union
- Arina Sharpova's voice Sharpova on the Echo of Moscow program, 27 September 2014

Arina Ayanovna Sharapova (Russian: Ари́на Ая́новна Шара́пова; born 30 May 1961) is a Russian TV presenter, journalist and head of the workshop of journalism of the Moscow Institute of Television and Radio Broadcasting Ostankino.

In 1997 and 2002 she announced the results of the Russian jury's voting at the Eurovision Song Contest.

During the 2013 Moscow mayoral election she was a trustee of the candidate Sergei Sobyanin.

She is a member of the Public Council under the Ministry of Internal Affairs of the Russian Federation.

Son Danila Sharapov (born June 7, 1981), media manager, TV producer.

== Public activity ==
Sharapova was a member of the Public Council under the Ministry of Internal Affairs of the Russian Federation. She is a full member of the Imperial Orthodox Palestine Society.

Sharapova was Sergey Sobyanin's confidant in the 2013 Moscow mayoral election.

Since April 2016, Sharapova is Deputy Chairman of the Public Chamber of Moscow.

In September 2016, Sharapova became a trusted representative of the United Russia party in the 2016 Russian legislative election.

Sharapova is a member of the Public Council under the Ministry of Defense of the Russian Federation.

In 2024, she became an authorized representative of Russian presidential candidate Vladimir Putin.
