= Arina Sobakina =

Russian ballerina and stage actress

Arina Matveyevna Sobakina
- Born: Arina Matveyevna Sobakina; Арина Матвеевна Собакина c. 1762; Moscow, Russian Empire
- Occupations: ballerina and stage actress

Arina Matveyevna Sobakina (circa 1762 – date of death unknown), was a Russian ballerina and stage actress performing as a "comic dancer". She belonged to the pioneer group of professional stage artists in Russia.

== Biography ==
She was from an orphanage in Moscow and trained as a ballet dancer by the imperial ballet master Leopold Paradise from Vienna, which was not an uncommon background for a Russian stage artist in this period. Leopold Paradise joined the Foster House in 1778, and in 1780 he released the first students of his ballet class - seven dancers and nine dancers, among whom was Arina Sobakina.

Arina Sobakina was sent to St. Petersburg to Karl Knipper Theatre. This theater was opened by Karl Knipper, the doctor of the Foster house. Since there were not enough artists in Russia yet, he signed a contract with the Foster House to supply it with its graduates of the stage classes. Arina Sobakina, having got to the Knipper Theatre, immediately became the main comic dancer on this stage. In 1782, Ivan Dmitrevsky joined the theater. He not only headed the staging works, but also conducted acting lessons. Arina Sobakina worked in the theater under his leadership. However, the theater experienced problems because of the extremely unsatisfactory attitude of the host to the cast. As a result, the Foster House stopped supplying young artists for the theater and soon the theater ceased to exist.

On September 1, 1783, the freelance theater was included into the structure of the imperial theaters. Part of the troupe was sent to Moscow. In this last group, sent back to Moscow, was Arina Sobakina. By that time, a public theatre had also appeared in Moscow. In 1780 it was opened on Petrovka Street by Michael Maddox, an English businessman and engineer. It was named the Bolshoi Petrovsky Theatre (from which today's Bolshoi Theatre originated). Arina Sobakina also moved to the theatre. French and Italian artists worked there as choreographers and directors, but the ballet company was mainly composed of Russian artists, the graduates of the orphanage, where they were specially trained. The repertoire of the Moscow troupe was more liberal and was intended not only for the high-society public. It included many comic ballets and domestic genre scenes, close to the creativeness of Sobakina. In 1784-1785 she was one of the leading actresses of the Petrovsky Theatre. The main partner was Gavrila Raikov, her co-worker and another main actor in the ballet troupe of the Bolshoi Theatre.

== Sources ==
- Vsevolodsky V. (Gerngross)., History of theatrical education in Russia. - — Т. 1. - St. Petersburg, 1913.
- Krasovskaya V., Russian Ballet Theatre from the beginning to the middle of the 19th century. - L.-M., 1958.
