= Cornești (town), Ungheni =

Cornești
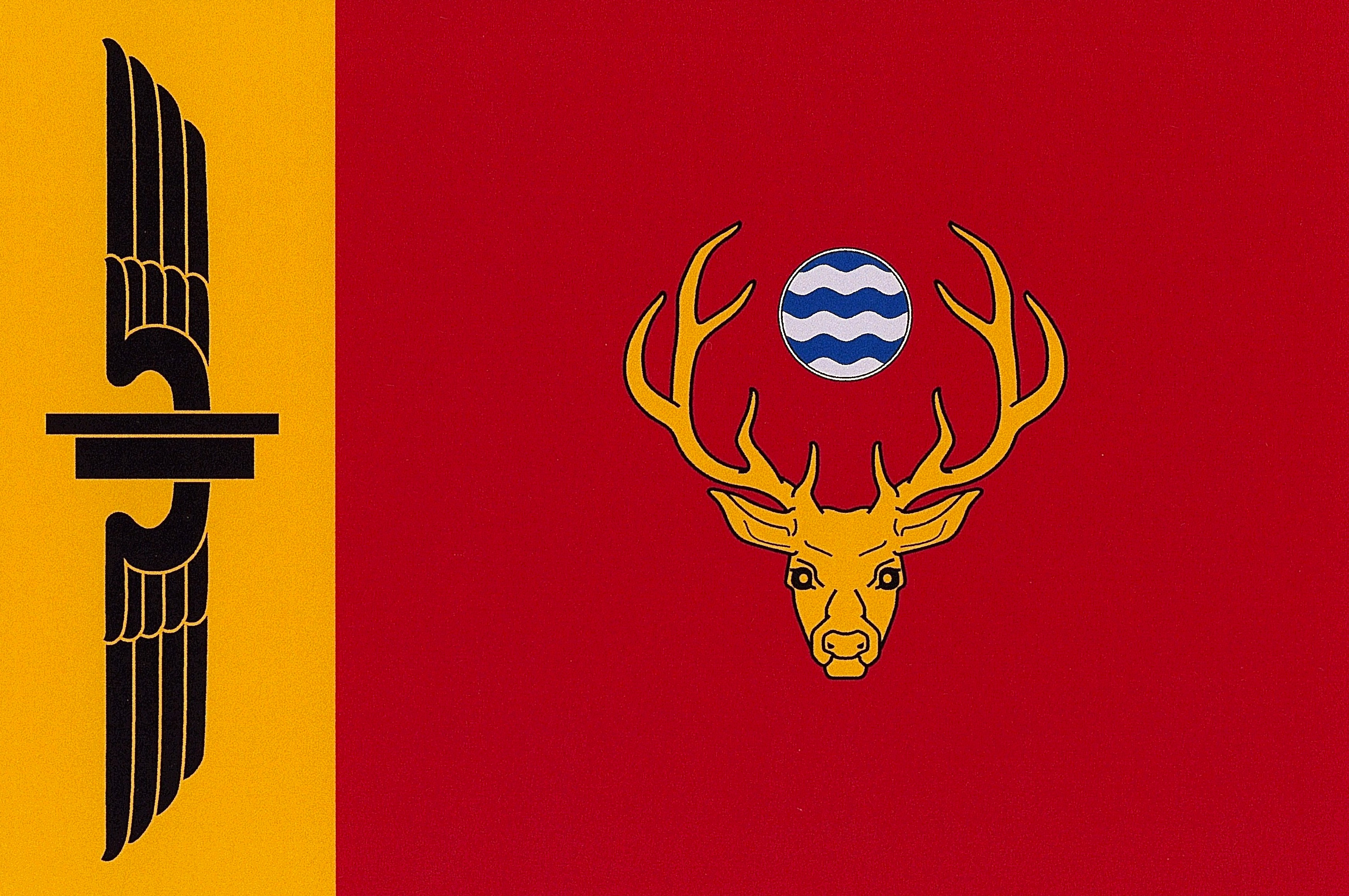
- Flag

- Location in Moldova
- Coordinates: 47°21′22″N 28°0′30″E
- Country: Moldova
- District: Ungheni District

Population (2014)
  - Total: 2,470
- Time zone: UTC+2 (EET)
  - Summer (DST): UTC+3 (EEST)
- Postal code: MD-3608
- Area code: 236
- Website: orasulcornesti.com

Cornești (Romanian pronunciation: [korˈneʃtʲ]) is a town (oraș) in Ungheni district, in central Moldova, with a population of 3,284 at the 2004 census. It is composed of the town itself, population 2,781, and the village Romanovca, population 503.

== History ==
The Chișinău-Cornești railway was built between 1871 and 1873. On June 1, 1875, the line Cornești-Ungheni was opened and connection to Romania was established. During the interwar period, the town was the seat of Plasa Cornești, in Bălți County, Romania.

== Climate ==
Climate data for Cornești, Moldova (1991–2020, extremes 1945–present)
Month	Jan	Feb	Mar	Apr	May	Jun	Jul	Aug	Sep	Oct	Nov	Dec	Year
Record high °C (°F)	16.1 (61.0)	20.4 (68.7)	25.6 (78.1)	30.6 (87.1)	34.2 (93.6)	38.0 (100.4)	39.9 (103.8)	40.6 (105.1)	37.0 (98.6)	31.9 (89.4)	25.4 (77.7)	17.5 (63.5)	40.6 (105.1)
Mean daily maximum °C (°F)	0.9 (33.6)	3.1 (37.6)	9.0 (48.2)	16.4 (61.5)	22.2 (72.0)	25.8 (78.4)	27.9 (82.2)	27.8 (82.0)	22.0 (71.6)	15.1 (59.2)	7.9 (46.2)	2.4 (36.3)	15.0 (59.0)
Daily mean °C (°F)	−2.2 (28.0)	−0.6 (30.9)	4.2 (39.6)	10.8 (51.4)	16.3 (61.3)	20.0 (68.0)	21.9 (71.4)	21.7 (71.1)	16.3 (61.3)	10.3 (50.5)	4.5 (40.1)	−0.6 (30.9)	10.2 (50.4)
Mean daily minimum °C (°F)	−4.8 (23.4)	−3.5 (25.7)	0.3 (32.5)	6.0 (42.8)	11.0 (51.8)	14.7 (58.5)	16.6 (61.9)	16.3 (61.3)	11.5 (52.7)	6.4 (43.5)	1.7 (35.1)	−3.2 (26.2)	6.1 (43.0)
Record low °C (°F)	−27.1 (−16.8)	−25.2 (−13.4)	−17.7 (0.1)	−9.3 (15.3)	−1.8 (28.8)	4.3 (39.7)	7.7 (45.9)	5.0 (41.0)	−3.3 (26.1)	−6.7 (19.9)	−16.5 (2.3)	−25.1 (−13.2)	−27.1 (−16.8)
Average precipitation mm (inches)	36 (1.4)	34 (1.3)	43 (1.7)	47 (1.9)	62 (2.4)	85 (3.3)	77 (3.0)	49 (1.9)	55 (2.2)	47 (1.9)	44 (1.7)	42 (1.7)	621 (24.4)
Average precipitation days (≥ 1.0 mm)	8	7	7	7	9	8	8	5	6	6	6	7	83
Average relative humidity (%)	81	80	74	65	64	68	68	66	70	75	82	84	73
Source 1: NOAA
Source 2: Serviciul Hidrometeorologic de Stat (extremes, relative humidity)
