= Carmely Reiska =

Estonian rhythmic gymnast

- Born: 8 August 2002 (age 24) Tallinn, Estonia

Gymnastics career
- Discipline: Rhythmic gymnastics
- Country represented: Estonia; (2016–2021)
- Club: SK Nord / Tallinna Spordikool
- Head coach: Natalja Bestsastnaja
Medal record
Representing Estonia
Rhythmic gymnastics
Event	1st	2nd	3rd
European Championships	0	0	1
FIG World Cup	0	0	1
Grand Prix series	0	1	3
Total	0	1	5
European Championships
Bronze medal – third place	2020 Kyiv	5 balls

Carmely Reiska (born 8 August 2002) is an Estonian rhythmic gymnast.

== Career ==
=== Junior ===
From 2016 to 2017, Reiska was a member of the Estonian junior group, winning two Estonian group championship in 2016 and 2017, and from the end of 2017 until December 2021 she trained as part of the national senior group. She competed at the 2017 Rhythmic Gymnastics European Championships in Budapest, Hungary, with the Estonian junior group, placing 7th in All-Around and also in the 10 clubs final.

=== Senior ===
Reiska competed at the 2018 Rhythmic Gymnastics European Championships in Guadalajara, Spain. She also participated in the 2018 Rhythmic Gymnastics World Championships in Sofia, Bulgaria, placing 13th in the all-around competition. She won silver in the 3 balls + 2 ropes final and bronze with 5 hoops at the 2018 Grand Prix stage in Holon, Israel. Reiska was also part of the Estonian group which earned the nation's first-ever FIG World Cup medal, a bronze medal in the group all-around competition at the Tashkent World Cup in 2018, along with teammates Helena Jaee, Vasilina Kuksova, Maria Susi, Lera Teino and Maria Trofimov.

In 2019, she participated in the European Games in Minsk, Belarus, where she finished 7th overall with her group. That same year, she also earned the bronze medal with the group 5 balls routine at the Thiais Grand Prix stage. In 2020, Reiska was part of the group that won Estonia their first-ever medal at the Rhythmic Gymnastics European Championships, getting bronze in the 5 balls final. In 2021, she competed at the World Championships in Kitakyushu, Japan, finishing 13th in the group all-around competition. Reiska, with the Estonian group, earned the bronze medal in the 5 balls final at the 2021 Moscow Grand Prix stage.

== Personal life ==
Reiska took up rhythmic gymnastics at age four, encouraged by her mother. She graduated from the Kadriorg German Gymnasium in 2021. She earned her Bachelor's degree in Computer Science from the University of Konstanz, Germany, in 2025 and is currently pursuing her Master's degree.

Reiska can speak four languages: Estonian, German, English, and Russian.
