= Lopatnic (river) =

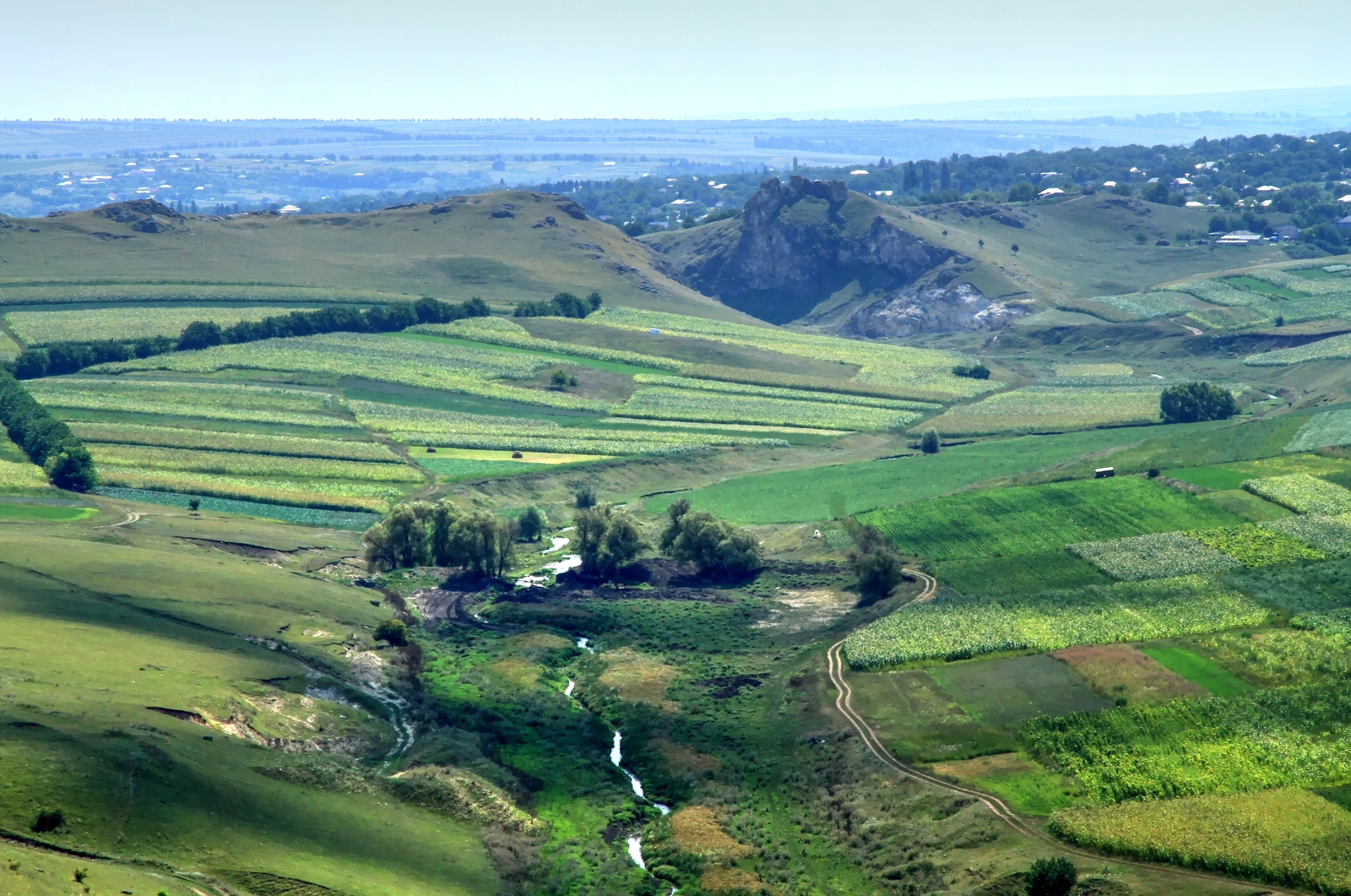

Location
- Country: Ukraine, Moldova

Physical characteristics
- Mouth
  - location: Prut at Lopatnic
  - coordinates: 48.1301°N 27.0399°E
- Length: 57 km (35 mi)

Basin features
- Progression: Prut→ Danube→ Black Sea

The Lopatnic is a 57 km (35 mi) long left tributary of the river Prut in western Ukraine and northern Moldova. Its source is near the village Hrubna (Dniester Raion, Chernivtsi Oblast, Ukraine). After a few kilometers, it crosses into Moldova. It flows through the villages Grimăncăuți, Briceni, Tabani, Caracușenii Vechi and Corjeuți, and it discharges into the Prut near the village Lopatnic, on the border with Romania.
