= Racovăț (Prut) =

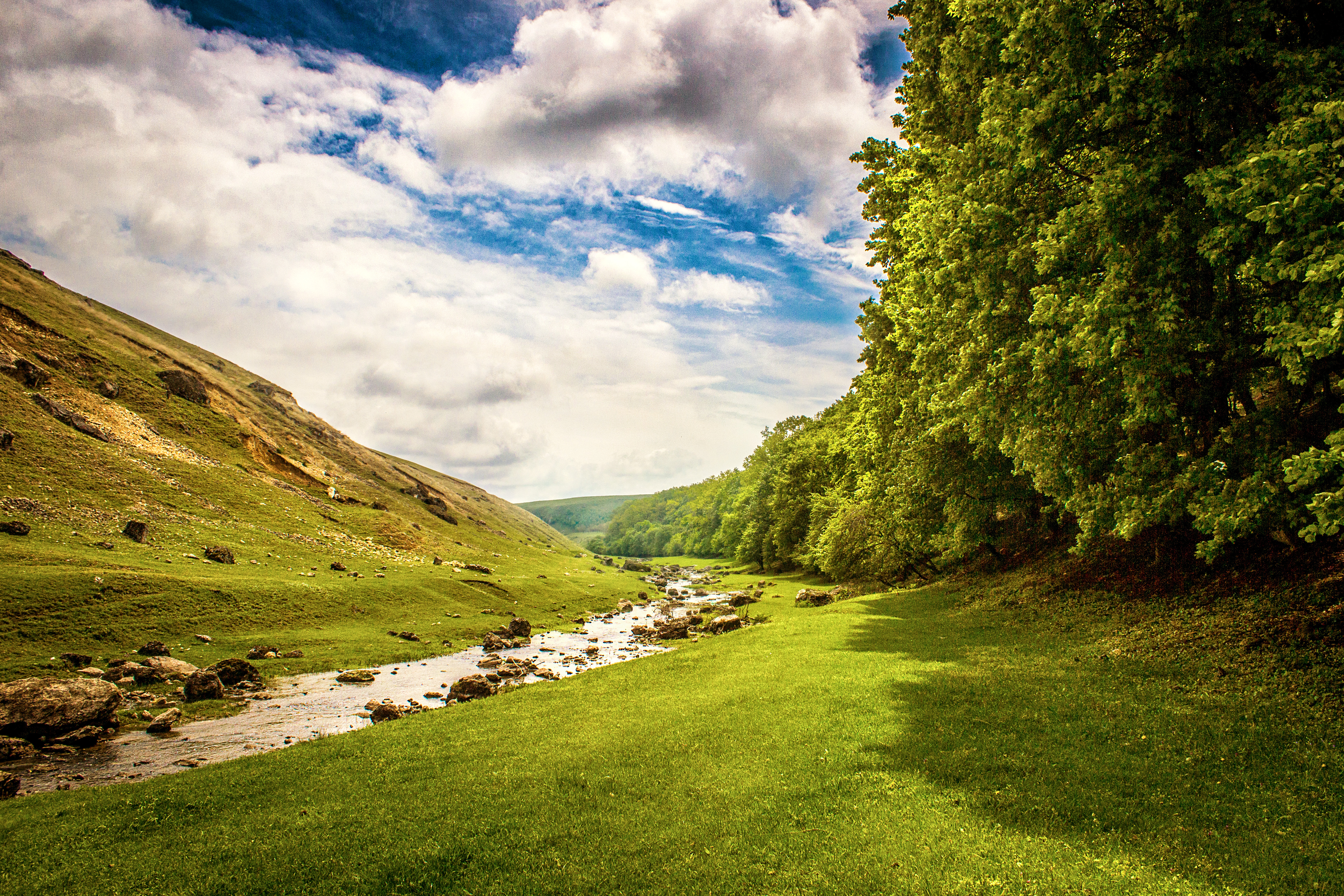

Location
- Country: Ukraine, Moldova

Physical characteristics
- Mouth
  - location: Prut at Corpaci
  - coordinates: 48.0124°N 27.1321°E
- Length: 67 km (42 mi)

Basin features
- Progression: Prut→ Danube→ Black Sea
- Tributaries
  - right: Draghiște

The Racovăț or Rakovets (Ukrainian: Раковець) is a 67 km (42 mi) long left tributary of the river Prut in western Ukraine and northern Moldova. Its source is near the village of Hvizdivtsi (Dniester Raion, Chernivtsi Oblast, Ukraine). After a few kilometers, it crosses into Moldova. It flows through the villages Clocușna, Hădărăuți, Corestăuți, Marcăuți, Bălcăuți, Halahora de Sus, Tîrnova, Gordinești and Brînzeni, and it discharges into the Prut near the village Corpaci, on the border with Romania. Its largest tributary is the Draghiște, which flows into the Racovăț near Brînzeni.
