= Criva =

Criva may refer to several places in Romania:

- Criva, a village in Vârvoru de Jos Commune, Dolj County
- Criva, a village in Densuş Commune, Hunedoara County
- Criva de Jos and Criva de Sus, villages in Piatra Olt town, Olt County
- Criva, a tributary of the Timiș in Caraș-Severin County

and a village in Moldova:

- Criva, a commune in Briceni district
