= Trestieni =

Trestieni may refer to several villages in Romania:

- Trestieni, a village in Pârscov Commune, Buzău County
- Trestieni, a village in Ulmi Commune, Giurgiu County
- Trestieni, a village in Tâmboești Commune, Vrancea County
- Trestienii de Jos and Trestienii de Sus, villages in Dumbrava Commune, Prahova County

and a village in Moldova:

- Trestieni, a village in Colicăuți Commune, Briceni district
- Valea-Trestieni, a commune in Nisporeni district
