= Vilia (Prut) =

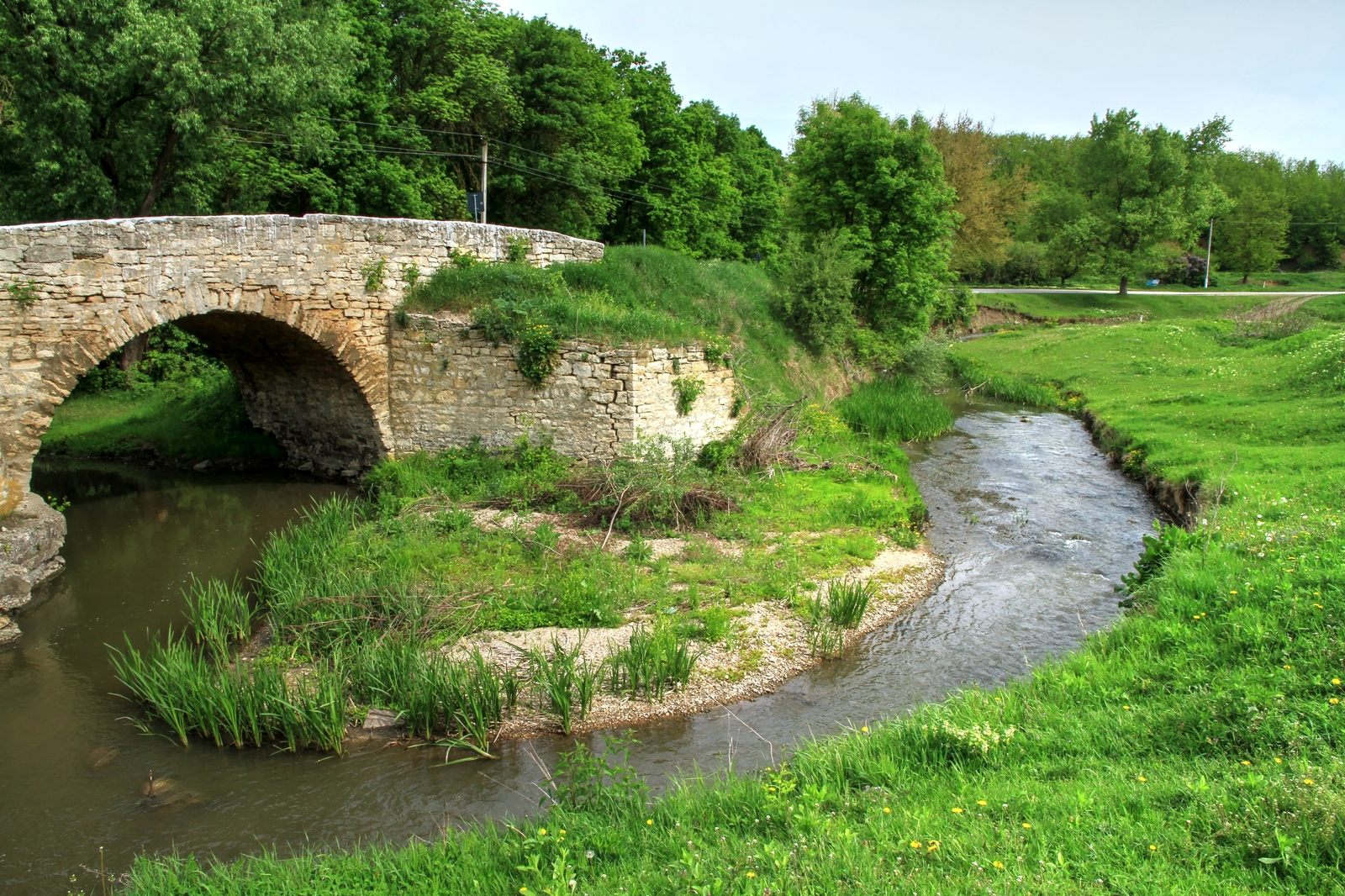

Location
- Country: Ukraine, Moldova

Physical characteristics
- Mouth
  - location: Prut at Tețcani
  - coordinates: 48.1623°N 26.9612°E
- Length: 50 km (31 mi)

Basin features
- Progression: Prut→ Danube→ Black Sea

The Vilia is a 50 km (31 mi) long left tributary of the river Prut in western Ukraine and northern Moldova. Its source is near the village of Buzovytsia (Dniester Raion), Ukraine. After passing the village Lukachivka, it crosses the Moldovan border and continues south through the villages Cotiujeni, Berlinți, Beleavinți and Balasinești. It discharges into the Prut near the village Tețcani, on the border with Romania.
