= Caracușenii =

Caracușenii may refer to one of two places in Briceni District, Moldova:

- Caracușenii Vechi
- Caracușenii Noi, a village in Berlinți Commune
