= Lipcani =

Town in Briceni District, Moldova

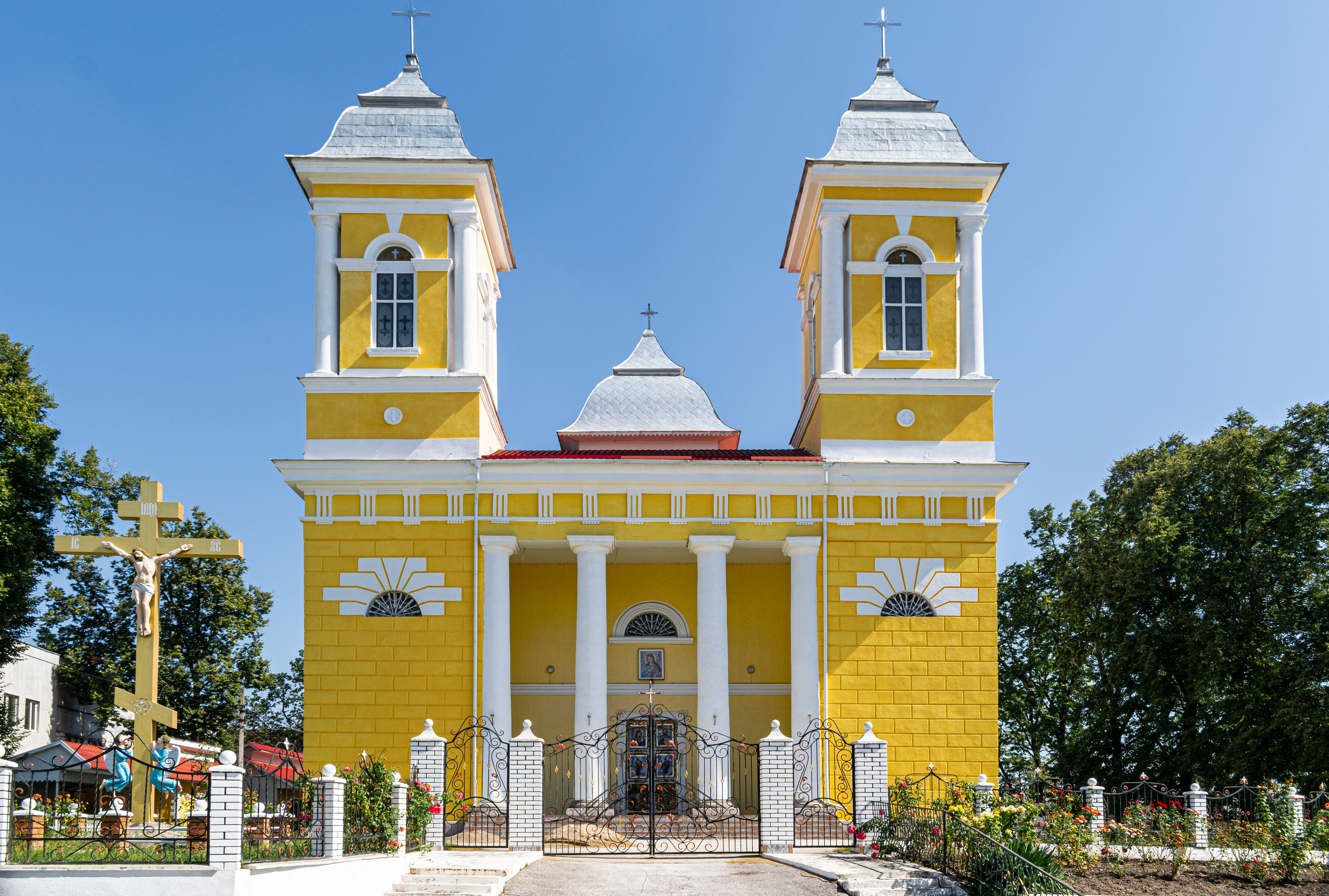
- Church in Lipcani

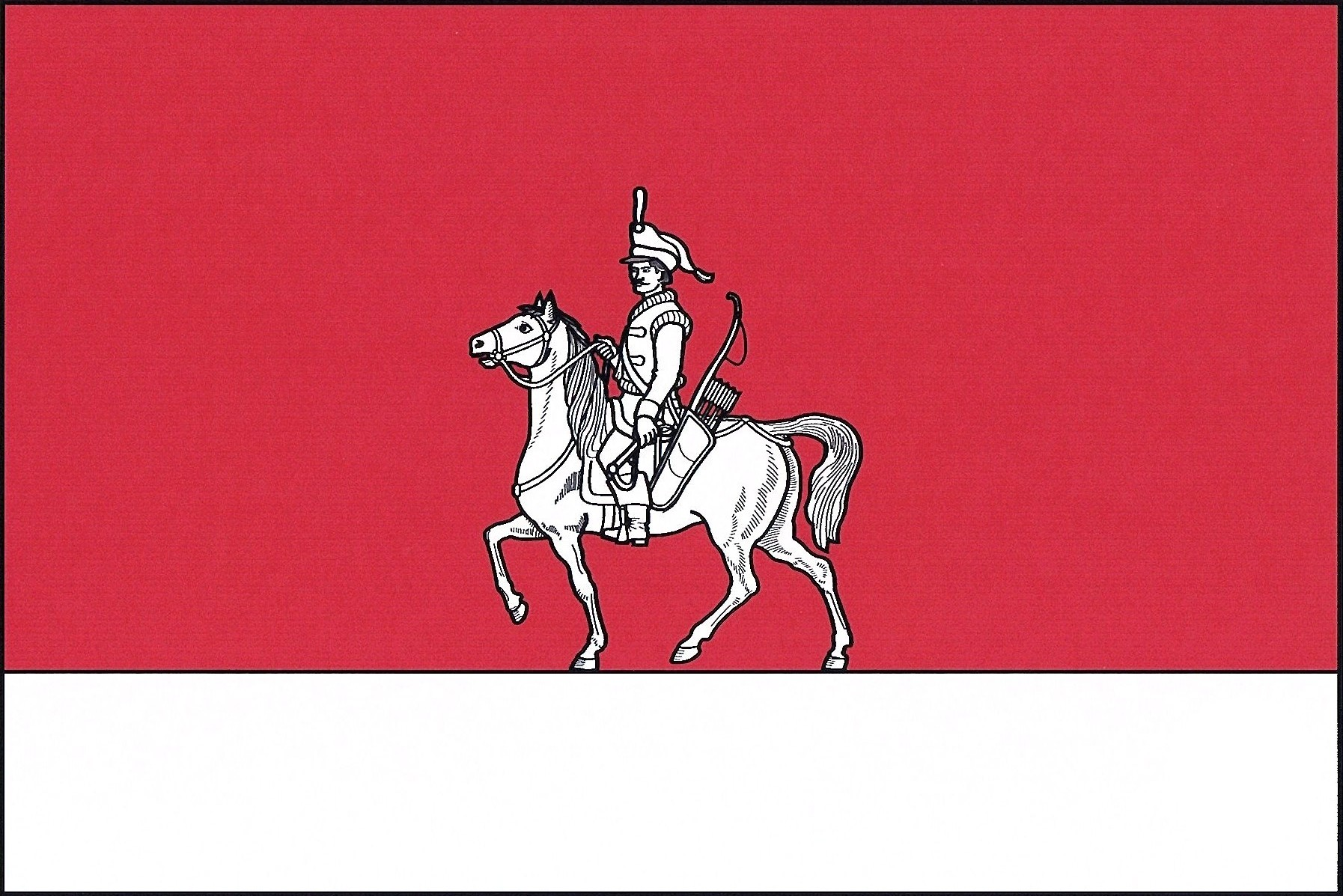
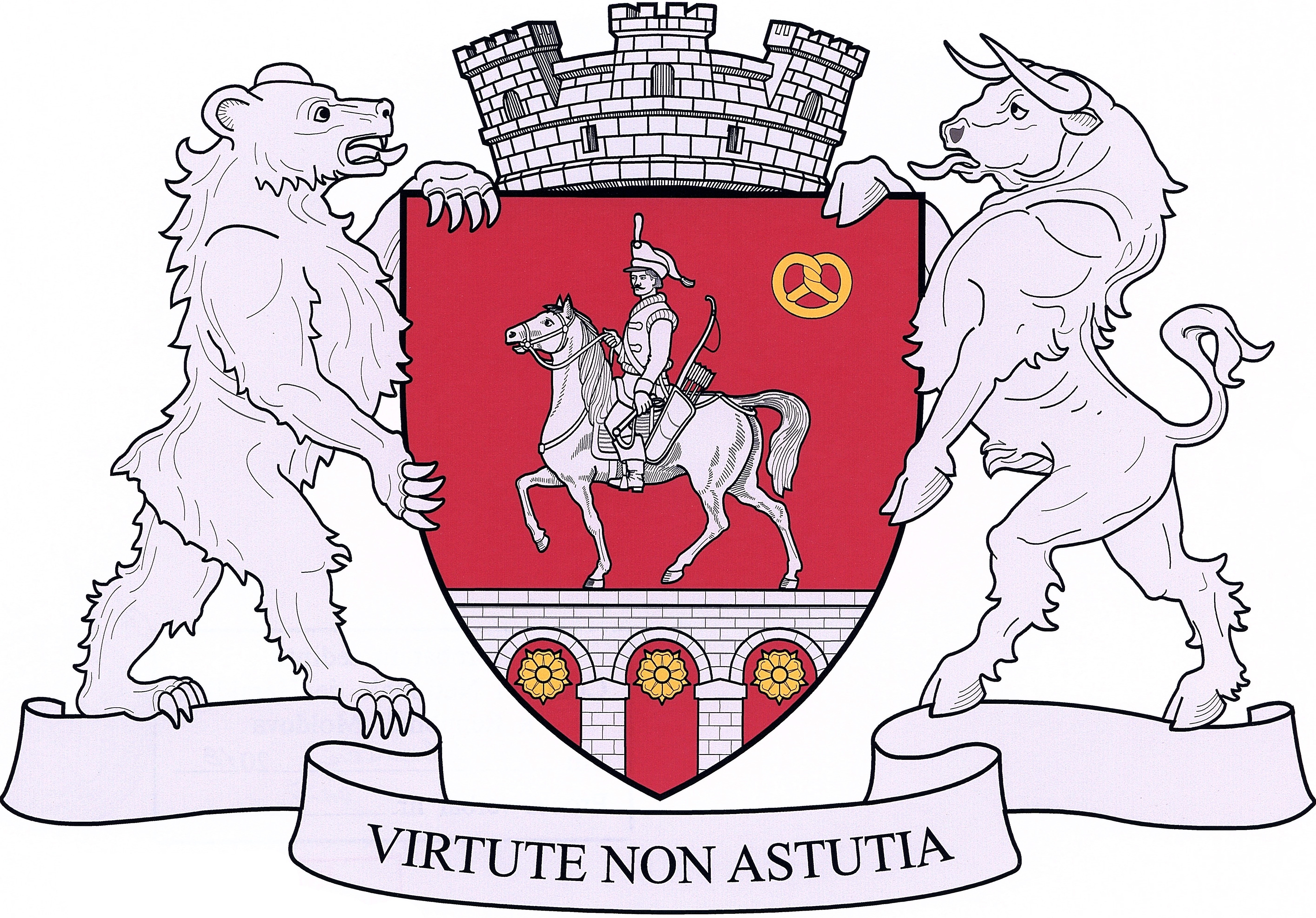
- Flag Seal
- Interactive map of Lipcani
- Location in Moldova
- Coordinates: 48°16′N 26°48′E
- Country: Moldova
- District: Briceni District
- Established: 1699

Government
  - Mayor: Dumenco Evghenii

Area
  - Total: 4.58 sq mi (11.87 km^{2})

Population (2014)
  - Total: 4,685
  - Density: 1,022/sq mi (394.7/km^{2})
- Time zone: UTC+2 (EET)
  - Summer (DST): UTC+3 (EEST)
- Postal code: MD-4706
- Area code: + 373 247

Lipcani (Romanian pronunciation: [lipˈkanʲ]) is a town in Briceni District, Moldova. It is also a border crossing between Moldova and Romania.

== Overview ==
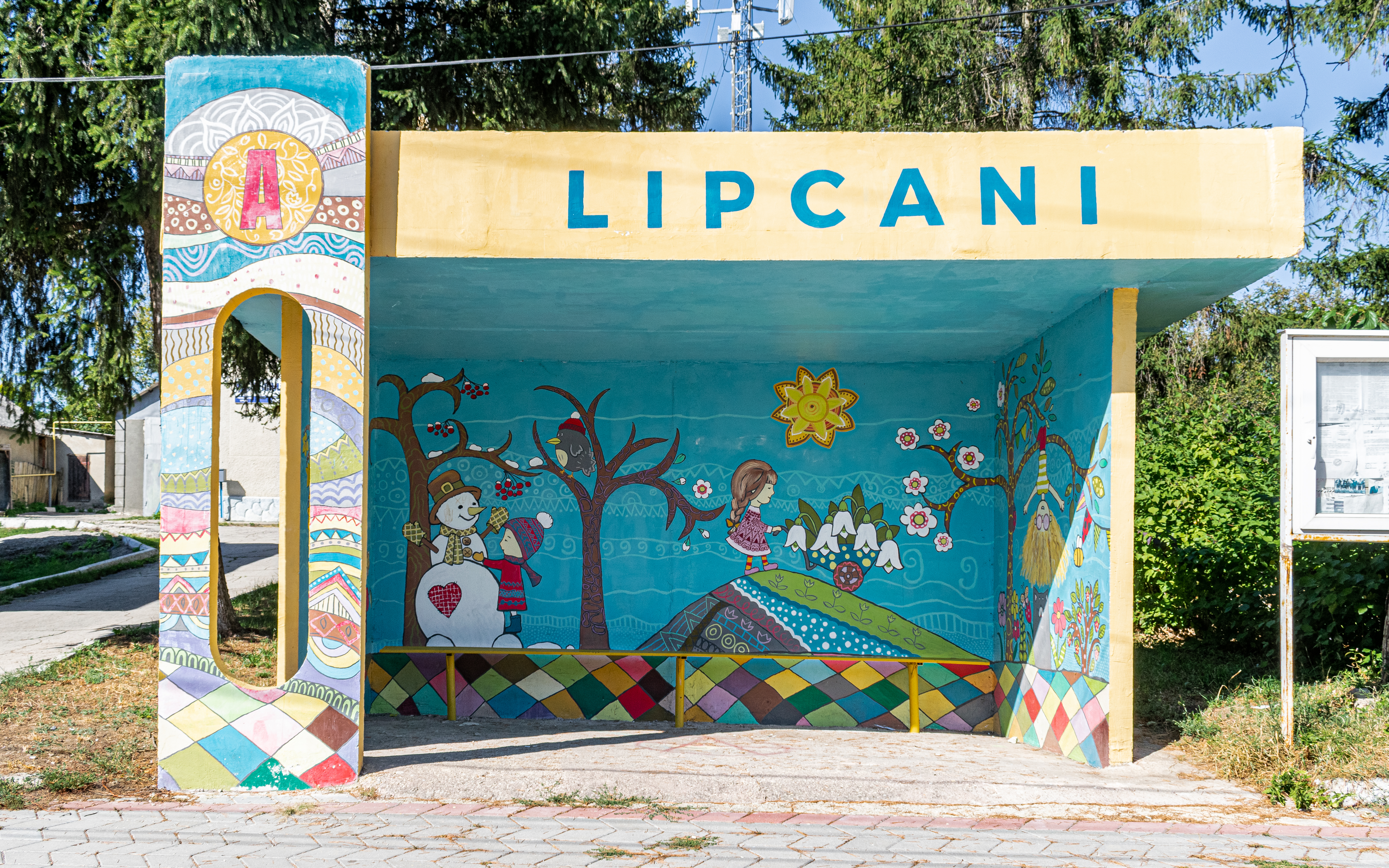
Bus stop with the name of the town

Lipcani is located on the banks of the Prut river, which forms the border with Romania. The border with Ukraine (Criva border crossing point) is also only a few kilometers to the north. Lipcani is located in the Bessarabia region. The closest large urban centres are Chernivtsi in Ukraine, Suceava in Romania, and Bălți in Moldova. Lipcani is about 40 km (25 mi) from the Ukrainian city of Khotyn. The town is crossed by a small river called Medvedca.

Because of misspelling or translation difficulties, it is also referred to as: Lipcan, Lipcany, Lipkan, Lipkani, Lipchen, Lipcheny, Lipcheni, Lipcani Targ, Lipceni, Lipchany, Lypchany, Lipchani, Lipkamya, Lepkan, Lepkany, Lepkani, Lepcan, Lepcany, Lepcani, Linkani, Liptchani, Lipkane, Lipkon and Lipcon.

== Timeline ==
- June 17, 1429: The first historical mention of Lipcani.
- 1699: Some of the Kamieniec Lipka Tatars who remained loyal to the Ottoman Sultan after fighting for him were settled in a town in Bessarabia that became known as Lipcani.
- 1812: Lipcani and the rest of Bessarabia became a part of Russia.
- 1900: Population 4,410. Name: Lipkany, Khotin, Bessarabia, Russian Empire.
- 1904: By this year, there was already a railroad connecting Lipcani with Novoselitsy.
- 1905: Various parts of Bessarabia were subject to Anti-Jewish pogroms.
- August 1916: Romania entered WWI on the side of the Triple Entente against Austria-Hungary & Germany.
- March 2, 1918: The 2nd Cavalry Division of the Austro-Hungarian Army, who was originally subordinate to the Kosak Group and then to the 17th Army Corps and to the Ost-Armee, took Lipcani and Larga. They later moved to Odessa.
- 6 February [O.S. 24 January] 1918: Bessarabia was still part of the Russian Empire, but after the Russian Revolution it declared itself an independent republic (Moldavian Democratic Republic). The regional National Council (Sfatul Țării) of the Moldavian Democratic Republic decided union with Romania on 9 April [O.S. 27 March] 1918.

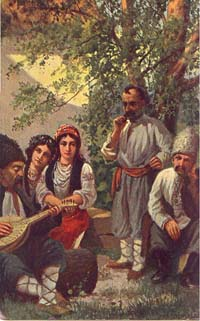
A Quiet Evening in Lipcani, Bessarabia (printed postcard from the early 1900s)

- August 11, 1918 The 187th Brigade of the Austro-Hungarian Army moved from Czernowitz, via Novoselytsia, to Lipcani, where they stayed until August 15.
- August 16, 1924: Along the forest of Zelena (15 mi from Hotin), a couple of Romanian gendarmes who were taking two terrorists whom they had just arrested to Lipcani, were attacked by a Russian squad who killed one gendarme and went off with the terrorists.
- 1930: Name: Lipcani-Târg, Hotin, Basarabia, Romania.
- 1935: Lipcani Culture house built.
- 1937: Lipcani–Rădăuți-Prut Bridge opened.
- End of the 1930s: Lipcani was a small provincial town, populated mainly by Jews, who mostly lived in the central part of the town. There were about ten synagogues in Lipcani. There was a different synagogue for each guild: tailors, shoemakers, cabmen, etc. "Guild" synagogues were located in neighborhoods in the outskirts of town. Richer Jews had big synagogues in the center of town. There were 4,698 Jews on the eve of World War II.
- June–July 1940: The Red Army entered Lipcani, declaring it part of the Soviet Union. Many Romanians escaped to Romania and left all their belongings behind. The Soviet authorities arrested all kulaks, executed some and sent the rest to Siberia. Since the Communist system promoted atheism, the authorities began to fight religion by closing synagogues, churches and cheders.
- August 2, 1940: The Moldavian SSR was formed, which included Bessarabia without its Southern part. Territories given to Ukraine initially included Edineț, Briceni, Lipcani and Ocnița. When the Soviets came, Lipcani was a town near the border. It belonged to the USSR and the area beyond the town was Romania.
- November 4, 1940: The borders were changed by the decree of the SS of USSR.
- 1940: 1,218 households and 5,726 people.
- June 22, 1941: The Germans invaded the Soviet Union and opened fire on Lipcani. There was a commandant office and a frontier regiment in Lipcani that set up a defensive position.
- July 1941: The Germans captured Bessarabia, and the 41,000 km^{2} (16,000 sq mi) area of Ukraine named Transnistria was granted by Hitler to the Romanian dictator Ion Antonescu for Romania’s participation in the war against the Soviet Union. Jews from Bessarabia, Bukovina and Moldova were transferred to Transnistria and many thousands were murdered from 1941 to 1944 by the Romanian Gendarmerie, the Einsatzgruppe D, Ukrainian police and Sonderkommando R.
- July 8, 1941: Jews from the towns of Lipcani and Sekiryany were sent to Briceni.
- July 11, 1941: In Lipcani-Hotin, the Military Police took 12 Jewish hostages and executed them.
- July 20, 1941: The death march of 1,200 Jews from Lipcani began. The Germans took them to concentration camps where they were never heard of again. The ones that could not make the trip on foot were shot on sight and during the trip.
- July 28, 1941: All Jews from Briceni were dispatched across the Dniester and several were shot en route. When they arrived in Mogilev, the Germans "selected" the old people and forced the younger ones to dig graves for them. From Mogilev the rest were turned back to Ataki and then on to Sekiryany. Hundreds died en route. For a month they stayed in the ghetto, only to be deported again to Transnistria. All the young Jews were murdered in the forest near Soroca.
- October 9 and 10 (1941): Jews from Rădăuți were carried to their death in train wagons meant for transporting animals. These trains passed through Lipcani. There, the Germans sent one group to the Dniester through Ataki, and the other group to Mărculeşti.
- 1941–1944: Around 148,000 Bessarabian Jews were killed in Rîbnița and other ghettos and concentration camps on the East bank of the Dniester during the Nazi occupation. During the war, the town, including almost all synagogues, was burnt down by the Germans.
- 1950: Name: Lipkany, Soviet Union.
- 1944: Jassy–Kishinev Offensive (August 1944). The Red Army drove the Romanian and German armies out of Bessarabia, which became an integral part of the Moldavian Soviet Socialist Republic (as of 2006, most of Bessarabia is part of the independent Republic of Moldova and has been so since the dissolution of the USSR).
- July 6–20, 1996: A water ecological expedition called "Prut 96", organized by the NGO called Association of Ecological Education and Information "Terra Nostra" was held down the Prut river from the village of Lipcani to the village of Sculeni in the Ungheni region. The goal of the expedition was to examine the Prut river with the participation of students and post-graduates in order to attract attention of the population and state services towards the ecological problems of the river and the whole region.
- April 7, 1999: The Lipcani soccer team Venita lost to the FC Olimpia Bălți in the quarterfinals for the Moldovan Cup 1998-99.
- 2000: The Moldovan Section of the International Society for Human Rights and the NGO's Datino and Credo were working with the women's prison in Ruska and the colony for young men in Lipcani.
- March 17, 2004: According to Stela Melnic of the Ministry of Economy, the construction of a 1.5 km (0.93 mi) bypass road to the Lipcani–Rădăuți-Prut Bridge is going to start next autumn. Sponsored by TACIS and EU PHARE the project involves Moldova and Romania. The project will also include the modernization of the Lipcani customs checkpoint.
- June 17, 2007: the candidate of PCRM Dumenco Evghenii (Eugen Dumenco) is elected as mayor of Lipcani. Dumenco Evghenii (born 1958) is an auto mechanic and president of SA "CMD-8".
- February 15, 2010: Lipcani–Rădăuți-Prut Bridge reopened.

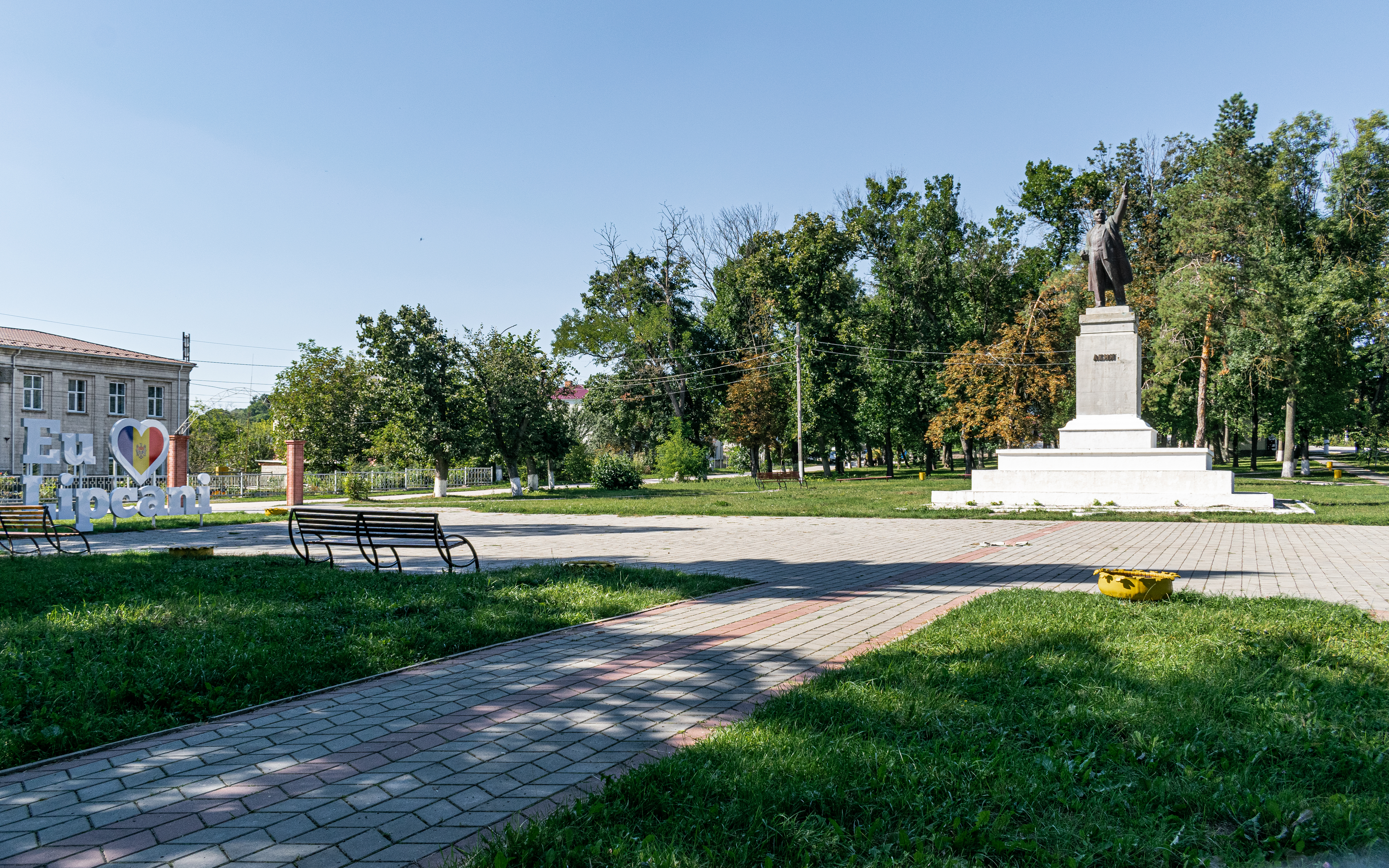
I Love Lipcani installation in front of the Lenin monument, 2020

== Current information ==
- Railroad lines in Moldova run north-south from Cahul and the southern border with Ukraine to Lipcani and the northern border with Ukraine. The main road routes run from Cahul to Chişinău via Comrat and from Chişinău to Lipcani via Bălți.
- Current Institutions in Lipcani: Lipcani Pedagogical College, Lipcani Reformatory for Boys.

== Books ==
- Lipcan Fun Amol (Lipcan of Old) – Aaron Shuster, Yizkor book in Yiddish, 1957,218 Pages. Has B/W photos of the town.
- Kehilat Lipkany: Sefer Zikaron (Prayer for Lipkany): Book of Remembrance – Author/Editor: Zilberman-Slone, Tel Aviv 1963, 407 Pages, Languages: Hebrew & Yiddish, Published in Tel-Aviv.

== Notable people ==
- Moyshe Altman (1890–1980), Yiddish prose writer, revered for his intricate style
- Shaike Dan (1909–1994), one of the Jewish Parachutists of Mandate Palestine
- Vasile Didic (born 1949), painter with works in several Moldovan museums
- Eliezer Greenberg (1896–1977), American Yiddish poet
- Irina Lozovan (born 1983), Moldovan politician
- Fraydele Oysher (1913–2004), actress in the Yiddish theater
- Moishe Oysher (1907–1958), Yiddish singer and cantor
- Eliezer Steinbarg (1880–1932), Yiddish poet, educator, and well-known author of Yiddish fables
- Judah Steinberg (1863–1908), a Hebrew writer
- Jacob Sternberg (1890–1973), Yiddish poet and theatrical director
- Alexander Grobman Tversqui (born 1927), agricultural scientist

== Locations of other towns called Lipcani (or similar) ==
- 89.0 km (55.3 mi) north of Chişinău, Moldova (This town is called Lipceni and is sometimes confused with Lipcani.)
- 304.2 km (189.0 mi) southwest of Kiev, Ukraine] This town is called Lypcany is also sometimes confused with Lipcani.
