= Extreme points of Moldova =

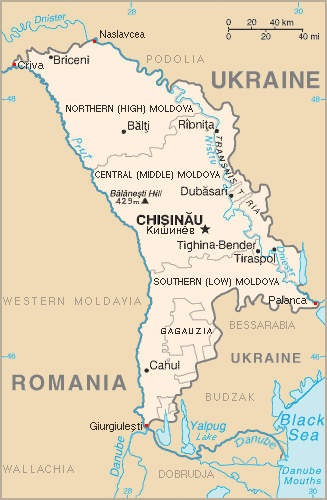
Moldova map : extreme points as red dots.

This is a list of the extreme points of Moldova: the points that are farther north, south, east or west than any other location, as well as the highest and lowest points in the country.

== Extreme coordinates ==
Heading	Location	District	Bordering entity	Coordinates	Notes
North extreme	Naslavcea	Ocnița District	Mohyliv-Podilskyi Raion of Vinnytsia Oblast (Ukraine)	48°29′28″N 27°35′19″E	
South extreme	Giurgiulești	Cahul District	Galați (Romania) & Reni (Ukraine) (Moldova/Romania/Ukraine tripoint)	45°28′08″N 28°12′47″E	
West extreme	Criva	Briceni District	Păltiniș (Romania) & Dniester Raion (Ukraine) (Moldova/Romania/Ukraine tripoint)	48°16′27″N 26°36′59″E	
East extreme	Palanca	Ștefan Vodă District	Bilhorod-Dnistrovskyi Raion of Odesa Oblast (Ukraine)	46°24′48″N 30°09′47″E	

== Elevation extremes ==
- Highest point: Bălănești Hill at 430 m (47°13′01″N 28°05′00″E)
- Lowest point: Dniester river at 2 m

== See also ==
- Extreme points of Europe
- Extreme points of Earth
- Geography of Moldova
