= Mihăileni, Briceni =

Mihăileni
- Commune
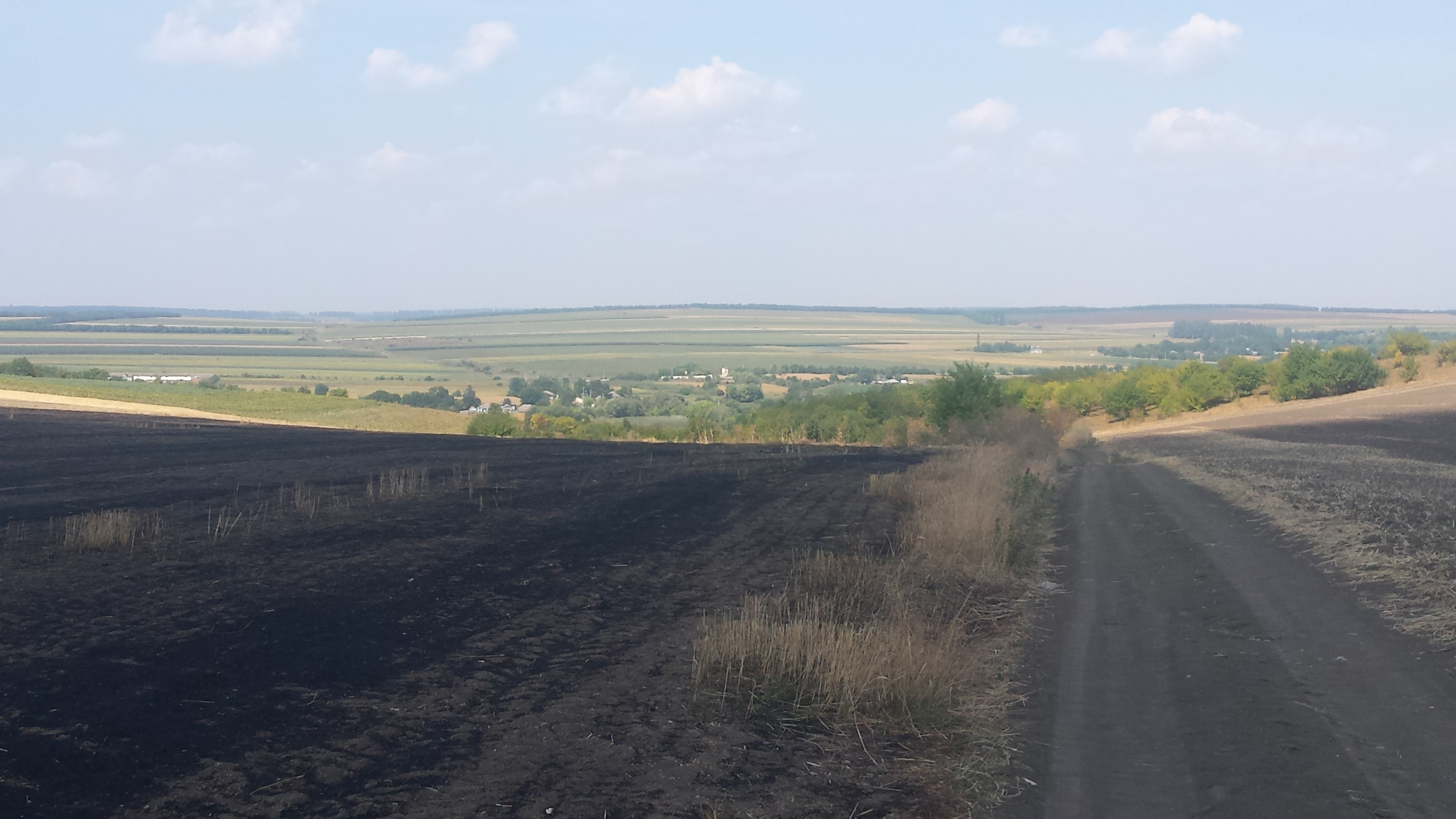

- Location within Moldova
- Coordinates: 48°14′44″N 27°14′55″E
- Country: Moldova
- District: Briceni District

Area
  - Total: 16.54 km^{2} (6.39 sq mi)

Population (2014)
  - Total: 689
- Time zone: UTC+2 (EET)
  - Summer (DST): UTC+3 (EEST)
- Postal code: MD-4734

Mihăileni is a commune in Briceni District, Moldova. It is composed of two villages, Groznița and Mihăileni.
