= Medveja, Briceni =

Medveja
- Commune
- Interactive map of Medveja
- Location within Moldova
- Coordinates: 48°22′00″N 26°47′00″E
- Country: Moldova

Population (2014)
  - Total: 1,423
- Time zone: UTC+2 (EET)
  - Summer (DST): UTC+3 (EEST)

Medveja is a commune in Briceni District, Moldova. It is composed of two villages, Medveja and Slobozia-Medveja.
