= Drepcăuți =

- Village
- Location in Moldova
- Coordinates: 48°16′N 26°43′E
- Country: Moldova
- District: Briceni District
- Elevation: 371 ft (113 m)

Population (2014 census)
  - Total: 2,188
- Time zone: UTC+2 (EET)
  - Summer (DST): UTC+3 (EEST)
- Postal code: MD-4724
- Area code: +373 247

Drepcăuți is a village in Briceni District, Moldova.

== Notable people ==
- Gheorghe Brega
- Nicanor Lemne
