= Chorniava =

Location
- Country: Ukraine

Physical characteristics
- Mouth
  - location: Prut at Vovchkivtsi
  - coordinates: 48.4679°N 25.4021°E
- Length: 63 km (39 mi)

Basin features
- Progression: Prut→ Danube→ Black Sea

The Chorniava is a 63 km (39 mi) long left tributary of the river Prut in western Ukraine. Its source is near the village of Zhukotyn (Kolomyia Raion), Ukraine. It flows through the villages and towns Zhukiv, Obertyn, Yakivka, Vynohrad, Hvizdets, Balyntsi and Kelykhiv. It discharges into the Prut near the village of Vovchkivtsi (Kolomyia Raion).
