= Marcăuți, Briceni =

Marcăuți
- Commune
- Location within Moldova
- Coordinates: 48.3138888889°N 27.2261111111°E
- Country: Moldova
- District: Briceni District

Population (2014)
  - Total: 2,215
- Time zone: UTC+2 (EET)
  - Summer (DST): UTC+3 (EEST)

Marcăuți is a commune in Briceni District, Moldova. It is composed of two villages, Marcăuți and Marcăuții Noi.
