= Halahora de Sus =

- Commune
- Location within Moldova
- Coordinates: 48°15′12″N 27°10′48″E
- Country: Moldova
- District: Briceni District

Government
  - Mayor: Organ Alexandru
- Elevation: 204 m (669 ft)

Population (2014)
  - Total: 1,588
- Time zone: UTC+2 (EET)
  - Summer (DST): UTC+3 (EEST)
- Postal code: MD-4729

Halahora de Sus is a commune in Briceni District, Moldova. It is composed of three villages: Chirilovca, Halahora de Jos and Halahora de Sus.
