= Corjeuți =

- Village
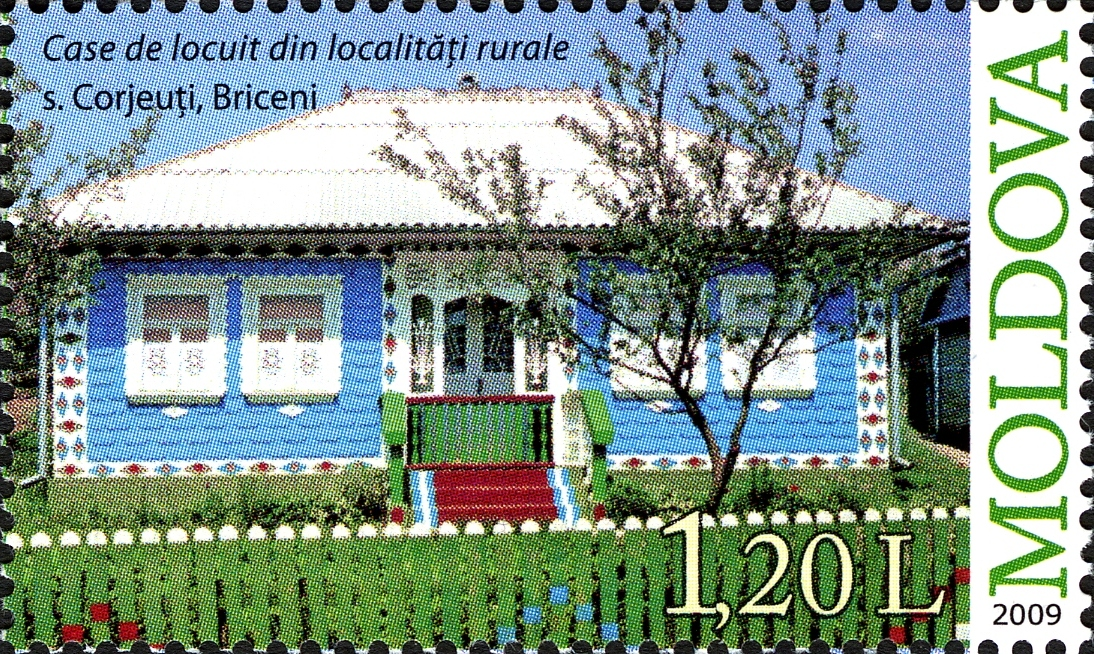

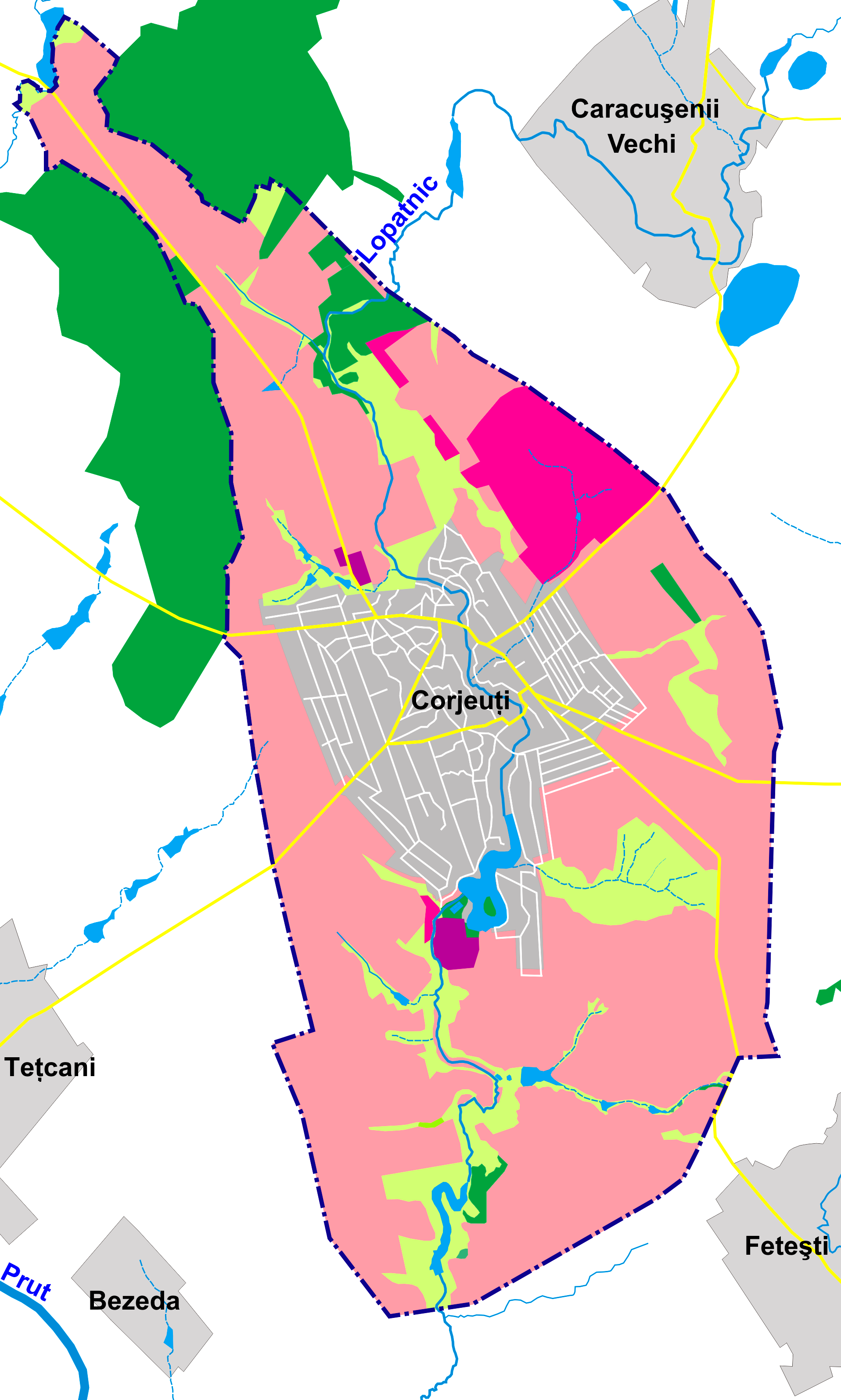

- Location within Moldova
- Coordinates: 48°12′45″N 27°2′35″E
- Country: Moldova
- District: Briceni

Government
  - Mayor: Victor Andronic (PDM)

Area
  - Total: 5,259 km^{2} (2,031 sq mi)
- Elevation: 141 m (463 ft)

Population (2014 census)
  - Total: 6,643
- Time zone: UTC+2 (EET)
  - Summer (DST): UTC+3 (EEST)
- Postal code: MD-4720

Corjeuți is a village in Briceni District, Moldova.
