= Prut =

River in Eastern Europe; part of Romania's border with Moldova and Ukraine

Prut Porata, Pyretus
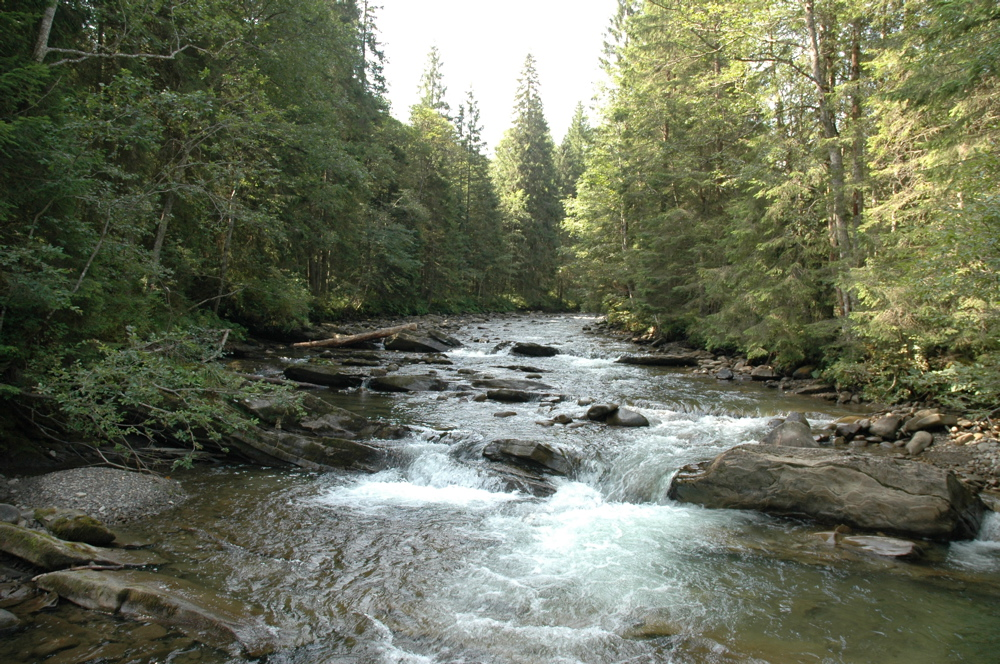
- Prut River near Hoverla, Ivano-Frankivsk Oblast

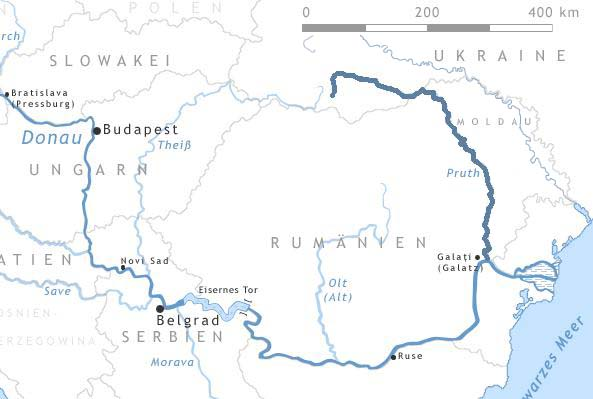
- Map of the Prut River

Location
- Country: Ukraine; Romania; Moldova
- Oblasts/ Counties/ Districts: Ukraine: Ivano-Frankivsk; Chernivtsi; Romania: Botoșani; Iași; Vaslui; Galați; Moldova: Briceni; Edineț; Rîșcani; Glodeni; Fălești; Ungheni; Nisporeni; Hîncești; Leova; Cantemir; Cahul
- Cities: Kolomyia; Chernivtsi; Ungheni; Leova; Cahul

Physical characteristics
- Source: Mt. Hoverla, Carpathian Mountains
  - location: Yablunytsia, Nadvirna Raion, Ivano-Frankivsk Oblast, Ukraine
  - coordinates: 48°9′16.9194″N 24°30′32.2194″E
- Mouth: Danube
  - location: Galați, Romania; Giurgiulești, Moldova
  - coordinates: 45°28′8″N 28°12′28″E
- Length: 953 km (592 mi)
- Basin size: 27,540 km^{2} (10,630 sq mi)
- Discharge
  - location: mouth
  - average: 110 m^{3}/s (3,900 cu ft/s)

Basin features
- Progression: Danube→ Black Sea
- Tributaries
  - right: Cheremosh, Jijia

Ramsar Wetland
- Official name: Prut River Headwaters
- Designated: 20 March 2019
- Reference no.: 2395

The Prut (also spelled in English as Pruth; Romanian pronunciation: [prut], Ukrainian: Прут) is a river in Eastern Europe. It is a left tributary of the Danube and is 953 km (592 mi) long. Part of its course forms Romania's border with Moldova and Ukraine.

== Characteristics ==
The Prut originates on the eastern slope of Mount Hoverla, in the Carpathian Mountains in Ukraine (Ivano-Frankivsk Oblast). At first, the river flows to the north. Near Yaremche it turns to the northeast, and near Kolomyia to the south-east. Having reached the border between Moldova and Romania, it turns further southeast, and then to the south. It eventually joins the Danube near Giurgiulești, east of Galați and west of Reni.

Between 1918 and 1939, the river was partly in Poland and partly in Greater Romania (Romanian: România Mare). Prior to World War I, it served as a border between Romania and the Russian Empire. After World War II, the river once again denoted a border, this time between Romania and the Soviet Union. Nowadays, for a length of 31 km (19 mi), it forms the border between Romania and Ukraine, and for 711 km (442 mi), it forms the border between Romania and Moldova. It has a hydrographic basin of 27,540 km^{2}, of which 10,990 km^{2} (4,240 sq mi) is in Romania and 7,790 km^{2} (3,010 sq mi) in Moldova. The largest city along its banks is Chernivtsi, Ukraine.

The Stânca-Costești Dam, operated jointly by Moldova and Romania, is built on the Prut. There is also a Hydro-Electric Station in Sniatyn (Ukraine). Ships travel from the river's mouth to the port city of Leova (southern Moldova).

The lowermost part of the basin is strongly marshy. The average discharge at its mouth is 110 m^{3}/s (3,900 cu ft/s). The average discharge at the city of Leova is 69.2 m^{3}/s (2,440 cu ft/s). The slope of the river varies from 100 m/km (near the source) to 0.05 m/km (near the mouth). In the upper reaches (to Delyatyn) it has a mountainous character, with a steep right bank, sometimes the cross-sectional profile of the channel has the form of a ridge. Near the city of Yaremche is the waterfall of Probiy.

== Name ==
The Prut was known in Antiquity as the Pyretus (Ancient Greek: Πυρετός, romanized: Pyretós), or Scythian Porata (possibly), Hierasus (Ἱέρασος, Hiérasos) or Gerasius. Herodotus lists the Prut, under the name of Porata or Pyretus, as being among the five rivers flowing through the Scythian country which swell the Danube. In the second volume of the Ottoman-Bulgarian chronicles of Iman "Jagfar Tarihi" (1680) the Prut River is referred to as Burat. And in the Byzantine treatise of Constantine Porphyrogennetos "On the management of the empire" it is mentioned as the Brut river (Chap. 38) or as Burat (Chapter 42).

== Towns ==
The following towns are situated along the river Prut, from source to mouth: Vorokhta, Yaremche, Deliatyn, Lanchyn, Kolomyia, Zabolotiv, Sniatyn, Nepolokivtsi, Luzhany, Chernivtsi, Novoselytsia, Darabani, Lipcani, Ungheni, Prisăcani, Leova, Cantemir, and Cahul.

== Tributaries ==
The following rivers are tributaries to the river Prut (source to mouth):

Left: Turka, Chorniava, Sovytsia, Rokytna, Rynhach, Cherlena, Larga (Briceni), Vilia, Lopatnic, Racovăț, Ciuhur, Camenca, Delia, Nârnova, Lăpușna, Sărata, Larga (Cantemir)

Right: Pistynka, Rybnytsia, Cheremosh, Derelui, Hertsa, Poiana, Cornești, Isnovăț, Rădăuți, Ghireni, Volovăț, Badu, Bașeu, Corogea, Berza Veche, Râioasa, Soloneț, Cerchezoaia, Jijia, Bohotin, Moșna, Pruteț, Gârla Boul Bătrân, Copăceana, Belciug, Elan, Horincea, Oancea, Stoeneșa, Brănești, Chineja

== Historical events ==
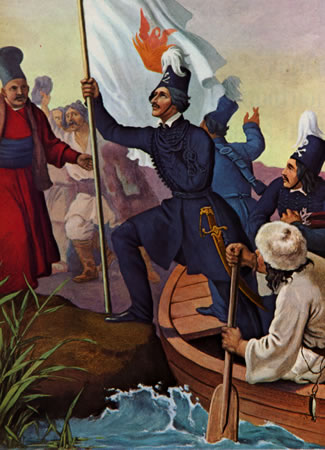
Alexandros Ypsilantis crosses the Pruth [in 1822] by Peter von Hess, Benaki Museum, Athens.

In 1538, the Ottoman army of Suleiman the Magnificent crossed the Prut during the campaign of Karaboğdan.

During the Russo-Turkish War of 1710–1711, on 19 July 1711 Russian forces initially divided among Peter the Great's army on the west bank and Boris Sheremetev's army on the east bank of the Pruth and allied with Dimitrie Cantemir, the ruler of Moldova, met with the Ottoman army led by Grand Vizier Baltaci Mehmed Pasha. The Turks and Crimean Tatars attacked first against Sheremetev, who then retreated to the other side to join Peter the Great. Afterwards the Russian army set up a defensive camp between Stănilești and the river, which was then completely surrounded by the Ottoman army. Negotiations started on 21 July 1711 and the Treaty of the Prut was signed on 23 July 1711. After this treaty, Dimitrie Cantemir had to go in exile at Moscow. This treaty led to the end of local dynasties of kings and inauguration of Greek rulers from the Fanar Quarter of Istanbul (Phanariotes).

During the Russo-Turkish War of 1768-74, on 1 August 1770, Russian forces led by Field Marshal Pyotr Rumyantsev defeated a larger Ottoman army led by Grand Vizier Ivazzade Halil Pasha in the Battle of Kagul on the Prut.

In 1821, the Greek Nationalist leader Alexander Ypsilantis crossed the Prut river at Sculeni, with the intention of touching off a rebellion in the Danubian Principalities. Though the Wallachian uprising ultimately failed — due especially to irreconcilable differences between Ypsilantis and his Wallachian ally Tudor Vladimirescu — it did touch off the Greek War of Independence, leading to the Kingdom of Greece gaining independence ten years later. In the Principalities it led to the end of Greek Phanariote rule, and indirectly to increasing self-government and eventually to the independence of Romania several decades later. In Greek history, Ypsilantis' crossing of the Prut is an important historical event, commemorated in a famous painting displayed at Athens.

== Popular culture ==
Sydir Vorobkevych: Within that Prut Valley (Над Прутом у лузі).

Within that Prut Valley a cabin rests close
In which lives a lassie—a beautiful rose:
Her eyes like the bright stars that lighten the sky;
When you see them, laddie, you'll pause with a sigh.

Within that Prut Valley the moon does not shine,
'Tis only a lover has come to his shrine.
A sweet conversation in murmur now goes
While dreamy old river just quietly flows.

Within that Prut Valley the flowers are plucked
And wreathes for the wedding with myrtle are tucked;
Inside of the cabin play fiddles and bass
While friends sing together: To their Happiness!

Translated by Waldimir Semenyna (13 October 1933, Ukrainian Weekly).

== Bridges ==
- Lipcani–Rădăuți-Prut Bridge
- Eiffel Bridge, Ungheni
- Costești-Stânca
- Fălciu-Cantemir
- Oancea-Cahul
- Galați-Giurgiulești

== See also ==
- Moldavia
- Pokuttya

== Gallery ==
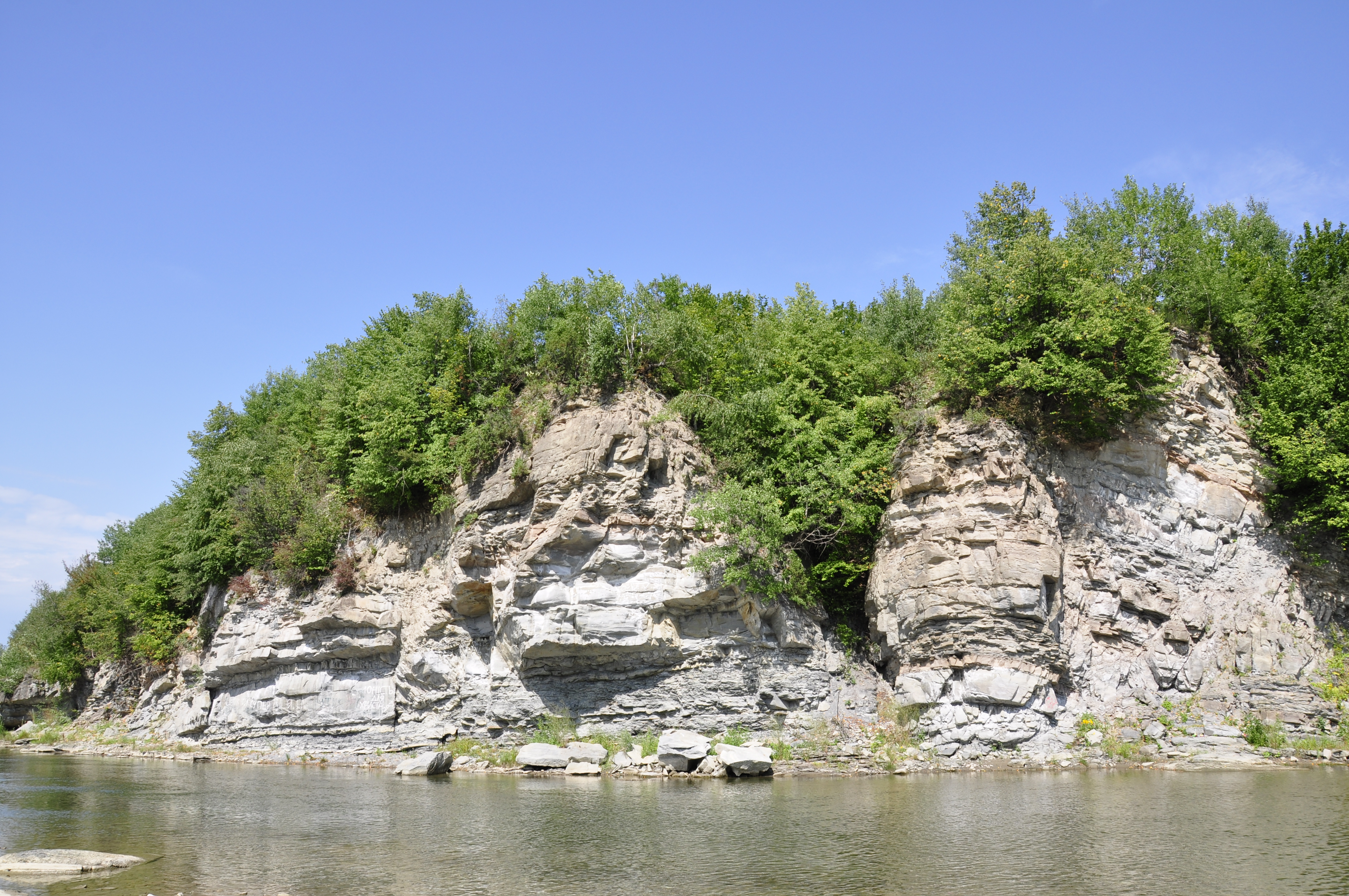
Skelia sphinx

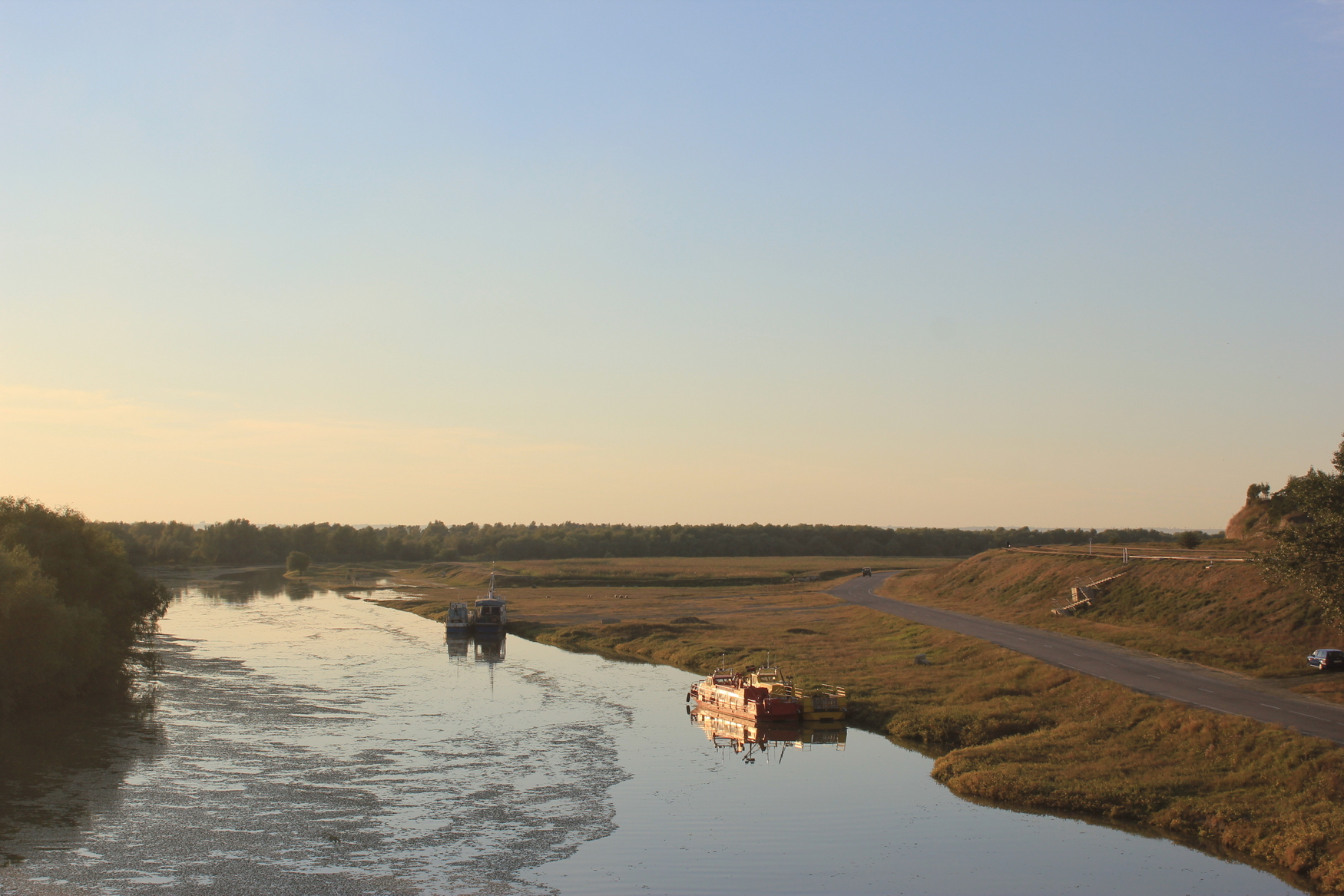
Prut near Giurgiulești, Cahul District

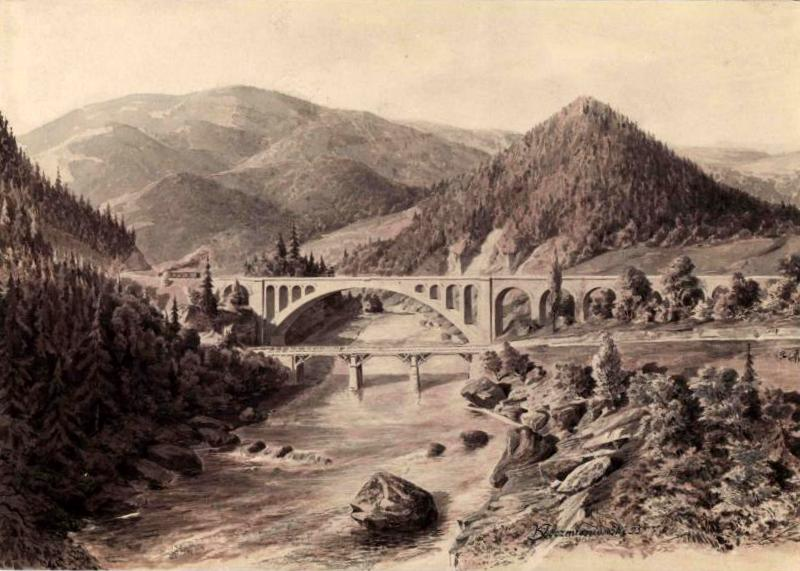
Bridge over the Prut at Yaremche. Drawing by Karl Jeczmieniowski, 1893

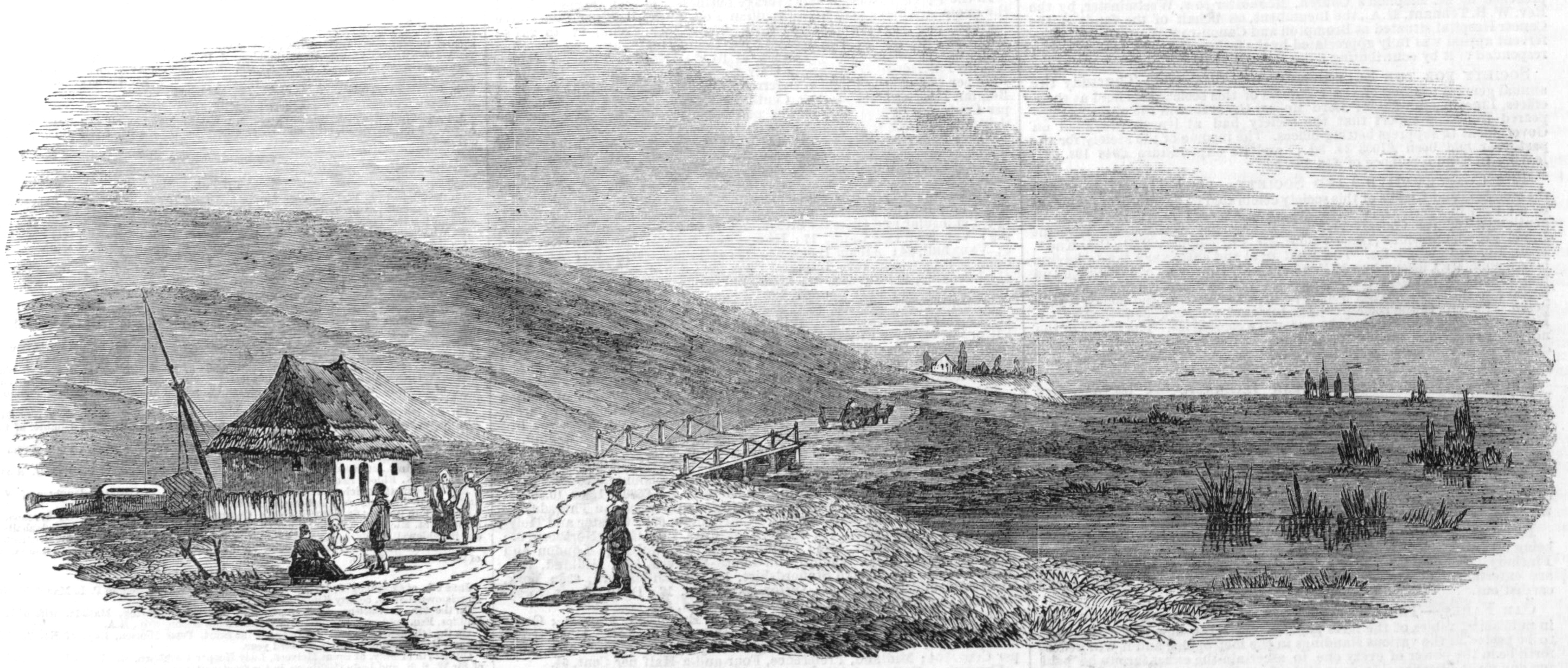
Banks of the Prut in an 1876 edition of The Illustrated London News

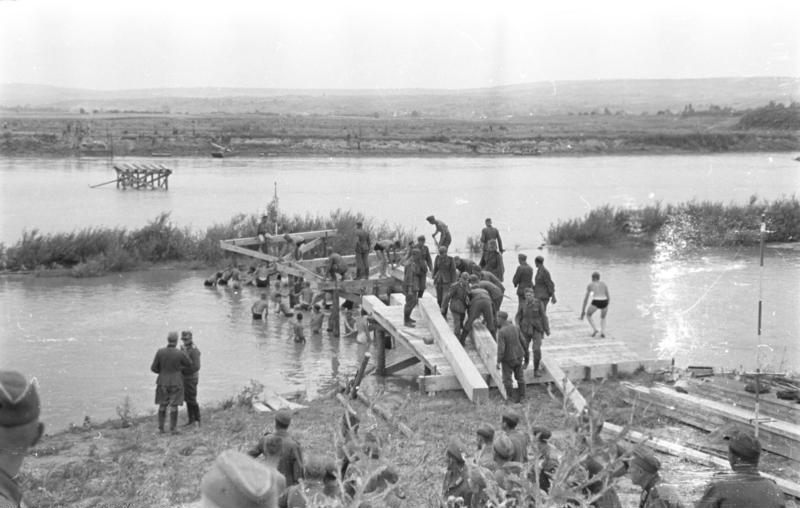
German engineers building a pontoon bridge across the Prut River during the advance towards Uman, 1941

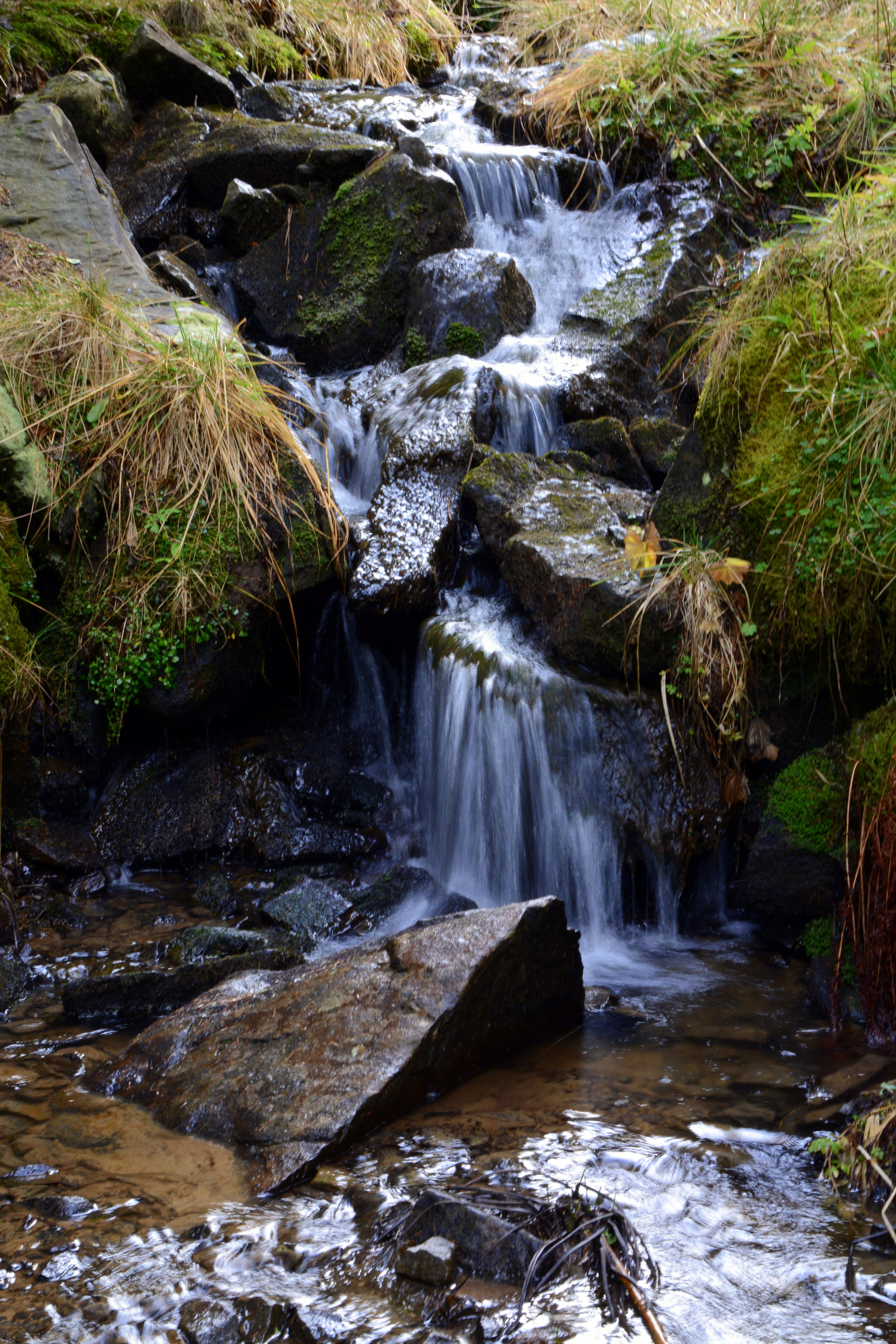
Prut at its beginning

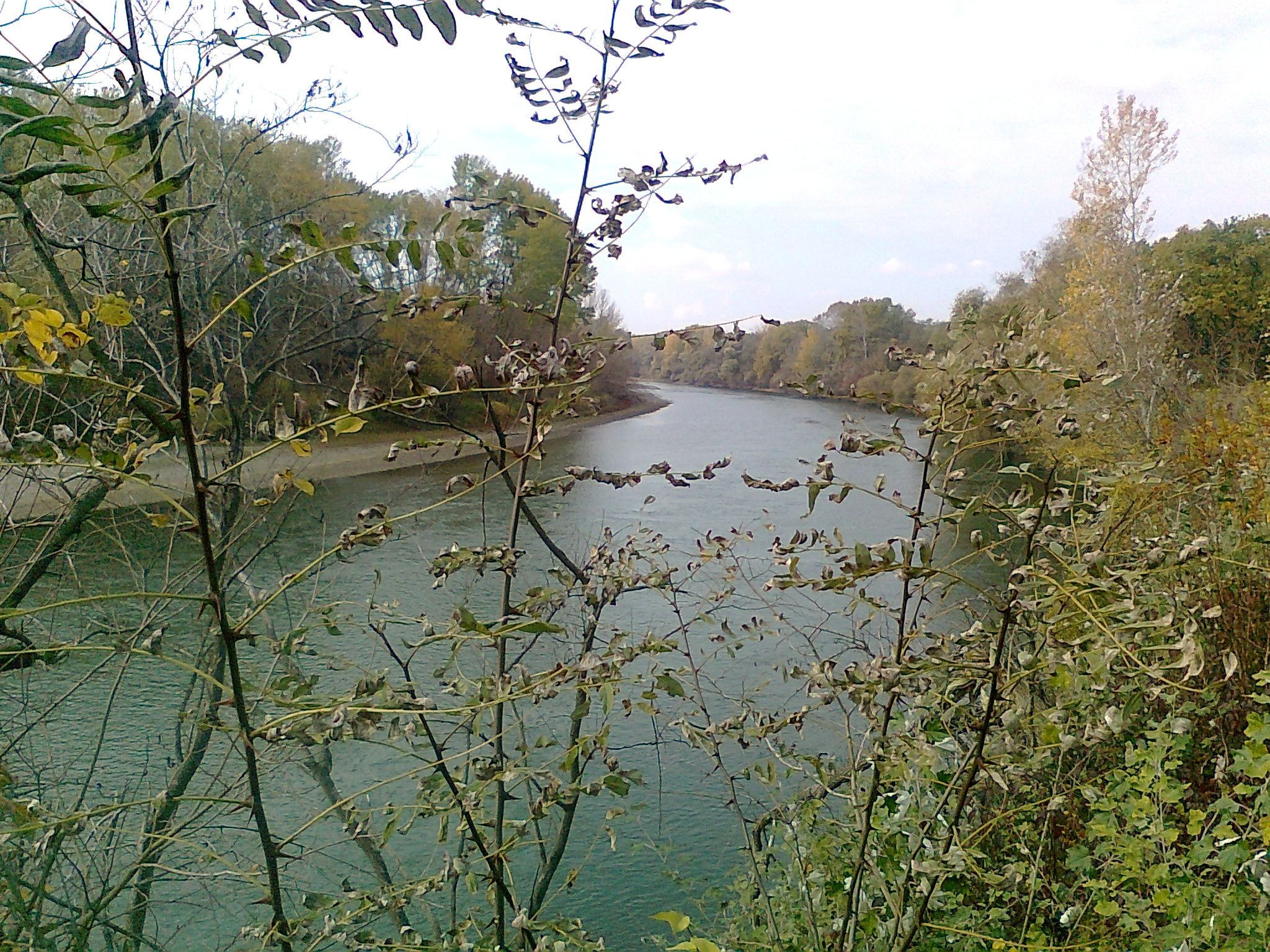
Prut River between Dămideni (Romania) and Balatina (Moldova)
