= Beleavinți =

- Village
- Location within Moldova
- Coordinates: 48°17′25″N 26°55′59″E
- Country: Moldova

Government
  - Mayor: Ivan Tulbea (Independent)
- Elevation: 170 m (560 ft)

Population (2014 census)
  - Total: 2,193
- Time zone: UTC+2 (EET)
  - Summer (DST): UTC+3 (EEST)
- Postal code: MD-4725

Beleavinți is a village in Briceni District, Moldova.
