= Nicanor Lemne =

Romanian priest, theologist and monk

Father Nicanor Lemne
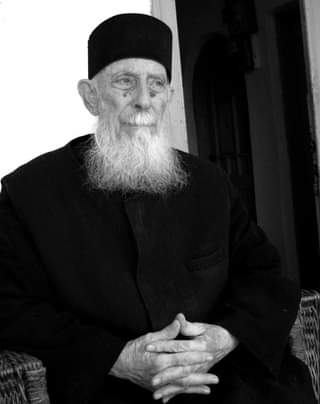
- Born: 27 December 1915; Drepcăuți, Bessarabia Governorate, Russian Empire
- Died: September 15, 2017 (aged 101); Siliștea Snagovului, Ilfov County, Romania
- Education: Dorohoi Seminary; Chișinău Seminary
- Alma mater: Cernăuți Faculty of Theology
- Occupations: Priest, theologist, monk
- Years active: 1942–2017
- Employer: Romanian Orthodox Church
- Known for: Longevity, rebuilding and maintaining the Turbați Monastery
- Spouse: Olga Dimitriu
- Children: 2
- Awards: Patriarchal Cross of Romania

Nicanor Lemne (27 December 1915 – 15 September 2017) was a Romanian priest, theologist and monk who was known for his longevity. He served at the Church of the Nativity of the Mother of God, a place of worship repaired and maintained by the father himself, in the footsteps of the former Turbați Monastery in Siliștea Snagovului. He was a disciple of Arsenie Boca.

== Early life ==
Father Nicanor Lemne was born on 27 December 1915, in the town of Drepcăuți in the then Russian Bessarabia Governorate, in a large Romanian family with a priestly tradition, being one of the ten children of the family of priest Nicon and priestess Maria Lemne. Wanting from childhood to embrace priestly servanthood, he acquired a solid theological formation at the Theological Seminary of Dorohoi until 1933, then at the Theological Seminary in Chișinău until 1937 and finally at the renowned Faculty of Orthodox Theology in Cernăuți, which he graduated in 1941.

== Ordination and departure from Bessarabia ==
In 1942, he was ordained as a priest in Bălți County, at a parish in the commune of Mihăileni, where he served until 25 March 1944, when the Soviet Union reoccupied Bessarabia. From that moment began a difficult period for the father's family, who fled to Romania, living for a few months in the municipality of Râmnicu Vâlcea, after which he was appointed priest at the Turbați Parish in Siliștea Snagovului, Ilfov, in the Ilfov Nord Protoiery.
