= Briceni =

City in Drochia District, Moldova

- City
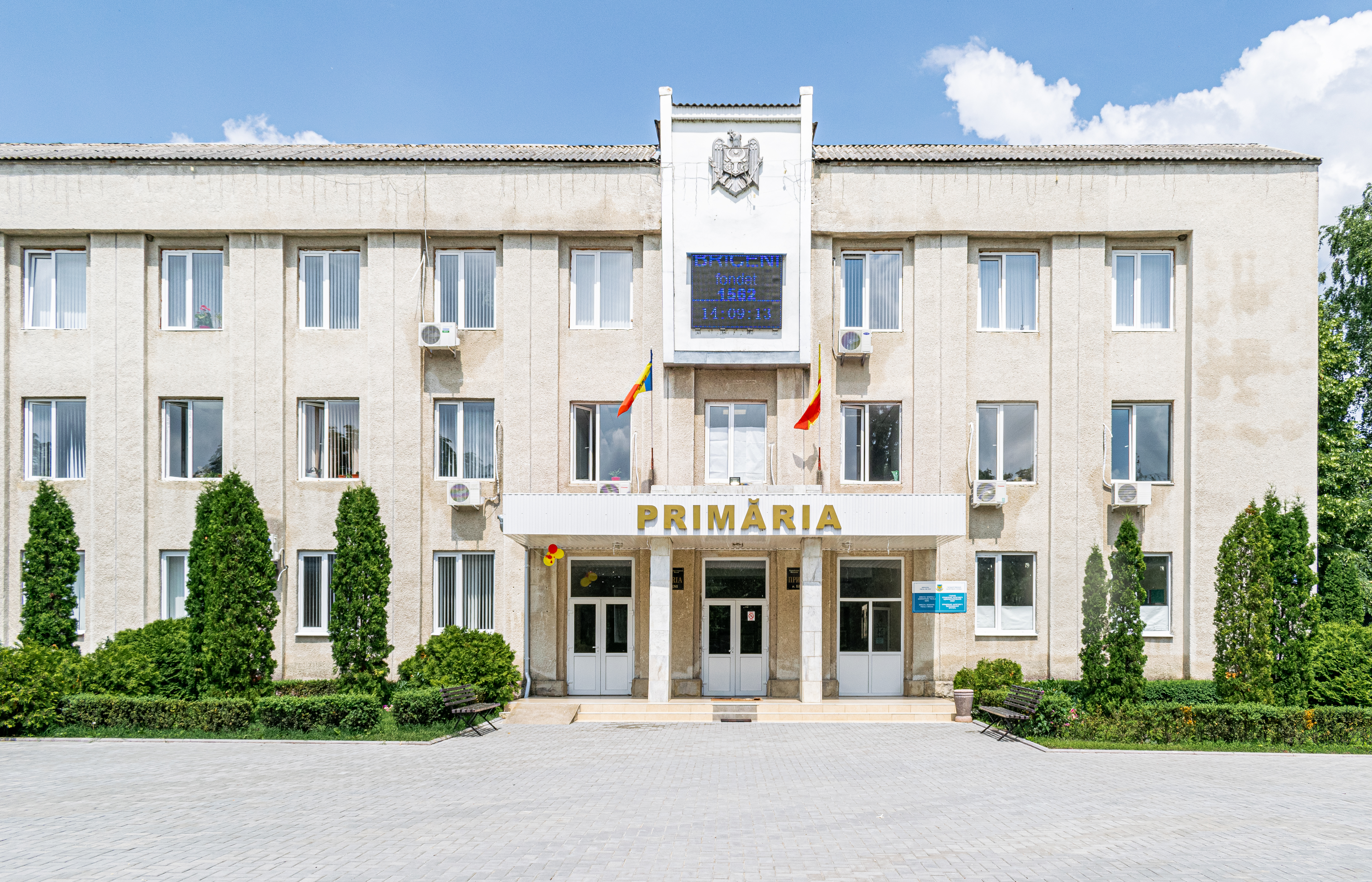
- Briceni City Hall

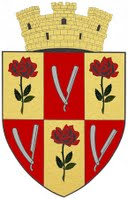
- Flag Seal

- Location within Moldova
- Coordinates: 48°21′40″N 27°05′02″E
- Country: Moldova
- district: Briceni District

Area
  - Total: 10 km^{2} (3.9 sq mi)
- Elevation: 39 m (128 ft)

Population (2014)
  - Total: 7,314
  - Density: 730/km^{2} (1,900/sq mi)
- Time zone: UTC+2 (EET)
  - Summer (DST): UTC+3 (EEST)
- Climate: Dfb

Briceni (Romanian pronunciation: [briˈt͡ʃenʲ]) (formerly Briceni-Târg, Yiddish: בריטשאן, romanized: Britshan, Polish: Bryczany) is a city in northern Moldova. It is the seat of Briceni District.

== Demographics ==
At the 2004 census, the city had a population of 8,765. At the 1930 census, there were two localities: Briceni Târg (literally Briceni Fair), and Briceni Sat (literally Briceni village), and at the time they were part of Plasa Briceni of Hotin County.

Ethnic composition
Ethnic group	1930 census		2004 census	2014 census
Ethnic group	Briceni Târg	Briceni Sat	2004 census	2014 census
Moldovans	-	-	3,344	3,165
Romanians	57	153	67	254
Jews	5,354	63	52	N/A
Ruthenians and Ukrainians	144	2,773	4,271	2,719
Russians	52	98	737	551
Gypsies	–	–	185	106
Bulgarians	1	–	26	15
Gagauzians	–	–	14	14
Poles	10	64	3	62
Germans	2	8	66	62
Greeks	5	–	66	62
Hungarians	–	1	66	62
others	–	–	66	62
Total	5,625	3,160	8,765	7,314

Native language
Language	1930 census		2004 census
Language	Briceni Târg	Briceni Sat	2004 census
Romanian	64	123	N/A
Yiddish	5,348	63	N/A
Ukrainian	123	2,790	N/A
Russian	83	162	N/A
Polish	–	16	N/A
German	6	6	N/A
Bulgarian	1	–	N/A
others	–	–	N/A
Total	5,625	3,160	8,765

== Etymology ==
The town has been also called: Berchan, Bricheni, Bricheni Târg, Bricheni Sat, Britchan, Britchani, Britsiteni.

A village, approximately 50 kilometres (30 mi) to the east to the city, is also known as Briceni. It is at 48° 22´ north latitude and 27° 42´ east longitude, which puts that town 174 km (108 mi) north northwest of Chişinău.

== Climate ==
Briceni has a warm-summer humid continental climate (Köppen: Dfb), characteristic to northern Moldova, with cold winters and warm summers. The city experiences considerable seasonal temperature variation. The absolute maximum temperature recorded at the Briceni meteorological station was 38.5 °C (16 July 2024), while the absolute minimum reached −33.8 °C (20 January 1963).

Precipitation is unevenly distributed throughout the year, with the largest amounts generally occurring during the warmer months. During the 1991–2020 reference period, the average annual precipitation recorded in Briceni was approximately 618 mm. Average seasonal precipitation amounted to about 237 mm in summer, 144 mm in spring, 142 mm in autumn, and 95 mm in winter.

Climatic observations also indicate a long-term increase in average temperatures and a decline in annual precipitation. At the same time, potential evapotranspiration has increased, contributing to greater seasonal water stress in the region.

Climate data for Briceni (1991–2020, extremes 1944–present)
Month	Jan	Feb	Mar	Apr	May	Jun	Jul	Aug	Sep	Oct	Nov	Dec	Year
Record high °C (°F)	14.0 (57.2)	20.2 (68.4)	26.2 (79.2)	30.6 (87.1)	33.5 (92.3)	35.9 (96.6)	38.5 (101.3)	37.4 (99.3)	36.4 (97.5)	30.2 (86.4)	22.0 (71.6)	15.4 (59.7)	38.5 (101.3)
Mean daily maximum °C (°F)	−0.3 (31.5)	1.8 (35.2)	7.7 (45.9)	15.5 (59.9)	21.3 (70.3)	24.6 (76.3)	26.6 (79.9)	26.3 (79.3)	20.6 (69.1)	13.8 (56.8)	6.6 (43.9)	1.0 (33.8)	13.8 (56.8)
Daily mean °C (°F)	−3.1 (26.4)	−1.6 (29.1)	3.1 (37.6)	9.9 (49.8)	15.4 (59.7)	18.9 (66.0)	20.7 (69.3)	20.2 (68.4)	14.9 (58.8)	9.1 (48.4)	3.4 (38.1)	−1.6 (29.1)	9.1 (48.4)
Mean daily minimum °C (°F)	−5.7 (21.7)	−4.5 (23.9)	−0.7 (30.7)	4.9 (40.8)	10.0 (50.0)	13.7 (56.7)	15.4 (59.7)	14.7 (58.5)	10.1 (50.2)	5.3 (41.5)	0.8 (33.4)	−4.0 (24.8)	5.0 (41.0)
Record low °C (°F)	−33.8 (−28.8)	−28.9 (−20.0)	−21.4 (−6.5)	−13.0 (8.6)	−3.8 (25.2)	1.6 (34.9)	5.5 (41.9)	4.0 (39.2)	−4.5 (23.9)	−10.4 (13.3)	−19.2 (−2.6)	−27.5 (−17.5)	−33.8 (−28.8)
Average precipitation mm (inches)	29 (1.1)	33 (1.3)	32 (1.3)	44 (1.7)	68 (2.7)	87 (3.4)	95 (3.7)	55 (2.2)	57 (2.2)	44 (1.7)	41 (1.6)	33 (1.3)	618 (24.3)
Average precipitation days (≥ 1.0 mm)	7	7	7	7	9	9	9	6	7	7	7	8	88
Average relative humidity (%)	85	83	79	68	67	70	71	72	74	78	86	87	77
Mean monthly sunshine hours	63	87	144	204	270	287	301	286	202	140	67	58	2,103
Source 1: NOAA
Source 2: Serviciul Hidrometeorologic de Stat (extremes, relative humidity)

== Jewish community ==
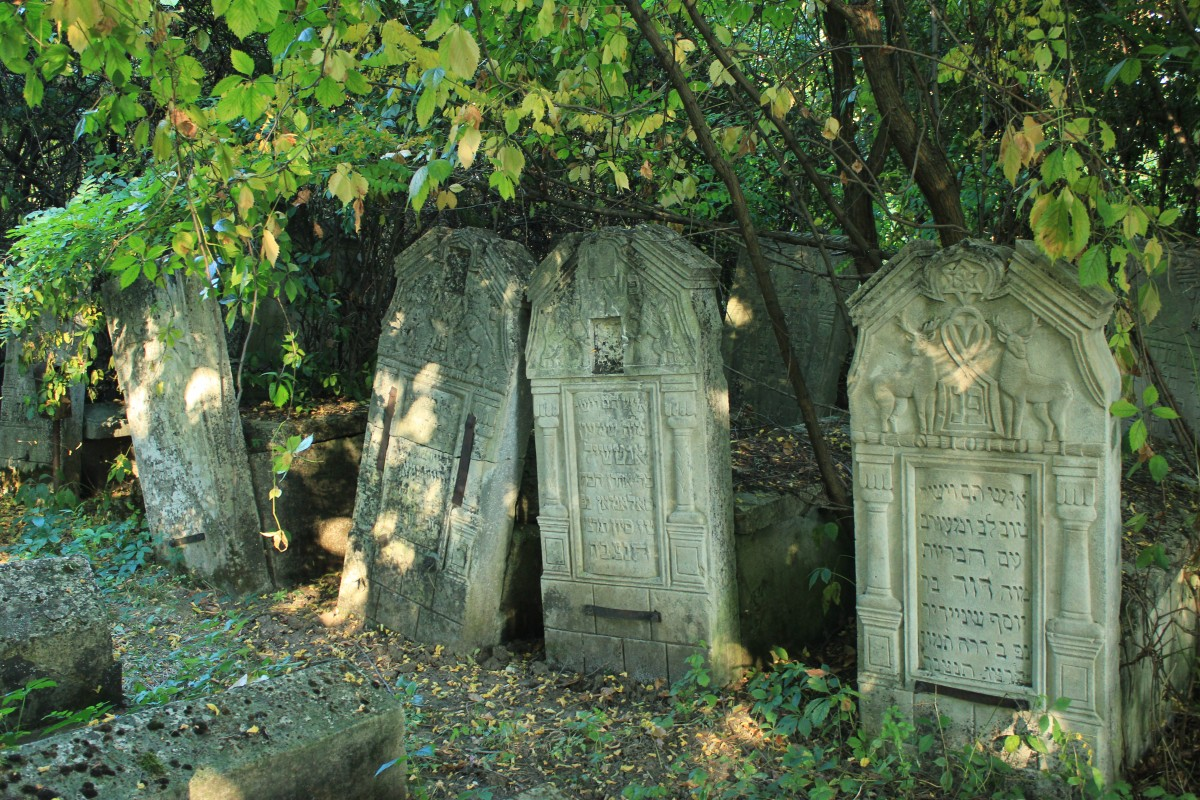
Tomb stones at the Jewish cemetery in Briceni

1817	The town (then a fair) had 137 Jewish families. Another 47 had previously left when the village was partly destroyed by fire.
1847	Jewish school opened.
1850	Briceni had one of the largest Jewish communities in Bessarabia.
1885	Jewish hospital founded.
1897	There were 7,184 Jews in Bricheni (96.5% of the total population)
1898	The town had 7,303 Jews out of a total population of 8,094. There were 972 Jewish artisans, most of whom were furriers who produced and exported up to 25,000 fur overcoats and caps per year. 25 families were dedicated to gardening and to producing tobacco. About 700 Jews were day laborers, earning 10–30 kopeck per day.
1924	125 Jews were occupied in agriculture on 64 km^{2} (approx. 1,600 acres) of land, most of it (5 km^{2}) held on lease.
1930	5354 Jews (95.2% of the total population). There was a Hebrew Tarbut school.
1940	Jewish population grew to about 10,000.
June, 1940	Briceni, along with the rest of Bessarabia was occupied by the USSR. Most Jewish property and community buildings were confiscated. The only synagogue was saved because the Soviets decided to use it as a granary. About 80 Jews, mostly community leaders, were exiled to Siberia.
July 8, 1941	German & Romanian troops passed through the town, murdering many Jews. Jews from the neighboring towns of Lipcani (then Lipcani Târg) and Sokyriany (then Secureni Târg) were brought to Briceni.
July 28, 1941	All Jews were dispatched across the river Dniester (outside Bessarabia) and several were shot en route. When they arrived in Mohyliv-Podilskyi, the Germans "selected" the old people and forced the younger ones to dig graves for them. From Mohyliv-Podilskyi the rest were turned back to Otaci and then on to Secureni-Târg. Hundreds died en route. For a month they stayed in the ghetto there, only to be deported again to Transnistria in late 1941. All the young Jews were murdered in a forest near Soroca.
After 1945	Only about 1,000 Jews returned to Briceni at the end of the World War II.

The Jewish cemetery of Briceni contains some 3,250 remaining tombstones though it is heavily overgrown and many are illegible. It is located in the eastern vicinities of the town, left of the road R11 leading to Ocnița.

== Natives ==
- Israel Berstein (1926–1991), Romanian-American mathematician
- Vladislav Lungu (born 1977), Moldovan footballer
- Anastasiya Markovich (born 1979), Ukrainian painter

== History ==
On 5 December 2022, during a Russian bombing campaign against Ukraine during the 2022 Russian invasion of Ukraine, a missile fell within the borders of Moldova into an orchard near Briceni. On 16 February 2023, another missile fell into the village of Larga. As a result of this incident, residents of Briceni expressed fear.

== Media ==
- Radio Chișinău 102,6 FM

== International relations ==
=== Twin Towns – Sister Cities ===
Briceni is twinned with:

- Rădăuți, Romania
