= Corpaci =

- Village
- Location within Edineț
- Coordinates: 48°0′29″N 27°8′19″E
- Country: Moldova

Government
  - Mayor: Veaceslav Uja (PLDM)
- Elevation: 126 m (413 ft)

Population (2014 census)
  - Total: 1,140
- Time zone: UTC+2 (EET)
  - Summer (DST): UTC+3 (EEST)
- Postal code: MD-4624

Corpaci is a village in Edineț District, Moldova.
