= Tețcani =

- Village
- Location within Moldova
- Coordinates: 48.1816666667°N 26.9755555556°E
- Country: Moldova
- District: Briceni District

Government
  - Mayor: Alexei Scutelnic (PLDM)

Population (2014 census)
  - Total: 2,654
- Time zone: UTC+2 (EET)
  - Summer (DST): UTC+3 (EEST)

Tețcani is a village in Briceni District, Moldova.
