= Berlinți =

- Commune
- Location within Moldova
- Coordinates: 48°18′34″N 26°56′20″E
- Country: Moldova
- Elevation: 211 m (692 ft)

Population (2014)
  - Total: 1,913
- Time zone: UTC+2 (EET)
  - Summer (DST): UTC+3 (EEST)
- Postal code: MD-4713

Berlinți is a commune in Briceni District, Moldova. It is composed of two villages, Berlinți and Caracușenii Noi.

== History ==
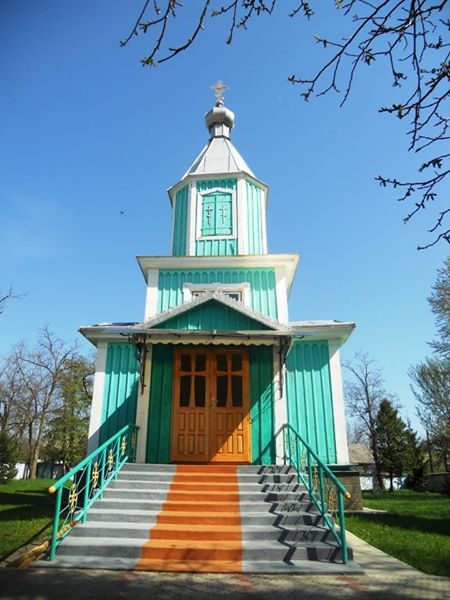
Orthodox church in Berlinți

On July 7, 1941 the entire Jewish population of the town was murdered in a massacre by Nazi Germany. A small memorial for the massacre was built in 1952.

In October 2021 a drunk driver rammed his car into a man inside the village, killing him. The incident was reportedly intentional.

== Demography ==
According to the 2004 census, the ethnic make-up of the village goes as following:

Ethnic group	Population	% Share of population
Ukrainian	1.356	86.98%
Moldovan / Români	175	11.23%
Russian	27	1.73%
Gagauz	1	0.06%
Total	1.559	100%
