= Bălcăuți, Briceni =

Bălcăuți
- Commune
- Location within Moldova
- Coordinates: 48°17′00″N 27°12′00″E
- Country: Moldova

Population (2014)
  - Total: 671
- Time zone: UTC+2 (EET)
  - Summer (DST): UTC+3 (EEST)
- Postal code: MD-4712

Bălcăuți is a commune in Briceni District, Moldova. It is composed of two villages, Bălcăuți and Bocicăuți.
