= Larga, Briceni =

Larga
- Commune and village
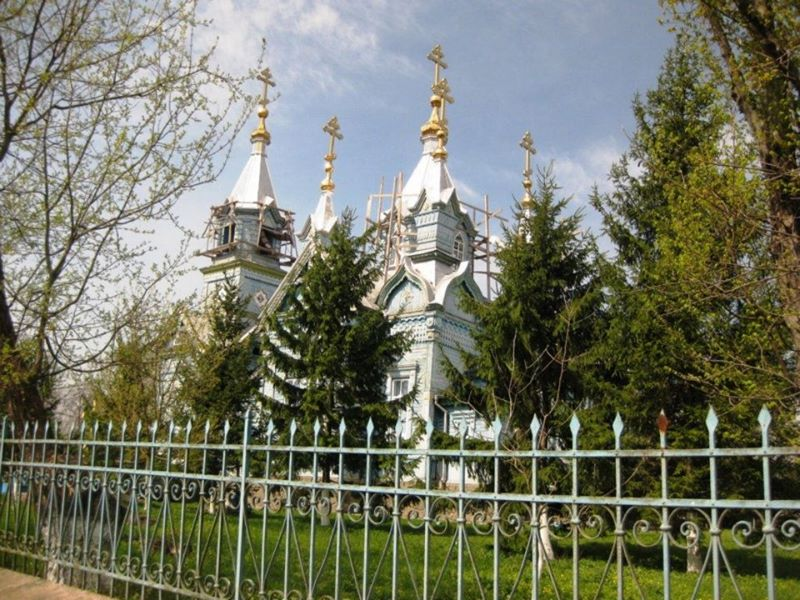
- Holy Trinity church in Larga

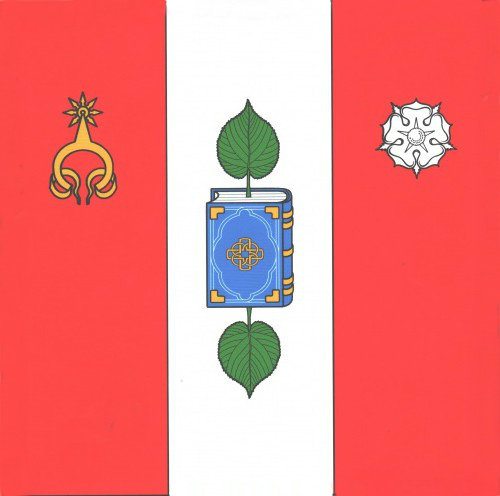
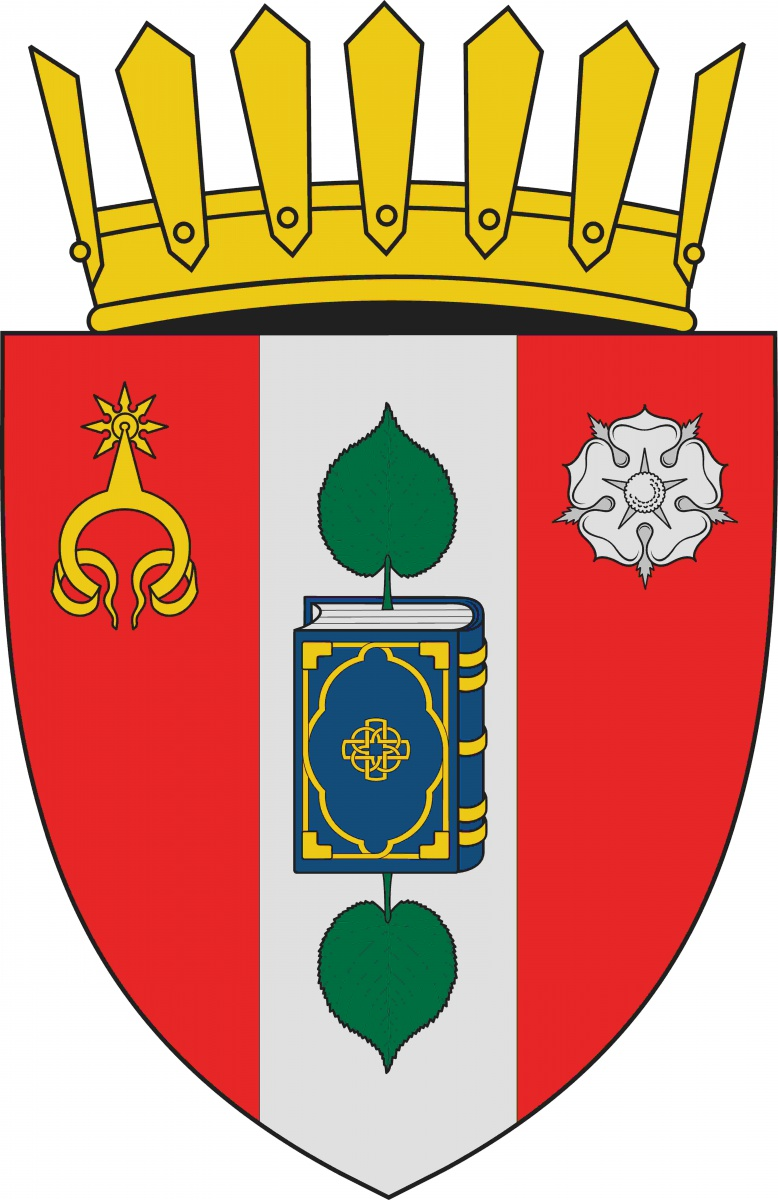
- Flag Coat of arms
- Interactive map of Larga
- Location in Moldova
- Coordinates: 48°22′20″N 26°50′36″E
- Country: Moldova
- District: Briceni District
- Established: 1492

Area
  - Total: 20.7 sq mi (53.6 km^{2})
- Elevation: 794 ft (242 m)

Population (2014)
  - Total: 1,477
  - Density: 71.4/sq mi (27.6/km^{2})
- Time zone: UTC+2 (EET)
  - Summer (DST): UTC+3 (EEST)
- Postal code: MD-4731
- Area code: +373 247

Larga is a commune in Briceni District, in north-western Moldova. It is composed of two villages, Larga and Pavlovca.

== History ==
On 14 January 2023, during Russian strikes against Ukraine, Moldovan border police found missile debris in Larga. Moldovan airspace was violated as a result. Later, on 16 February, Moldovan police again found missile debris in Larga. Residents of the nearby town of Briceni expressed fear as a result.

== Notable people ==
- Mihai Cimpoi
- Serafim Urechean
