= Colicăuți =

- Commune
- Location within Moldova
- Coordinates: 48°18′36″N 27°8′54″E
- Country: Moldova

Population (2014)
  - Total: 2,875
- Time zone: UTC+2 (EET)
  - Summer (DST): UTC+3 (EEST)
- Postal code: MD-4719

Colicăuți is a commune in Briceni District, Moldova. It is composed of two villages, Colicăuți and Trestieni.
