= Caracușenii Vechi =

- Village
- Location within Moldova
- Coordinates: 48°16′8″N 27°4′11″E
- Country: Moldova

Government
  - Mayor: Vladimir Jelaga (Independent)

Population (2014 census)
  - Total: 3,911
- Time zone: UTC+2 (EET)
  - Summer (DST): UTC+3 (EEST)
- Postal code: MD-4718

Caracușenii Vechi is a village in Briceni District, Moldova. First attested at 1585 May 2

On November 1, 2007, the population of the village was 4,222 inhabitants, of which 2,134 were able-bodied, 892 pensioners and 1,027 children under 16. The majority of the population are owners of private agricultural land.

The name Caracuș appears on November 21, 1772. The name supposedly comes from a raid by the Turks who devastated the village. The Turks were nicknamed "Caracuși-păsări negre".

Ethnic	Population	% Percentage
Moldovan / Romanian	4.146	98,76%
Ukrainian	25	0,6%
Russian	21	0,5%
Hebrew	3	0,07%
Bulgarian	2	0,05%
Other	1	0,02%
Total	4.198	100%
