= Criva, Briceni =

Criva
- Village
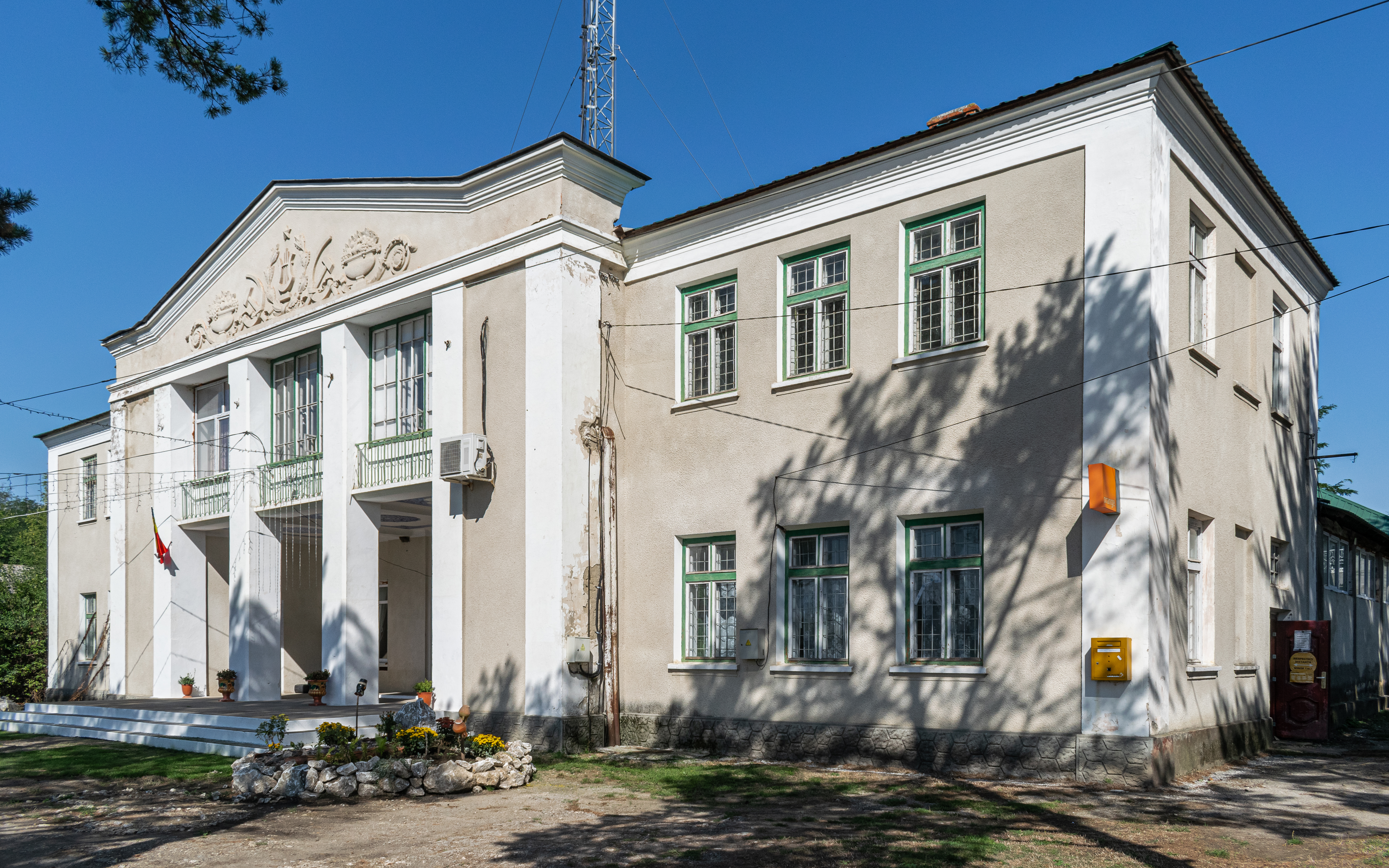
- Criva Palace of Culture
- Interactive map of Criva
- Location in Moldova
- Coordinates: 48°16′N 26°40′E
- Country: Moldova
- District: Briceni District

Population (2014 census)
  - Total: 1,431
- Time zone: UTC+2 (EET)
  - Summer (DST): UTC+3 (EEST)

Criva is a village in Briceni District, Moldova.

It is the westernmost point in Moldova and a border crossing point to Mamalyha, Ukraine.

== See also ==
- Extreme points of Moldova
