= Lopatnic =

- Village
- Location within Edineț
- Coordinates: 48°8′5″N 27°3′24″E
- Country: Moldova

Government
  - Mayor: Alexandru Roșca (PCRM)
- Elevation: 155 m (509 ft)

Population (2014 census)
  - Total: 1,217
- Time zone: UTC+2 (EET)
  - Summer (DST): UTC+3 (EEST)
- Postal code: MD-4635

Lopatnic is a village in Edineț District, Moldova.
