= Briceni District =

Coordinates: 48°15′N 27°00′E

Briceni District Raionul Briceni
- District
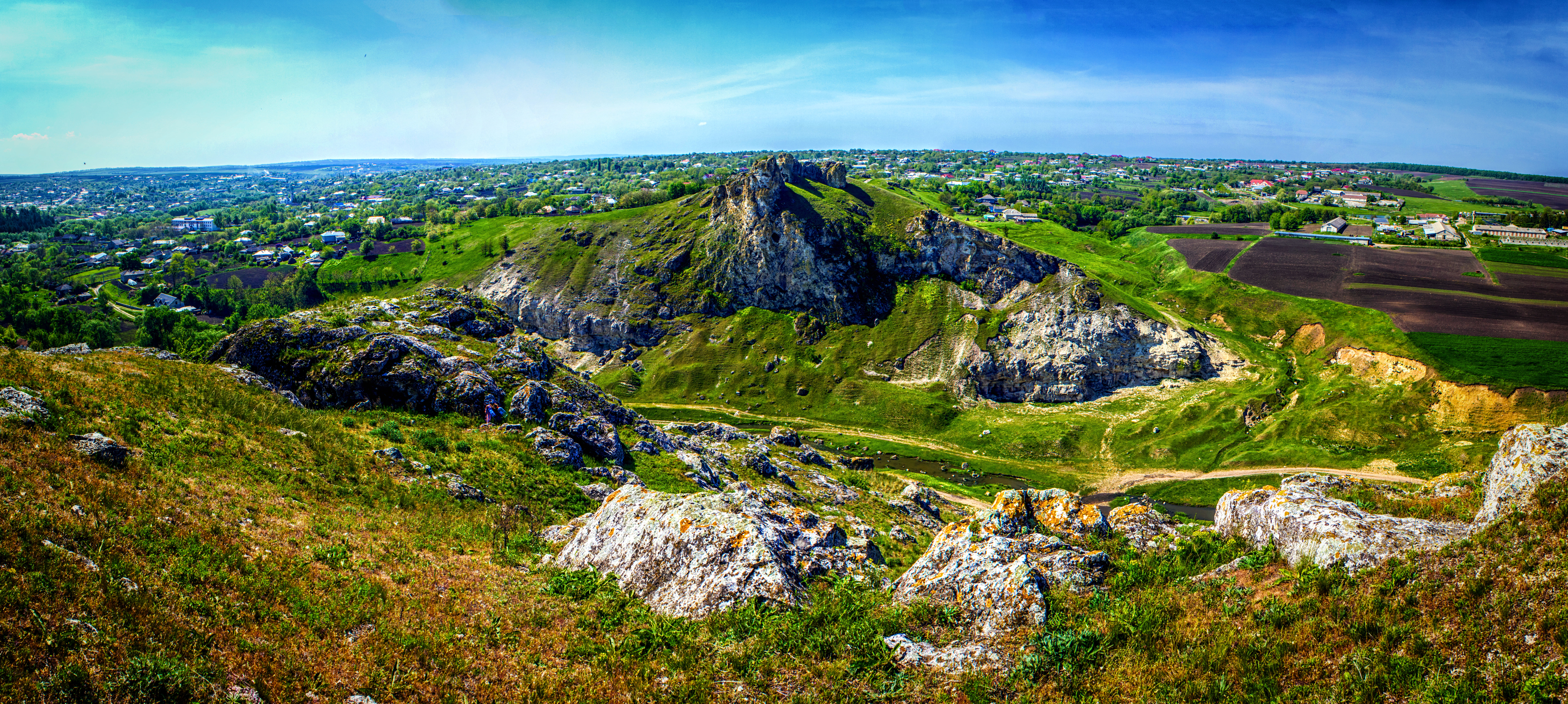
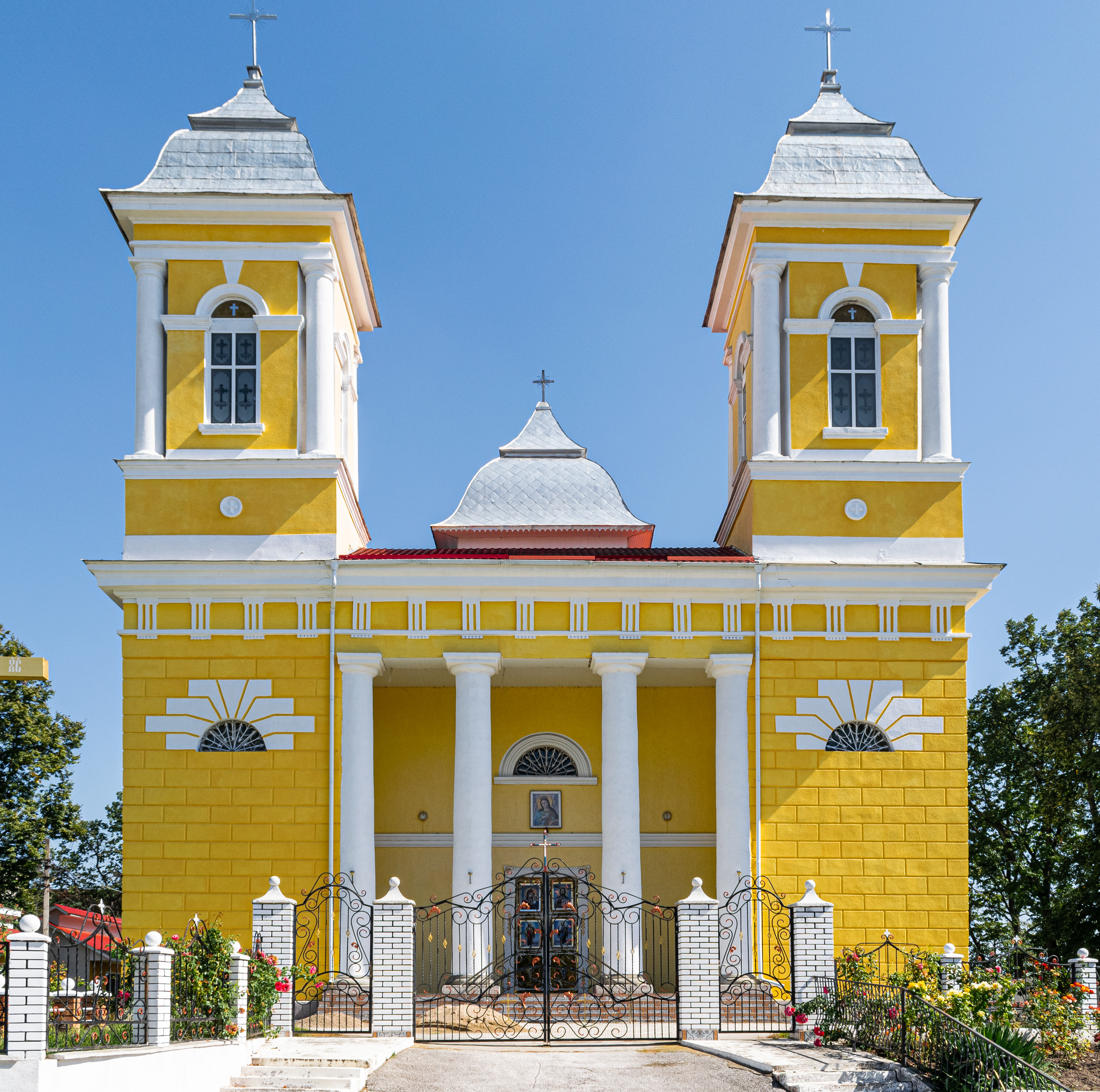
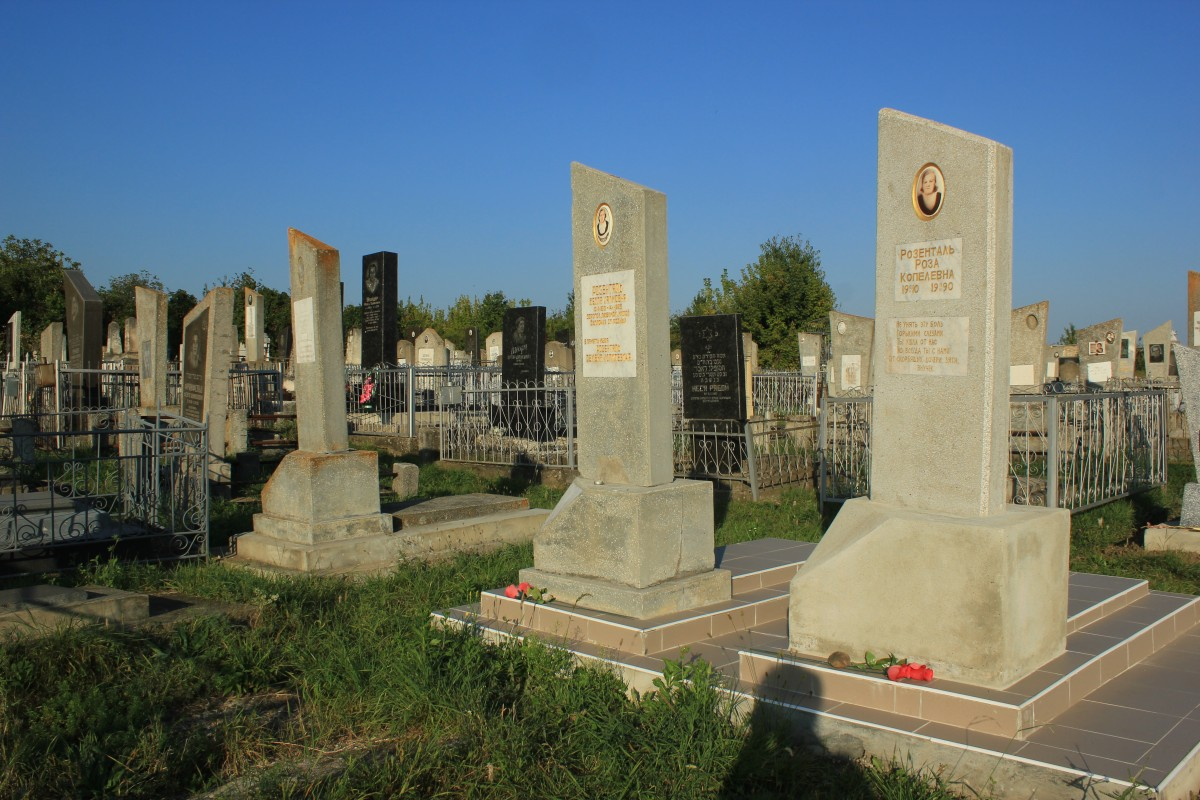
- From the top, Lopatnic Geologic complex, St Katherine Church, Briceni Jewish Cemetery

- Flag

- Country: Republic of Moldova
- Administrative center (oraș-reședință): Briceni
- Established: 2002

Government
  - Raion president: Dorin Pavaloi (PSRM, 2023)

Area
  - Total: 814 km^{2} (314 sq mi)
  - Water: 21 km^{2} (8.1 sq mi) 2.58%
- Elevation: 260 m (850 ft)

Population (2024)
  - Total: 46,894
  - Density: 57.6/km^{2} (149/sq mi)
- Time zone: UTC+2 (EET)
  - Summer (DST): UTC+3 (EEST)
- Area code: +373 47
- Car plates: BR
- Website: www.briceni.md

Briceni (Romanian pronunciation: [briˈtʃenʲ]) is a district (Romanian: raion) in the north-west of Moldova, with the administrative center at Briceni. The other major city is Lipcani. As of January 1, 2011, its population was 75,300.

== History ==
The first documentary attestation dates back to district towns June 17, 1429. Such localities: Lipcani, Larga, Mihăileni, Șirăuți are mentioned first in the period 1429–1433. In July 1429, reign of Moldova Alexander the Good Dan Uncleata had established him several villages in the region of the district today. In 1562 is first attested Briceni city under the name of the land Adicăuți, Hotin, which gave him his Despot Voda to Vartic. Lipcani Tatars in 1699 are displaced living in the city which they called, being displaced to Kamianets-Podilskyi. In 1788 Austrian military administration Briceni found in 56 households. In 1812 after the Treaty of Bucharest, Moldova is occupied by Russian Empire in the period 1812-1918 as the district is under Russian administration. In 1877 the region is experiencing an epidemic of plague. In 1882 a drought strikes the district. In 1897 the city population Briceni of 7446, 96.5% were Jewish. In 1918 with the Union of Bessarabia with Romania entering the land Hotin district region. In 1940 the Molotov–Ribbentrop Pact with Bessarabia Briceni is occupied by the USSR. In 2004 the population was 78.400 inhabitants of the district.

== Geography ==
Located in the extreme northwest of the Republic of Moldova, the district borders Ukraine in the north, Ocnița District in the east, Edineț District in the south, and Romania in the west, across the river Prut. Criva village located in the district is the western point of the Republic of Moldova coordinates: 48 ° 16'20 "N 26 ° 40'23" E. District located on the Plateau of Moldavia, has a relief with a mean fragmentation. With a low land sliding process. Maximum altitude in the district is located near the village Bălcăuți, reaching heights of 260 m.

The "Toltrele Prutului" is a chain of limestone formations in the southwestern part of the district, crossed by the rivers Vilia and Lopatnic. Although they are subject to human intervention Toltrel preserves a significant part of its former beauty, left a legacy of the Sarmatian sea and Tortona sea, 15-20 million years ago.

=== Climate ===
The climate is temperate with rainfall district 600–650 mm high, sometimes 800 mm and average temperature of 8 °C (46 °F). In summer the average temperature is 19.5 °C (67 °F), in winter −5.5 °C (22 °F). After the national average district has the highest annual amount of precipitation.

=== Emil Racoviță Cave ===
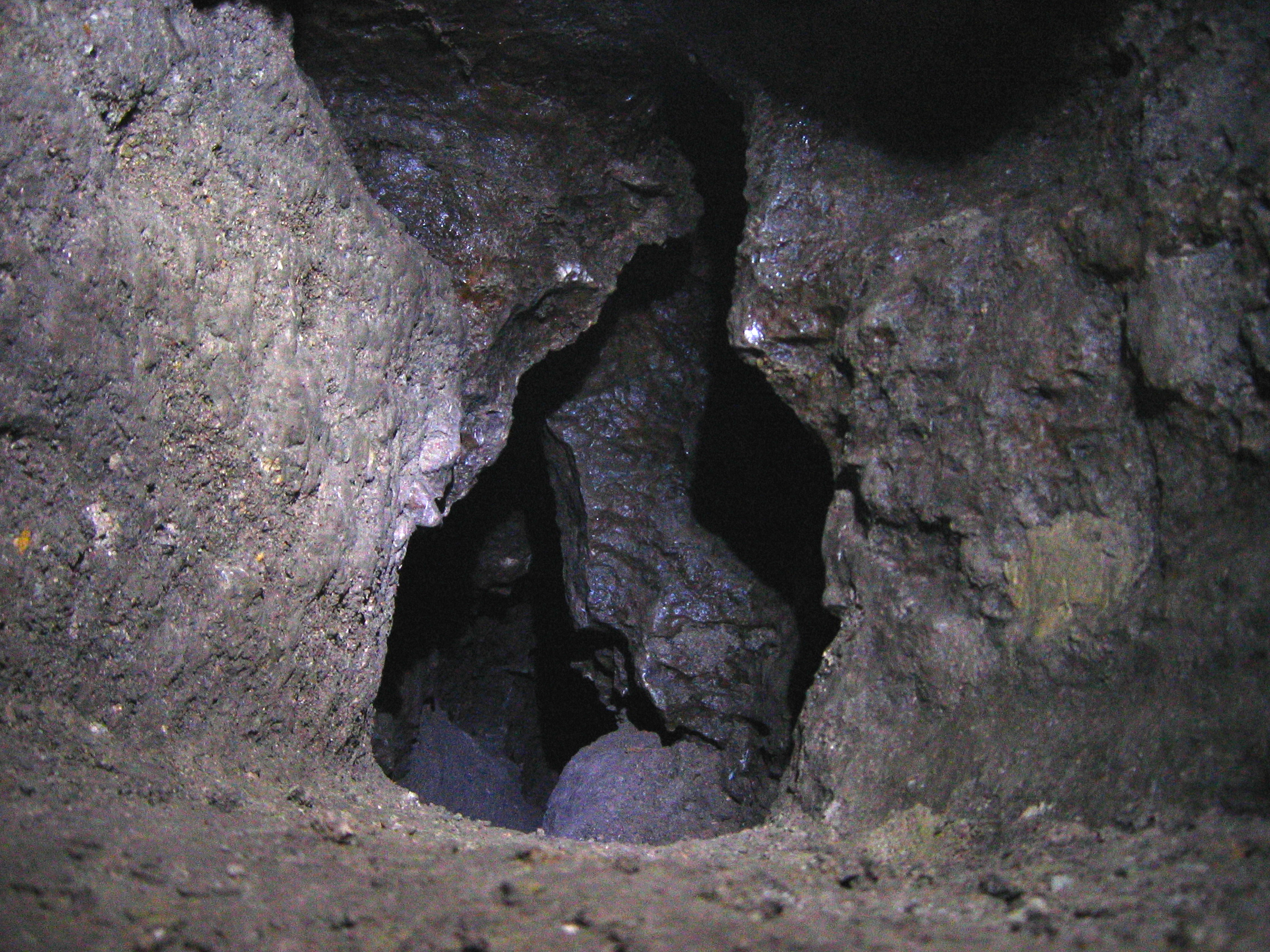
Emil Racoviță cave excavation

Situated in the extreme northwest of Moldova, Emil Racoviță Cave has a total length of 90.2 km underground labyrinths, is the third largest gypsum cave in Europe. It was discovered in 1959 after an explosion in the village Criva gypsum quarry. In 1977 the first scientific investigations are undertaken. In 1991 Moldova adopted the Government Decision no. 664 "On state protection of karst cave near the village of Criva." Cave is the labyrinth, the cave is СО2 concentration increased in some areas reaching up to 2-4%. Galleries, most of them have walls covered with fine clays of different colors in total agreement with shades of white, pink, red, black or blue covering plaster walls. Contrast increased and two deep wells which, together with over 20 underground lakes, form a unique ensemble created by nature.

=== Fauna ===
Fauna of the district is typical of European forest steppe, characterized by: hare, hedgehog, squirrel, fox, stone marten, weasel, less deer, wild boar, badger and rarely elk. Of birds, there are: skylark, blackbird, quail, stork, starling, less partridges and pheasant.

=== Flora ===
Forests occupy 10.0% of district. There are: English oak, maple, birch and mugwort. Of plants, there are: fescue, nettle, clover, peony and more.

=== Rivers ===
The main rivers that cross the district are: Vilia, Larga, Lopatnic (57 km), but rivers Racovăț (68 km) and Draghiște (67 km) crossing in the upper. Briceni District is in the Prut river basin. Most lakes are of artificial origin.

=== Protected areas ===
- Complex geology and paleontology of the Lopatnic river basin (CGPRL)
- Emil Racovita Cave
- Rososeni Natural Reserve
- Tețcani Landscape Reserve

== Administrative subdivisions ==
Administrative map of Briceni district

- Localities: 39
  - Administrative Center: Briceni
    - Cities: Briceni, Lipcani
      - Villages: 11
        - Communes: 26

== Demographics ==
1 January 2012 the district population was 74,700 of which 20.6% urban and 79.4% rural population.

- Births (2010): 800 (10.6 per 1000)
- Deaths (2010): 1200 (15.9 per 1000)
- Growth Rate (2010): -400 (-5.3 per 1000)

=== Ethnic groups ===
Ethnic group	% of total
Moldovans *	72.6
Ukrainians	22.5
Russians	2.3
Romanians *	2.0
Romani	0.2
Gagauz	0.1
Bulgarians	0.1
Other	0.3
Undeclared	1.21

=== Religion ===
Religion	Adherents (2004)	% of total (2004)	Adherents (2014)	% of total (2014)
Christianity: (total)	65,431	83.82%		
Orthodox Christians	62,181	79.69%	49,958	
Protestants: (total)	3,218	4.12%		
→Jehovah's Witnesses	−	−	4,660	
→Pentecostals	1,796	2.30%	2,221	
→Evangelicals	84	0.11%	622	
→Baptists	794	1.02%	579	
→Seventh-day Adventists	520	0.67%	418	
Other religions	6,184	7.92%	93	
Atheists	132	0.17%	77	
No religion	3,269	4.18%	−	−
Undeclared	3,011	3.86%	11,962	

== Economy ==
Briceni District in the National Development Complex of the Republic of Moldova, is presented as an agrarian-industrial district. In 2004, 20,000 were active economic agents, including industrial enterprises of 1070, 18,000 peasant farms, joint stock companies 27, 185 limited liability companies, cooperatives 32, 20 trade enterprises, 19 state companies, insurance associations 20 associations households peasant 2 and budgetary organizations 186.

=== Agriculture ===
Agriculture is the main economic branch of the district dominated by increasing crops such as sugar beet and tobacco. And cereal crops: wheat, barley and oats. Orchards have an important part of global agricultural production is grown mainly district: apple, cherry, plum and more.

== Transportation ==
Transportation Briceni is divided between transport drivers transporting people and goods to introduce lesser extent, its main routes are inter-district, Chișinău, Bălți and Chernovtsy. Rail node is based on Lipcani ensure primarily to carry goods and fuel.

== Politics ==
As in other northern districts of the North Red in the last election in the Party of Communists of the Republic of Moldova gathered during 2001–2009 over 50% of votes. But the elections of 2010, Communists won the elections with only 0.26% AEI.

During the last three elections AEI had an increase of 91.7%.

=== Elections ===
Parliament elections results
Year	AEI	PCRM
2010	46.97% 16,045	47.23% 16,132
July 2009	38.59% 13,586	57.61% 20,281
April 2009	24.64% 8,367	64.07% 21,750

Summary of 28 November 2010 Parliament of Moldova election results in Briceni District
Parties and coalitions	Votes	%	+/−
Party of Communists of the Republic of Moldova	16,132	47.23	−10.38
Democratic Party of Moldova	7,245	21,21	+6.58
Liberal Democratic Party of Moldova	5,964	17.46	+7.86
Liberal Party	1,468	4.30	−2.97
Party Alliance Our Moldova	1,368	4.00	−3.09
Social Democratic Party	615	1.80	+0.48
Other Party	1,348	3.91	+0.11
Total (turnout 59.00%)	34,484	100.00	

== Culture ==
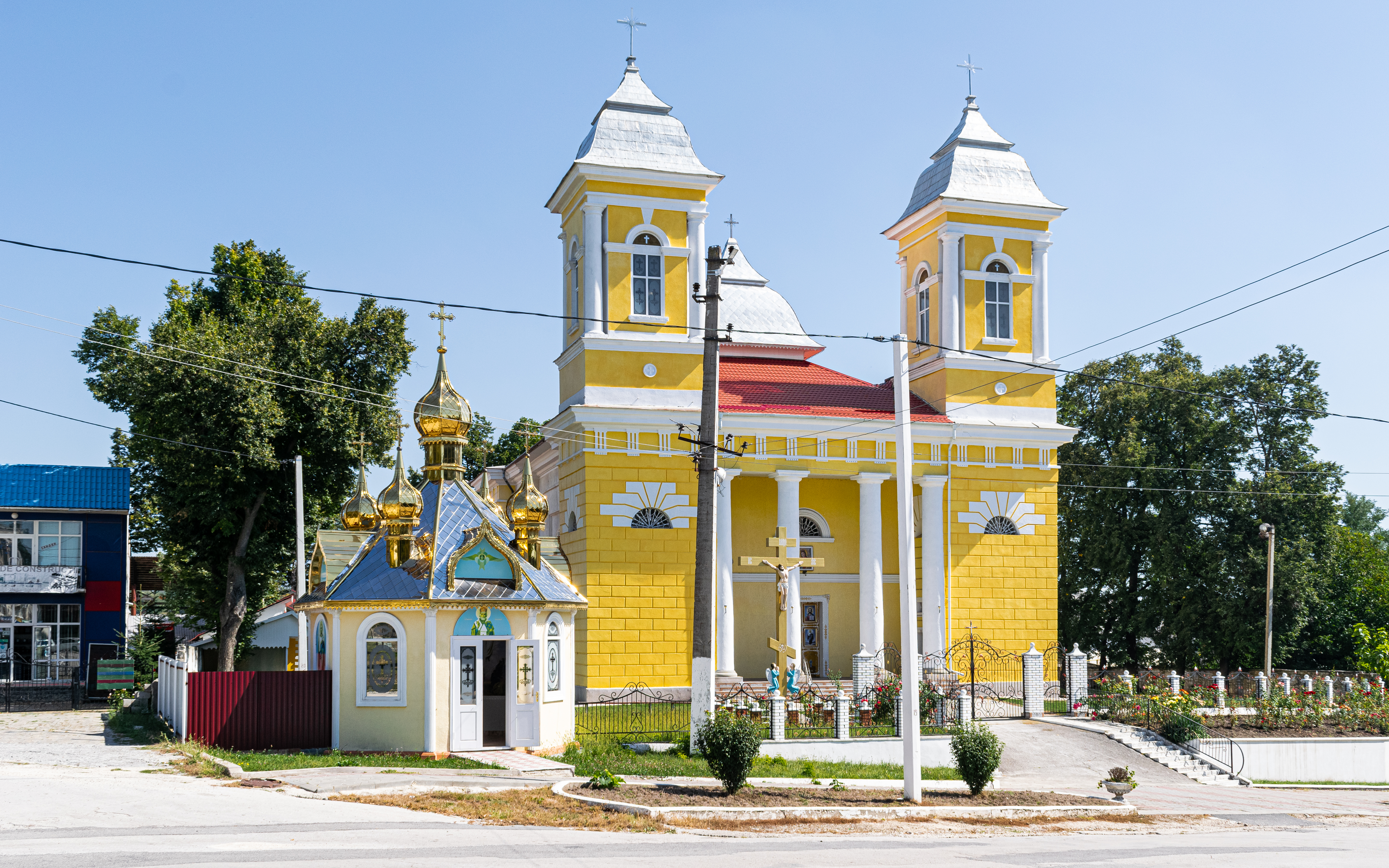
Church in Lipcani

The district operates 31 houses and homes of culture, 32 public libraries, five schools of arts education, which includes 154 employees. Most houses, libraries, art schools have a good basic material, cultural institutions headquarters remain in an exemplary cleaning. Most cultural events are organized by the homes of culture, library and music school in the village of Larga, the homes of culture in the villages Drepcăuți, Balasinești, Tețcani. Noted that a number of artistic groups, who the honorary title "model" of rural district participated in various festivals, competitions, both national, and international. Dances from the village collectives and wide band "Izvoras" village Colicăuți became winners of the 32nd edition of "La hore hearth." Vocal-instrumental ensemble "Amor" village festival Drepcăuți became laureate of contest "harmonies fall." Recently, the folk dance team "Marinca" from the village participated in international festival Larga choreography "Vesennie arabeski" held in the Luhansk Oblast, Ukraine, where he won the title of laureate of the prestigious international festival. In district 28 artistic groups working with the honorary title "model".

== Sport ==
In Briceni District registered 196 sports facilities and two stadiums: those of Larga and Drepcăuți. In Briceni began renovated stadium. Specialized finishes Olympic Boxing Centre in the village Grimăncăuți. In 29 sports halls and courts have held 160 training and sports competitions. Good results are recorded by the School no. 2 Briceni schools Grimăncăuți, Medveja, other. Medveja School performance results have Grimăncăuți boxers, Briceni (coach Peter Caduc obsolete master emeritus in sport). In the period 1979-2004 were trained 30 champions of the republic among the juniors and cadets. School has given over 30 national championships between junior champions. Were training 7 medals at the European Championships, European Cups and the Olympics. The highest recorded performance was by Vitalie Grușac, who won a bronze medal at the Sydney Olympics (2000) and qualified for the 2004 Summer Olympic Games in Athens.

== Personalities ==
- Grigore Vieru - Poet, member of the Romanian Academy in 2003
- Marian Lupu - Politician (PDM), Democratic Party chairman of 2009, President of the Republic of Moldova from 2010
- Serafim Urechean - Politician (PLDM), Mayor of Chisinau in the period 1994–2005, president of the Party Alliance Our Moldova (2003–2011)
- Veaceslav Gojan - Boxer, bronze medalist in 2008 Olympic
- Vitalie Grusac - Boxer, bronze medalist in 2000 Olympics
- Zinaida Greceanîi - Politician (PCRM), Prime Minister of Moldova (2008–2009)
- Stella Gherman - Politician (PCRM)
