= State Agrarian University of Moldova =

University in Chișinău, Moldova

Coordinates: 47.062°N 28.809°E

- Universitatea Agrară de Stat din Moldova
- Former name: M. V. Frunze Chișinău Agricultural Institute (1940–1991)
- Type: Public
- Active: 1933–2022
- Affiliations: Technical University of Moldova (since 2022)
- Location: Chișinău, Moldova

The State Agrarian University of Moldova (UASM; Romanian: Universitatea Agrară de Stat din Moldova) was a university located in Chișinău, Moldova. Founded in 1933, it merged with the Technical University of Moldova, integrating into its structures in 2022.

== Organization ==
The State Agrarian University of Moldova (SAUM) is the only higher agricultural education institution in the Republic of Moldova and the first higher education institution founded in Chișinău. SAUM has a history that began on 9 April 1933, when King Carol II of Romania promulgated the Law concerning the transformation of Agricultural Sciences Section of the University of Iași into the Faculty of Agricultural Sciences with its center in Chișinău. In 1938, the institution was renamed the Faculty of Agronomy and became administratively part of the newly established Gheorghe Asachi Polytechnic School.

In 1940, following the occupation of Bessarabia by the Soviet Union, the faculty from Chișinău became an independent institution as the Chișinău Agricultural Institute, with four faculties (from 1944): Agronomy, Viticulture, Horticulture, and Animal Sciences. Other faculties are established over time: Mechanization of Agriculture (1950), Land Improvements (1954), Agrarian Economics (1965), Veterinary Medicine (1976). In 1991, the name of the institution was changed to the State Agrarian University of Moldova.

At present, SAUM has over 6,000 undergraduate and postgraduate students trained in 23 specialties, 30 specializations, and 27 scientific specialties, respectively.

== Gallery ==
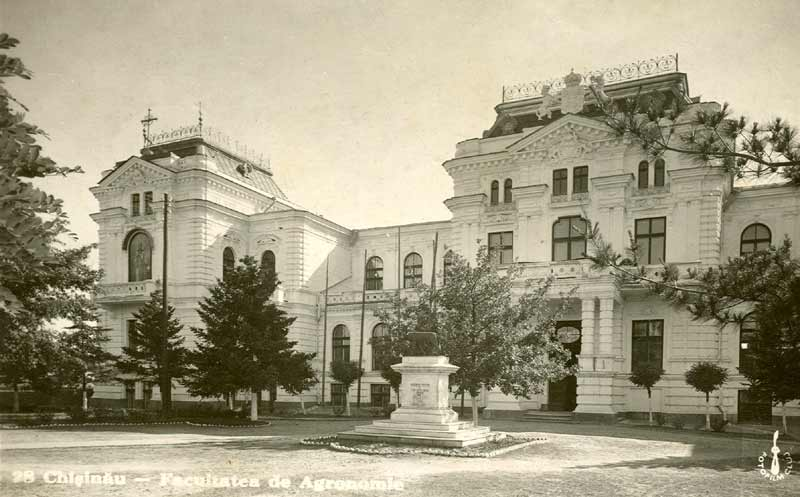
Sfatul Țării Palace was the first seat of the University in the 1930s

== Notable alumni ==
- Avigdor Lieberman, Israel's former foreign minister
- Igor Dodon, Moldova's fifth president
- Mircea Snegur, Moldova's first president
- Andrei Sangheli, Moldova's second prime minister

== See also ==
- List of universities in Moldova
- Education in Moldova
