= Nicolae Dandiș =

Moldovan lecturer (born 1981)

Mayor of Cahul
- Incumbent
- Assumed office 3 July 2015
- Preceded by: Petru Burlacu

Member of Cahul City Council
- In office 2007–2011

Personal details
- Born: 6 June 1981 (age 45)
- Party: Independent
- Education: State University of Moldova

Nicolae Dandiș (born June 6, 1981) is a Moldovan lecturer at Bogdan Petriceicu Hasdeu State University and social activist. Since July 2015 Mayor of Cahul, running as an independent candidate. He is considered a pro-European, centre-right politician. Bachelor of Administrative Science, Bachelor of Science in history, Master of Management and Public Policy, Political Science PhD.
