= Bogdan Petriceicu Hasdeu State University of Cahul =

- Universitatea de Stat „Bogdan Petriceicu Hasdeu” din Cahul
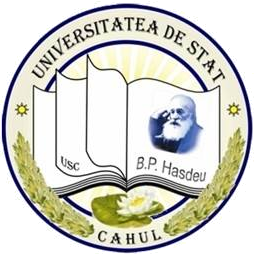
- Type: Public
- Established: 7 June 1999
- Academic staff: 106
- Students: 2,146
- Location: Cahul, Moldova; 45.9047°N 28.1958°E
- Website: http://www.usch.md/
- Location in Moldova

The Bogdan Petriceicu Hasdeu State University of Cahul (USC; Romanian: Universitatea de Stat „Bogdan Petriceicu Hasdeu” din Cahul) was a public university in Cahul, Moldova, founded in 1999. It was named in honor of the Romanian writer and philologist Bogdan Petriceicu Hasdeu.

In 2026, it merged with the Technical University of Moldova.

== Structure ==
=== Faculties ===
- Faculty of Law and Public Administration
- Faculty of Economy, Computer Science and Mathematics
- Faculty of Philology and History

=== Partnership agreement ===
- Cross–border Faculty of Humanities, Economic and Engineering Sciences, in collaboration with University of Galați - Romania

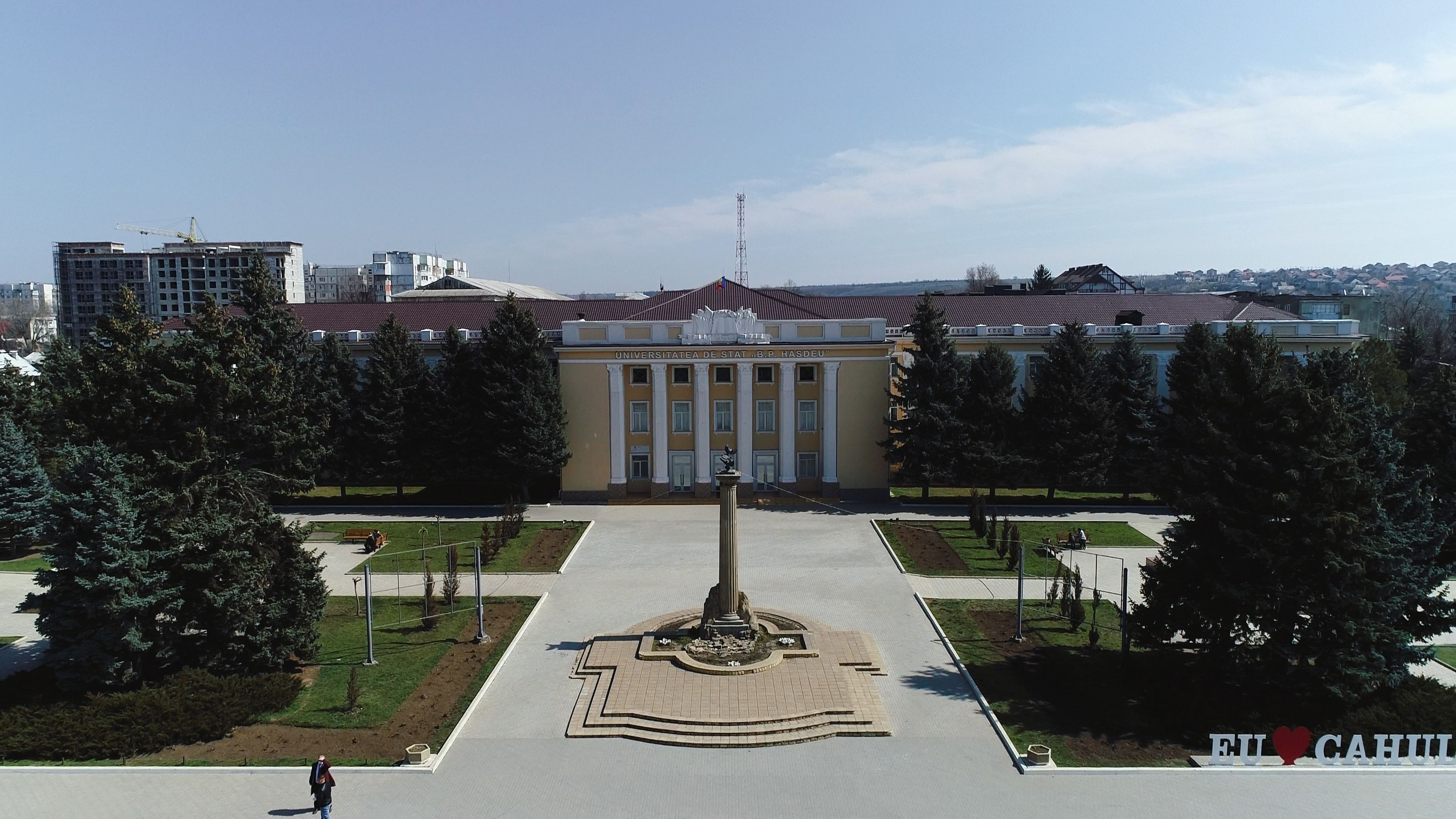

== See also ==
- List of universities in Moldova
- Education in Moldova
