= Alexandru cel Bun Military Academy =

Main military academy of Moldova

- Academia Militară a Forțelor Armate „Alexandru cel Bun”
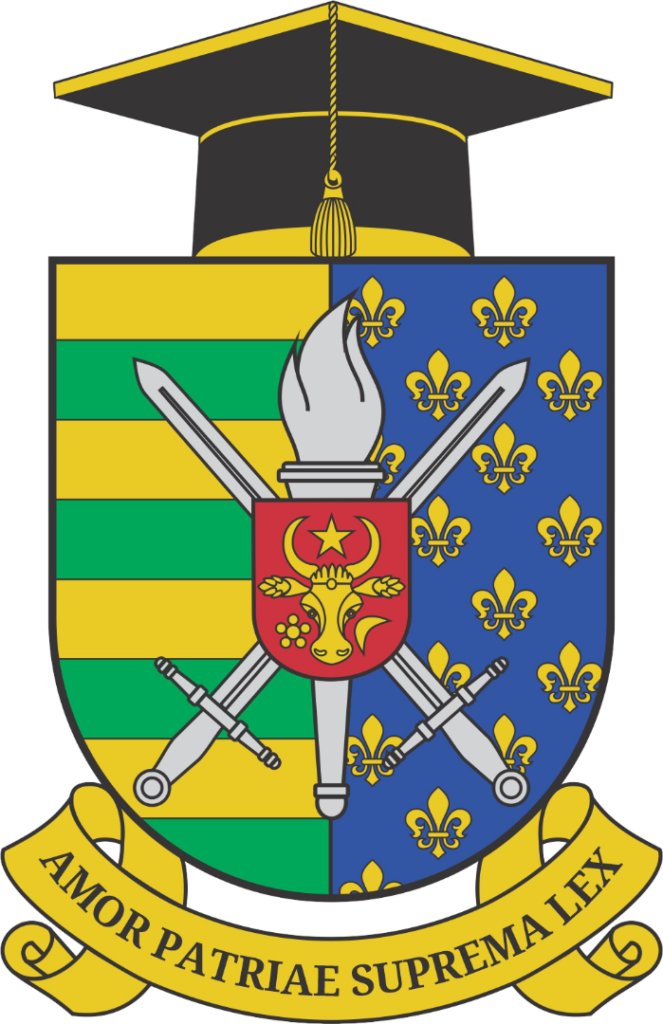
- Other name: Armed Forces Military Academy (AFMA)
- Former name: Military Lyceum of the Armed Forces of Moldova
- Type: military academy
- Established: September 1, 1993
- Founder: Ministry of Defense of Moldova
- Affiliations: Moldovan Ground Forces
- Rector: Colonel Petru Mihalcea
- Academic staff: 76
- Location: 23 Haltei Street, Chișinău, MD-2023, Moldova; 47.0119°N 28.8659°E
- Language: Romanian
- Website: amfa.army.md

The Alexandru cel Bun Military Academy (AMFA; Romanian: Academia Militară a Forțelor Armate „Alexandru cel Bun”) is the main military academy of Moldova. The mission of academy is to prepare officers for service in the Armed Forces of the Republic of Moldova in compliance with Euro-Atlantic requirements on infantry, artillery, communication, border guards and carabineers. It is named after Alexander I of Moldavia, who ruled the country as Voivode (Prince) from 1400 and 1432. Candidates for admission into the academy must pass an IQ test, as well as a physical training test.

Between 1993 and 2013, the academy trained over 1,700 servicemen.

== History ==
It was founded originally as the Military Lyceum of the Armed Forces of Moldova by order of the Moldovan government on 29 July 1992. The lyceum was the equivalent of a secondary education in Western nations and was more along the lines of Russian Suvorov Military Schools. It was reorganized into a college on 1 September 1993. On the third of the following month, the Combat Flag of Moldova and the first military oath were given to the college in a ceremony held by President Mircea Snegur. It began with a two-year pre-commissioning course of instruction and in 1996 the curriculum expanded to a three-year program. It produced graduates in June 1995 for the first time in the history of National Army, with the first promotion to the rank of Second Lieutenant occurring.

It was upgraded in 2002 to a military institute on the academy's 10th anniversary. That same year, it expanded to the current four-year program, graduating the first four-year class in 2006. This was in accordance with the education law of Moldova and the June 1999 Bologna declaration.

The school was given its current name and status of academy in 2010. In 2017, United Nations Women launched the first textbook on gender in the military in Romanian at the academy.

== Affiliations and cooperation ==
It works in cooperation with other NATO and European Union countries. It also has connections in the post-Soviet Commonwealth of Independent States. It in recent years participated in a multi-year NATO program professional military officers in Moldova. It has established relationships with institutions such as the École spéciale militaire de Saint-Cyr. In 2018, cooperation between the academy and the Nicolae Bălcescu Land Forces Academy from Romania was renewed. In recent years, representatives of the academy participated in the implementation of international military projects with China, Hungary, Russia, the United States, Ukraine, and Germany. It has also been visited by delegations and officials, from Azerbaijan, Canada, Switzerland, Greece, the United Kingdom and Turkey.

Domestically, it also cooperates with academic institutions in the country. At national level have been concluded cooperation agreements with the following institutions: the State University of Moldova, the Technical University of Moldova, the State University of Physical Education and Sports and the Ştefan cel Mare Police Academy.

In 2019, with permission from the Government of the City of Chisinau, it has had its graduation ceremony in front of the Triumphal Arch on Great National Assembly Square.

== Organization ==
The main academic insittuions of the academy are as follows:

- Faculty of Military Sciences
- Military College
- Department of Reserve Personnel Training
- Center for Studies and Quality Management
- Linguistic Center
- Library
- Sergeant Training Center

The leadership of the academy is organized between the following:

- Rector
- Bureau of Senate
- Senate

Main subdivisions are in the academy: administrative building, education building, library, mess hall, bathroom, barracks and dormitory for students.

== Rectors ==
The following have served as rectors of the academy:

- Ion Coropcean (1997-1998)
- Colonel Mihail Buclis (2010–2015)
- Colonel Sergiu Plop (2016–Present)

== Alumni ==
- Vitalie Micov, Chief of the General Staff of the Moldovan National Army
- Elena Gritco, Deputy in the 12th Legislature of the Parliament of Moldova.
- Lieutenant Alexandr Prodan, first Moldovan officer to attend officer training at Royal Air Force College Cranwell.
- Adrian Efros, Minister of Internal Affairs of Moldova from 2023-2024.
