= Ion Butmalai =

Moldovan politician

Member of the Moldovan Parliament
- In office 22 April 2009 – 9 December 2014
- Parliamentary group: Liberal Democratic Party

Personal details
- Born: 9 October 1964 Tigheci, Moldavian SSR, Soviet Union
- Died: 9 December 2014 (aged 50) Cahul, Moldova
- Party: Liberal Democratic Party

Ion Butmalai (9 October 1964 – 9 December 2014) was a Moldovan politician and a deputy in the Parliament of Moldova from 2009 to 2014, member of the Liberal Democratic Party of Moldova.

== Biography ==
Ion Butmalai was born on 9 October 1964, in Tigheci village, Leova district, Moldavian SSR, Soviet Union. In 1982–1984 he satisfied the military service within the border guards. In 1984–1985 he was a policeman driver at the Leova Police Station. Butmalai was a member of the Parliament of Moldova from 2009 until his death in 2014. Between 1985 and 1987 he studied at the Special Middle School of the Ministry of Internal Affairs of the USSR in Oryol, Russian SFSR, USSR, at the specialty – JURIST, the specialization – Administrative practice of the State Auto Police. From 1991 to 1996 he studied at the Ştefan cel Mare Police Academy as a jurist specialization – Practice and Administration in the OAI, Master – Criminal Law.

=== Death ===
On 9 December 2014, around 12:00, Ion Butmalai was found dead by his wife, shot in his chest, from his own legally-owned gun, in the garage of his home in Cahul. It is known that he would have left behind a farewell note dated 9 December 2014 at 8:50, in which he blames in his death Vlad Filat (president of the LDPM) Vlad Plahotniuc (the first vice-president of the DPM), Valeriu Streleț (the first vice-president of the LDPM), Liliana Palihovici (vice-president of the LDPM), Vadim Pistrinciuc (vice-president of the LDPM), Victor Rosca (general secretary of the LDPM ). He was 50. He was buried with military honors on 11 December.

Ion Butmalai was married and had two sons for 24 and 16 years.
