= Ion Creangă State Pedagogical University of Chișinău =

University in Chișinău, Moldova

Coordinates: 47°02′10″N 28°48′43″E

- Universitatea Pedagogică de Stat „Ion Creangă” din Chișinău
- Former names: Moldovan State Pedagogical Institute (1940–1955); Ion Creangă State Pedagogical Institute (1955–1992)
- Motto: Disce ut doceas (Latin)
- Motto in English: Learn in order to teach
- Type: Public
- Established: 1940; 86 years ago
- Rector: Alexandra Barbăneagră
- Students: 6,000
- Location: 1 Ion Creangă Street, Chișinău, MD-2069, Moldova
- Campus: Urban
- Website: upsc.md

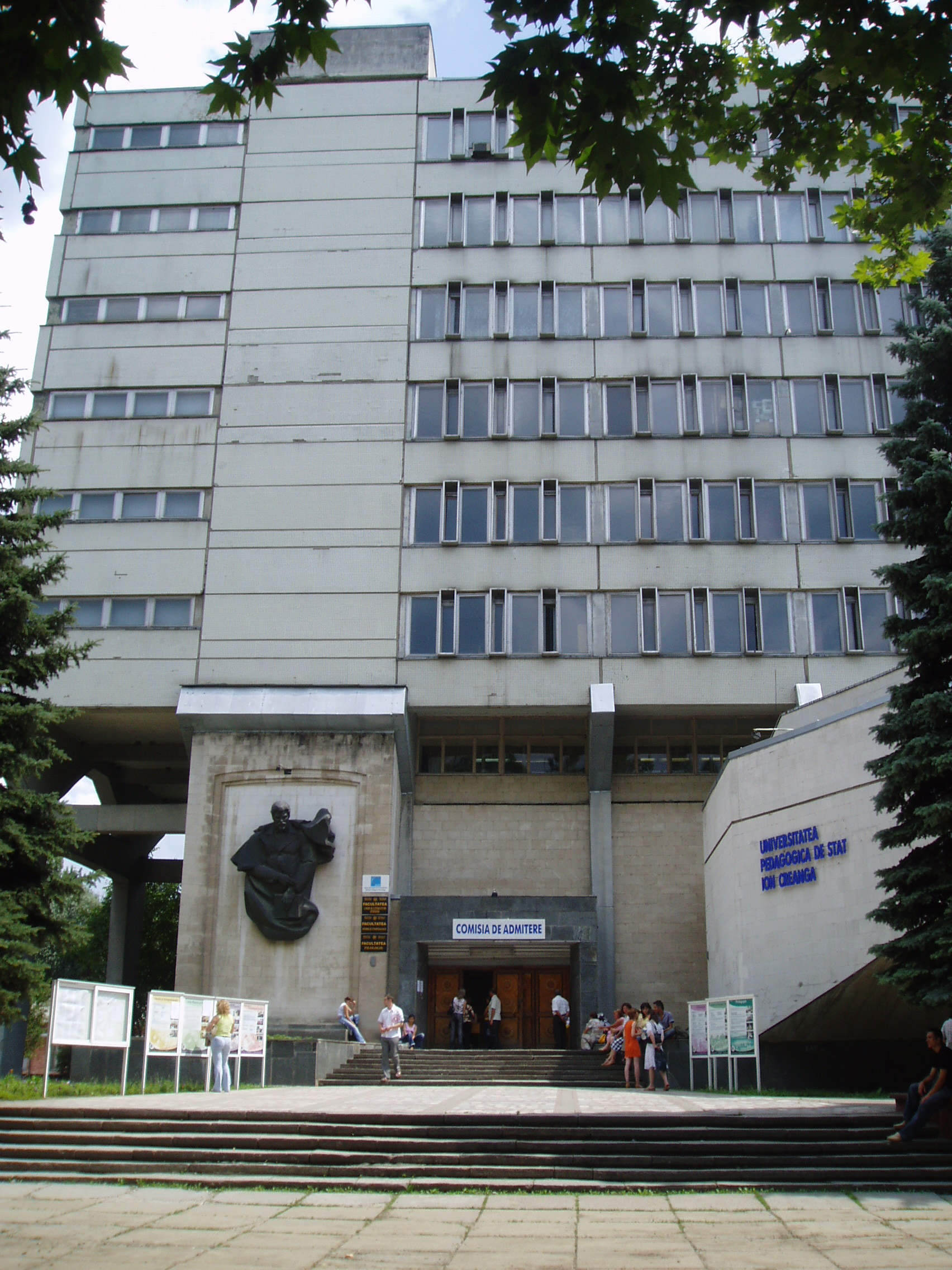

The Ion Creangă State Pedagogical University of Chișinău (UPSC; Romanian: Universitatea Pedagogică de Stat „Ion Creangă" din Chișinău) is a higher educational institution in Chișinău, Moldova. It was formed in August 1940 as the Moldovan State Pedagogical Institute (Romanian: Institutul Pedagogic Moldovenesc de Stat, Russian: Кишинёвский педагогический институт, romanized: Kishinovskiy pedagogicheskiy institut, lit. 'Kishinev Pedagogical Institute'), being renamed the Ion Creangă State Pedagogical Institute in 1955, and receiving its current name on 21 May 1992. It is named after the Romanian writer and story-teller Ion Creangă. The university offers Bachelor, Master and Doctorate level degrees.

== Organization ==
Currently, there are over 6000 students in attendance in nine faculties at the university. The faculties are:

=== Faculty of Computer Science and Information Technologies ===
This is the newest faculty at the university, specializing in computer sciences.

=== Faculty of Foreign Languages ===
Founded on 1 September 1948, the Faculty of Foreign Languages and Literatures was the first foreign language faculty in Moldova. The college offers language and literature courses in English, French, German, Italian and Spanish.

=== Faculty of Psychology and Special Education ===
The Faculty of Psychology and Special Education was formed in 1992 by merging the Faculty of Defectologie and the Department of General Psychology.

=== Faculty of Philosophy ===
Founded in 1940, the Faculty of Philosophy is one of the original faculties at Ion Creangă.

=== Faculty of History and Ethnopedagogy ===
The Faculty of History and Ethnopedagogy Is a history and social sciences with specialties in history, geography, civic education and moral-spiritual education. It is one of the original faculties of the university.

=== Faculty of Pedagogy ===
The Faculty of Pedagogy was founded in 1957. The faculty focuses on educational training to prepare teachers for all pre-graduate levels of education.

=== Faculty of Arts and Design ===
The Faculty Arts and Design originated in 1979 when members of the Physics and Mathematics faculty formed the Department of Painting and Graphics. This department was reformed in 1982-1983 as the Faculty of Arts and Design.

=== Faculty of Continuing Education and Management ===
Founded in 1975, the Faculty of Continuing Education and Management aims at continual training for teachers in leadership positions and for teacher-trainers.

=== Faculty of Social Professions ===
The Faculty of Social Professions is a faculty that organizes and provides extracurricular activities for students for credit. These activities reflect both the cultural and education traditions on Moldova and of Ion Creanga, and include dance, music, sports and other social activities.

The University has six buildings for study and classroom use, seven homes student residences, a library with six reading rooms, a computer connected to the Internet, and a printing house. The University was accredited by Government of the Republic of Moldova no. 559 of 7 May 2002, no. certificate of accreditation. 009.

== See also ==
- List of universities in Moldova
- Education in Moldova
