= Nicolae Filip =

Moldovan physicist

Nicolae Filip OR
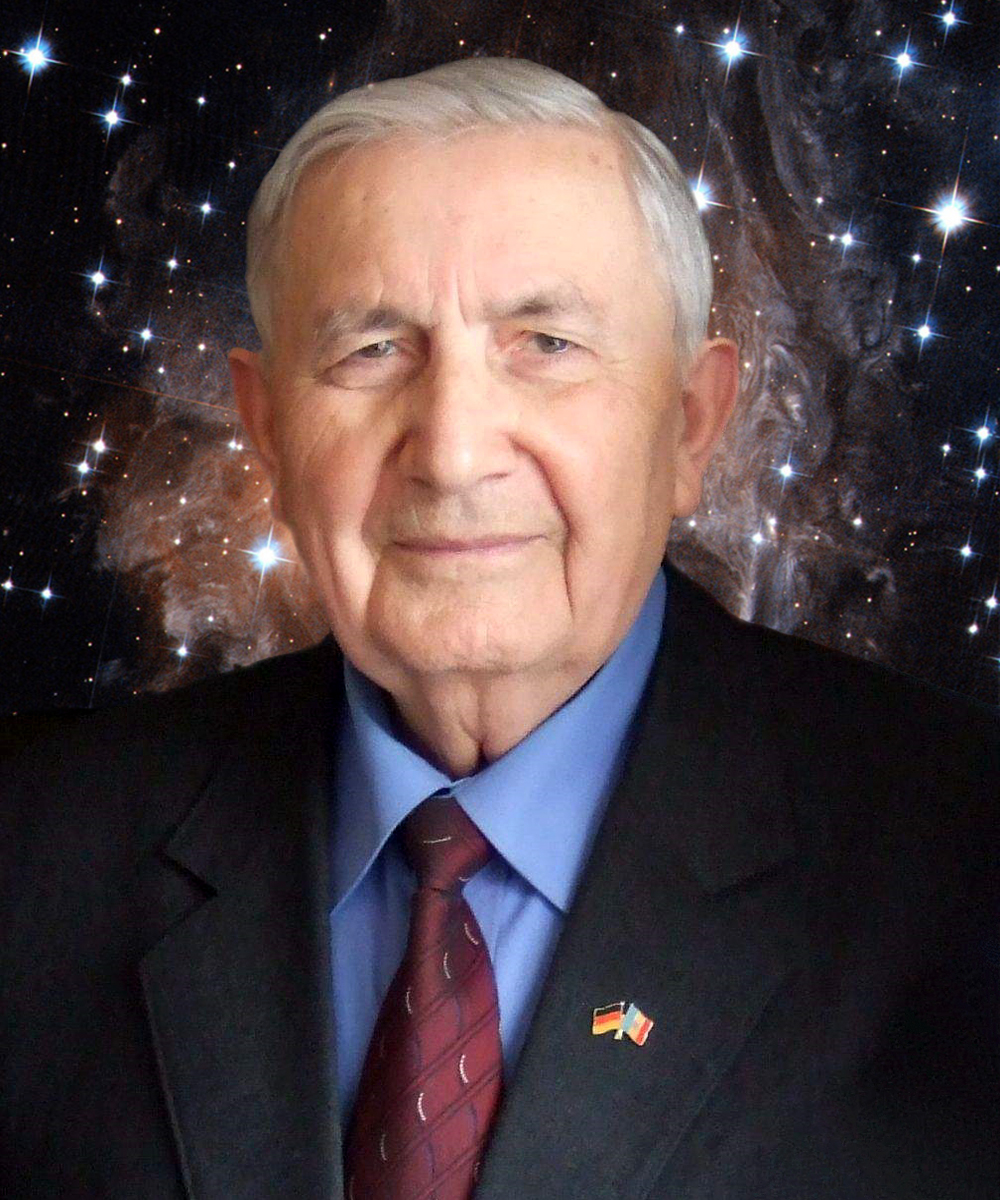
- Filip in 2008
- Born: March 3, 1926; Sofia, Kingdom of Romania
- Died: May 15, 2009 (aged 83); Bălți, Moldova
- Occupation: Physicist

Nicolae Filip (3 March 1926 – 15 May 2009) was a Moldovan physicist born in the village of Sofia, Bălți County to a family of farmers. He contributed significantly to the study of "The spread of ultrashort radio waves" and was elected as an honorary member of the Academy of Sciences of Moldova.

He was the Chancellor of Bălți's State University "Alecu Russo".

== Biography ==
Nicolae Filip was born on 3 March 1926, in Sofia Village of Bălți County, in a family of peasants. He completed the primary 7 years school at his native village, and then, the middle school No. 1 in the Bălți town.

In 1948, he became a student of the Faculty of Physics and Mathematics of the State University, Chișinău. After the third year of education, he was transferred to the Pedagogical Institute of Chișinău and in 1952graduated it with the honorable mention, obtaining the diploma of physicist. In the same year, he became a lecturer at the Soroca Institute of Education.

Since 1953, he has been working at the Pedagogical Institute in Bălți and, after its reorganization into the "A. Russo” State University, he occupied the positions of lecturer, senior lecturer, professor, associate professor, head of the department, deputy-rector for science, rector.

== Career ==
- Doctor of Physical and Mathematical Sciences (1962).
- Habilitirovanny Doctor of Physical and Mathematical Sciences (1979).
- University Professor (1980), a leading specialist in the field of radio physics.
- Excellence in Public Education of the USSR (1971).
- 1973 awarded the title "Honored Worker of Higher School of MSSR.
- 1995 was elected an honorary member of the Academy of Sciences of Moldova.
- 1996 awarded the State Prize of the Republic of Moldova in the field of science and technology.
- Since 1997, ND Philippe member of the International Academy of Sciences Graduate School.
- 2000 Honorary Doctor Jassy Technical University. Gh.Asachi.
- Since 2001, is an honorary citizen of the city Belts.

== Awards ==
- Order "Order of Work Merit", 1995
- Order "Order of the Republic", 2001

Bălți Municipal Council Decision Nr. 11/24 on 03.04.2001, the recorded in the Book of Honor by assigning him the title "Honorary Citizen mun. Bălți."
