= Tatiana Potîng =

Moldovan politician (born 1971)

Deputy Prime Minister of Moldova for Social Affairs
- In office 30 May 2013 – 18 February 2015
- President: Nicolae Timofti
- Prime Minister: Iurie Leancă
- Preceded by: Mihai Moldovanu
- Succeeded by: Gheorghe Brega

Deputy Minister of Education
- In office 20 November 2009 – 30 May 2013
- President: Mihai Ghimpu (acting); Vladimir Filat (acting); Marian Lupu (acting); Nicolae Timofti
- Prime Minister: Vladimir Filat
- Minister: Leonid Bujor; Mihail Șleahtițchi; Maia Sandu

Personal details
- Born: 4 February 1971 (age 55) Hîjdieni, Moldavian SSR, Soviet Union
- Education: Alecu Russo State University of Bălți

Tatiana Potîng (born 4 February 1971) is a Moldovan politician who served as deputy prime minister between 31 May 2013 and 18 February 2015.

== Early life and education ==
Potîng was born in a village Hîjdieni, Glodeni District, on 4 February 1971. In 1993 she received a bachelor's degree in philology from Alecu Russo State University of Bălți. In 2007 she graduated from Institute of Philology of the Academy of Sciences and obtained a PhD.

== Career ==
Potîng started her career as a teacher in 1993. Then she worked at Alecu Russo State University of Bălți from 1998 to 2009. She was appointed vice minister of education in 2009. On 31 May 2013 she was named as the deputy prime minister for social affairs in the cabinet led by Prime Minister Iurie Leancă. Her term ended on 18 February 2015. She is part of Liberal Reformer Party.
