= Ștefan cel Mare Academy of the Ministry of Internal Affairs =

Police academy of Moldova

- Academia „Ștefan cel Mare” a Ministerului Afacerilor Interne
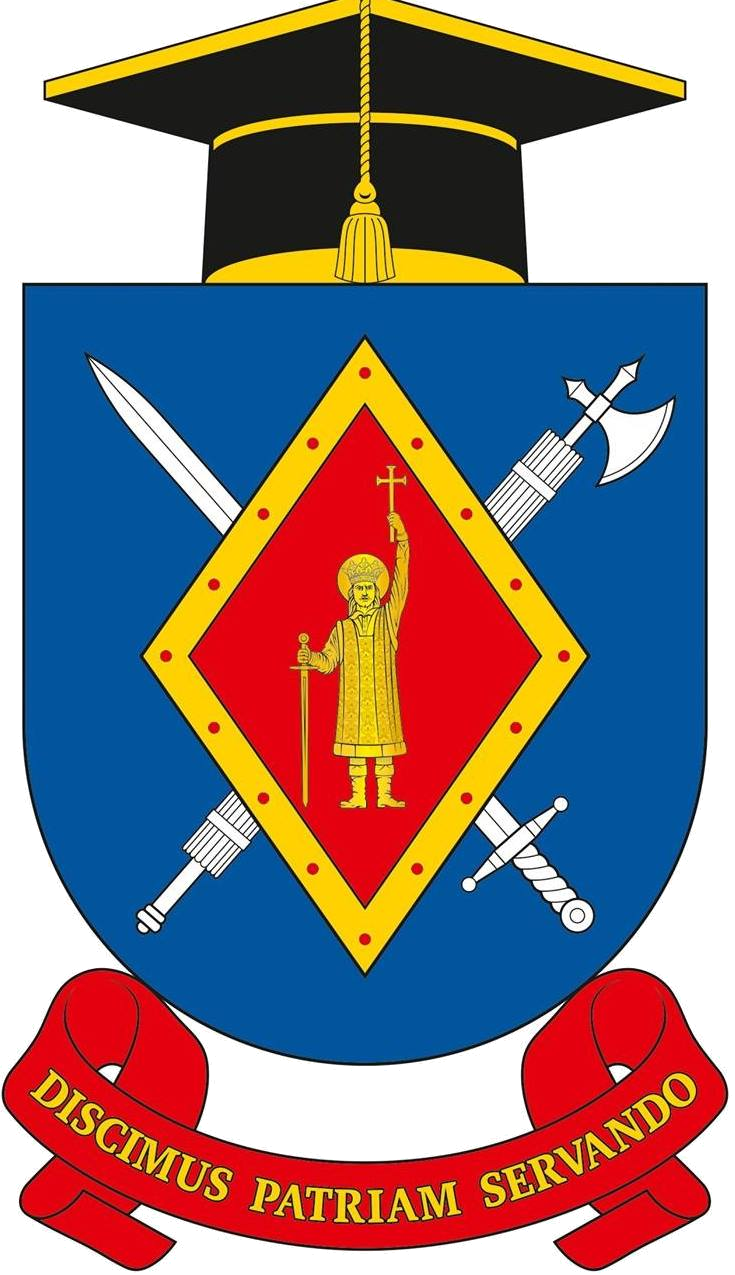
- Motto: Discimus Patriam servando (Latin)
- Motto in English: We learn by saving our country
- Type: Police academy
- Established: 1 September 1990
- Rector: Dinu Ostavciuc
- Location: 21 Gheorghe Asachi Street, Chișinău, MD-2009, Moldova
- Website: academy.police.md

The Ştefan cel Mare Academy of the Ministry of Internal Affairs (Romanian: Academia „Ștefan cel Mare" a Ministerului Afacerilor Interne) is the police academy of Moldova. It is named after Stephen III of Moldavia, who ruled the country as Voivode (Prince) from 1457 and 1504. It primarily trains personnel of the General Police Inspectorate in their future service as law enforcement officers. Outside of the IGP, it also trains personnel from other law enforcement agencies under the Ministry of Internal Affairs. It is located on 21 Gheorghe Asachi Street in Chișinău.

== Overview ==
The academy was established on 17 August 1990 by resolution no. 276 of the Government of Moldova. It was officially formed on 1 September. During its existence, the institution has trained over 20,000 specialists in law, public order and safety. Study programs include practical training at three levels of the Bologna Process (bachelor's, master's, doctoral). It is part of the Association of European Police Colleges. It is a recipient of the Order of Ștefan cel Mare. It concluded 36 collaboration agreements and contracts with several educational institutions in Azerbaijan, Georgia, Russia, Germany, Latvia, Belarus, Ukraine, Turkey and Romania.

=== Administration ===
The academy leadership is organized into the following:

- Rector (currently Dinu Ostavciuc)
- Vice-Rector for studies and quality management
- Vice-Rector for Personnel and Education
- Vice Rector for Science
- Head of the Professional Development Department
- Head of the Operational Management Department

Currently, the Police Academy brings together two faculties:

- Faculty of Law
- Faculty of Civil Security and Public Order

Both faculties are governed by its own bodies: the Faculty Council, the Office of the Faculty Council, the Dean, the Vice-Deans and its Methodist lecturers. The supreme governing body is the Faculty Council which is elected for a term of five years.

=== Museum ===
The inauguration of the Museum of the Police Academy (Romanian: Muzeului Academiei de Poliție) was held on the occasion of the 10th anniversary of the academy on 1 September 2000. The Museum of the Academy is a cultural and educational institution through which national and cultural values are propagated and related to the activity of the IGP. The museum collaborates with various state and public institutions and organizations.

=== Honor Guard ===
The Honor Guard of the Ministry of Internal Affairs consists of students of the academy, and serves ceremonial duties in the MAI. Its activities are aimed at promoting the image of state law institutions in society. It is notable for its use of Ștefan cel Mare era uniforms in its exhibition drill routines.

== Notable alumni ==
- Alexandru Pînzari, Minister of Defense of Moldova in 2020
- Pavel Voicu – Minister of Defence of Moldova in the Sandu Cabinet and the Interior Minister under Prime Minister Ion Chicu
- Alexandru Jizdan, Minister of Internal Affairs of Moldova from 2016 to 2019 in the Filip Cabinet
- Ion Butmalai, Deputy in Parliament of Moldova from 2009 to 2014
- Vasile Bîtca, Minister of Agriculture, Regional Development and Environment from mid-late 2017

== See also ==
- Alexandru cel Bun Military Academy
- Education in Moldova
- List of universities in Moldova
- National Academy of Internal Affairs
