= Daniella Misail-Nichitin =

Moldovan politician

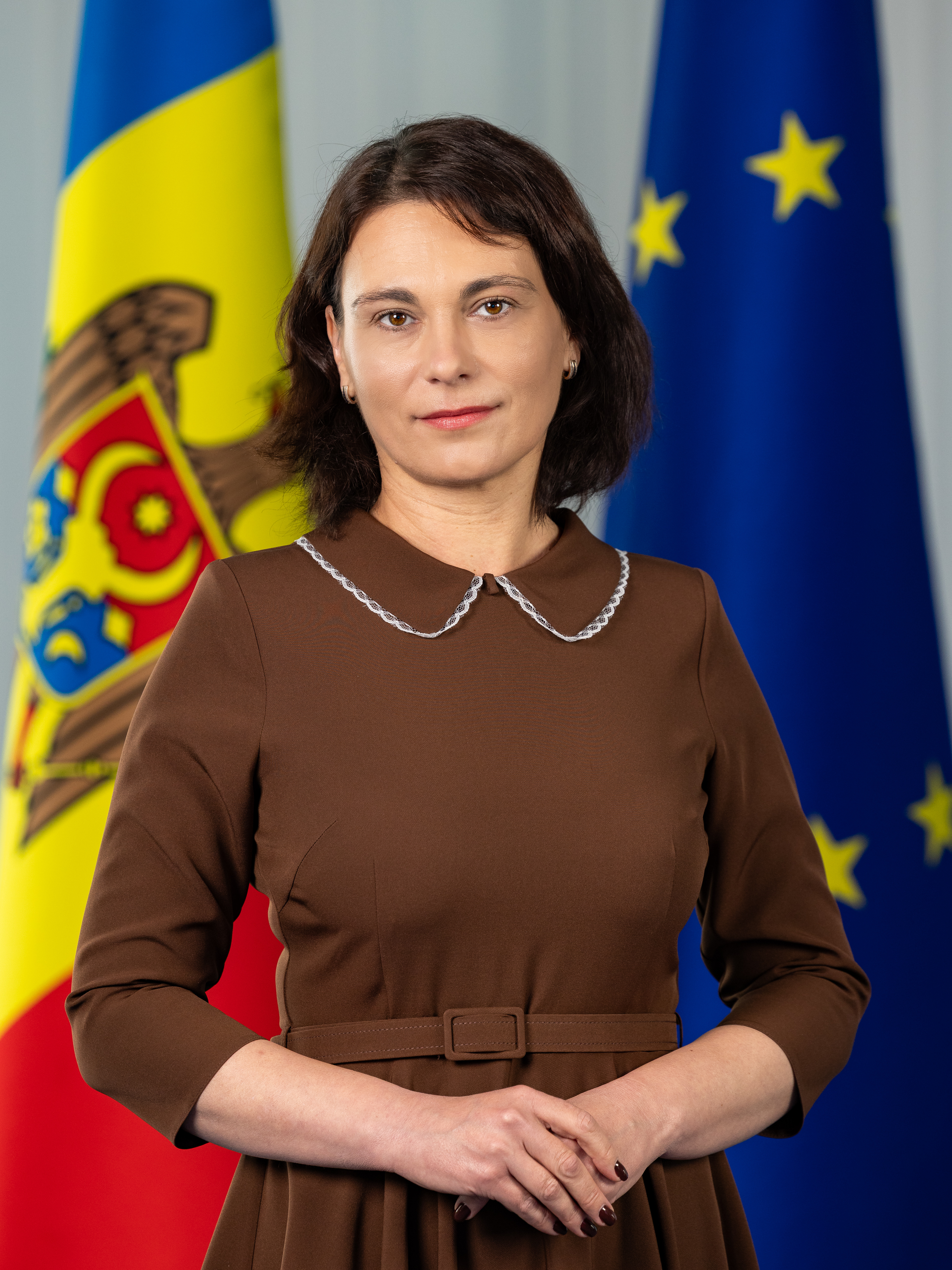
- Official portrait, 2025

Minister of Internal Affairs
- Incumbent
- Assumed office 19 November 2024
- President: Maia Sandu
- Prime Minister: Dorin Recean; Alexandru Munteanu; Eugen Osmochescu (acting); Vasile Tofan
- Preceded by: Adrian Efros

Secretary of State of the Ministry of Internal Affairs
- In office 12 January 2022 – 19 November 2024
- President: Maia Sandu
- Prime Minister: Natalia Gavrilița; Dorin Recean
- Minister: Ana Revenco; Adrian Efros

Personal details
- Born: 25 September 1976 (age 49) Chișinău, Moldavian SSR, Soviet Union
- Education: Nicolae Testemițanu State University of Medicine and Pharmacy; Academy of Economic Studies of Moldova

Daniella Misail-Nichitin (born 25 September 1976) is a Moldovan jurist and security expert currently serving as Minister of Internal Affairs of Moldova in the Tofan Cabinet.
