= Alexandru cel Bun Military College =

Coordinates: 47.0121°N 28.8659°E

The Alexandru cel Bun Military College (Romanian: Colegiul Militar „Alexandru cel Bun”) is a military vocational school located in Chișinău, Moldova. It operates under the jurisdiction of the Ministry of Defense of Moldova and is integrated directly within the infrastructure of the Alexandru cel Bun Military Academy. The college is designed to address critical staffing shortages within the Armed Forces of the Republic of Moldova.

== History ==
The legislative framework for the college was signed into effect by the Government of Moldova on May 29, 2024, and the inaugural admissions cycle launched on July 15. The first day of its first academic year was on September 1.

== Academics and Student Life ==
The program is open to both male and female applicants who have successfully completed lower secondary education (gymnasium or the 9th grade). The military specialties taught at the college include:

- Infantry
- Artillery

The institution has a state-mandated quota of 60 slots per academic year. Enrolled students receive a complete sponsorship, which includes coverage for tuition, on-campus accommodation, uniforms, tactical gear, and a monthly student stipend.

== Benefits ==
Alumni are granting the primary NCO rank of Corporal of the Moldovan National Army and are able to obtain a technician qualification in one of the following specialties:

- Infantry
- Artillery
- Military Communications and Information Technologies

In this regard, they are guaranteed jobs in one of the military units of the National Army. They also have the option to continue their studies at the Alexandru cel Bun Military Academy, without an admission competition. Other benefits include free training for obtaining a driving license, the ability to be certified in foreign languages.
