= University of Galați =

Public university in Romania

"Dunarea de Jos" University of Galati
- Universitatea „Dunărea de Jos” din Galați
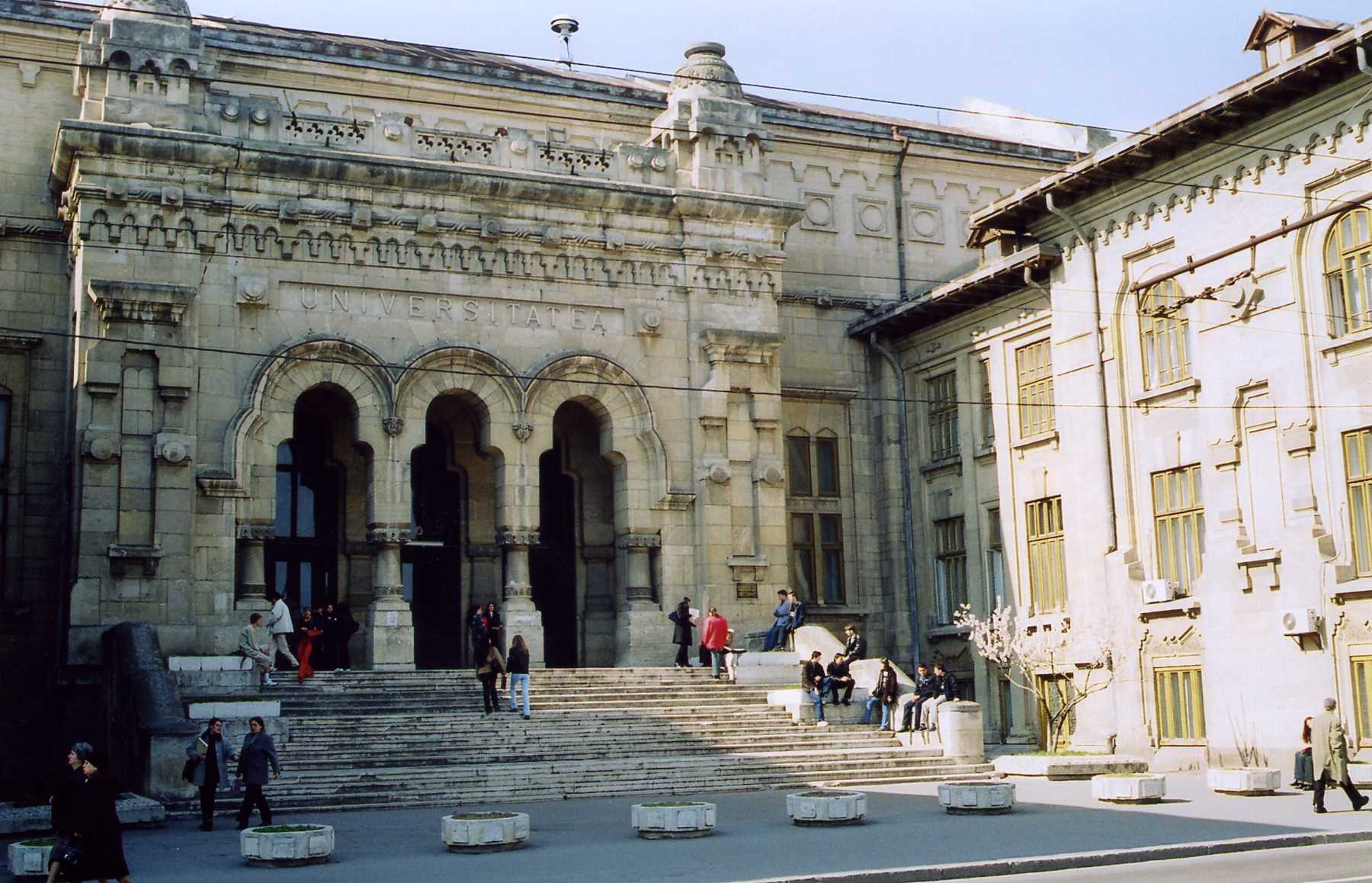
- The Rectorat Building
- Motto: Your Career, Our Priority!
- Type: Public
- Established: 1974
- Rector: Laura Daniela Buruiană
- Academic staff: 700
- Administrative staff: 1,275
- Students: 11,752 (2015–16)
- Undergraduates: 9,261
- Postgraduates: 2,285
- Doctoral students: 206
- Location: Galați, Romania; 45°26′19″N 28°03′21″E
- Website: www.ugal.ro

University rankings

Regional – Overall
- QS Emerging Europe and Central Asia: 182 (2022)

"Dunarea de Jos" University of Galati (Romanian Universitatea „Dunărea de Jos” din Galați) is a public university located in Galați, Romania. It was founded in 1974.

== History ==
The University of Galați, initially known as the Polytechnic Institute, was established in July 1974 through the merger of the Polytechnic Institute and the Pedagogical Institute. The Polytechnic Institute of Galați had its roots in the Land Improvement Institute, founded in 1948, and the Naval and Mechanical Engineering Institute, established in 1951. In 1953, the Institute of Fish Breeding and Fishing Technology, located in Constanța, was transferred to Galați and merged with the Naval and Agronomic Institutes, forming the Technical Institute of Galați. In 1955, the Institute for Food Industry of Bucharest was also relocated to Galați. Two years later, these various higher education institutions were consolidated into the Polytechnic Institute of Galați..

The Pedagogical Institute of Galați was founded in 1959 and consisted of five faculties: Languages, Mathematics, Physics-Chemistry, Natural Sciences, and Sports. The two higher education institutions, the Polytechnic Institute and the Pedagogical Institute, merged in 1974 and formed the University of Galați. In 1991, the university was renamed "Dunărea de Jos" ("Lower Danube") University, after the historical name of the area around the city of Galați.

== Organization ==
The University of Galați consists of twelve faculties and two colleges with more than thirty departments. It has several unique fields of education in the country, such as: Naval Engineering and Fishery. During the years, specialists covering a wide range of education fields have been trained at the University of Galați:

- Engineers
- Teachers
- Economists
- Programmers and Computer System Designers.

New university programmes have been developed in the last years: Management in Industry, Finances and Credit, International Economics Relations, Administration and Technical Informatics. Post-graduation courses for engineers and training courses for the teachers of the pre-university level are organised every year.

The University of Galați organises programs for the doctoral degree and master's degree in the technical fields of chemistry, physics, mathematics, economy, food technology and fishing, automatic control and computation techniques, artificial intelligence. The University of Galați is also providing programs for the doctoral degree in the field of social and humanistic sciences.

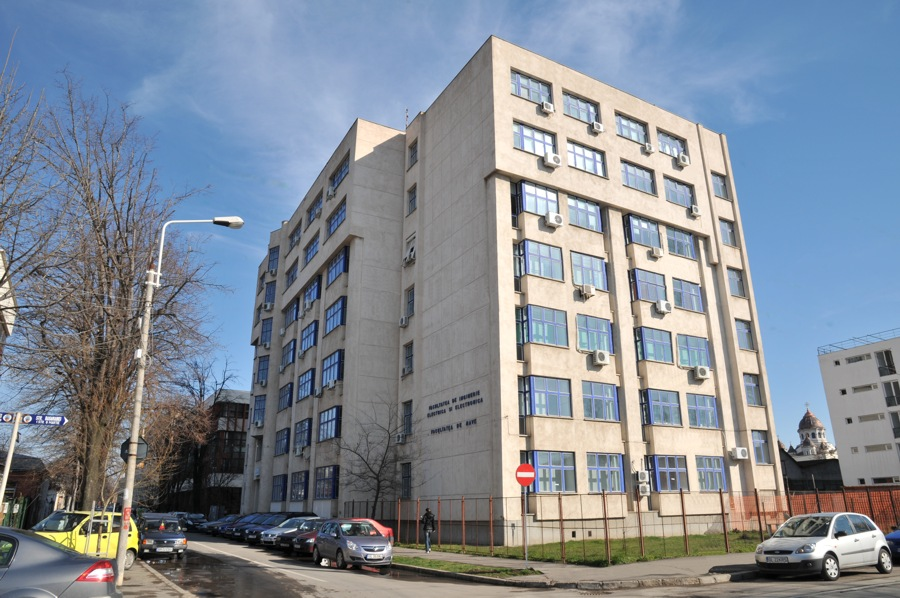
The Y Building- Faculties of Computer Science, Electrical Engineering, Naval Architecture

The university has 14 faculties, one cross–border faculty, and one department:

- Faculty of Engineering
- Faculty of Computer Science
- Faculty of Automation, Computer Sciences, Electronics and Electrical Engineering
- Faculty of Naval Architecture
- Faculty of Food Science and Engineering
- Faculty of Engineering and Agronomy in Brăila
- Faculty of Sciences and Environment
- Faculty of Letters
- Faculty of Physical Education and Sport
- Faculty of Economic and Business Administration
- Faculty of Social, Political and Legal Sciences
- Faculty of Medicine and Pharmacy
- Faculty of History, Philosophy and Theology
- Faculty of Arts
- Cross–border Faculty of Humanities, Economic and Engineering Sciences, in collaboration with State University of Cahul - Republic of Moldova
- Department of Teacher Training

== See also ==
- List of universities in Romania
