= List of universities in Moldova =

This is a list of universities in Moldova.

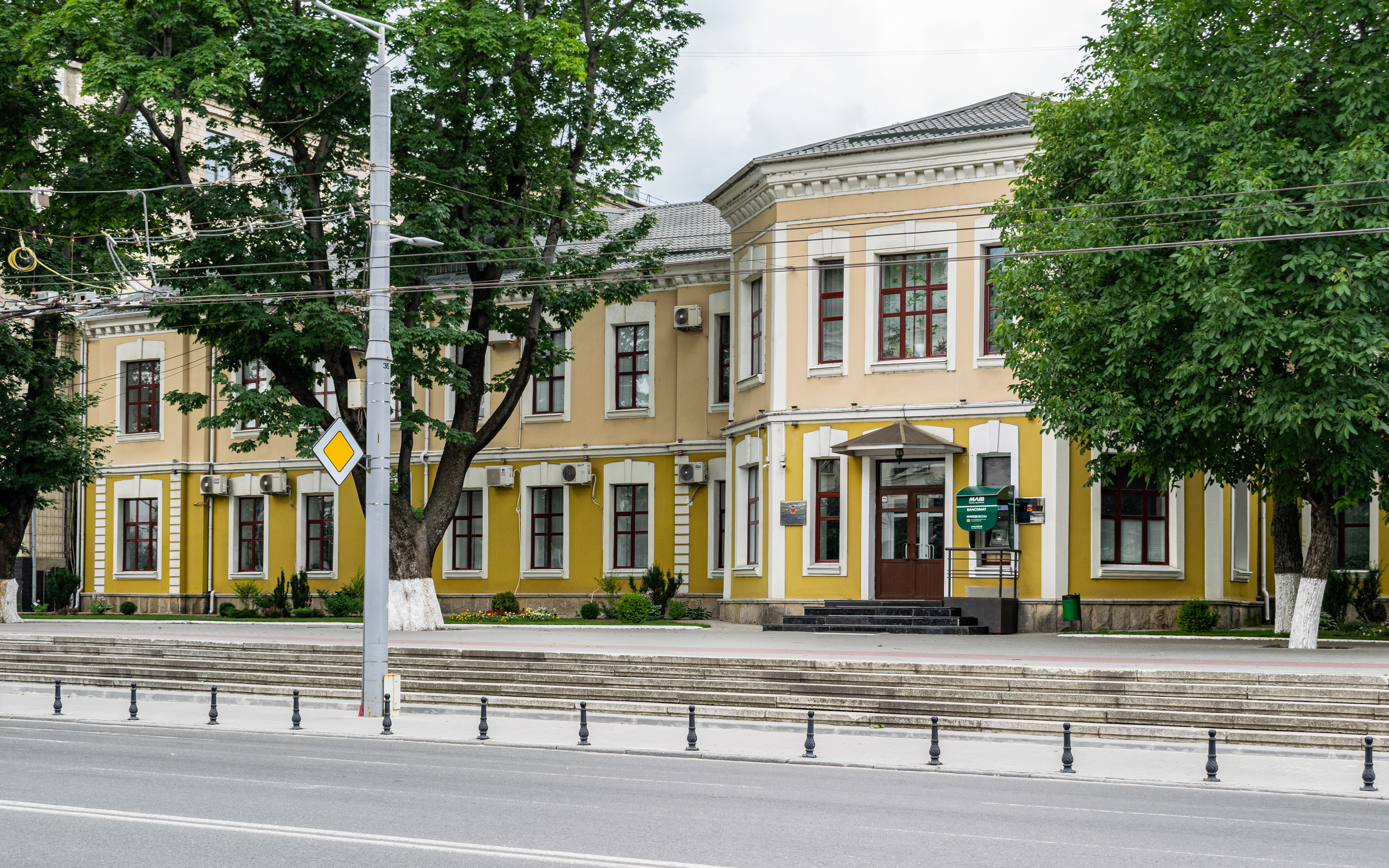
Nicolae Testemițanu State University of Medicine and Pharmacy

== Public institutions ==
Institution	Location	Established
Ion Creangă State Pedagogical University	Chișinău	1940
Academy of Music, Theatre and Fine Arts	Chișinău	1940
Alecu Russo State University	Bălți	1945
Nicolae Testemițanu State University of Medicine and Pharmacy	Chișinău	1945
Moldova State University	Chișinău	1946
Technical University of Moldova	Chișinău	1964
Ștefan cel Mare Academy of the Ministry of Internal Affairs	Chișinău	1990
Academy of Economic Studies of Moldova	Chișinău	1991
Comrat State University	Comrat	1991
Alexandru cel Bun Military Academy	Chișinău	1993
Angel Kanchev University of Ruse, Taraclia Branch	Taraclia	2025

== Private institutions ==
Institution	Location
Cooperative-Commercial University of Moldova	Chișinău
Free International University of Moldova	Chișinău
University of European Studies of Moldova	Chișinău
Constantin Stere University of Political and European Studies	Chișinău

== See also ==
- Education in Moldova
