= Adrian Efros =

Moldovan politician (born 1982)

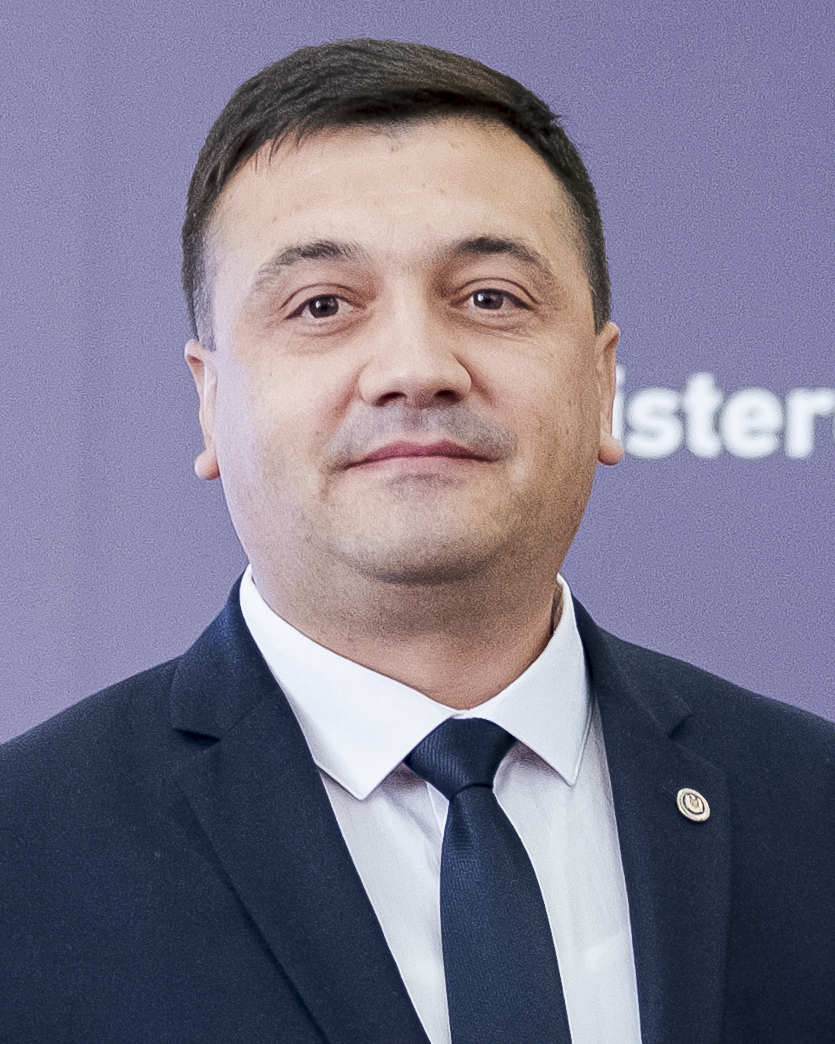
- Efros in 2023

Minister of Internal Affairs
- In office 17 July 2023 – 19 November 2024
- President: Maia Sandu
- Prime Minister: Dorin Recean
- Preceded by: Ana Revenco
- Succeeded by: Daniella Misail-Nichitin

Personal details
- Born: 7 October 1982 (age 43) Drăsliceni, Moldavian SSR, Soviet Union
- Education: Perspectiva-Int University; Alexandru cel Bun Military Academy; Naval War College

Military service
- Allegiance: Moldova
- Branch/service: Moldovan National Army
- Rank: Colonel

Adrian Efros (born 7 October 1982) is a Moldovan military officer and politician who served as Minister of Internal Affairs of Moldova.

== Early life and education ==
He was born on 7 October 1982 in Drăsliceni, Criuleni District. He is a graduate of the Alexandru cel Bun Military Academy and the United States Naval War College.

== Military career ==
He served as a commander for engineering units, deploying to the NATO-led Kosovo Force. Efros served as the Head of the Logistics Directorate of the General Staff of the Moldovan National Army, serving with the rank of Colonel. Following the start of the Russo-Ukrainian war, Efros was made head of the newly established Single Crisis Management Center, coordinating the logistical response to the influx of Ukrainian refugees entering Moldova.

== Ministry of Internal Affairs ==
On 17 July 2023, he was appointed as Minister of Internal Affairs in the Dorin Recean government. He resigned and was replaced on 19 November 2024 by Daniella Misail-Nichitin.
