= Irina Lozovan =

Moldovan politician

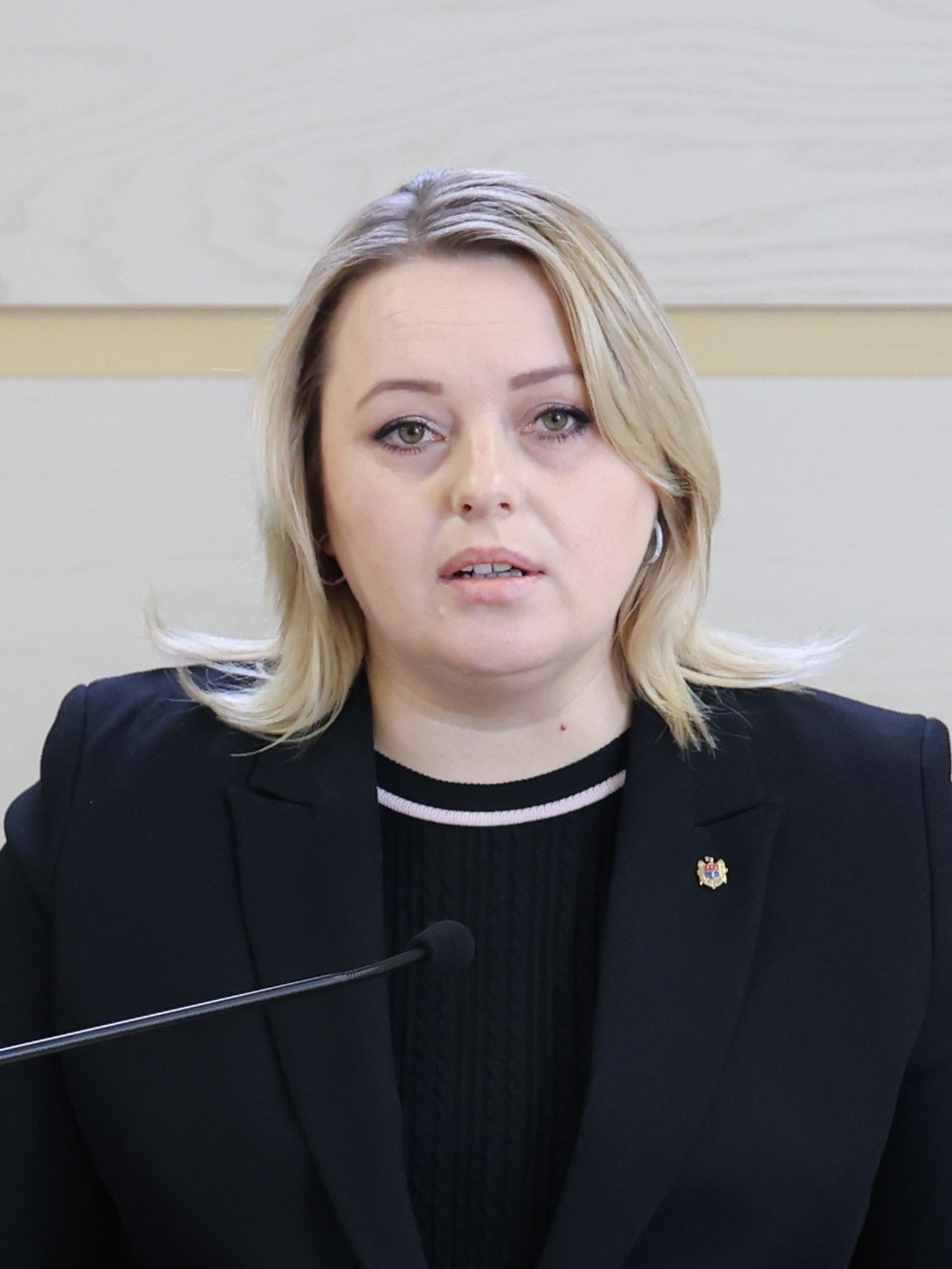
- Lozovan in 2024

Member of the Moldovan Parliament
- In office 9 March 2019 – 16 October 2025
- Parliamentary group: Party of Socialists; Bloc of Communists and Socialists; Revival Party

Personal details
- Born: Irina Mihail Lozovan; 27 December 1983 (age 42) Lipcani, Moldavian SSR, Soviet Union (now Moldova)
- Party: Revival Party
- Other political affiliations: Party of Socialists of the Republic of Moldova
- Education: Alecu Russo State University of Bălți
- Occupation: Politician

Irina Lozovan (born 27 December 1983) is a Moldovan politician. She was a member of the Parliament of Moldova from 2019 to 2025. Originally a member of the Party of Socialists of the Republic of Moldova (PSRM), she joined the Revival Party, affiliated to Moldovan fugitive oligarch Ilan Shor, in 2023.

On 31 March 2025, Lozovan was sentenced to six years in prison for knowingly accepting funding for a political party from Shor's criminal group. She and her husband, sentenced at the same time as her to five years for complicity, escaped to Moldova's Russian-backed unrecognized breakaway region of Transnistria to avoid justice. She was later sanctioned by the European Union (EU) on 15 July, the Moldovan authorities on 25 July, Switzerland on 12 August and Canada on 28 August.

== Biography ==
=== Early life and education ===
Irina Mihail Lozovan was born on 27 December 1983 in the town of Lipcani, in the Moldavian SSR of the Soviet Union (now Moldova). She studied at the Gheorghe Asachi Pedagogical College (now the Gheorghe Asachi College) of Lipcani from 1999 to 2001 and at the Alecu Russo State University of Bălți from 2001 to 2007.

=== Political career ===
Lozovan joined the Party of Socialists of the Republic of Moldova (PSRM) in 2014. She was councillor of Ocnița District and of the town of Otaci, and became a member of the Parliament of Moldova for the PSRM in 2019. She had run for the Ocnița constituency in the 2019 Moldovan parliamentary election and won, beating the five other candidates. Lozovan became member of the parliament for the Bloc of Communists and Socialists (BECS) in 2021. According to a June 2021 investigation by the Center for Investigative Journalism of Moldova (CIJM), Lozovan was involved in a corruption case involving the state-owned company Edineț Forestry Enterprise.

On 25 March 2023, Lozovan announced that she would leave the BECS and join the Movement for the People. On 16 May, parliament member Alexandr Nesterovschi announced that he and Lozovan would join the Revival Party, led by Serghei Mișin. On 22 May, Lozovan, Nesterovschi, Vasile Bolea and Alexandr Suhodolski, all former BECS parliament members, joined the Revival Party.

On 4 August of that year, the National Anticorruption Center (CNA) announced that Lozovan's husband, Ocnița District councillor Pavel Gîrleanu, had been put under preventive arrest for 30 days, as he would have attempted to bribe Ocnița mayor Victor Artamanciuc with 30,000 dollars to leave the PSRM and join the Revival Party. On 21 September, Lozovan and Nesterovschi were stripped of their parliamentary immunity and arrested for 72 hours. Both were accused of accepting illegal financing from the criminal group of Moldovan fugitive oligarch Ilan Shor, to whom the Revival Party was affiliated, as well as of money laundering and passive corruption.

=== Conviction, escape to Transnistria and sanctions ===
On 31 March 2025, Lozovan and Gîrleanu were sentenced in absentia to six and five years in prison respectively and banned from holding public office for five years. Lozoveanu was sentenced for knowingly accepting funding for a political party from Shor's organized criminal group, while Gîrleanu was recognized as accomplice. The court ruled that 30,000 dollars, recognized as corpus delicti, with which both tried to bribe Ocnița's mayor, would be confiscated and transferred to the state.

On 3 April, the head of the Moldovan Police, Viorel Cernăuțeanu, declared that Lozovan and Gîrleanu had escaped to Moldova's Russian-backed unrecognized breakaway region of Transnistria to avoid justice. Nesterovschi had also been sentenced on 19 March, to 12 years in prison, and likewise escaped to Transnistria the day before. However, unlike Nesterovschi, who escaped with the help of the Russian embassy in Chișinău, Lozovan and Gîrleanu escaped through other means, and also before him, according to Cernăuțeanu.

On 15 July, Lozovan and Nesterovschi, among others, were included on the European Union (EU)'s list of sanctioned Moldovan politicians and entities close to Shor. The EU deemed the sanctioned individuals and entities responsible for actions aimed at destabilizing or threatening Moldova's sovereignty and independence. As a result of the sanctions, Lozovan and the others would no longer be able to travel to the EU, and their assets in member states would be blocked. On 25 July, Moldova's Interinstitutional Supervisory Council, headed by Prime Minister Dorin Recean, included most of these individuals and entities, including Lozovan and Nesterovschi, on the Moldovan authorities' sanctions list, as they "help Shor bring disorder and destabilization to our country" as Recean stated, which would result in their bank accounts being blocked.

Switzerland joined the EU's 15 July sanctions against Lozovan, Nesterovschi and the others on 12 August. On 28 August, Canada imposed sanctions against Lozovan, Nesterovschi, 14 other individuals and two entities in Moldova, as they would be involved in actions of Russian interference before the 2025 Moldovan parliamentary election. As a result, these individuals and entities would be unable to enter Canada, their assets in the country would be blocked and any financial transactions with them would be prohibited.
