= Technical University of Moldova =

University in Chișinău, Moldova

Coordinates: 47.0307°N 28.8239°E

- Universitatea Tehnică a Moldovei
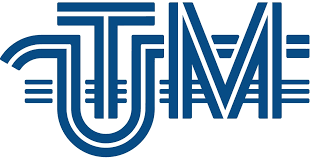
- Former name: Polytechnic Institute of Chișinău
- Type: Public
- Established: 1964; 62 years ago
- Rector: Viorel Bostan
- Faculty: 733
- Students: 9,520
- Location: 168 Stephen the Great Boulevard, Chișinău, MD-2004, Moldova
- Website: utm.md

University rankings

Regional – Overall
- QS Emerging Europe and Central Asia: 301-350 (2022)

The Technical University of Moldova (UTM; Romanian: Universitatea Tehnică a Moldovei) is a higher technical educational institution located in Chișinău, Moldova, and is the only such institute in the country to be accredited by the state.

== History ==
The Technical University of Moldova was founded in 1964, under the name The Polytechnic Institute of Chișinău, as an education center with engineering and economic specialties transferred from the Moldova State University.

The university had begun with 5,140 students and 278 teachers within 5 faculties: Electrotechnics, Mechanics, Technology, Construction and Economy. Since 1964, the university has grown extensively, producing 66,000 specialists and becoming an important educational, scientific and cultural center.

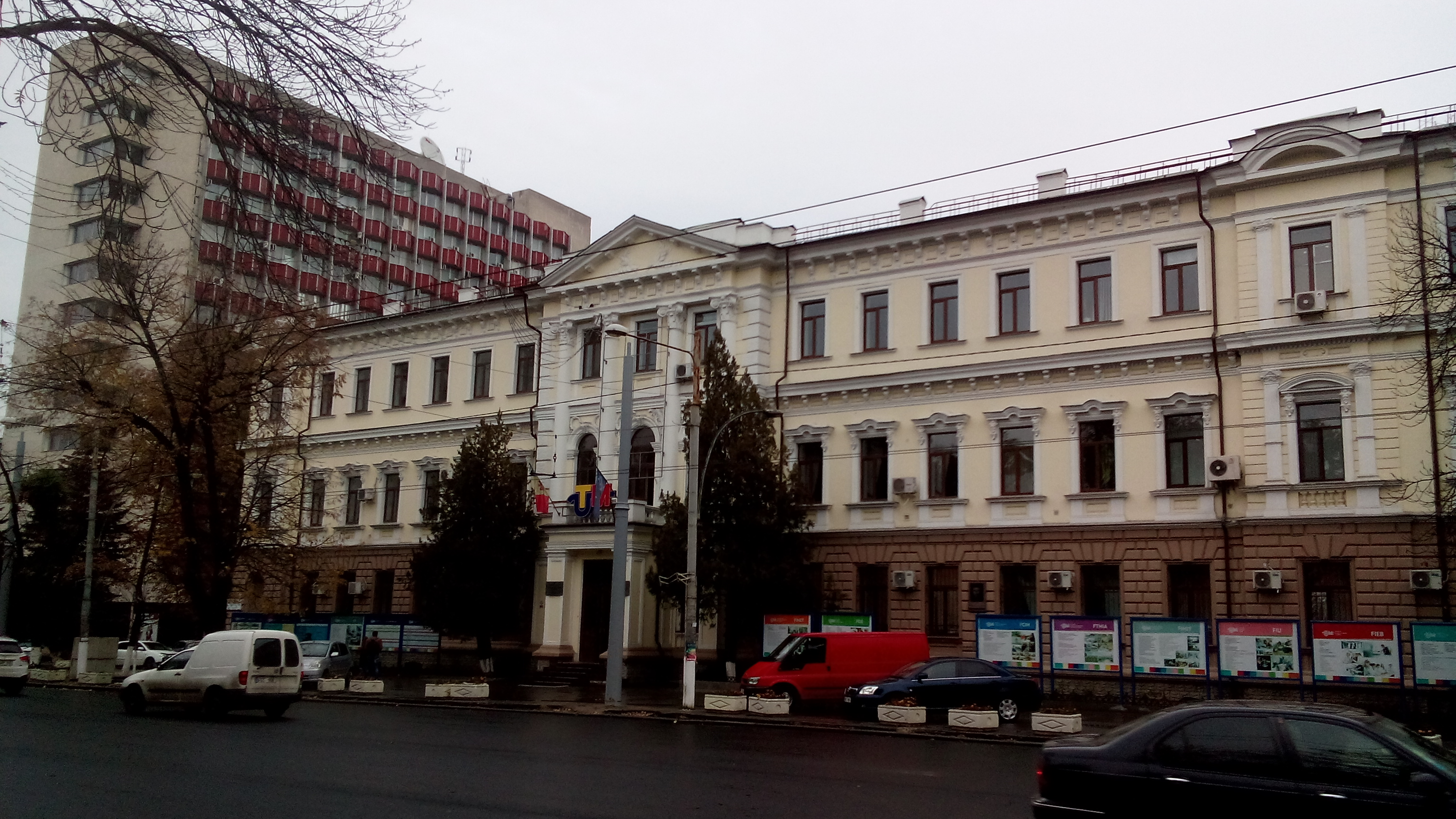

On 15 July 2022, TUMnanoSAT, Moldova's first satellite, built by the Technical University of Moldova, was launched into space.

In 2022, it integrated the State Agrarian University of Moldova into its structures.

== Faculties ==
The university offers courses in about 80 specialties and specialisations, within the following 11 faculties:

- Electronics and Telecommunications
- Energetics and Electrical Engineering
- Computers, Informatics and Microelectronics
- Mechanical Engineering and Transport
- Food Technology
- Architecture and Urban Planning
- Construction, Geodesy and Cadastre
- Economic Engineering and Business
- Design
- Agriculture, Forestry and Environmental Sciences
- Veterinary Medicine

== Basketball ==
UTM features a team that competes in the Moldovan Super League.

== See also ==
- List of universities in Moldova
- Education in Moldova
