= TUMnanoSAT =

Nanosatellite and first satellite of Moldova

- Operator: Technical University of Moldova
- COSPAR ID: 1998-067UD
- SATCAT no.: 53464
- Website: Official website
- Mission duration: 5 months and 19 days

Spacecraft properties
- Manufacturer: Technical University of Moldova

Start of mission
- Launch date: 15 July 2022
- Rocket: Falcon 9
- Launch site: Kennedy LC-39A
- Contractor: SpaceX

End of mission
- Decay date: 31 January 2023

TUMnanoSAT was a nanosatellite and the first artificial satellite made by Moldova. It was built by the Technical University of Moldova (UTM) and was launched on 15 July 2022. SpaceX's Falcon 9 rocket carried TUMnanoSAT to the International Space Station (ISS). This was through the SpaceX CRS-25 Commercial Resupply Service mission. In this mission, Falcon 9 carried a SpaceX Dragon 2 spacecraft which contained the J-SSOD launch capsule of the Japan Aerospace Exploration Agency (JAXA) within which in turn was TUMnanoSAT. The satellite project and its launch was carried out in cooperation with the JAXA and the United Nations Office for Outer Space Affairs (UNOOSA) as part of the KiboCUBE program. Once brought to the ISS, TUMnanoSAT was put into orbit from there on 12 August.

The main missions of TUMnanoSAT were to achieve an efficient communications system between the satellite and its ground station, to study the reliability of electronic components when exposed to space radiation, to test the satellite's system for supply of solar power to find out the most appropriate form of distributing the accumulated energy and to observe the behavior of the satellite's nanosensors and micro-wires in open space and of the sensors of the satellite's subsystem to determine and optimize the performance of the satellite.

After the launch of TUMnanoSAT on 15 July, the UTM and Moldcell organized a public lecture dedicated to the satellite's fabrication and mission attended by several children and adolescents to introduce them to the fields of innovation and technology.

TUMnanoSAT reentered the atmosphere on 31 January 2023.
