= Ion Tudose =

Bessarabian politician

Member of the Moldovan Parliament
- In office 1917–1918

Personal details
- Born: 10 October 1884 Hâjdieni

Ion Tudose (10 October 1884 in Hâjdieni) was a Bessarabian politician.

== Biography ==
He served as Member of the Moldovan Parliament (1917–1918).

== Gallery ==
Moldovan stamp, 1998
