= Valentina Bodrug-Lungu =

Moldovan gender specialist

- Born: 24 February 1961 (age 65); Chișinău, Moldavian SSR, Soviet Union
- Occupation: Academic

Academic background
- Education: Moldova State University
- Thesis: Theory and methodology of gender education (2009)
- Academic advisor: Vladimir Guțu

Academic work
- Discipline: Gender studies
- Sub-discipline: Gender and the family

Valentina Bodrug-Lungu (born 24 February 1961) is a gender studies scholar from Moldova, who is the founder and President of Gender Centru, which is a non-governmental organisation that seeks to educate Moldovan society on gender issues. She is also associate professor in the Faculty of Psychology and Pedagogy at Moldova State University and pioneered gender studies as a discipline there.

== Career ==
Educated at Moldova State University, Bodrug-Lungu was awarded her PhD in 2009 with a thesis entitled 'Theory and methodology of gender education'. In 2006 she co-produced the Shadow Report submitted to the 36th Session of Committee on the Elimination of Discrimination against Women.

Bodrug-Lungu founded and became President of Gender Centru, which is a non-governmental organisation that seeks to educate Moldovan society on gender issues. She is also the co-founder of the Platform for Gender Equality, Moldova. She is a member of Moldova's National Council for Participation.

UN Women credits Bodrug-Lungu with the establishment of gender education in Moldovan universities through her role in establishing a MA course which incorporates the topic. In the 1990s she also developed pre-university syllabi for schools focussing on „Educaţiei pentru viaţa de familie” (Education for family life). She is also associate professor in the Faculty of Psychology and Pedagogy at Moldova State University. She has published six monographs and over fifty articles on gender and the family in Moldova. Her work has also been cited as part of a group of scholarship that argues that gender identity is impacted by the school environment, as well as the family.

From 2010 to 2015, Bodrug-Lungu participated in the development of Moldova's National Program for gender equality. When discussing the gender wage gap, Bodrug-Lungu has described how the country is caught between "patriarchy, traditionalism and modernism". She has also been outspoken on the need for young people to be educated about sexual harassment, as well as how the political climate in the country is not conducive to women's participation in politics - despite their female president, Maia Sandu. In 2012 she visited Austria at the invitation of Südwind Association to discuss the potential for closer relationships between the countries.

== Recognition ==
In 2012 she was awarded the Moldovan Ordinul "Gloria Muncii" (Order of Work Glory).

== Selected works ==
- Bodrug-Lungu, Valentina. "Families in Moldova." Families in eastern Europe. Vol. 5. Emerald Group Publishing Limited, 2004. 173–186.
- Bodrug-Lungu, Valentina. "Gendering Higher Education Curricula at Moldova State University." UNESCO-CEPES (2011): 73.
- Bodrug-Lungu, Valentina, and Erin Kostina-Ritchey. "Demographic Trends and the Healthcare System in Moldova: Reforms and Challenges." Family and Health: Evolving Needs, Responsibilities, and Experiences. Vol. 8. Emerald Group Publishing Limited, 2014. 105–130.
- Ganea, Eugenia.; Bodrug-Lungu, Valentina. Addressing Inequality in Vocational/Technical Education by Eliminating Gender Bias. Romanian Journal for Multidimensional Education [s. l.], v. 10, n. 4, p. 136–155, 2018. DOI 10.18662/rrem/78.
- Bodrug-Lungu, Valentina, and Mihaela Robila. "Family policies in Moldova." Handbook of family policies across the globe (2014): 211–222.
