= B. P. Hasdeu Theatre =

Public theatre in Moldova

Coordinates: 45.90387°N 28.18839°E

- Teatrul „B. P. Hasdeu”
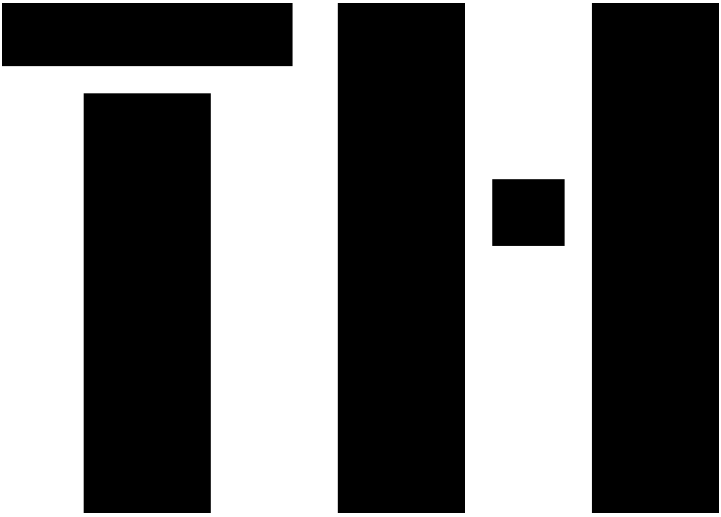
- Interactive map of B. P. Hasdeu Theatre
- Address: Cahul; Moldova
- Owner: Ministry of Culture
- Current use: live theatre

Construction
- Opened: 1987

Website
- teatrulcahul.md

The B. P. Hasdeu Theatre (Romanian: Teatrul „B. P. Hasdeu”) in Cahul, Moldova, is a public theatre founded in 1987. It was given the name of the Romanian writer Bogdan Petriceicu Hasdeu. Cahul Musical-Drama Theatre is the only professional theatre company in the southern region of Moldova.

== History ==
The Musical-Drama Theatre was founded on 25 March 1987, by graduates of the Academy of Music, Theatre and Fine Arts of Chișinău. On 17 October 1987, the inauguration festivities took place with the play Trei crai de la răsărit (Three magi from the east), by B.P. Hasdeu.

=== Building ===
In 1997, the old building of the theatre was demolished as a result of basement floods and landslides, and all plays and performances moved to the former building of the Cahul Court. In February 2016, the construction works for a new building (with a hall of 340 seats) started. The construction is built with a grant provided by the Government of Romania.
