= Alecu Russo State University of Bălți =

University in Bălți, Moldova

Coordinates: 47°45′17.52″N 27°55′17.98″E

- Universitatea de Stat „Alecu Russo” din Bălți
- Former names: Teachers Institute of Bălți (1945–1953); Pedagogical Institute of Bălți (1953–1959); Alecu Russo Pedagogical Institute (1959–1992)
- Motto: Scientia, Cultura (Latin)
- Motto in English: Science, Culture
- Type: Public
- Established: 1945
- Rector: Natalia Gașițoi
- Faculty: 358
- Students: 5,795
- Location: 38 Alexander Pushkin Street, Bălți, MD-3100, Moldova
- Website: usarb.md

The Alecu Russo State University of Bălți (USARB; Romanian: Universitatea de Stat „Alecu Russo” din Bălți) is a university located in Bălți, Moldova. It was named after the 19th century Romanian illuminist and ethnologist Alecu Russo.

== History ==
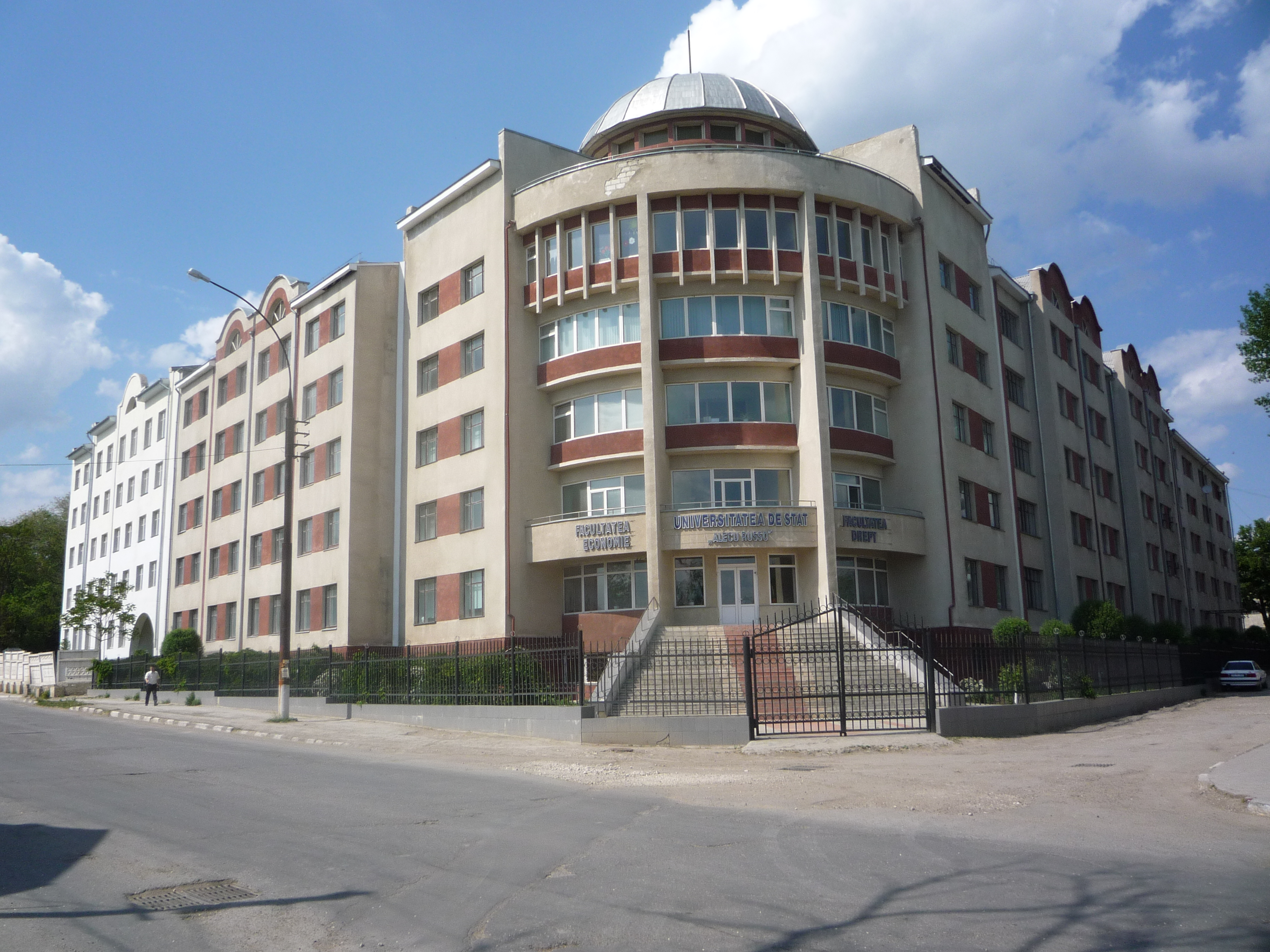

The original complex of buildings in the 1930s housed the financial administration, three high schools (two of which were girls-only) and has the characteristic architecture of the time. The institution was founded in 1945. Languages (English, French, German, Romanian, Russian, Ukrainian), mathematics, physics, some engineering, law, economics, music education, pedagogy, sociology, and psychology are offered at Bachelor and Master levels. There is a Ph.D. programme. Many of its buildings have been added or refurbished more recently. The courses and specialties are offered in Romanian, Russian, Ukrainian, and English. The university houses one of the biggest libraries in the southeastern Europe, and is an important member of the implementation of the Bologna process in Moldova.

== Faculties ==
Alecu Russo Balti State University faculties:

- Faculty of Real Sciences
- Faculty of Philology
- Faculty of Foreign Languages and Literatures
- Faculty of Psychology and Social Work
- Faculty of Sciences of Education and Arts
- Faculty of Law
- Faculty of Economics
- Faculty of Natural Science and Agroecology

== Notable professors and alumni ==
=== Alumni ===
- Vasile Drăgănel (born 1962), Moldovan police general
- Irina Lozovan (born 1983), Moldovan politician
- Ilie Motrescu (1941–1969), Romanian writer and publicist
- Tatiana Potîng (born 1971), Moldovan politician
- Mihail Șleahtițchi (born 1956), Moldovan pedagogue, psychologist, university professor and politician
- Renato Usatîi (born 1978), Moldovan politician and businessman

=== Professors ===
- Nicolae Filip (1926–2009), Moldovan physicist
- Tatiana Potîng (born 1971), Moldovan politician

== See also ==
- List of universities in Moldova
- Education in Moldova
