= Cahul =

- Municipality
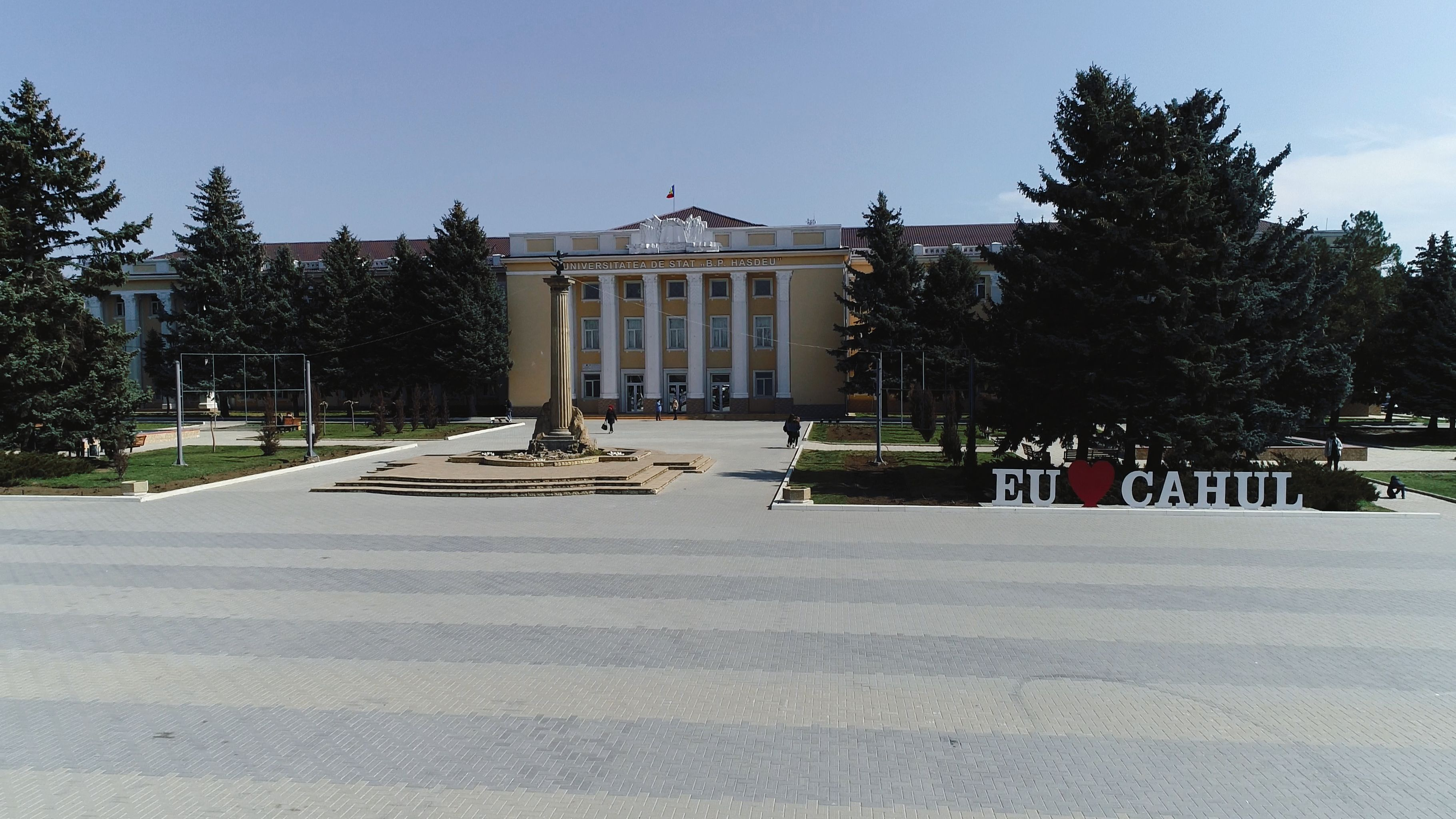
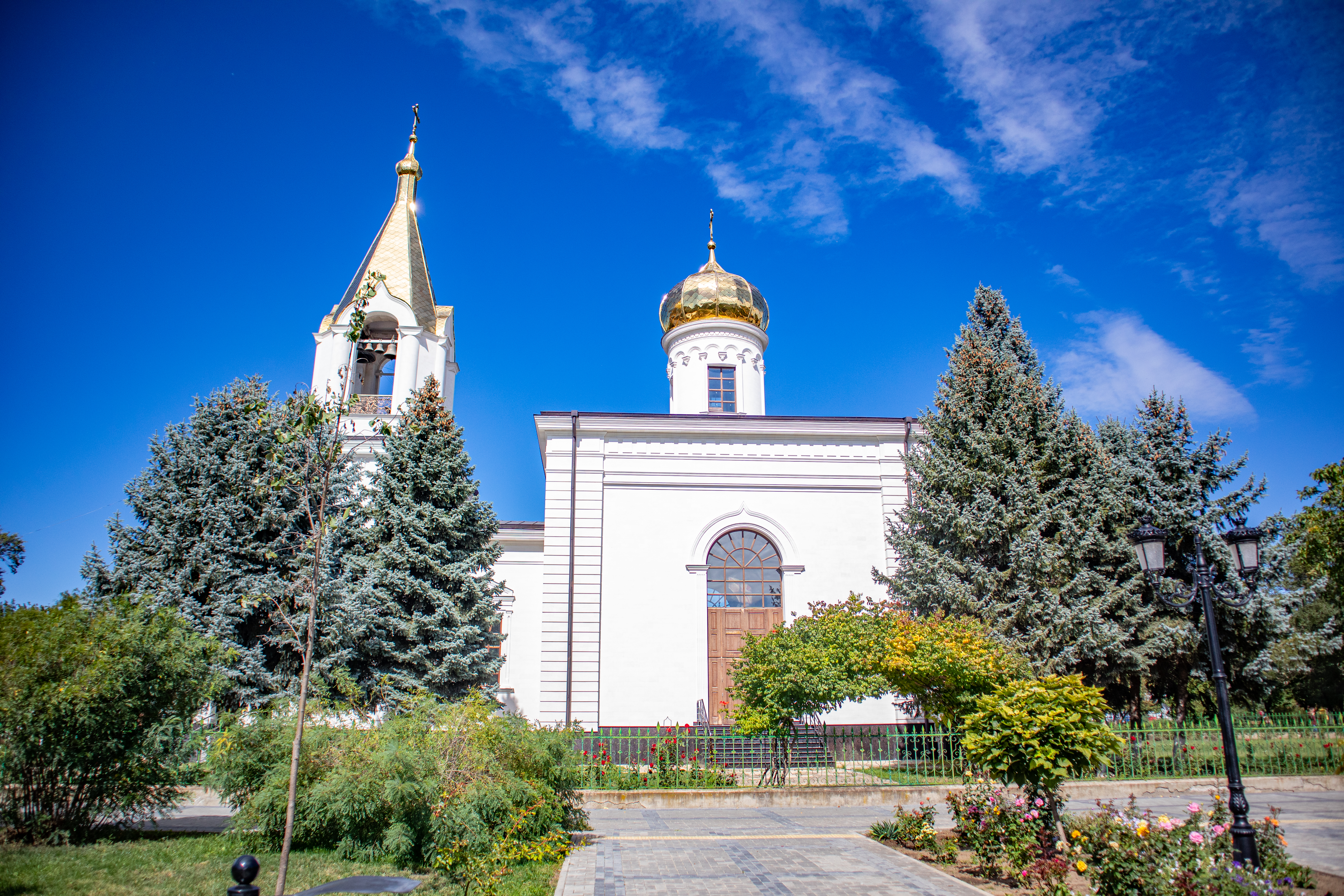
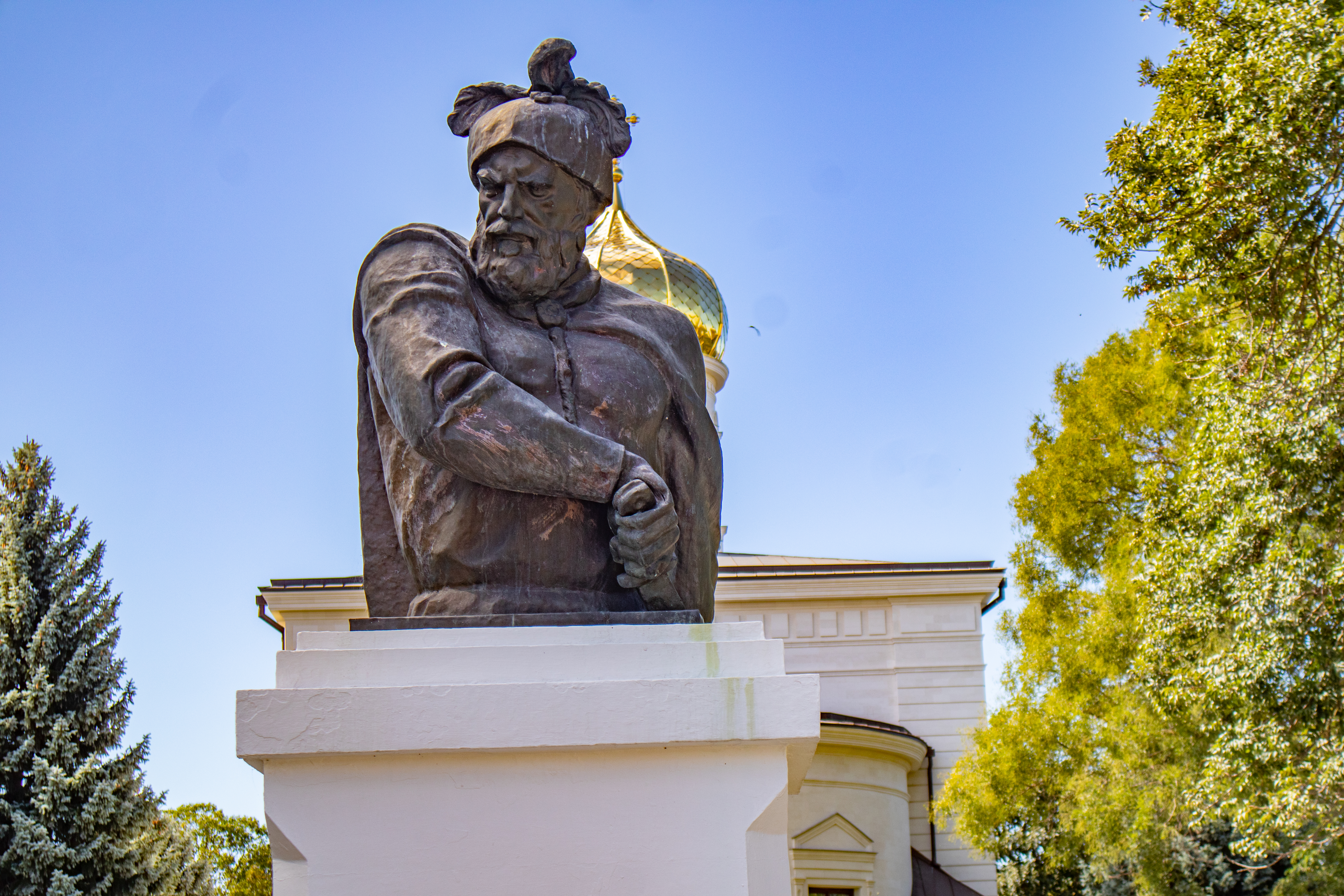
- From top, left to right: Bogdan Petriceicu Hasdeu State University of Cahul, Saint Michael Cathedral, John III the Terrible Monument

- Coat of arms

- Location of Cahul within Moldova
- Coordinates: 45°55′0″N 28°11′01″E
- Country: Moldova
- District: Cahul District
- Founded: 1502 (first official record)

Government
  - Mayor: Nicolae Dandiș (Independent)

Area
  - Total: 33.91 km^{2} (13.09 sq mi)
- Elevation: 119 m (390 ft)

Population (2014)
  - Total: 30,018
  - Density: 12,124/km^{2} (31,400/sq mi)
- Time zone: UTC+2 (EET)
  - Summer (DST): UTC+3 (EEST)
- Website: Official website

Cahul (Romanian: [kaˈhul]; also known by alternative names) is a city and municipality in southern Moldova. The city is the administrative center of Cahul District; it also administers one village, Cotihana. As of 2014 census, the city has a population of 30,018.

== Etymology and names ==
The city of Cahul (Russian: Кагул, romanized: Kagul, Bulgarian: Кахул, romanized: Kahul) is believed to have been inhabited for many centuries, although it has had a number of different names over the years – the name Scheia (Old Romanian for "Bulgarian") was recorded in 1502, and the name Frumoasa ("Beautiful" in Romanian) was recorded in 1716. The modern name was given to the settlement after the Battle of Kagul, which was fought nearby.

== History ==
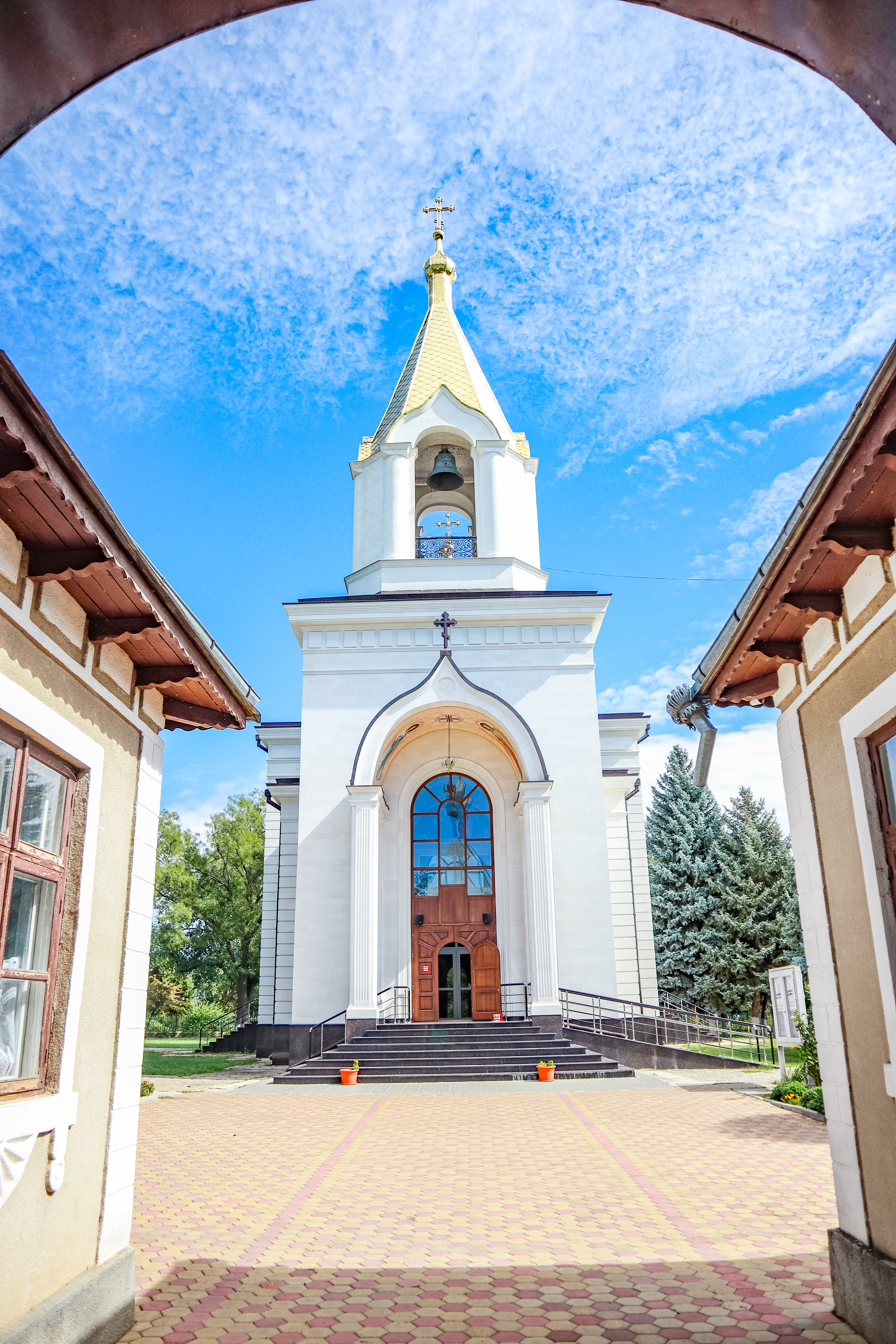
Cathedral of the Holy Archangel Michael (1837)

The city's location had made it a frequent battleground for a number of armies, with possession of frequently switching between countries such as Principality of Moldavia, Russian Empire, Ottoman Empire.

The city was a part of Moldavia before 1812, then Russia from 1812 to 1856, then again Moldavia/Romanian Principalities (1856–1878), then Russia again (1878–1918), then Romania again (1918–1940), then the Soviet Union (1940–1941), then Romania again (1941–1944), the Soviet Union again (1944–1991) and finally Moldova (1991 to the present).

Apart from the battles that have been fought over it, Cahul is also known for its thermal spas and for its folk music.

== Climate ==
Cahul has a humid continental-type climate (Köppen climate classification "Dfa" – hot-summer subtype) with four distinct seasons. Average monthly precipitation ranges from about 28 mm (1.1 in) in October to 76 mm (3 in) in June.

Climate data for Cahul, Moldova (1991–2020, extremes 1947–present)
Month	Jan	Feb	Mar	Apr	May	Jun	Jul	Aug	Sep	Oct	Nov	Dec	Year
Record high °C (°F)	17.1 (62.8)	20.9 (69.6)	26.0 (78.8)	30.6 (87.1)	37.0 (98.6)	38.3 (100.9)	40.3 (104.5)	39.3 (102.7)	35.3 (95.5)	30.8 (87.4)	24.5 (76.1)	17.4 (63.3)	39.4 (102.9)
Mean daily maximum °C (°F)	1.4 (34.5)	4.2 (39.6)	10.0 (50.0)	16.7 (62.1)	22.5 (72.5)	26.4 (79.5)	28.9 (84.0)	28.9 (84.0)	23.2 (73.8)	16.2 (61.2)	9.1 (48.4)	3.0 (37.4)	15.9 (60.6)
Daily mean °C (°F)	−1.6 (29.1)	0.3 (32.5)	5.0 (41.0)	11.0 (51.8)	16.7 (62.1)	20.7 (69.3)	23.0 (73.4)	22.8 (73.0)	17.4 (63.3)	11.3 (52.3)	5.4 (41.7)	0.0 (32.0)	11.0 (51.8)
Mean daily minimum °C (°F)	−4.2 (24.4)	−2.8 (27.0)	1.1 (34.0)	6.2 (43.2)	11.6 (52.9)	15.6 (60.1)	17.7 (63.9)	17.3 (63.1)	12.5 (54.5)	7.4 (45.3)	2.6 (36.7)	−2.5 (27.5)	6.9 (44.4)
Record low °C (°F)	−24.9 (−12.8)	−25.8 (−14.4)	−17.5 (0.5)	−4.6 (23.7)	1.3 (34.3)	5.3 (41.5)	9.0 (48.2)	5.4 (41.7)	−3.0 (26.6)	−7.1 (19.2)	−15.8 (3.6)	−21.7 (−7.1)	−25.8 (−14.4)
Average precipitation mm (inches)	28 (1.1)	25 (1.0)	31 (1.2)	39 (1.5)	51 (2.0)	68 (2.7)	59 (2.3)	46 (1.8)	51 (2.0)	46 (1.8)	35 (1.4)	36 (1.4)	516 (20.3)
Average precipitation days (≥ 1.0 mm)	6	5	6	6	8	7	6	5	4	5	5	6	69
Average relative humidity (%)	84	82	75	67	65	66	64	64	67	74	83	86	73
Mean monthly sunshine hours	82	111	160	208	273	299	325	304	228	168	91	78	2,323
Source 1: NOAA
Source 2: Serviciul Hidrometeorologic de Stat (extremes, relative humidity)

== Demographics ==
According to the 2024 census, 22,223 inhabitants lived in Cahul (making it the eighth largest city in Moldova), a decrease compared to the previous census in 2014, when 30,018 inhabitants were registered.

Ethnic composition of Cahul (2024)
1. Moldovans (Note: There is an ongoing controversy regarding the ethnic identification of Moldovans and Romanians.) (72.2%)
2. Romanians (5.00%)
3. Russians (7.80%)
4. Ukrainians (6.50%)
5. Bulgarians (5.10%)
6. Gagauz (2.40%)
7. Others (1.00%)
Linguistic composition of Cahul (2024)
1. Moldovan (Note: In March 2023, the Parliament of Moldova passed a law updating all legislative texts and the constitution to refer to the national language as Romanian, effectively rendering the term "Moldovan" obsolete.) (42.0%)
2. Romanian (26.4%)
3. Russian (26.2%)
4. Ukrainian (2.10%)
5. Bulgarian (1.90%)
6. Gagauz (1.00%)
7. Other (0.30%)

Historical population
Year	Pop.	±%
1897	7,077	—
1930	11,370	+60.7%
1959	16,223	+42.7%
1970	26,249	+61.8%
1979	33,109	+26.1%
1989	42,904	+29.6%
2004	36,805	−14.2%
2014	30,018	−18.4%
2024	22,223	−26.0%

As of 1920, the population was estimated to be 12,000. Groups settled in the area included Romanians, Jews, Germans, Bulgarians, and Greeks.

== Culture ==
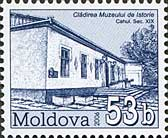
Cahul History Museum

Cahul is home to the Cahul Musical-Drama Theatre, Cahul History Museum, and other public institutions and monuments. Every two years, at the beginning of July, in Cahul takes place an important folk music festival, "Nufărul Alb" ("White waterlilies").

=== Media ===
- Ziuadeazi.md
- dincahul.md

=== Tourism ===
Cahul is also a destination as spa and health resort. The city and surrounding areas are richest with mineral springs enriched with bromine and iodine. The "Nufărul Alb" Balneotherapy and Well-being Centre consists of hospital, hotel and entertaining spots. Cahul has a tourist information point located at the Piata Horelor.

== Education ==
Cahul is home to the State University of Cahul, opened in 1999 and named after Romanian writer and philologist Bogdan Petriceicu Hasdeu. The university is made up of 3 faculties (Philology – History, Law – Public Administration and Business – Computer Science – Mathematics) with around 2,150 students.

== Sport ==
The city has the team of FC Cahul-2005 who play in Moldovan "A" Division. The club has won the Divizia B four times, in 2006–07, 2012–13, 2014–15 and 2016–17. In the city plays also the club FC Speranța Crihana Veche.

== Transport ==
=== Road ===
Cahul is connected by national roads with Chișinău, Giurgiulești, Oancea (Romania) and Reni (Ukraine). Cahul is also a border checkpoint to Romania.

=== Rail ===
The railway station serves the city and is operated by Moldovan Railways. It provides direct rail connections to Chișinău.

=== Air ===
The city is served by the Cahul International Airport located 8 km south-east of the city centre. Currently, the airport has no scheduled flights.

== Twin towns – sister cities ==
Cahul is twinned with:

- Medgidia, Romania
- Vaslui, Romania

== Consulates in Cahul ==
In Cahul is located one of the two Consulates General of Romania in Moldova. On 2 November 2009 the President of Romania Traian Băsescu has signed the decrees on opening of Romanian general consulat in Cahul. "The opening of the Romanian consulates in Bălți and Cahul will be beneficial for the Moldovan people, who have encountered economic and time-related problems as they have to travel to the consulate in Chișinău," Moldova's Foreign Minister Iurie Leancă said, commenting on the Băsescu's decree.

Romania asked the approval for the opening of the consulate as early as in 2006, in order to easy thus the process of granting visas to the Moldovan citizens more easily, after Romania's accession with the European Union on 1 January 2007. Initially, the communist authorities in Chişinău gave their approval for the opening of the two consular offices, but they later came with the condition Romania to accept two consular offices of the Republic of Moldova on its territory too, in Iaşi and Constanţa. Moreover, the former communist rule in Chişinău conditioned the signing of the small border traffic agreement on the signing of the Basic Political Treaty between the two countries and also of the agreement referring to the delimitation of the border.

On 28 January 2010, Traian Băsescu visited the future headquarters of the Romanian consulate in Cahul. Speaking about the opening of the two Romanian consulates in Bălți and Cahul, Băsescu said that the consulate in Cahul could be opened in 2–3 weeks.

The consulate has 17 employees: Consul General, two consuls, two main consular officers, six major referers, two drivers, two skilled workers and two guards. The Consul General is Ms. Anca Corfu.

== Notable people ==
- Serge Klarsfeld (born 1935), Nazi hunter
- Alexandru Cecal (1940–2021), chemist and professor at Alexandru Ioan Cuza University
- Vika Jigulina (born 1986), record producer, singer and disc jockey
- Satoshi (born 1998), singer, songwriter, rapper and composer
