= Hîjdieni =

Hâjdieni
- Village
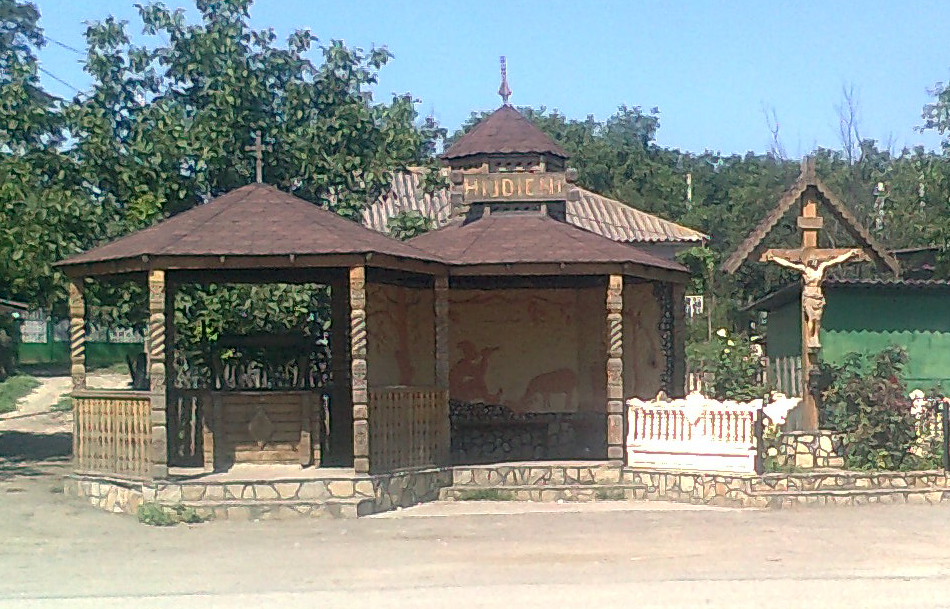
- Hîjdieni, Moldova

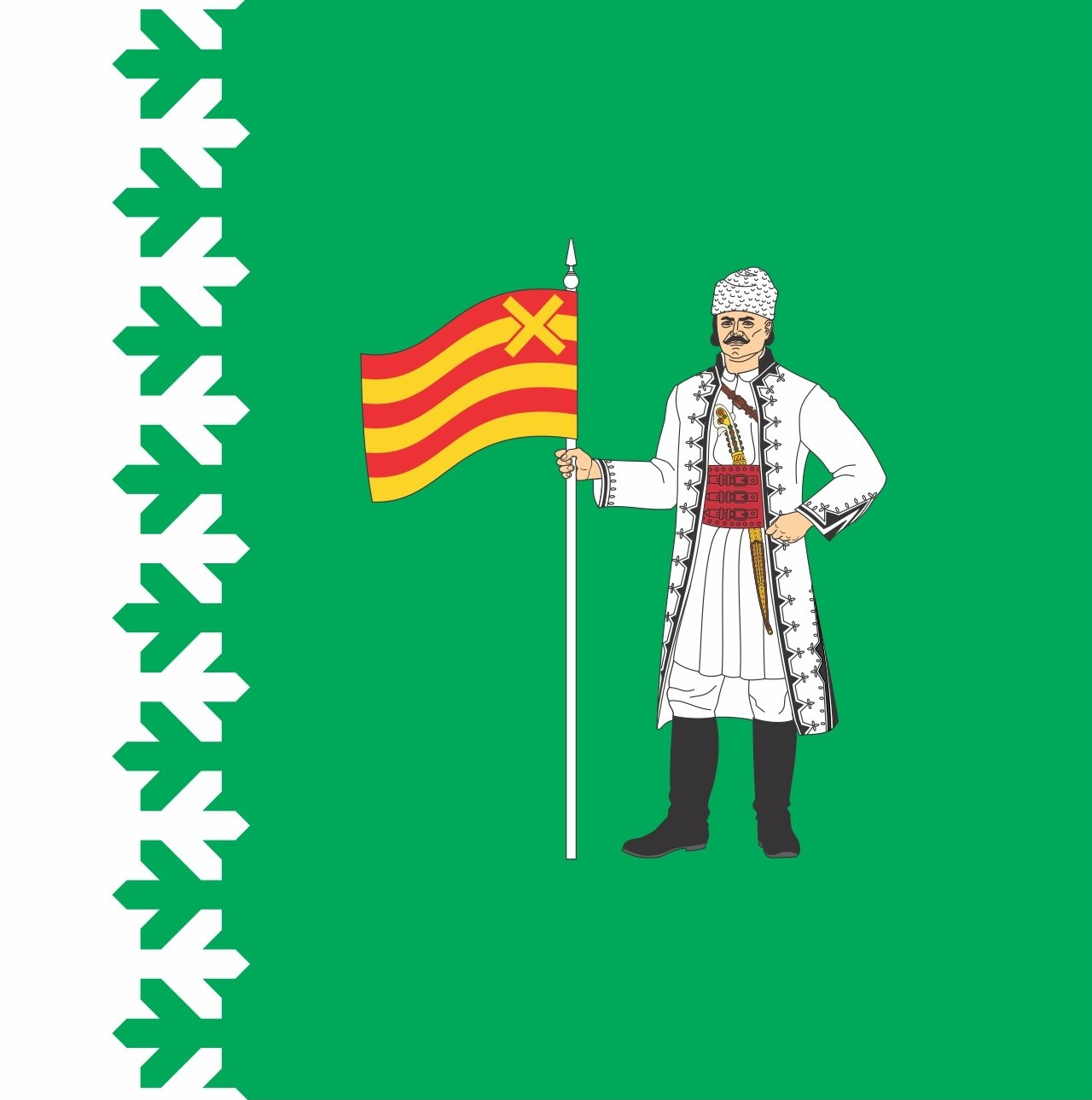
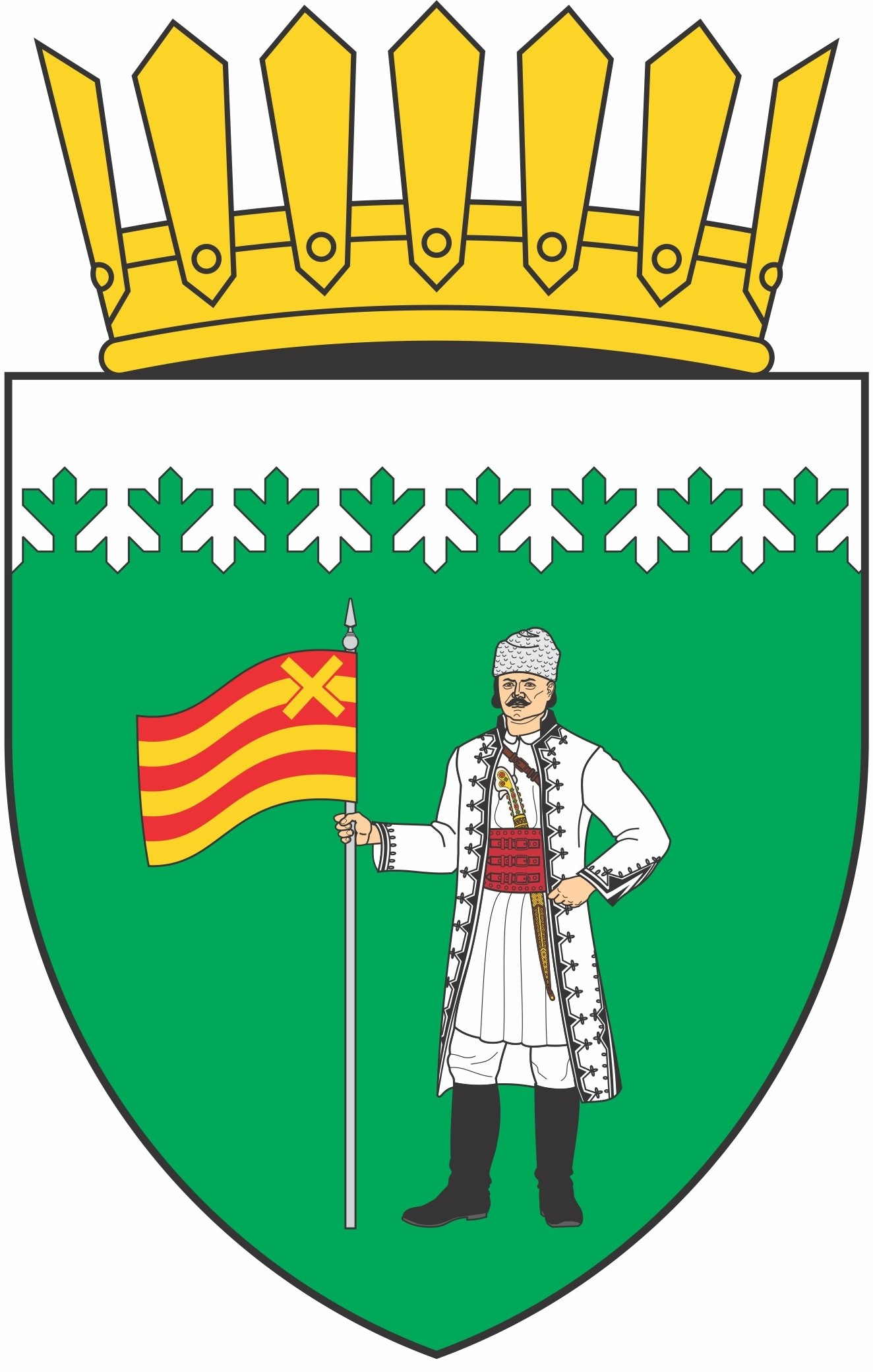
- Flag Seal

- Location in Moldova
- Coordinates: 47°46′N 27°27′E
- Country: Moldova
- District: Glodeni District
- Elevation: 449 ft (137 m)

Population (2014 census)
  - Total: 3,303
- Time zone: UTC+2 (EET)
  - Summer (DST): UTC+3 (EEST)
- Postal code: MD-4924
- Area code: +373 249

Hîjdieni is a village in Glodeni District, Moldova.

== Notable people ==
- Ion Tudose
