= Valentin Belousov =

Russian mathematician (1925–1988)

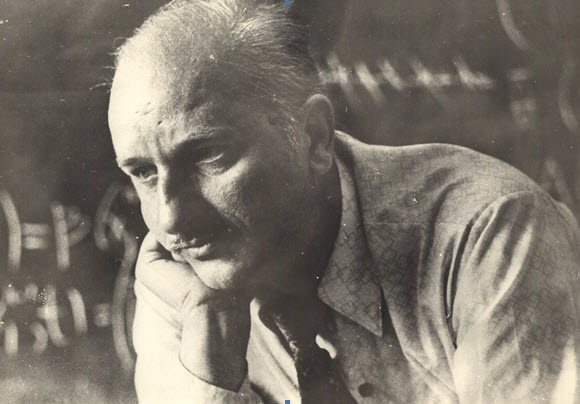
- Born: Valentin Danilovich Belousov; 20 February 1925; Bălți, Kingdom of Romania
- Died: 23 July 1988 (aged 63); Kishinev, Moldavian SSR, Soviet Union
- Education: Kishinev Pedagogical Institute
- Scientific career
- Fields: Mathematics

Valentin Danilovich Belousov (Russian: Валенти́н Дани́лович Белоу́сов; 20 February 1925 – 23 July 1988) was a Soviet and Moldovan mathematician and a corresponding member of the Academy of Pedagogical Sciences of the USSR (1968).

He graduated from the Kishinev Pedagogical Institute (1947), Doctor of Physical and Mathematical Sciences (1966), Professor (1967), honored worker of science and technology of the Moldavian SSR.

Since 1962, he worked at the Institute of Mathematics, Academy of Sciences of the Moldavian SSR. Major works include algebra, especially the theory of quasigroups and their applications. Known for his book "Fundamentals of the theory of quasigroups and loops" (1967), textbooks for schools. Laureate of the State Prize in Science and Technology of the Moldavian SSR.

Honored Worker of Science and Technology of MSSR (1970). Laureate of the State Prize for Science and Technology MSSR (1982). He is the founder of the theory of quasi-groups at school in the former USSR.

== Milestones in the scientific life ==
- 1944–1947 – student of the Pedagogical Institute in Kishinev,
- 1947–1948 – teacher training courses at the Kishinev Pedagogical Institute,
- 1948–1950 – a teacher and head teacher of high school, the village Sofia Balti district,
- 1950–1954 – Lecturer, Department of Mathematics, Balti Pedagogical Institute,
- 1954–1955 – student of the postgraduate courses at MSU. Lomonosov,
- 1955–1956 – post-graduate student of Moscow State University. M.V.Lomonosov,
- 1957–1960 – Lecturer, Department of Mathematics, Balti Pedagogical Institute,
- 1960–1961 – intern University of Wisconsin (exchange between the USSR and the USA), the State of Madison, USA,
- 1961–1962 – Head of the Department of Mathematics Balti Pedagogical Institute,
- 1962–1987 – Head of the Department at the Institute of Mathematics of the MSSR,
- 1964–1966 – Associate Professor, Department of Mathematics Technical University (part-time),
- 1966–1988 – Professor, Head of Department (until 1977) of higher algebra Kishinev State University (part-time).

== Scientific heritage ==
=== Theses of V. D. Belousov ===
- Studies in the theory of quasigroups and loops (1958) – PhD thesis.
- Systems of quasigroups with identities (1966) – doctoral thesis.

(Both of the above are protected at the Moscow State University M. V. Lomonosov).

- Field of study – theory of quasi-groups, related areas

=== Research areas ===
- The general theory of quasi-groups (derivative operations; core; regular substitution, groups associated with quasigroups; autotopies; antiavtotopii et al.).
- Classes binary quasigroups and loops (distributive quasigroups, left distributive quasigroup, IP-quasigroup, F-quasigroups, CI-quasigroup, I-quasigroups Bol loops, totally symmetric quasigroups and quasigroup Stein et al.)
- Quasigroups a balanced identities. Systems of quasigroups with identities (associative, medial, transitivity, distributivity, Stein et al.)
- Functional equations on quasigroups (general associativity with the same procedure and the various variables, the total Distributivity, loops, medial, and others.)
- Positional algebra (algebra Belousov) (apparatus for solving functional equations)
- n-ary and infinitary quasigroup (we laid the foundations of the theory of n-ary quasigroups and infinitary)
- Algebraic networks and quasigroups (general theory, the conditions of circuit configuration)
- Combinatorial questions of the theory of quasi-groups (continued quasigroups, orthogonal systems and binary

n-ary operations and quasigroups parastrophic orthogonal quasigroups):

=== Books ===
- Fundamentals of the theory of quasigroups and loops. M .: Nauka, 1967.
- Algebraic networks and quasigroups. Kishinev Shtiintsa 1971.
- n-ary quasigroup. Kishinev, Ştiinţa 1972.
- Changes in algebraic networks. Kishinev, Ştiinţa 1979.
- Elements of the theory of quasi-groups (Textbook on a special course). Kishinev, Kishinev State University, 1981.
- Latin squares and their applications. Kishinev, Ştiinţa, 1989 (collab. with G.B.Belyavskaya with GB).
- Mathematics in schools of Moldova (1812–1972). Kishinev, Ştiinţa1973 (collab. with I.I.Lupu and Y.I.Neagu).
- Russian-Moldovan Mathematics Dictionary. 1980, Kishinev, Moldavian Soviet Encyclopedia (collab. with Y.I.Neagu)
- IK Man. Pages of life and creativity. Kishinev, Ştiinţa, 1983 (collab. with Y.I.Neagu)

== Educational activity ==
Valentin Danilovich Belousov was not only a scientist but also an excellent teacher. He has made important contributions in the system of education of Moldova and in training of Moldovan mathematicians. As a member of the Academy of Pedagogical Sciences (Mathematics section), he spent a great scientific and organizational work in the field of mathematics education. About 30 of his students defended their theses and work in many countries. Valentin Belousov and Y. I. Neagu wrote Moldovan-Russian Dictionary of Mathematics, which has long been used by mathematicians in Moldova. Together with I. I. Lupu and Y. I. Neagu, V. D. Belousov published a book of mathematics in schools of Moldova (1812–1972). For many years, V. D. Belousov was the chairman of the jury of school mathematical Olympiads of Moldova.

=== Trainees and graduates ===
Under the direction of Valentin Danilovich 22 mathematics from different republics of the former Soviet Union and from abroad defended their theses, four of them also defended their doctoral dissertations.

== Social work ==
In parallel with the scientific and pedagogical activity Valentin Danilovich spent big public work as a deputy Balti City Council (1960–1962), member of the District Committee of the CPM (1967–1973), member of the Supreme Council of Moldova (1975–1980), member of the Presidium of the Society "Knowledge", a member of editorial boards of various domestic and foreign publications, organizing committee member of many international conferences.

== Family ==
Father Daniel Afinogenovich Belousov (1897–1956), was an officer in the army of Tsarist Russia (graduated from military school in Tbilisi). He took part in World War I. In Moldova, he worked at the post office in the city of Bălți. Mother of Valentin Danilovich, Elena K. Belousov (Garbu) (1897–1982), also worked at the post office.

Wife – Belousov (Bondareva) Elizabeth Feodorovna (5 May 1925 – 26 November 1991). Philologist, she taught at the State University of Moldova.

Children: Alexander Valentinovich (03.10.1948 – 3 September 1998), PhD in physics, senior research fellow of the Academy of Sciences of Moldova; Tatiana Valentinovna Kravchenko (born 16 February 1952), a doctor neurologist.

Brother: MD Victor Danilovich Belousov (b. 1927) traumatologist orthopedic, the author of the monograph "Road traffic accidents. First aid to victims (1984) and Conservative treatment of false joints of long bones (1990).

== Awards and titles ==
For merits in the field of science, education and social activities, he was awarded the Order of the Red Banner of Labour (1961), Honorary Diploma of the Presidium of the Supreme Soviet of the Moldavian Soviet Socialist Republic (1967), he was elected as correspondent member of the Academy of Pedagogical Sciences the USSR (1968). He was honored worker of science of Moldova (1970), laureate of the State Prize of Moldova in the field of science and technology (1972). Overachiever of the Education of Moldova (1980).

== Foreign tours ==
Despite the strict controls in those years by the government, Valentin Danilovich received permission to research trips abroad and many times traveled abroad:

- 1960–1961 – United States
- 1964, 1976 – Hungary
- 1967, 1972, 1977 – Bulgaria
- 1968, 1974,1981 – Yugoslavia
- 1967, 1969–1970 – Canada
- 1968 – Sierra Leone
- 1975 – East Germany

== School of Belousov ==
The lifework of Valentin Danilovich Belousov is continued by his numerous disciples and followers in various countries, whose number is constantly increasing. In 1994 at the initiative of the students of V. D. Belousov at the Institute of Mathematics and Computer Science of the ASM was established the scientific journal "Quasigroups and Related Systems (http://www.quasigroups.eu/)'", now known all over the world. For twenty years this magazine published many articles by both Moldovan and foreign specialists in the theory of quasi-groups and regions close to it. Since 1995, the Institute of Mathematics and Computer Science of the ASM annual anniversary of Valentin Danilovich (20 February) has carried out advanced algebraic seminars in memory of Valentin Danilovich Belousov. In this workshop, his disciples and followers from Moldova and other countries take stock of the past year and report on new results in the theory of quasi-groups and related areas.

Thanks to the productive scientific and pedagogical activity of V. D. Belousov, in the Republic of Moldova was founded on the theory of quasigroups Belousov's School on Theory of Quasigroups, consisting of his 22 disciples (http://belousov.scerb.com/), and more than 40 followers continue his work in Moldova and abroad.
