= Moldova State University =

University located in Chișinău, Moldova

Coordinates: 47.0185°N 28.8235°E

- Universitatea de Stat din Moldova
- Latin: Universitas Status Moldaviae
- Motto: Vitae discimus (Latin)
- Motto in English: For life we learn
- Type: Public
- Established: 1 October 1946; 79 years ago
- Rector: Otilia Dandara
- Academic staff: 1,145
- Students: 20,563
- Location: 60 Alexei Mateevici Street, Chișinău, MD-2009, Moldova
- Campus: Urban
- Language: Romanian, English, Russian, French
- Website: usm.md

University rankings

Regional – Overall
- QS Emerging Europe and Central Asia: 301–350 (2022)

Moldova State University (USM; Romanian: Universitatea de Stat din Moldova) is a university located in Chișinău, Moldova. It was founded in 1946, and initially had five faculties, Physics and Mathematics, Geology and Pedology, History and Philology, Biology, and Chemistry. It became a plenipotentiary member of the International Association of Universities in 1969. Notable faculty include mathematicians Valentin Belousov and Israel Gohberg. Notable alumni include gender studies scholar Valentina Bidrug-Lungu.

== History ==
The university was founded on 1 October 1946 as Chișinău State University. Initially, it had 320 students enrolled in 5 faculties: Physics and Mathematics, Geology and Pedology, History and Philology, Biology, and Chemistry. Within the 12 departments, there were 35 teachers. Among the initiators of the founding of the university were Macarie Radu and Mihail Pavlov.

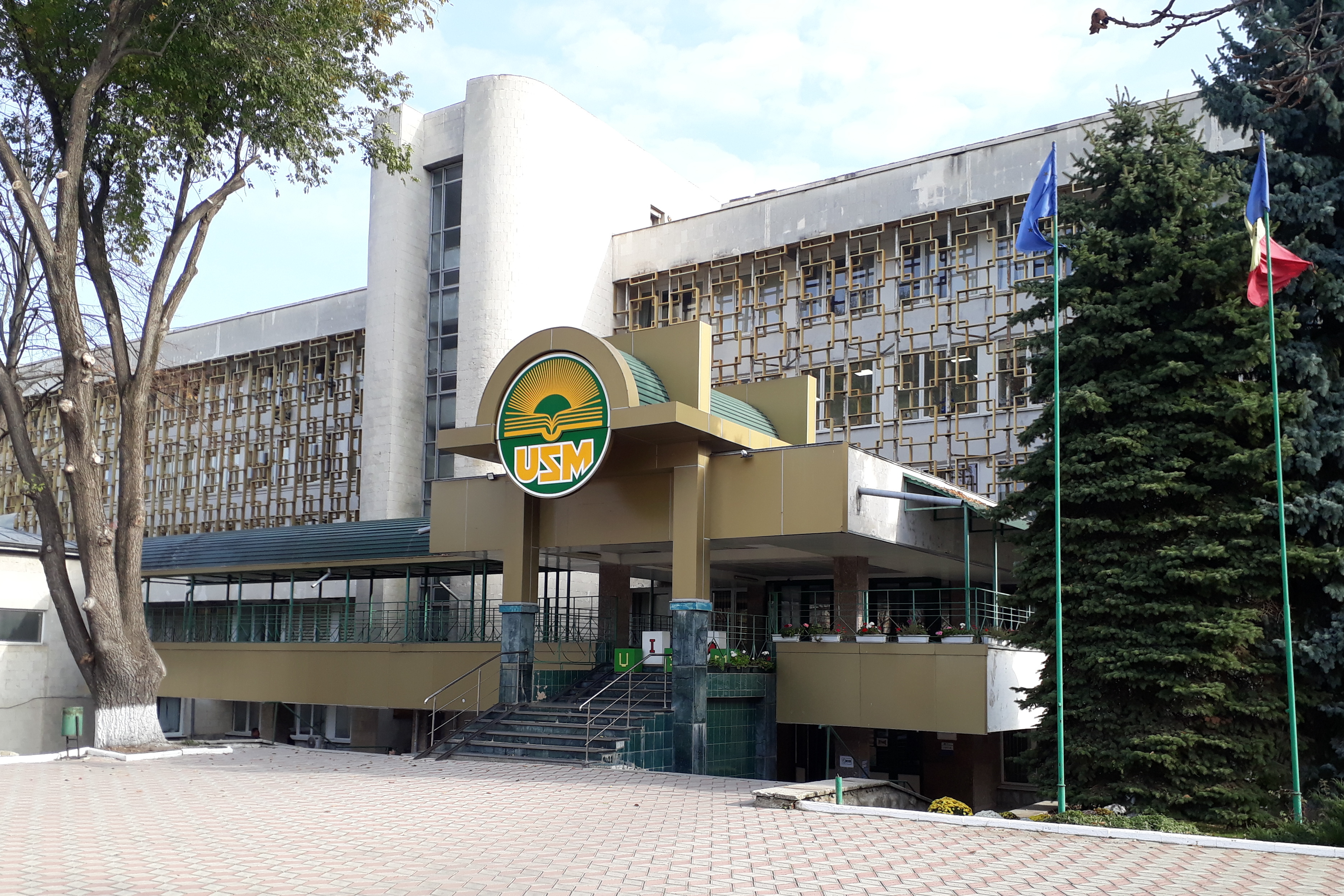

In 1969, the State University of Moldova joined the International Association of Universities as a plenipotentiary member. The prestige of the State University of Moldova on the international arena has been strengthened by the 14 scientists and cultures of 9 countries of the world who have been awarded the title of Doctor Honoris Causa of Moldova State University. The State University of Moldova has concluded more than 60 cooperation agreements in the field of education and science with university centers in 25 countries. Moldova State University has admitted students from about 80 countries.

On 8 February 2024, there was a fire at the NATO Information and Documentation Centre in the campus of the university. The university's authorities claimed this was an intentional act.

== Faculties ==
The university is organized into faculties:

- Biology and Soil Science
- Chemistry and Chemical Technology
- Law
- Physics and Engineering
- History and Philosophy
- Journalism and Communication Sciences
- Philology
- Mathematics and Informatics
- Psychology, Pedagogy, Sociology and Social Work
- International Relations, Political and Administrative Sciences
- Economic Sciences
- Institute of Physical Education and Sport

== Notable professors ==
- Valentin Belousov
- Israel Gohberg
- Evgeny Pokatilov
- Yury Perlin
- Nicolae Corlăteanu
- Mikhail Pavlov
- Nicolae Dimo
- Evgeny Alexandrovich Litvinov

== Notable alumni ==
- Valentina Bidrug-Lungu – gender studies scholar
- Natalia Gherman – Acting Prime Minister of Moldova
- Samuel Yeboah Mensah – African Academy of Sciences
- Tatiana Molcean – diplomat and Executive Secretary of the United Nations Economic Commission for Europe (UNECE)

== See also ==
- List of universities in Moldova
- Education in Moldova
