= Education in Moldova =

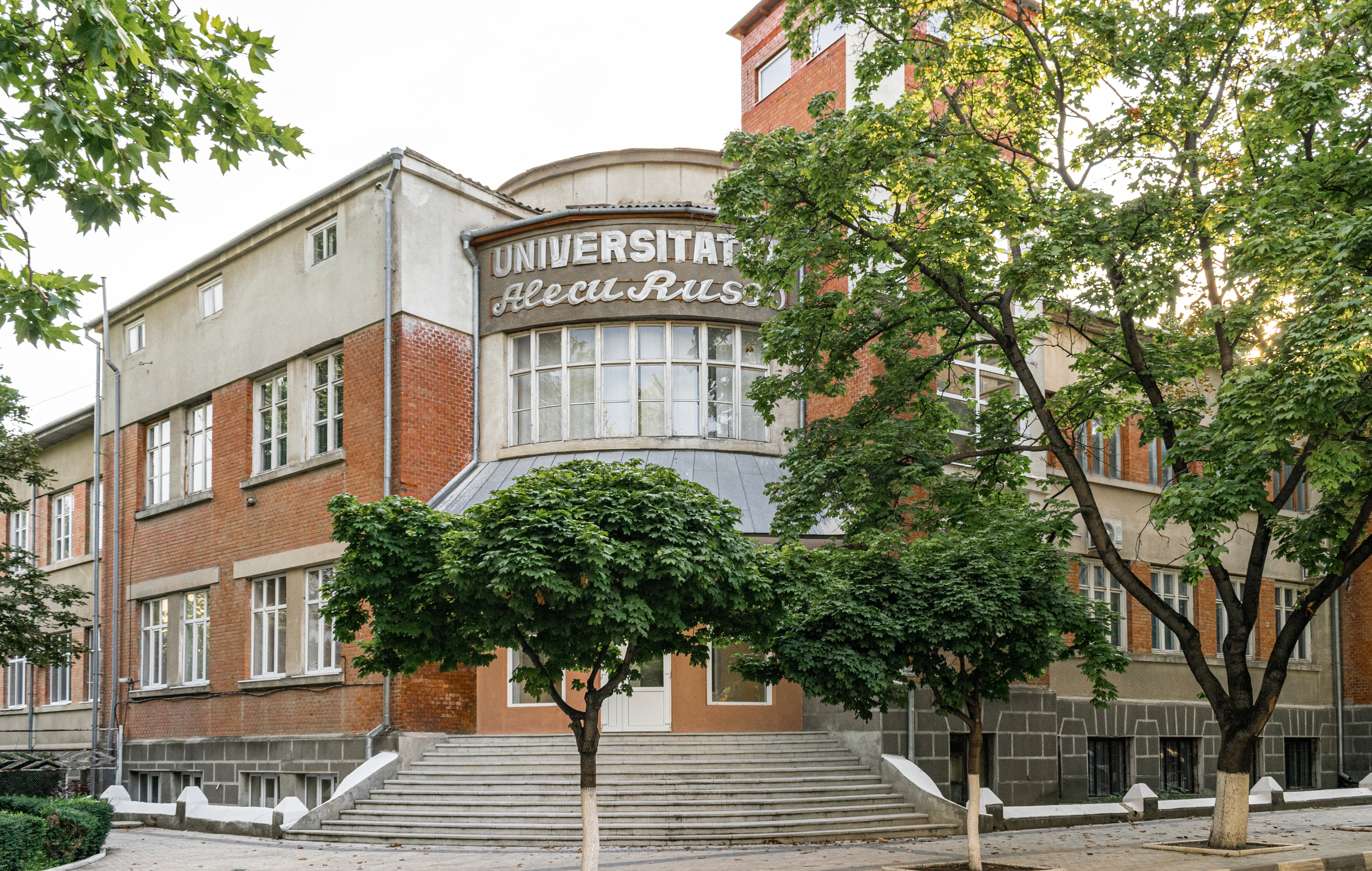
Alecu Russo State University of Bălți

Education in Moldova is currently the responsibility of the Ministry of Education and Research.

== History ==
In 1990, the average Moldovan spent six years in school, and only 30% of people older than 15 had completed secondary education. After the end of Soviet rule, reforms were established that required nationals to receive a basic education over 10 years, followed by enrollment in a technical school or an institution of higher learning.

== Primary and Secondary school education ==
As of 2007-2008 academic year, Moldova had ten types of primary and secondary schools:

- Kindergartens take kids from 3 to 5–6 years.
- Primary schools, grades 1-4
- Gymnasiums, grades 5-9
- Lyceums, grades 10-12, Bacalaureat exam
- General schools, grades 10-11, no Bacalaureat exam, cannot continue with higher education
- Evening Lyceums, grade 10-13, Bacalaureat exam
- Schools of trades, 1 year (grade 12), no Bacalaureat exam, cannot continue with higher education
- Vocational schools, 3 years (grades 10-12), no Bacalaureat exam, but can continue with higher education
- Vocational lyceums, 3 years (grades 10-12), Bacalaureat exam
- Colleges (Colegii), 3 to 4 years, Bacalaureat exam optional, but can continue with higher education
- Special schools, grades 1-11, no Bacalaureat exam, cannot continue with higher education

=== Grading conventions ===
The lowest grade (mark) in the Moldovan educational system is 1, the highest is 10. To pass a course, a subject, or an exam, the student must obtain a mark of 5 or above.

== Higher education ==
In Moldova, there are 19 state and 12 private institutions of higher education, with a total of 81,669 students in 2015-16.

There are 6,200 faculty members in Moldova's universities, institutes and academies (on average 1 faculty member per 20.3 students). Out of these, only 2,700 (43%) hold PhD degrees, including 358 (5.8%) that also hold the highest academic degree: Habilitation. Moldovan faculty members usually teach around 20 hours per week (one of the highest workloads in the world).

52.5% of students major in economics, law, social sciences, or in some fields that the Moldovan Ministry of Education calls on its website "professional formation fields", 18.4% study engineering and architecture, 16.0% - education. There are a total of 90 specialities (majors) offered.

101,100 students, or 80.2%, pay for their studies (from 2,000 to 7,300 Moldovan lei per year, i.e. from 120 to 430 euros per year). The state is trying to increase the number of places offered free of charge when students are admitted to public universities: there were 5,085 in 2001, 5,290 in 2002, 5,628 in 2003, 6,354 in 2004, 7,048 in 2005, 7,835 in 2006, but this rate (54% over 5 years) is lower than the rate of increase (65% over the same period) in the total number of places. 15% of the free of charge places are reserved, and distributed to candidates from low-income families. In an effort to support them, the state gives scholarships to 70% of students who occupy the free of charge places, i.e. to 14.4% of the total number of students. As of January 1, 2006, these scholarships are in three categories: 210, 230, or 270 Moldovan lei per month, i.e. 12, 14, or 16 euros per month respectively.

78.4% of students study in Romanian, roughly corresponding to its respective linguistic group, while 19.5% study in Russian (including members of other linguistic groups like Gagauz or Bulgarian). Foreign languages became increasingly less popular in recent years: 1.8% studied in English or French during the 2010-2011 schoolyear, compared to 3.2% in 2006.

The National Council on Accreditation and Attestation is an organization that approves the examination programs for doctoral students, confers scientific degrees, and scientific and pedagogical ranks. The Council publishes online all PhD theses that are elaborated and defended in Moldova.

=== The curriculum ===
At present, the graduates get two types of diplomas: one type for fulfilling the curriculum and the Licence examination, and a second type, if in addition they write a Licence Diploma paper.

The Ministry of Education defines its strategic objective for higher education to be "the integration into the European common space for higher education, and active participation in its construction". In 2005 Moldova signed the commitment to implement the Bologna process agreements. In view of this, several changes have been operated since:

- reorganization from September 1, 2005 of the higher education into an undergraduate cycle of 3–4 years, and a master cycle of 1-2 year
- commitment to copy European laws and adopt them wholesale
- elaboration and implementation of a Framework Plan for the first cycle (undergraduate)
- elaboration of a new Classification List of Specialities for the undergraduate cycle
- elaboration of an Implementation Guide for a to be National System of Transferable Credits, and institutionalization of this system in all universities and colleges
- implementation of the introduction of an educational record from in a unique European format, as a supplement to the Licence diploma

The Ministry of Education's declared objectives in taking these actions are:

- improvement of the quality of the country's higher education
- increasing the national and international mobility of students and faculty
- taking and implementing "European university education values" into the educational system of Moldova

The quality of the higher education has been declared a priority. In this context, a prime priority is declared to the implementation of the National Framework of Qualifications for Professional Formation, which will determine the "educational finalities and competences", the "compulsory minimum of realization in higher education", and will somehow facilitate the rise in "the quality of the preparation of graduates for the national economy", and will also somehow contribute to "ensuring the continuous rise of the quality of education".

Universities and colleges are told to start creating own "systems of internal management of quality", with the aim of "organizing the internal process of ensuring the quality, in accordance with national standards, and the demands of external evaluation systems".
