= Octeabriscoe =

Octeabriscoe may refer to several places in Moldova:

- Octeabriscoe, a village in Moşana Commune, Donduşeni district
- Octeabriscoe, a village in Văscăuţi Commune, Floreşti district
- Octeabriscoe, a village in Ţambula Commune, Sîngerei district
