= Loretta Handrabura =

Moldovan philologist, university lecturer, ethnologist and politician

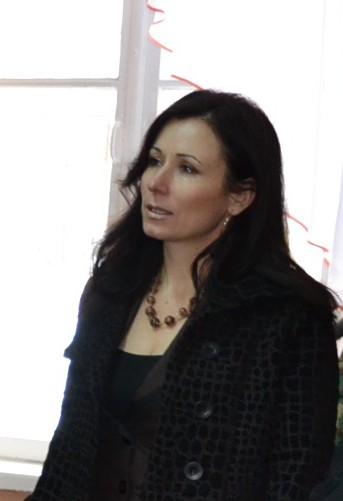
- Handrabura in 2012

Minister of Youth and Sport
- In office 30 July 2015 – 20 January 2016
- President: Nicolae Timofti
- Prime Minister: Valeriu Streleț; Gheorghe Brega (acting)
- Preceded by: Serghei Afanasenco
- Succeeded by: Victor Zubcu

Deputy Minister of Education
- In office 20 November 2009 – 30 July 2015
- President: Mihai Ghimpu (acting); Vladimir Filat (acting); Marian Lupu (acting); Nicolae Timofti
- Prime Minister: Vladimir Filat; Iurie Leancă; Chiril Gaburici; Natalia Gherman (acting)
- Minister: Leonid Bujor; Mihail Șleahtițchi; Maia Sandu

Member of the Chișinău Municipal Council
- In office 22 June 2007 – 20 November 2009

Personal details
- Born: 23 February 1970 (age 56) Baraboi, Moldavian SSR, Soviet Union
- Party: Liberal Democratic Party of Moldova (2009–present)
- Education: Ion Creangă Pedagogical State University; Alexandru Ioan Cuza University
- Occupation: Philolog, ethnolog

Loretta Handrabura (born 23 February 1970) is a Moldovan philologist holding a PhD in philology, university lecturer, ethnologist and politician, who served as Minister of Youth and Sports of Moldova between 30 July 2015 and 20 January 2016, and prior to this, as Deputy Prime Minister of Education of Moldova from 20 November 2009 until July 2015.

== Biography ==
She was born in a family of farmers and her mother chose the name Loretta, which was not in the nomenclature list, so in the documents her name was put down as Larisa. She grew up in Baraboi village, Dondușeni, where she attended the general school; afterwards, she wanted to follow her dream to become a folk song singer, but was rejected from Ștefan Neaga Musical College.

In 1992, she graduated from the Faculty of Philology of the Ion Creangă State Pedagogical University of Chișinău, with a degree in Language and Literature. From 1994 to 1998, she did PhD studies at Alexandru Ioan Cuza University of Iași. She defended her PhD theses on folklore in 2000.

Since 1992, she was an assistant at the Ion Creangă State Pedagogical University, and since 2003, she has been an associate professor in the Romanian and Comparative Literature Department.

She was included in the Dictionary of Romanian Ethnologists by Iordan Datcu in 2001.

Since 2002, she has collaborated with the Educational Center Pro Didactica as a trainer and expert; while in that position, she formed her visions on gender equality. In 2007, she worked at UNIFEM as an expert on the National Strategy on Gender Equality and in 2008, she was appointed as an expert on gender and media issues in the Council of Europe from the Republic of Moldova.

== Political activity ==
In 1992, she started her political career, becoming a member of the Social Democratic Party, where she held the presidency of the women's organization, but also she was the vice president for social affairs. In 2007, she was elected from the lists of this party in the Chișinău Municipal Council.

In 2009, she left the Social Democratic Party and became a member of the Liberal Democratic Party of Moldova.

On 20 November 2009 she was appointed as a Deputy Minister of Education of the Republic of Moldova and held this position until 30 July 2015, when she was appointed the Minister of Youth and Sports of the Republic of Moldova in the Streleț Cabinet.

== Honors and awards ==
On 24 July 2014 she was awarded, by the President of the Republic of Moldova Nicolae Timofti, the "Civic Merit" Medal "for significant contributions in accomplishment by Moldova of the major foreign policy objective – political association and economic integration with the European Union".

On 29 July 2014 Loretta Handrabura sent a letter to President Nicolae Timofti announcing that she was giving up the honor by asking to be excluded from the list and saying that she "prefers to remain with the experience gained as negotiator of the Moldova-EU Association Agreement".

== Works published ==
She has published a monograph, a manual, five studies, four teaching aids, five microstudies, seven analytical programs and around one hundred articles (fifty-six scientific).

- Artur Gorovei: monographic study, Elan Poligraf Publishing House, Chișinău, 2007
- Gender and Mass Media – Study, Partnership for Development Center, Chișinău, 2007
- Education for gender equity and equal opportunities, Pro Didactica Library, Chișinău, 2007, in collaboration with Viorica Goraş-Postica
- Exceeding the difficulties of reading and writing, Pro Didactica Library, Chișinău, 2007, in collaboration with Tatiana Cartaleanu, Viorica Goraş-Postica
