= Grinăuți =

Grinăuţi may refer to several places in Moldova:

- Grinăuţi, Rîşcani, a commune in Rîşcani district
- Grinăuţi, a village in Dîngeni Commune, Ocniţa district
- Grinăuţi, a village in Mihălăşeni, Ocniţa Commune, Ocniţa district
- Grinăuţi-Moldova, a commune in Ocniţa district, and its village of Grinăuţi-Raia
