= Jewish cemetery of Briceni =

Cemetery in Moldova

Coordinates: 48°21′33″N 27°06′25″E

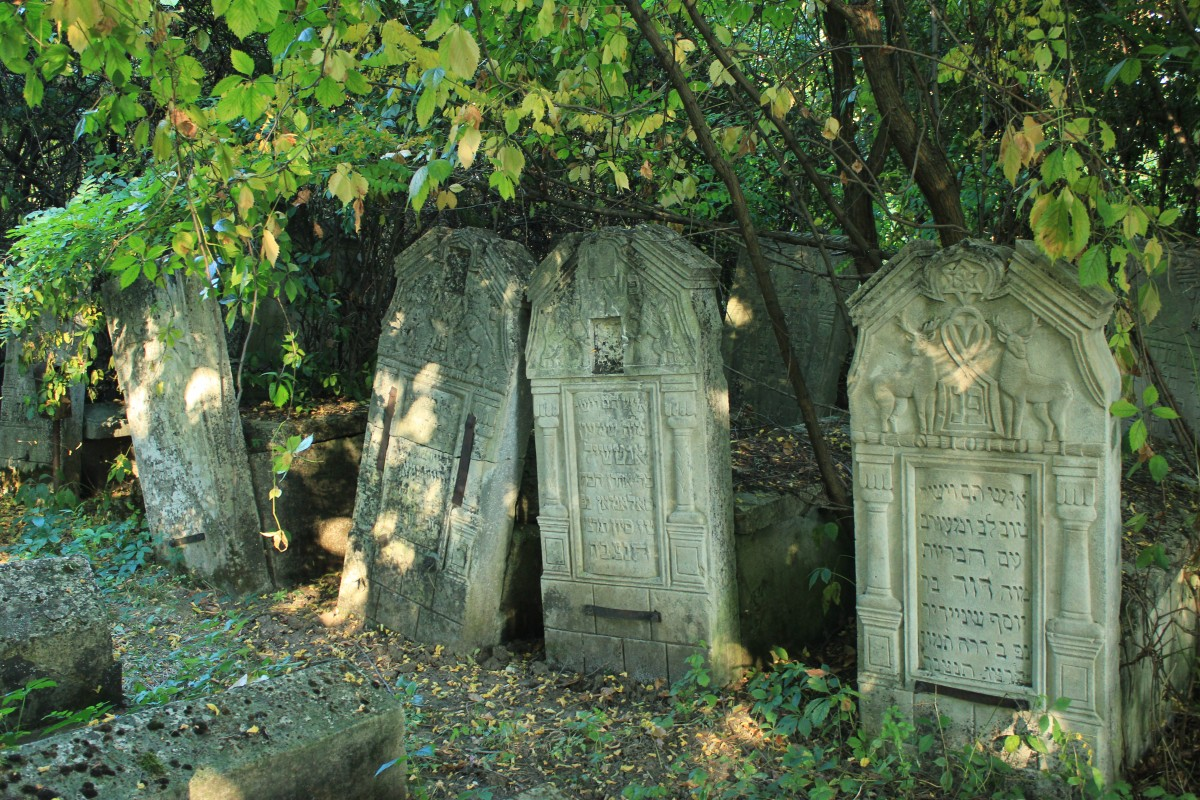
Tomb stones at the older part of Briceni cemetery

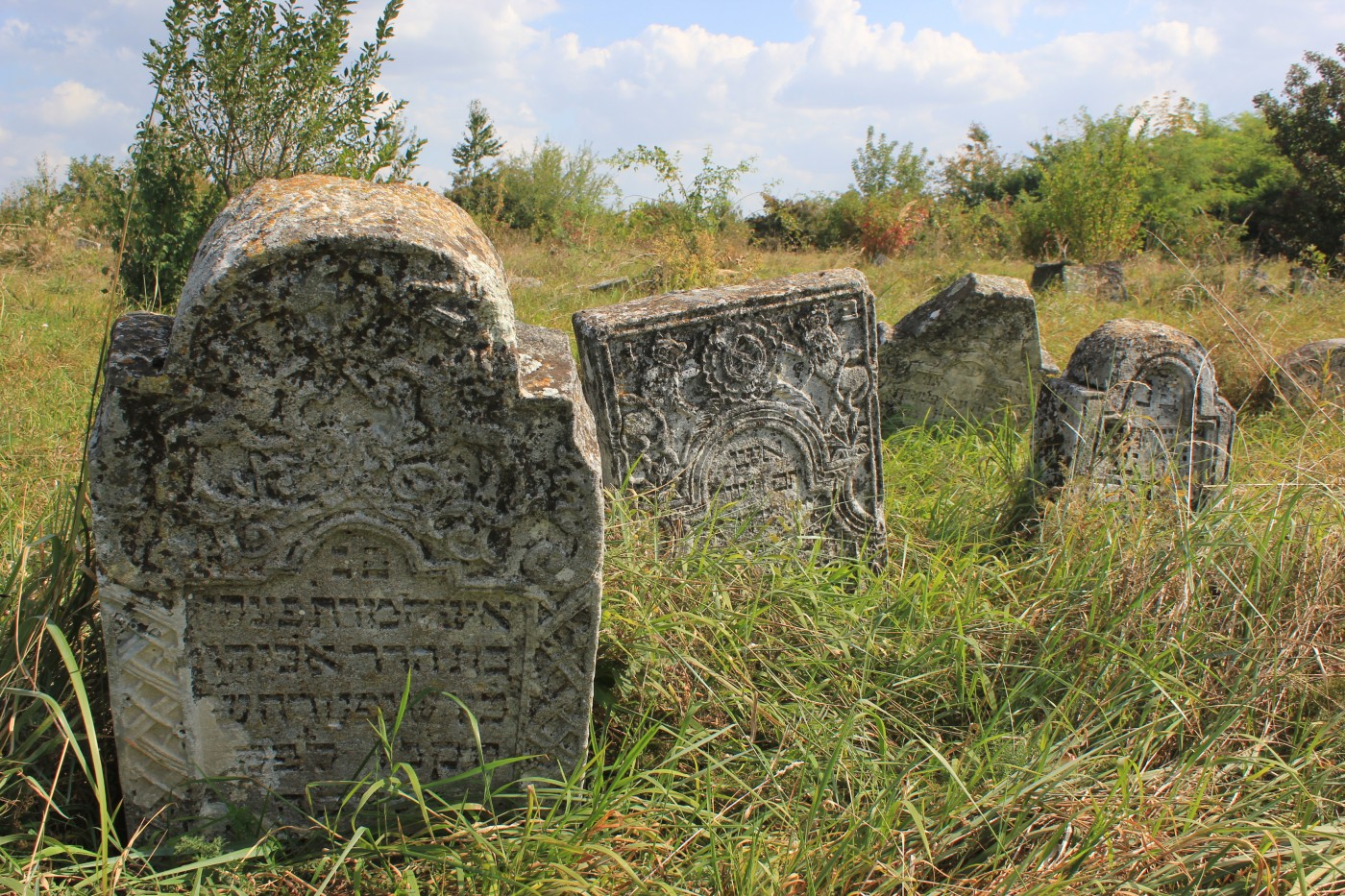
Tomb stones at the older part of Briceni cemetery

The Jewish cemetery of Briceni is located in the eastern vicinities of Briceni in northern Moldova, near the Ukrainian border. It is situated north of road R11, which leads to Ocnița.

The cemetery lies on flat land, surrounded by a broken wall with no gate. Spread over an area of 10,000 sq. m, it contains over 5000 tombstones.

The oldest burial dates back to 1745. There are 10 burials from the 18th century and many hundreds from the 19th century.

The older part with graves from the 19th and early 20th centuries up until World War II is heavily overgrown and many graves are damaged by vegetation, while most of the tombstones themselves are in a more or less good condition. At the newer part are graves from after 1945 to be found, when a small part of the town's Jewish population returned to Briceni.
