= Candle of Gratitude =

- Lumânarea Recunoștinței
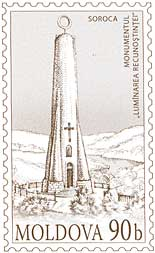
- Interactive map of Candle of Gratitude
- Coordinates: 48°8′13″N 28°18′17″E
- Height: 29.5 metres (97 ft)
- Opening date: March 27, 2004

The Candle of Gratitude (Romanian: Lumânarea Recunoștinței), also called the Thanksgiving Candle, is a monument and chapel in Soroca, Moldova.

== Overview ==
The monument was initiated by Ion Druță. The monument, which is some 29.5 metres (97 ft) tall, symbolizes a candle and is called "Lumânarea Recunoștinței" or "monumentul lui Badea Mior". It represents a tribute to the anonymous heroes who have preserved the culture, language and history of Moldova. The light of the candle can be seen at night from Otaci to the north and Camenca to the south.

The monument was opened on March 27, 2004, 86 years after the 1918 union of Bessarabia with Romania.

The ashes of Ion Druță were buried by the monument.
