= Caraiman =

Caraiman may refer to several places in Romania:

- Caraiman Peak, in the Bucegi Mountains
- Caraiman, a village in Mihălășeni Commune, Botoșani County
- Caraiman, a village in Brabova Commune, Dolj County

and to:

- Caraiman, a village in Frasin Commune, Dondușeni district, Moldova
