= Făgădău =

Făgădău may refer to several places in Moldova:

- Făgădău, a village in Ciolacu Nou Commune, Făleşti district
- Făgădău, a village in Văscăuţi Commune, Floreşti district
