= Mihail Dolgan =

- Born: 10 April 1939; Rediul Mare
- Died: 2 May 2013 (aged 75); Iași
- Education: Moldova State University
- Occupation: Professor
- Awards: Moldovan Writers' Union Diploma

Mihail Dolgan (5 February 1939 – 2 May 2013) was a professor and researcher from Moldova, member of the Academy of Sciences of Moldova.

== Overview ==
His speciality is the Romanian contemporary literature and he is a member of the "Department of Social Sciences and Humanities" of the Academy of Sciences of Moldova. Mihail Dolgan is the author of at least 50 books and more than 900 studies, articles, and literal chronics. His interests are focused on the fundamental themes and problems, as well as on integration, revaluation, of the postwar literature from the Republic of Moldova and Romania.

== Awards ==
- Medal „M. Eminescu”
- Medal Academy of Sciences of Moldova „D. Cantemir”.
- Academy of Sciences of Moldova Prize
- Diploma of Gratitude of the Academy of Sciences of Moldova
- Moldovan Writers' Union Diploma

== Works ==
- Metafora poetică şi semnificaţia ei în poezia moldovenească (1974);
- Conştiinţa civică a poeziei contemporane (1976);
- Poezia: adevăr artistic şi angajare socială (1988);
- Grigore Vieru, adevăratul (2003); tratatele colective (con¬cepţie şi întocmire, coordonator şi coautor de bază, redactor ştiinţific responsabil) Istoria literaturii moldoveneşti (vol. III, partea I, 1988);
- Literatura română postbelică. Integrări, valorificări, recon¬siderări (1988);
- Orientări artistice şi stilistice în literatura contemporană (în 2 vol., 2003);
- Opera lui Ion Druţă: univers artistic, spi¬ritual, filosofic (în 2 vol., 2004); culegerile de articole: Crez şi măiestrie artistică (1982);
- Responsabilitatea cuvîntului critic (1987);
- Polemici literare sau pledoarii întru apărarea poeziei autentice (2005);
- Literatura moldove¬nească, clasa a X-a (coautor, ediţiile din anii 1966–1988);
- Literatura moldovenească pentru copii (1983, coautor, coordonator, alcătuitor, redactor responsabil).
