= Dondușeni District =

Coordinates: 48°20′N 27°40′E

Dondușeni
- District (Raion)
- Flag

- Country: Republic of Moldova
- Administrative center (Oraş-reşedinţă): Dondușeni
- Established: 2002

Government
  - Raion President: Valentin Cebotari (2023) (PSRM)

Area
  - Total: 644.1 km^{2} (248.7 sq mi)
- Elevation: 247 m (810 ft)

Population (2024)
  - Total: 28,108
  - Density: 43.64/km^{2} (113.0/sq mi)
- Time zone: UTC+2 (EET)
  - Summer (DST): UTC+3 (EEST)
- Area code: +373 51
- Car plates: DN

Dondușeni District (Romanian pronunciation: [donduˈʃenʲ]) is a district (raion) in the north of Moldova. Its administrative center is the city of Dondușeni. As of the 2024 Moldovan census, its population was 28,108.

== History ==
The earliest attestations of historical towns were in 1437, when the district was certified Teleșeuca village. Other localities, Arionești, Corbu, Crișcăuți, Horodiște and Tîrnova were documented between 1463–1470. In the following centuries, district towns were developed both socially and culturally. In 1812, the Treaty of Bucharest, Bessarabia was occupied by the Russian Empire as a district for more than 100 years (1812–1918) until the Russian administration fell. In the spring of 1888, the construction of Bălți–Ocnița railway started, and ended in 1893. The railway history is closely linked to the city of Dondușeni, during the years 1902–1905; the building near the railway station, built in 1892, held the construction of a pumping station and a water tower, two warehouses for grain and a ramp load, two kilometers of road and three houses. 1918 registered a new page in the history of Bessarabia. On 27 March, Sfatul Țării of Bessarabia voted for the Union of Bessarabia with Romania.

Following the pact between Hitler and Stalin on 26 June 1940, the fate of Bessarabia was determined by military force. 22 June 1941 marked the start of 1418 days and nights of fierce and bloody fights between the Germans and the Soviets. During this period, more than half the male population was mobilized to Donduşeni station and sent into the searing flames of war. From 1946–1947, the district endured hunger caused by the communist regime. In 2004, the district population was 47,400.

== Geography ==
Donduşeni district is located in the north-eastern part of Moldova, with neighboring districts- Ocnița District in the north, Edineţ District in the west, Rîșcani District in the south, Drochia and Soroca in the southeast. Also, it has a border with Ukraine in the northeast. Chernozems occupy 80% of the district. Maximum altitude in the district is located near the village Pocrovca, reaching heights of 247 m.

=== Climate ===
Donduşeni district has a temperate continental climate with an annual average temperature of 10 °C (50 °F) in July mean temperature is 20 °C (68 °F), while in January, 4 °C (39 °F). Yearly precipitation is 450–600 mm. Wind speed is an average speed of 2–5 m/s.

=== Fauna ===
The fauna of the district is typical European, with a greater presence of foxes, hedgehogs, badger, wild boar, ferret rarely deer, raccoon dog and spotted deer. Of birds: storks, crows, tits, cop, starlings, swallows and others.

=== Flora ===
Forests occupy 7.7% of the district territory and are made up of common oak, hornbeam, linden, maple, of plant: fescue, clover, burdock, wormwood, and many others.

=== Ţaul Park ===
The largest park in Moldova is located in the village of Ţaul, about 200 km north of Chişinău and 5 km from Donduşeni. The core and the focus of contemplation is the mansion, open park boundaries and not only vision but also the village due to its dominant position. To the left of the palace, the trees shade the lawn and flower gardens with a glade made out of built box-resorts, hosting house guests, kitchen and group destination buildings. The assembly of Taul village bore little change over time and remains a classical monument characterized by early 20th-century residences. The compositions of landscapes and found ideas which materialize planning landscape gardens, developed in Europe at the end of the 19th century, and many species of garden is a treasure arboretum.

=== Rivers ===
Located in the Nistru river basin district bordering the river only a small portion near the village Arioneşti. The main river crossing the district is Răut (286 km), which takes its origins from the confluence of two streams within 2 km east of the village Rediul Mare, at an altitude of 180 m, with tributaries Cubolta (103 km) and Cainari. Răut is the largest tributary of the Nistru. Most lakes are artificial origin.

== Administrative subdivisions ==
There are a total of 30 localities: 1 city, and 21 communes (containing further 8 villages within):

=== Cities ===
Donduşeni (population 10,700)

=== Communes ===
Arionești (pop. 1,596) Baraboi (pop. 3,354) Briceni (pop. 897) Cernoleuca (pop. 2,087) Climăuți (pop. 1,228) Corbu (pop. 1,619) Crișcăuți (pop. 1,348) Dondușeni (Dondoșani; pop. 1,695) Elizavetovca (Elisabeta; pop. 632) Boroseni Frasin (Frasân; pop. 2,090) Caraiman Codrenii Noi Horodiște (Horodiștea; pop. 1,075) Moşana (pop. 1,796) Octeabriscoe	Pivniceni (pop. 728) Plop (Plopi; pop. 1,472) Pocrovca (pop. 1,059) Rediul Mare (pop. 1,150) Scăieni (Scăienii de Sus; pop. 2,037) Sudarca (pop. 2,013) Braicău Teleșeuca (Teleșăuca Veche; pop. 828) Teleșeuca Nouă (Teleșăuca Nouă) Tîrnova (pop. 4,606) Briceva Elenovca (Elena-Doamnă) Țaul (pop. 3,331)

== Demographics ==
In the 2024 Census, the district population was 28,108 of which 21.3% urban and 78.7% rural population.

=== Ethnic groups ===
Ethnic group	% of total
Moldovans *	81.1
Ukrainians	8.3
Russians	5.2
Romanians *	4.7
Romani	0.4
Gagauz	0.1
Bulgarians	0.1
Other	0.2
Undeclared	0.0

Footnote: * There is an ongoing controversy regarding the ethnic identification of Moldovans and Romanians.

=== Religion ===
- Christian – 99.2%
  - Orthodox Christian – 93.1%
  - Old Believers – 3.3%
  - Protestant – 2.8%
- Other – 0.1%
- No Religion – 0.3%
- Not declared - 0.3%

== Economy ==
As of 2009, 18,311 businesses were registered in the district. Most of these were private (individual) farms. 532 km^{2}. of the district's 645 km^{2} (249 sq mi) area is agricultural land, including 333.23 km^{2} (128.66 sq mi) of arable land, and 38.88 km^{2} (15.01 sq mi) of orchards. Main crops are cereals cultivation in the district: wheat and barley, maize, sugar beet, sunflower, rapeseed, and soy.

== Education ==
As of 2009, there were 21 kindergartens in the district. There were 7 lyceums (grades 1–12), 3 secondary schools (grades 1–11), 15 gymnasiums (grades 1–9), 1 primary school (grades 1–4), one or more professional schools (grades 12–13), and one or more boarding schools for orphans.

== Politics ==
Located in the so-called North Red, region where PCRM which usually has good results obtained from 2001 until now over 50% of the vote. But the last three elections the Communists are in constant decline. District is one of the founding members of Euroregion Dniester.

During the last three elections AEI had an increase of 109.6%

Parliament elections results
Year	AEI	PCRM
2010	39.39% 8,319	54.00% 11,405
July 2009	33.72% 7,146	58.94% 12,495
April 2009	19.05% 3,969	64.65% 13,467

=== Elections ===
Summary of 28 November 2010 Parliament of Moldova election results in Donduşeni District
Parties and coalitions	Votes	%	+/−
Party of Communists of the Republic of Moldova	11,405	54.00	−4.94
Liberal Democratic Party of Moldova	4,137	19.59	+9.51
Democratic Party of Moldova	3,022	14,31	+0.15
Liberal Party	900	4.26	−1.31
European Action Movement	268	1.27	+1.27
Party Alliance Our Moldova	260	1.23	−2.68
Christian Democratic People's Party	258	1.22	−2.50
Other Party	877	4.12	+0.50
Total (turnout 65.34%)	21,288	100.00	

== Culture ==
There are 23 public libraries, 22 culture halls, and 1 museum in Donduşeni district. There are also 87 art groups. In recent years, several houses were repaired by culture, or open more libraries, especially in villages. Village libraries are equipped with books in large numbers.

== Health ==
There is a hospital with 135 beds, and an outpatient health center with 10 branches, and 10 physician offices. All villages of the district were reading a medical point of 5–6 physicians in the environment.

== Personalities ==
- Alexander Gelman – Basarabian playwright, writer, and screenwriter.
- Arcadie Gherasim – Journalist (Vocea Basarabiei)
- Boris Trakhtenbrot – Israeli and Russian mathematician in mathematical logic, algorithms, theory of computation and cybernetics
- Constantin Stere – Politician, lawyer, scholar and writer
- Gary Bertini – Israeli conductor
- Ion Druta – Poet, Member of the Academy of Sciences of Moldova
- Mihai Grecu – Artist, one of the most appreciated in his time by critics and the public
- Mihail Șleahtițchi – Minister of Education of Moldova, of 2010
- Dorin Recean – Prime minister of Moldova
- Vladimir Grigore Țurcan a.n.1946, satul Cernoleuca, colonel, veteran de război, ofițer emerit SIS, șeful spionajului extern al Republicii Moldova.
