= Baraboi =

Baraboi is a name of several geographic features in the Eastern Europe Black Sea region.

== Bodies of water ==
- Baraboi River (disambiguation)
- Baraboi Reservoir

== Populated places ==
- Baraboi, Donduşeni, a commune in Donduşeni district, Moldova
- Baraboi, Odesa Oblast, a village in Odesa Raion, Odesa Oblast, Ukraine
