= Plop, Dondușeni =

Plop
- Village
- Location within Moldova
- Coordinates: 48.2552777778°N 27.7002777778°E
- Country: Moldova
- District: Dondușeni District

Government
  - Mayor: Aureliu Guțanu (PDM)

Population (2014 census)
  - Total: 1,353
- Time zone: UTC+2 (EET)
  - Summer (DST): UTC+3 (EEST)

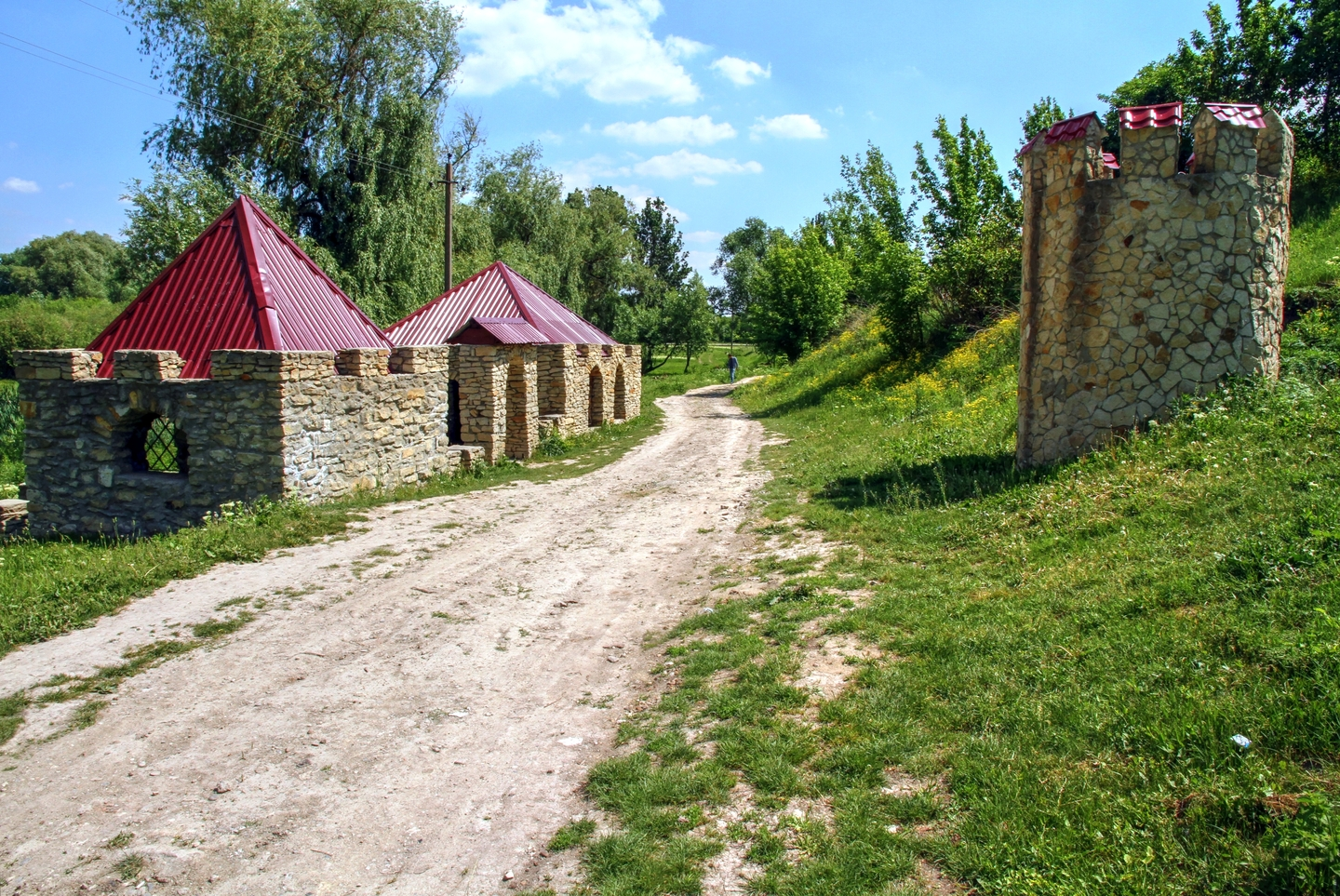
Plop, Dondiuseni

Plop is a village in Dondușeni District, Moldova.
