= Constantin Stere =

Romanian writer, jurist and politician (1865–1936)

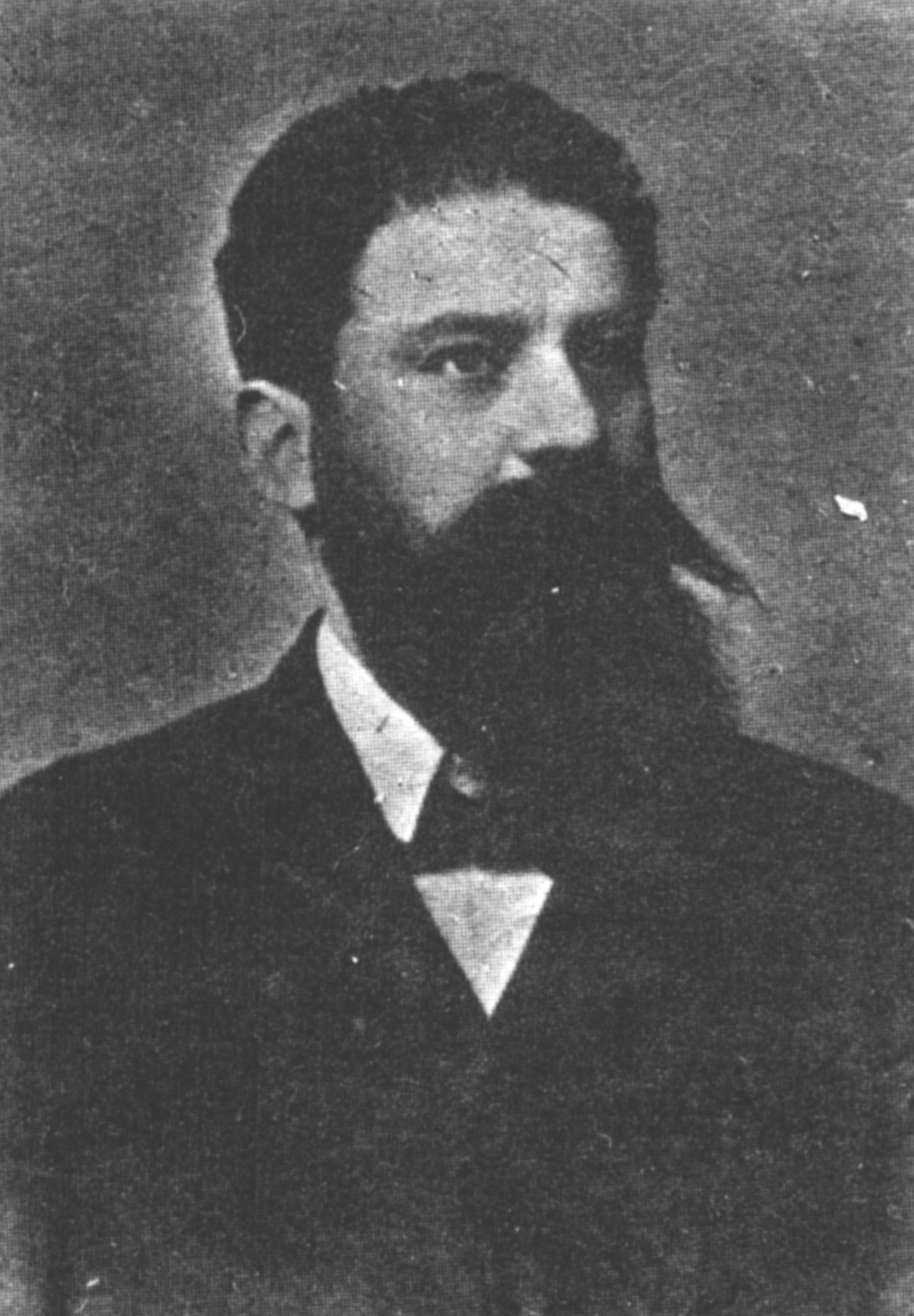
- Stere in 1895

Personal details
- Born: June 1, 1865 Horodiște, Bessarabia, Russian Empire (now Moldova)
- Died: June 26, 1936 (aged 71) Bucharest, Romania
- Party: Narodnaya Volya; Social Democratic Workers' Party of Romania; National Liberal Party; Peasants' Party; National Peasants' Party; Democratic Peasants' Party–Stere
- Occupation: jurist

Constantin G. Stere or Constantin Sterea (Romanian; Russian: Константин Егорович Стере, Konstantin Yegorovich Stere or Константин Георгиевич Стере, Konstantin Georgiyevich Stere; also known under his pen name Șărcăleanu; June 1, 1865 – June 26, 1936) was a Romanian writer, jurist, politician, ideologue of the Poporanist trend, and, in March 1906, co-founder (together with Garabet Ibrăileanu and Paul Bujor — the latter was afterwards replaced by the physician Ioan Cantacuzino) of the literary magazine Viața Românească. One of the central figures of the Bessarabian intelligentsia at the time, Stere was a key actor during the Union of Bessarabia with Romania in 1918, and is associated with its legacy.

Constantin Stere was professor of Administrative and Constitutional law at the University of Iaşi, serving as its rector between 1913 and 1916. He is also remembered for his partly autobiographical novel În preajma revoluției (literal translation: "On the Eve of the Revolution" — in reference to the Russian Revolution of 1917).

== Biography ==
=== Early life ===
He was born in Horodiște, Soroca County, to a family of boyar origins from Ciripcău, Bessarabia — which was part of the Russian Empire at the time. Stere was one of the three sons of a couple of Russian citizens: Gheorghe or Iorgu Stere (known as Yegor Stepanovich Stere, Егор Степанович Стере in Russian), an ethnic Greek landowner whose family was originally from Botoșani County in the Romanian part of Moldavia, and Pulcheria (Пулкерия), a member of the impoverished gentry in Bessarabia. He spent most of his early years, until the age of eight, in Ciripcău, where the family manor was located.

Around 1874, he graduated from a Chișinău private school where classes were taught German, and entered the school for dvoryane in the city, where he became close friends with Alexandru Grosu and Lev Matveyevich Kogan-Bernstein (who were the basis for the characters Sașa Lungu and Moise Roitman in Stere's novel). It was also around this time that he became acquainted with progressive, utopian socialist, and Darwinist ideas (notably reading the works of Nikolai Chernyshevsky, Alexander Herzen, Charles Darwin, Karl Marx, Mikhail Bakunin, Ferdinand Lassalle, and Peter Lavrovich Lavrov). Stere later indicated that, before the late 1870s, he could not spell the Romanian alphabet, which had just been adopted over the border (see Romanian Cyrillic alphabet), and had to rely on a few books smuggled into Bessarabia for getting a sense of literary Romanian.

While still students, Stere and Kogan-Bernstein engaged in revolutionary politics as socialists and Narodniks, initiating a conspirative "self-instruction" cell of six inside their school. The group was affiliated with Narodnaya Volya, and Stere was responsible for multiplying and distributing locally the manifesto issued by the latter after it had assassinated Emperor Alexander II. This was also the first moment when Stere declared his opposition to a Social democratic program, a Narodnik-inspired objection which would later form one of the tenets of his doctrine.

He was first arrested in late 1883, after Okhrana units decapitated the Bessarabian wing of the Narodnaya Volya. Detained in Odessa (during which time he read intensely), Stere was frequently visited by Maria Grosu, the sister of Alexandru, who had fallen in love with him — a Narodnik and a feminist, she asked Stere for a marriage of convenience that was meant to help her become free from parental tutelage (according to the laws of the Russian Empire, unmarried women were under their father's protection). Stere agreed, and they were married in the prison chapel (1885).

=== Siberia ===
In 1885, he was deported to Siberia, serving a three-year term. Briefly kept in Tyumen prison awaiting transport further east, he was sent to Kurgan in the custody of two gendarmes (October). He was joined there by Maria, who gave birth to their son Roman in 1886. Moving to Turinsk, the Steres joined a group of revolutionaries in internal exile; Constantin Stere agreed to print copies of a Narodnik magazine, using a hectograph, and was exposed during a raid by authorities. He was swiftly taken to Tobolsk, then shipped down the Irtysh to the place where it met the Ob; he traveled to the village of Sharkala (the northernmost part of Siberia he ever reached) in a Khanty canoe, and was then settled in Beryozovsky District, only to be arrested again and sent back to Tobolsk in the autumn of 1888.

He was tried for his activities in Turinsk, based on evidence collected by the Okhrana. While in prison, Stere, who was beginning to distance himself from socialism and proletarian internationalism, argued in front of authorities that mention of his change in attitude was supposed to be kept by the court when passing the verdict. At the time, a physician who examined him noted that he had suffered a nervous breakdown, and had him moved to a prison hospital. According to most accounts, he had attempted suicide (a gesture caused by either the death of one of his brothers, who had himself committed suicide, or by news that the Narodnik leader Lev Tikhomirov had become a supporter of the political establishment). In hospital, Stere stated that:

"Quite a while ago have I begun to remove myself from the influence of political exiles and their tradition. Recent times, filled with major hardships for me, I have decided firmly and sincerely to break with these traditions, as well as with all things «illegal» in my past."

Instead, he became familiar with neo-Kantian philosophy, expanding on his interest in Immanuel Kant's Critique of Pure Reason (which he was reading in Beryozovsky District). It was at this time that Stere began writing.

In March 1889, the court decided to extend his term of exile by three more years, and relocated him to the village of Serginsk, near Minusinsk. He much later claimed that, while passing through the prison of Krasnoyarsk, he met Vladimir Lenin, the future Bolshevik leader — this is unlikely, as Lenin passed through the city several years after Stere. His other claim to have met and befriended Józef Piłsudski, future head of state of Poland (and, at the time, a prominent member of the Polish Socialist Party), was confirmed by Piłsudski himself in 1927 (Stere's novel, În preajma revoluției, included Piłsudski as a character, under the name Stadnicki).

=== Datoria and Evenimentul ===
In late 1891 or early 1892, having been set free, Stere returned to Bessarabia, and eventually sought political refuge inside Romania, crossing the border clandestinely. He studied law at the University of Iași (under Petre Missir, while carrying on as a leftist activist and quickly becoming an influential figure among the youth of Iași, the inspiration behind a left-leaning student society that engaged in a virulent polemic with the nationalist youth, and an acquaintance of socialist leaders such as Constantin Dobrogeanu-Gherea, Garabet Ibrăileanu, Ioan Nădejde, Sofia Nădejde, Constantin Mille, Theodor Speranția, Vasile Morțun, and Nicolae L. Lupu. Later, a controversy erupted over Stere's academic credentials, as it was never consistently proven that he had passed his baccalaureate between being arrested and applying for law school.

Stere's break with Marxism led him to attempt persuading the newly created Romanian Social Democratic Workers' Party (PSDMR) to amend its proletariat-focused policies, and, in 1893, to found the student society Datoria ("The Duty"), which preserved the Narodnik focus on educating peasants. He and his followers nevertheless continued to rely much of their thesis on Marxist concepts, coupled with an interest taken in the reformist socialist way advocated by Eduard Bernstein.

After debuting as a journalist for the liberal-inspired Evenimentul in 1893 (and engaging in public debates with the socialist press), Stere also sent substantial contribution to Adevărul, a tribune of various left-wing trends that was being published in Bucharest under the direction of Anton Bacalbașa. Later in 1893, he took part in founding Evenimentul Literar, the literary supplement of Evenimentul.

He joined in the socialists Bacalbașa and Ibrăileanu in a cultural polemic with the poet Alexandru Vlahuță and his magazine Vieața. Vlahuță, who had sided with Dobrogeanu-Gherea during the latter's conflict with Bogdan Petriceicu Hasdeu, nonetheless clashed with the leftists over the issue of "art for art's sake", arguing that the interest his adversaries took in didacticism was harming literature. This exchange of replies soon involved the former socialist Eduard Dioghenide, who attacked Evenimentul Literar with Antisemitic language, contending that Stere was "an employee of the little kikes" and had "lost his soul to the Jews". At the time, Stere's activity with Datoria also came under attack from various student societies — most of them associates of the Conservative Party.

During the late 1890s, he had begun making use of the Șărcăleanu alias in his polemic articles, which became a particular topic of dispute after his confrontation with Dioghenide (who first speculated that Stere was the author of Șărcăleanu's articles). Dioghenide's supporters, editors of the newspaper Naționalul, consequently pressured Stere to indicate who Șărcăleanu was ("We wish to know him, does he wear sidelocks or is he a Judaisized Romanian?"). Similar calls were voiced by Vieața, who alleged that Stere himself was a Russian Jew.

Winning the support of several Conservative politicians, Stere successfully applied for Romanian citizenship in February 1895, obtaining naturalization through a special law, as "a Romanian from Bessarabia".

In 1897, Stere obtained a licensure with a thesis on legal entity and individualism, one which drew criticism from the influential Conservative-inspired group Junimea, on the assumption that it had been partly inspired by Marx. At the time, he also published an incomplete series of philosophical essays centered on the works of Wilhelm Wundt. After graduation, Stere, who was by then the father of four, lived for a while in Ploiești, and afterwards joined the Bar association in Iași as a practicing lawyer. During the period, he met and befriended the influential writer Ion Luca Caragiale.

=== Birth of Poporanism ===
By 1898, Stere, who had continued to acquire influence with Iași-based socialists, became involved in disputes over the future of the Romanian Social Democratic Workers' Party (PSDMR) and Vasile Morțun's call for a merger with the National Liberal Party (PNL) — Morțun's camp, which also included Alexandru G. Radovici, became known in time as "the generous ones" (generoșii). According to Constantin Titel Petrescu, Stere, despite his own polemics with Dobrogeanu-Gherea, sided with the latter and against Morțun ("Even Stere [...] declared himself against moving to the Liberals"). Nevertheless, during merger talks between the "generous ones" and the left wing of the National Liberals, Stere was approached by the latter's Ion I. C. Brătianu; Brătianu and Gheorghe Gh. Mârzescu, who were gathering supporters at a time when the PNL cabinet of Dimitrie Sturdza looked set to lose the general elections of 1899 to a strong coalition of Conservatives and former Liberals such as Petre S. Aurelian, proposed to Stere that he become a city councilor in Iași, and he accepted. During the period, he split with Evenimentul, as the paper became close to Liberal splinter groups and virulently criticized the contacts between the PNL and former PSDMR affiliates.

Eventually, Stere entered the PNL as a left-wing radical and populist, supporting an original tactic that blended a Narodnik focus on the peasantry with a weariness towards capitalism and industrialisation. This was the origin of Poporanism, a theory expanded upon in his influential 1908 essay Poporanism sau social-democrație?, "Poporanism or Social democracy?" (Stere coined the original term in 1894, viewing it the best translation of the word Narodnik).

In essence, Poporanism ceased to view socialism as a goal in countries such as Romania. Stere noted that the group to be defined as industrial proletariat accounted for ca. 1% of the total number of taxpayers (around 1907), and argued instead for a "peasant state", which was to encourage and preserve small agricultural plots as the basis for economic development. Citing the example of Denmark (see Danish cooperative movement), he also proposed that cooperative industries were to be created in the rural sphere, and that initiative agriculture could also rely in cooperative farms:

"The essential role of peasant cooperatives resides in that they, while keeping the small-scale peasant holdings intact, award them the possibility to make use of all the advantages of large-scale production."

Despite its name, Stere understood the "peasant state" not as an actual hegemony of the peasantry, but as an immediate move from the census suffrage in the Kingdom of Romania to a universal one, intended to accurately reflect the country's social realities (see 1866 Constitution of Romania). In an 1898 speech, he also stressed a loyalty for the King of Romania (Carol I at the time).

Stere notably rejected Karl Kautsky's support for capitalization in agriculture, arguing that it was neither necessary nor practical. He was not, however, opposed to modernization, and invested trust in the role of intellectuals as militants and activists, as well as building on Werner Sombart's theory that agrarian economies were facing new and special conditions (as opposed to those that bore the mark of the Industrial Revolution). Stere observed changes occurring in the developed world at the turn of the 19th century, and concluded that industrialization of backward countries was also being blocked by colonialism and the prosperity it had brought to the British Empire and the United States. He argued that a new form of capital was being created at a larger, non-national, scale; he deemed it "vagabond capital", and viewed in it the source for the lack of accuracy in Marxist predictions over proletarian alienation (as it appeared that, in developed countries, the proletariat was growing wealthier).

This was also the start of a polemic between him and the Marxist Constantin Dobrogeanu-Gherea. Although the two shared skepticism over the possibility of early socialist success in Romania (agreeing with Titu Maiorescu's verdict that it was one of the "forms without substance", and thus an ill-suited effect of Westernization), Dobrogeanu-Gherea argued that Stere's program of basing Romania's economy on cooperatives and small-scale agricultural holdings could only lead to endemic underdevelopment.

=== Early National Liberal politics ===
As a city councilor in 1899, Stere soon found himself in an unusual position after Minister of the Interior Mihail Pherekyde ordered a clampdown on the surviving PSDMR. This came after the Conservative opposition voiced allegations that socialist clubs in the countryside were inciting laborers to revolt (an accusation which threatened to decrease the popularity of the Dimitrie Sturdza cabinet). As all former PSDMR members in the PNL came under scrutiny, he was himself the target of attacks in Parliament, and notably criticized by the Constitutional Party's Titu Maiorescu for allegedly using his position to "disturb the elementary order; [...] leading to the only place it could lead: peasant rebellion".

He lost his position in March 1899, following Sturdza's fall from power over a scandal involving relations between Romanian and Austria-Hungary. Consequently, he welcomed the remaining "generous ones" inside the PNL as the PSDMR was dissolved (April 1899); those socialists who remained independent continued to consider Stere the main instigator of the move. At the time, he relied on what he interpreted as Ion I. C. Brătianu's promise that a PNL cabinet was going to enforce both universal suffrage and land reform, and hoped to exercise an influence on the party's Left. With Pherekyde, Petre Poni, Toma Stelian and Spiru Haret, Stere was soon involved in public protests against the successive Conservative cabinets of Gheorghe Grigore Cantacuzino and Petre P. Carp — provoked by the Hallier Affair — involving a French firm which used its government connections to regain a public works contract in the port of Constanța, although it had failed to respect its obligations —, and the "Law on spirits" (or "law on țuica") — which established homebrewing tax, engendering violence in the countryside.

Following a conflict between Cantacuzino and Carp, which caused the latter's cabinet to be invalidated with assistance from Conservative parliamentarians (February 1901) Sturdza returned to power triumphantly. In the 1901 suffrage, he was first elected to Chamber for the 3rd Electoral College in Iaşi. Stere largely owed his 1901 appointment as Deputy Professor at the University of Iași to his political connections: falling short of legal requirements, he asked Brătianu and Spiru Haret to make an exception in his case (in order to avoid breaking the law which prevented state employees from being elected deputies, he asked not to receive a salary for his first course). After he became a full Professor, his assistant at the department was Nicolae Daşcovici.

Stere sided with Brătianu and Vasile Lascăr in 1904, at a time when the two confronted Sturdza and resigned from their government offices, provoking the cabinet's fall (and Gheorghe Grigore Cantacuzino's reinstatement as Premier).

=== 1905 Russian Revolution ===
In his later years, Stere argued that he had foreseen Japan's victory in the Russo-Japanese War and the string of social problems Russia experienced, and that he had sent the General Staff of the Romanian Army a memorandum on the matter.

Soon after the Russian Revolution of 1905, Stere and a group of his followers returned to Bessarabia in order to encourage local Romanian sentiment during elections for the State Duma and zemstvos — according to Stere, the group had the tacit approval of the Conservative government. In parallel, Stere represented the Chișinău zemstvo as a lawyer in a civil lawsuit. They arrived at a time of conflict, when Black Hundreds activity was gaining momentum and peasant pressures in the countryside were meeting with resistance from reactionary politicians such as Vladimir Purishkevich and Pavel Krushevan. Initially, Stere doubled as a correspondent for PNL French language newspapers, signing them as C. Șercăleano.

He issued a magazine (Basarabia) of which he was editor (together with Ion Inculeț, Teodor Inculeț, Ion Pelivan, Alexei Mateevici, and Pan Halippa), attempting to profit from the political gains in Russia by calling for both in-depth social reforms and decentralization; their influence waned after reactionary politicians made electoral gains and, as the new administration, confiscated most of the magazine's issues (leading to its bankruptcy in 1907). Stere himself first returned to Romania in early 1906, and immediately left on a trip to Austro-Hungarian-ruled Transylvania, where he met with the poet and activist Octavian Goga in Sibiu, as well as with other prominent ethnic Romanians, becoming in time an unofficial envoy of the PNL in the region. His involvement in the zemstvo trial became the topic of a scandal, after the institution accused Stere of having failed to fulfill his obligations as a lawyer, and called on him to return the fees he had received.

=== Viața Românească ===
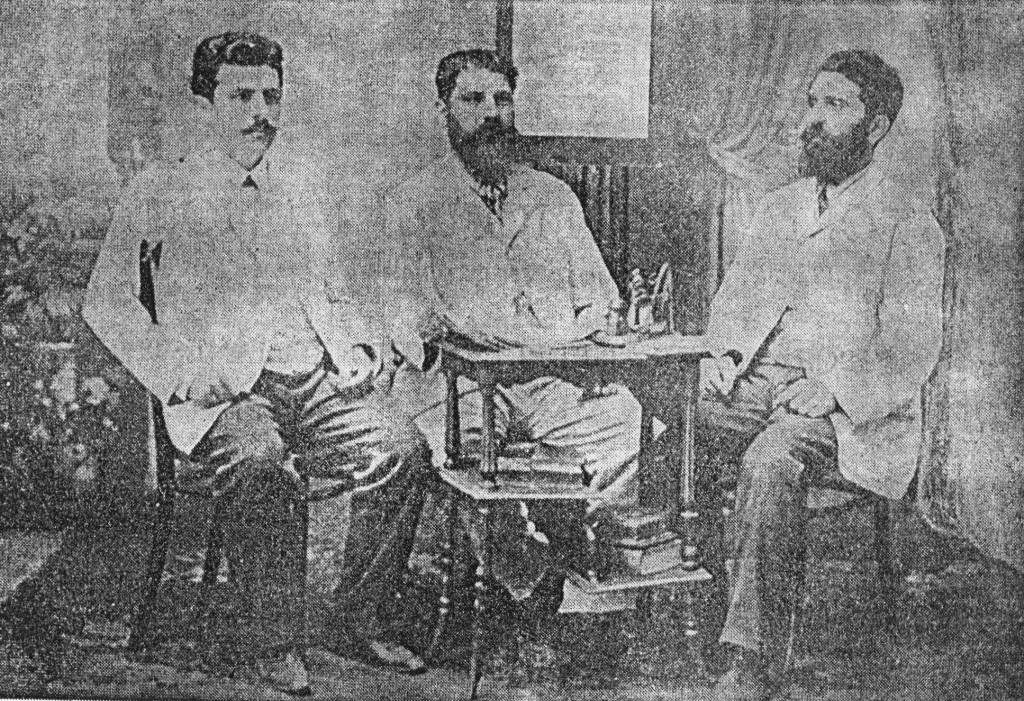
Ion Botez, Constantin Stere and Garabet Ibrăileanu

In its first editorial (1906), Viața Românească (a magazine which Stere had planned during his return to Bessarabia) summarized the cultural guidelines of the Poporanist trend, ones which Stere had first theorized in 1899 articles for Evenimentul Literar:

"A 'national' culture with specific characteristics will only be born when the large, truly Romanian, popular masses will partake in creating and assessing cultural values — literary language, literature, ways of living — and this will only be possible when, through culture, enlarged political participation and economical uplifting, the peasantry will be awarded a social value in proportion with its numerical, economical, moral and national values, when we shall be one people, when all the social classes shall be of the same people [...]."

Stere distanced himself from the competing and equally peasant-focused trend of Sămănătorul, which aimed to preserve the peasant way of life in front of modernization rather than enforce the peasant economy advocated by Poporanism. He was notably involved in polemics with Sămănătorul's Octavian Goga and Nicolae Iorga.

As he later admitted, he attempted to divert attention from the Șărcăleanu alias by making use of another one, P. Nicanor & Co. (used before and after him by various Viața Românească contributors to the magazine's closing column), and by writing an article in which he claimed Stere and Șărcăleanu were not one and the same, thus maintaining the relative ambiguity until the early 1930s.

=== 1907 Revolt and aftermath ===
Alongside other followers of Brătianu (including Garabet Ibrăileanu), Stere began campaigning in favor of dismissing the Conservative cabinet of Premier Gheorghe Grigore Cantacuzino, at a time when the latter also faced Take Ionescu's dissidence. This coincided with the outbreak of the 1907 Peasants' Revolt, which managed to bring down the cabinet after Ionescu agreed to support the Dimitrie Sturdza's return to power, as a means to ensure a response to the troubles. Like many other "generous ones", Stere was integrated in the new administration, and became a prefect of Iași County; instead of calling in the Romanian Army to pacify the area, he interfered in landowner-peasant relations to ensure better conditions for the latter, thus causing alarm in the Conservative camp. Although no violent reprisal against the rebels was recorded in his prefecture, his association with the repressive cabinet was the topic of criticism from many of his former allies, most notably Constantin Dobrogeanu-Gherea, Paul Bujor, and Constantin Mille. Together with his deputy prefect Gheorghe Gh. Mârzescu, Stere resigned his position in April and was replaced with Gheorghe Kernbach, preparing to run in the legislative election of that year — for the 2nd Electoral College in Iași; he won the seat in late May.

In early June, Premier Sturdza appointed Stere, alongside Take Ionescu, Petre P. Carp, Ion G. Duca, Alexandru Djuvara, Constantin Alimănișteanu, Ion and Alexandru G. Radovici, Dinu and Vintilă Brătianu, and 24 other parliamentarians, to a Committee charged with settling the agricultural issue; ultimately dissolved later in the same month, the Committee did not achieve any clear result, and Stere's radical proposals were repeatedly ignored by his own party. During the same period, a conflict erupted between Stere and the independent Antisemitic politician A. C. Cuza, who had been one of his opponents in the election; after making use of the word "trivial" in reference to Stere's attitudes, Cuza was sued by the latter, and refused a challenge to face him in a duel (an additional aspect of the scandal was the accusation that Stere had purposely failed students who supported Cuza's policies). Following the creation of Take Ionescu's Conservative-Democratic Party (PCD), the PNL launched accusations that the new group was financed by the leaseholder Mochi Fischer (whose property in Flămânzi had seen the outbreak of the 1907 revolt); in reaction, the PCD newspaper Opinia, representing the views of Alexandru Bădărău, accused Stere of having failed to protect the interests of his clients in the Bessarabian zemstvo — Stere challenged the article's author Gheorghe Lascăr, former mayor of Iași, to a duel on Copou Hill, during which Lascăr was defeated and injured (March 11, 1908).

Calling for an amnesty in respect to peasant rebels, Stere was initially silent on the new legislation (which, without questioning traditional landed property, allowed room for communal ownership), and was mostly absent from Chamber sessions. He nevertheless authored several studies in which he condemned the state of affairs in Romanian agriculture, concluding one of them with a Latin verdict, paraphrasing Pliny the Elder, Latifundia perdidere Romaniam ("The great estates have ruined Romania"). He expressed full support for the newly established agricultural bank, Casa Rurală, at a time when the project for its creation was voted in Parliament (February 1908).

=== First clashes with the PNL ===
After again siding with Brătianu during the inner-party conflict with Sturdza — culminating in Brătianu's arrival to power after the premier fell victim to a nervous disease —, Stere replaced Petre Poni at the head of the Liberal club in Iași (June 1908), and soon came to be opposed by Mârzescu over his promotion of former socialists to party offices. Following the PCD's rise to the detriment of the PNL, Stere was able to enlist his party's support for his vision of electoral reform (with a single electoral college, and idea also promoted by Take Ionescu), and reported on it in Parliament, being criticized by the Conservative opposition on the basis of suspicions that he was still promoting socialist ideals. By mid-1909, he was the target of a campaign in Evenimentul, which had by then turned Conservative, being again accused of having profited from the zemstvo in Bessarabia without providing the required services.

At the time, Stere and Ibrăileanu began mentioning the Poporanist or "democratic peasantist" trend as a small but representative faction of the PNL. Such attitudes caused further tensions inside his party: Henri Sanielevici, himself a former socialist National Liberal, commented that "[Stere] seeks to strengthen himself through and inside the Liberal Party and break with it only when he will become strong enough"; at a time when Brătianu was thought to be considering Stere for a cabinet position, the right-wing section of the PNL expressed its opposition and took steps to marginalize him (a catalysis for this attitude was the clash between the PNL and România Muncitoare affiliates, caused by the expulsion of the socialist activist Christian Rakovsky, together with promises made by Brătianu that his party would not push for land reform and universal suffrage). Largely absent from the political scene during 1909-1910, Constantin Stere nevertheless aided the PNL, fallen from power in December 1910, to reach an agreement with the Conservative-Democrats over opposition to the Petre P. Carp cabinet, by improving his relations with Alexandru Bădărău.

In his 1910 Neo-Serfdom (A Social and Economic Study of Our Land Issue), Dobrogeanu-Gherea viewed the relation between left-leaning cultural circles in Romania and Stere's Narodnik focus as conjectural, and made mention of competing trends inside Poporanism:

"[There is] the Poporanism established in this country around 15 years after [the Narodnik original] and from the very same source. Lacking the rigorous method of Marxism, [...] Poporanism appears to have being against Social Democracy as its sole attribute [...].
[There is also] our national, Romanian, Poporanism, as it has originated from the different and real circumstances of our country. [It] is more practical than theoretical, and does not in fact have its own theory. Mr. Stere's effort to award it one was not at all successful. But this Poporanism has its own views and attitudes and — what's more important — its own praxis. And to this real praxis, influencing the real course of things in this country, all kinds of Poporanists have associated themselves in one way or another, including those who are under the influence of Russian [Narodnik ideas]. But even this national Poporanism is far, very far from being uniform. This can even be seen in those multiple groupings composing it, [...] which many times quarrel with one another."

The apparent heterogeneous character of Poporanism was also criticized by others, who noted that its discourse also featured nationalist rhetoric. Nevertheless, PSDMR members other than Dobrogeanu-Gherea tended to refer to Viața Românească as "engaged in Sterist politics". Constantin Stere had a moderate reaction to the publishing of Neo-Serfdom, briefly criticizing the arguments it brought against Poporanist politics (with Dobrogeanu-Gherea's renewed message that socialism was possible in backward countries); additional replies to the thesis came from Stere's disciple, the engineer Nicolae Profiri (among others who engaged in the debate was Dobrogeanu-Gherea's son, the future Leninist Alexandru Dobrogeanu-Gherea).

Around 1912, while visiting Florence, Italy, Stere began a long extra-marital relationship with Ana Radovici, the widow of Ion Radovici (the latter had committed suicide in 1909). No longer elected to the Chamber in the 1912 suffrage, he returned to his chair at the Iași University. During the electoral campaign, reelected leader of the Liberal club, he was again attacked by Evenimentul, and, having taken part in denouncing A. C. Cuza for plagiarism, clashed with his supporters (who briefly occupied the PNL headquarters in Iași in May).

=== World War I ===
In 1916, Stere strongly supported Romania's alliance with the Central Powers, arguing in favor of a policy focused on Bessarabia's recovery and against what he saw as Russian expansionism - ultimately, this led him to split with the pro-Entente PNL upon the outbreak of World War I. The socialist Ioan Nădejde commented on the fact that Stere had become rivals with members of the Romanian Social Democratic Workers' Party who had joined the PNL in 1899, and especially with their leader Vasile Morțun. He joined his voice to a diverse intellectual opposition which also included the Conservative Party's Petre P. Carp and Alexandru Marghiloman, the left-leaning writers Tudor Arghezi, Dimitrie D. Pătrășcanu, and Gala Galaction, as well as the revolutionary socialist Christian Rakovsky.

Following the occupation of Bucharest by the Central Powers, Stere remained in the city, in contrast with the mass the Bucharesters who followed the Romanian authorities' refuge to Iași. With financial support from Alexandru Vaida-Voevod, he began publishing his Lumina, a newspaper that was nevertheless, according to its editor, "supportive of the Romanian point of view" and thus subject to censorship ("a German [censorship], for [views on] external politics [...] and for internal politics [the one] exercised by Petre P. Carp's men, who cut out my articles on expropriation [that is, land reform] and universal suffrage").

In late March 1918, he represented the Alexandru Marghiloman government in Chișinău, during the time after the February and October Revolutions when Bessarabia had proclaimed itself a Moldavian Democratic Republic — he was charged with assisting Ion Inculeț in proposing a union of Bessarabia and Romania in Sfatul Țării, the republic's legislative assembly. After prolonged debates, the vote was carried in favor of union on March 27 (see Greater Romania).

With the change in fortunes brought by the Armistice with Germany, Stere was charged with treason and imprisoned; never facing trial, he was eventually set free.

=== Creation of the Peasants' Party ===
In the late 1910s, he became discreetly involved in the movement that led to the creation of the Bessarabian Peasants' Party (founded and led by Pan Halippa and Ion Inculeț). In late 1918, most of it merged into Ion Mihalache's Peasants' Party (PȚ), of which he and Halippa became high-ranking members (Inculeț disagreed with the political union, and led a smaller party that eventually merged into the PNL).

Stere caused a scandal after running and winning elections for the Chamber of Deputies of Romania in Soroca (1921, under the Alexandru Averescu government), when all parties joined Nicolae Iorga in opposition to his appointment in office (Iorga considered Stere's anti-Entente past to be equivalent with treason). Fears of Bolshevik appeal in Bessarabia led to widespread allegations that the former socialist Stere was "Bolshevizing" the region. Speaking from the non-communist Left, Ioan Nădejde expressed concerns that Stere was radicalizing his message:

"[...] Stere aims to scrape together a socialist party, allied with the Peasants' Party, against all other social classes, and thus follows a policy out of which, in the end, we could only get Bolshevism."

In 1919, Stere had shown his awareness of that he and his party were being criticised by various political groups claiming Marxist orthodoxy, far left included. Stating again his belief in the fragile and minority position of industrial proletarians in the landscape of Romanian economy of the period, he indicated that the latter class was destined to adapt its demands to the interests of the peasantry:

"[...] for a country such as Romania, it is obvious that the urban working class' fate is literally in the hands of the rural working class. [...]
In these conditions, would it not be an act of suicide from the industrial working class of Romania if it were to adopt a hostile attitude toward the peasantry?
And: it is obvious that, no matter what the political and social doctrine preached by the urban proletariat, it would become hostile toward the peasantry if it wanted to impose upon it a form of economic structuring rejected by the peasantry, such as, for one, the immediate and violent socialization of peasant agriculture.
A socialist worker expresses, in the pages of [a socialist journal], the fear that the Peasants' Party of Romania will follow the example of the peasant parties in Bulgaria and Serbia [that is, the Bulgarian Agrarian National Union and the Serbian Peasant Party], who, once in power, are said to have oppressed the workers.
But can this serve as an argument against the solidarity in interests of the workers in villages and cities?
In these murky times, we have also assisted to the spectacle of bloody repression, by a socialist government [formed by the Social Democratic Party of Germany], of the workers' movements in Germany.
Does this mean that there is a real conflict of interests between those elements of the German proletariat that are being led by the orthodox Social Democracy, and the elements that follow the banner of the Independent Party?"

=== Scandal and dissidence ===
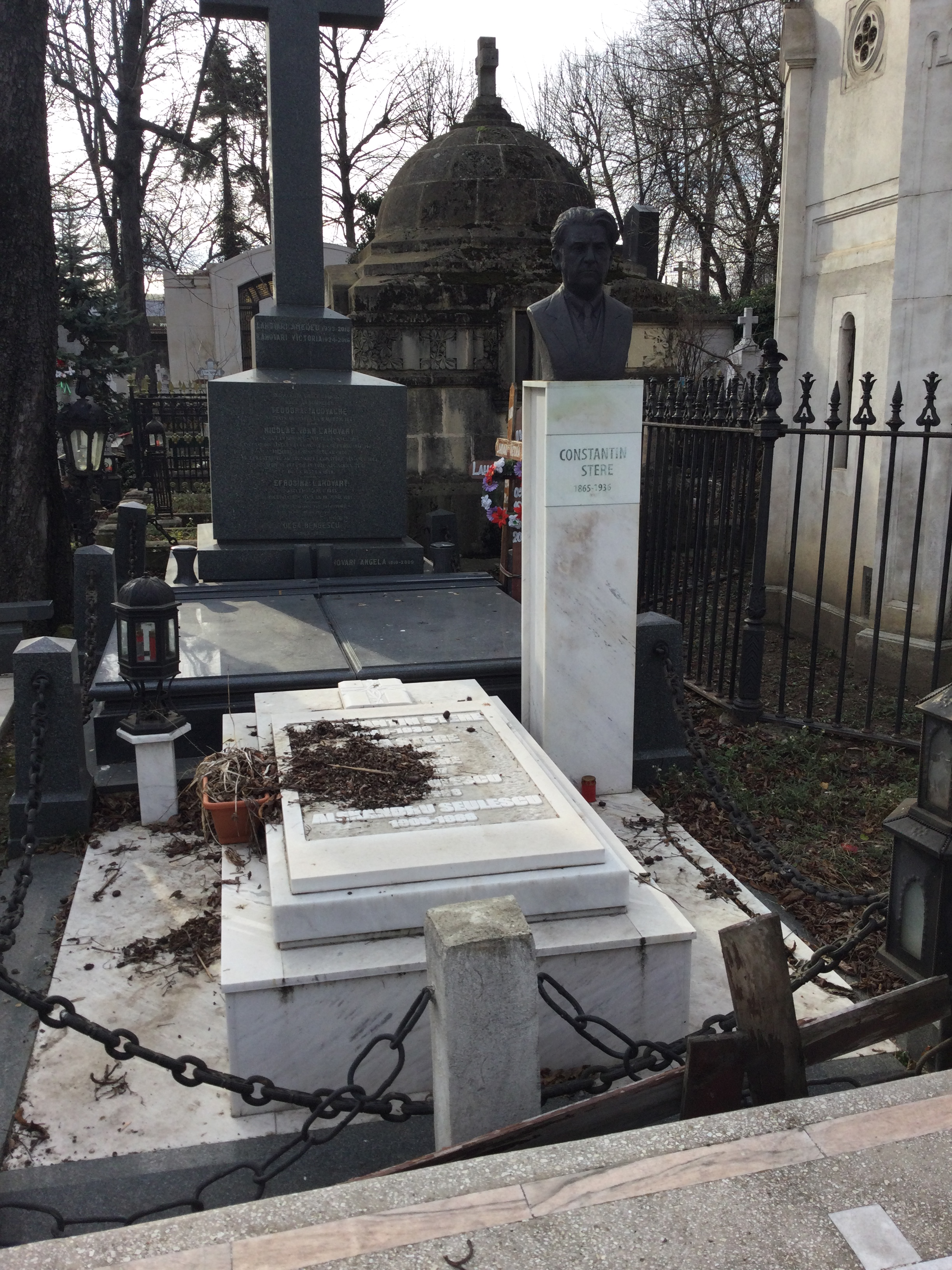
Grave at Bellu Cemetery

Stere's position in his party's leadership prevented it from entering a close union with the Transylvania-based Romanian National Party (PNR) in 1924, as the PNR's leaders resented his anti-Entente past.

Two years later, however, he was admitted as one of the leaders of the newly created National Peasants' Party, a fusion of the two groups that was partly aided by the attack of National Liberal agents on Pan Halippa and the government's refusal to punish the guilty. Stere was the author of a legislation which aimed at providing for a degree of administrative decentralization and local initiative in government, passed in 1929 by the Iuliu Maniu executive.

He soon clashed with the more conservative politicians who had been members of the PNR. In March 1930, the mention of his name during a public celebration provoked a number of Romanian Army generals to leave in protest; immediately after, the National Liberal group around Vintilă Brătianu began attacking Stere's party for harbouring him, and for causing a split between Army and political establishment. General Henry Cihoschi, the Minister of Defense, was publicly criticized in parliament for not siding with his subordinates, and had to resign on April 4; Maniu appeared to support Stere's ousting.

In reply, Stere again expressed his view that Romania's government had been wrong in 1916, and left to create the minor Democratic Peasants' Party–Stere (not to be confused with the one created later by Nicolae L. Lupu), which he led into a union with Grigore Iunian's Radical Peasants' Party.

== Legacy ==
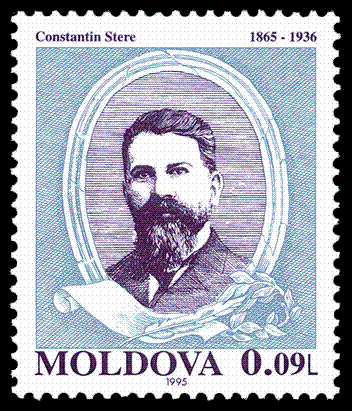
1995 stamp

Despite his dissidence, Stere's ideas remained highly influential inside the National Peasants' Party, and constituted a major influence on the doctrines of Virgil Madgearu. Poporanism, alongside Marxism itself, was a contributing factor in Dimitrie Gusti's original theories on sociology.

Stere's original ideas on economic development and Marxist topics were subject to censorship in Communist Romania; although works on him were published after the establishment of Nicolae Ceaușescu's rule, they generally avoided presenting and quoting his writings. Described as a "reactionary" until the 1960s, he was considered by revised official historiography to have taken a "radical-bourgeoisie position". In 2010, the Romanian Academy granted posthumous membership to Constantin Stere.

În preajma revoluției first appeared in eight volumes between 1932 and 1936, when it met with popular and critical success, although this was largely due to the fact that its author was cloaked in legend. The Communist regime banned the work for its duration, considering it unpublishable, even after Ceaușescu steered a course away from Soviet tutelage. The book was published between 1990 and 1991 at Chișinău, while Stere's biographer Zigu Ornea put out another edition in 1991-1993. Both editions of the somewhat problematic 2331-page text were flawed, and in 2010, the Iași-based literary historian Victor Durnea began publishing a critical, annotated edition of Stere's works, starting with the novel. The manuscripts no longer exist, Stere's archive in his country house at Bucov having mysteriously disappeared after World War II, so that Durnea's interventions were limited to introducing uniformity into the available text, eliminating arbitrary decisions both by Stere and his editors, and replacing obsolete terms and punctuation that resulted from the author's culturally Russian outlook.

In 2020, a bust was unveiled in the city of Rezina (Moldova). The author is Moldovan sculptor Veaceslav Jiglitski.
