= Dîngeni =

- Commune
- Location within Moldova
- Coordinates: 48.3480555556°N 27.4813888889°E
- Country: Moldova
- District: Ocnița District

Population (2014)
  - Total: 1,567
- Time zone: UTC+2 (EET)
  - Summer (DST): UTC+3 (EEST)

Dîngeni is a commune in Ocnița District, Moldova. It is composed of two villages, Dîngeni and Grinăuți.
