= Sudarca =

- Commune
- Location within Moldova
- Coordinates: 48.3052777778°N 27.7869444444°E
- Country: Moldova
- District: Dondușeni

Population (2014)
  - Total: 1,753
- Time zone: UTC+2 (EET)
  - Summer (DST): UTC+3 (EEST)

Sudarca is a commune in Dondușeni District, Moldova. It is composed of two villages, Braicău and Sudarca.
