= Frunză, Ocnița =

Town in Ocnița district, Moldova

Coordinates: 48°24′27″N 27°35′55″E

Frunză (Romanian pronunciation: [ˈfrunzə]) is a town in Ocnița district, Moldova. In 2014 it had 1,400 inhabitants.
