= Radio Moldova =

Public radio broadcaster in Moldova

- Type: Radio network
- Country: Moldova

Programming
- Language(s): Romanian

Ownership
- Owner: Teleradio-Moldova
- Key people: Alexandru Dorogan

History
- Launch date: October 8, 1939; 86 years ago
- Former names: Radio Basarabia

Coverage
- Availability: International

Links
- Website: Radio Moldova

Radio Moldova (Romanian: Radio Moldova, RM) is the first publicly funded radio broadcaster in Moldova.

== History ==
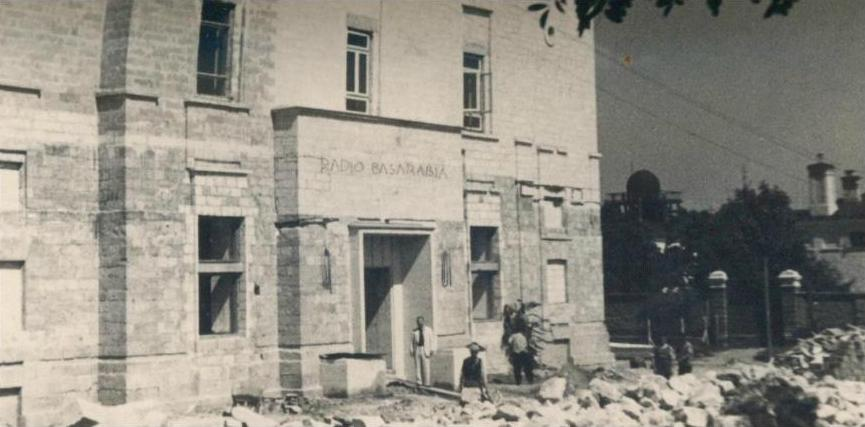
The building of the radio station in Chișinău under construction in 1937

The first radio transmission in Moldova was broadcast on 1 November 1928 by the Radiotelephonic Broadcasting Company in Bucharest. On 30 October 1930, in Tiraspol started broadcasting a Soviet radio station of 4 kW whose main purpose was the anti-Romanian propaganda to Moldova between Prut and Dniester. A new radio mast, M. Gorky, built in 1936 in Tiraspol, allowed a greater coverage of the territory of Bessarabia. In that context, in 1937, Chişinău City Hall gave the Romanian Radio Broadcasting Company a building to open the first radio station in Chişinău, to counter Soviet propaganda. Experimental programs began in the early days of June 1939. The transmitter installed by Marconi Company in Chişinău was the best in Romania. The first radio station in Chişinău was "twice stronger than that of Bucharest or that one in Tiraspol" wrote Gazeta Basarabiei in July 1939.

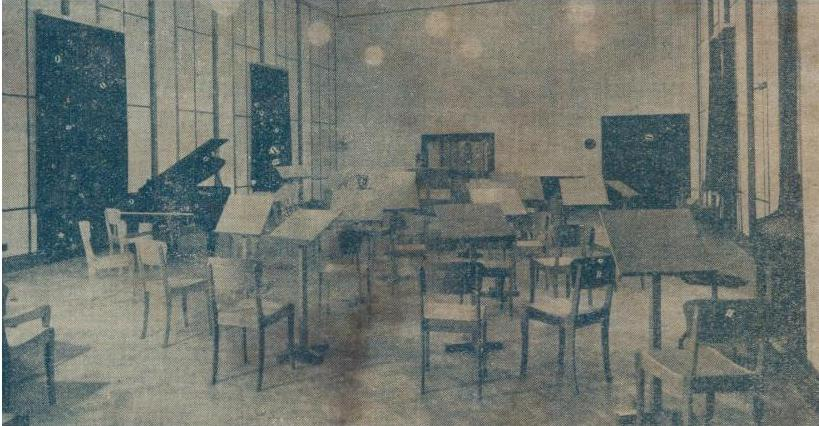
Radio Basarabia in 1940

On October 8, 1939, Radio Basarabia (with own shows in Romanian and Russian) was launched in Chişinău by the Romanian Radio Broadcasting Company. A religious service was broadcast from the Nativity Cathedral at the launching of the first radio station in Chişinău. Emission power could be increased from 20 kW to 200 kW and the reception was possible in Moscow or Leningrad due to direct wave propagation. There were three studios, the biggest for symphony orchestras, choirs and opera band, the middle for chamber music and soloists, and the third allocated to lecturers and announcer, equipped with the most modern equipment. Radio Bessarabia had six services: the Secretariat, Technical Service, Service Programs, Administrative Service, Litigation department, and Commercial department. With the Soviet occupation in June 1940 most of the backup material, personnel and the archive were withdrawn at Huși, but not the transmitter. The Red Army blown up the building and the bodies of those who remained to work for the radio were found in a water well.

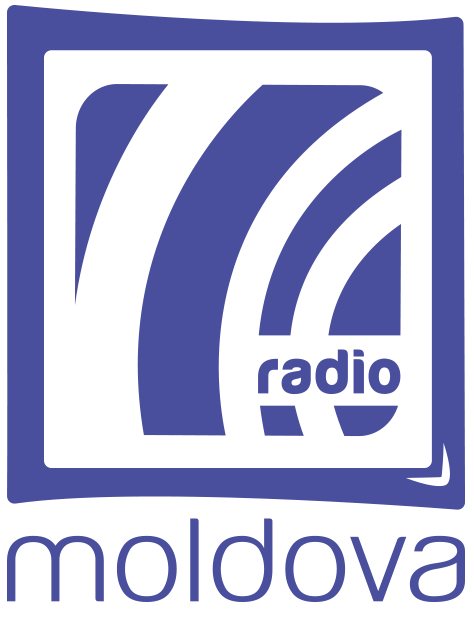
Former logo (2018–2025)

On February 6, 2010, the Observers' Council (CO) of Teleradio-Moldova elected Alexandru Dorogan as director of "Radio Moldova" with eight of nine votes in the third round of elections. Dorogan (b. August 26, 1952) was the director of the Association of Electronic Press of Moldova (1999–2010). Veaceslav Gheorghişenco was dismissed on December 30, 2009 "for serious violation of his work duties and namely of Article 7 of the Broadcast Code".

== Notable people ==
- Arcadie Gherasim
- Valentina Tăzlăuanu
- Valeriu Saharneanu
- Nicolae Lupan
- Todur Zanet

== See also ==
- Media in Moldova
- Union of Journalists of Moldova
