= Dondușeni =

- Location in Moldova
- Coordinates: 48°13′N 27°35′E
- Country: Moldova
- District: Dondușeni District

Government
  - Mayor: Ion Zloi (PSRM)

Area
  - Total: 3.031 sq mi (7.850 km^{2})
- Elevation: 715 ft (218 m)

Population (2014)
  - Total: 7,101
  - Density: 2,343/sq mi (904.6/km^{2})
- Time zone: UTC+2 (EET)
  - Summer (DST): UTC+3 (EEST)
- Climate: Dfb

Dondușeni (Romanian pronunciation: [donduˈʃenʲ]) is a city in Moldova. It is located in the north-eastern part of the country. It is the largest city and administrative center of Dondușeni District. Spread across an area of 7.85 km^{2} (3.03 sq mi), the town had a population of 7,101 inhabitants in 2014.

== Geography ==
Dondușeni is located in Dondușeni District of Moldova. It is located in the southeastern Europe and in the north-eastern part of Moldova. Spread across an area of 7.85 km^{2} (3.03 sq mi), it is the largest center of the district. It is one of 23 sub-divisions (city of Dondușeni and 22 communes) in the district. It is part of the Bessarabia region.

== Demographics ==
Historical population

Year	Pop.	±%
1930	953	—
1959	5,129	+438.2%
1970	7,226	+40.9%
1979	9,256	+28.1%

Year	Pop.	±%
1989	11,398	+23.1%
2004	9,801	−14.0%
2014	7,101	−27.5%

According to the 2014 census, the population of Donduseri was 7,101 inhabitants, a decrease compared to the previous census in 2004, when 9,801 inhabitants were registered. Of these, 3,233 were men and 3,868 were women. About 954 inhabitants were under the age of fourteen, and 1,246 inhabitants were above the age of 65 years. The entire population lived in urban areas. The town had an expatriate population of 566 individuals, of which eight belonged to the European Union and rest all belonged to the Commonwealth of Independent States. The population is further projected to reduce over the next few decades. The city had a Human Development Index of 0.699 in 2015.

Moldovans formed the major ethnic group (65.8%), with Ukrainians (19.3%) and Russians (9.2%) forming a significant minority. Moldovan language was the most spoken language, spoken to by 3,578 (51.6%) inhabitants, with Russian (26.9%) and Romanian (12.4%) spoken by significant minorities. About 97.1% of the population followed Eastern Orthodox Christianity, and 2.8% of the population followed other religions.

Ethnic composition of Dondușeni (2014)
1. Moldovans* (65.8%)
2. Romanians (4.71%)
3. Ukrainians (19.3%)
4. Russians (9.16%)
5. Others (1.07%)
:Linguistic composition of Dondușeni (2014)
1. Moldovan* (51.6%)
2. Romanian (12.4%)
3. Russian (26.8%)
4. Ukrainian (8.85%)
5. Other (0.35%)

Footnotes:

* There is an ongoing controversy regarding the ethnic identification of Moldovans and Romanians.

* Moldovan language is one of the two local names for the Romanian language in Moldova. In 2013, the Constitutional Court of Moldova interpreted that Article 13 of the constitution is superseded by the Declaration of Independence, thus giving official status to the name Romanian.

At the 1930 census, the locality (then a village) was known as Dondoșani-Gară (literally Dondoșani Station), and had a population of 953. It was part of Plasa Climăuți of Soroca County.

Ethnic composition (1930 Census)
Romanians	338
Ruthenians (Ukrainians)	42
Russians	280
Jews	277
Bulgarians	1
Poles	13
Germans	1
Serbians, Croatians, Slovenes	1
Total	953

Linguistic composition (1930 census)
Romanian	340
Yiddish	270
Russian	196
Ukrainian	138
Polish	7
German	1
Serbo-Croatian, Slovene	1
Total	953

== Bibliography ==
Veaceslav Ioniță, Ghidul orașelor din Republica Moldova/ Veaceslav Ioniță. Igor Munteanu, Irina Beregoi. Chișinău: TISH, 2004 (F.E.-P. Tipografia Centrală). 248 p. ISBN 9975-947-39-5
