= Scăieni =

- Village
- Location within Moldova
- Coordinates: 48.1763877868652340°N 27.5766658782959000°E
- Country: Moldova
- District: Dondușeni District

Government
  - Mayor: Lucian Racu (PLDM)

Population (2014 census)
  - Total: 1,617
- Time zone: UTC+2 (EET)
  - Summer (DST): UTC+3 (EEST)
- Postal code: MD-5134

Scăieni is a village in Dondușeni District, Moldova.
