= Corbu, Dondușeni =

Corbu
- Village
- Location within Moldova
- Coordinates: 48°16′N 27°34′E
- Country: Moldova
- District: Dondușeni District
- Elevation: 234 m (768 ft)

Population (2014 census)
  - Total: 1,282
- Time zone: UTC+2 (EET)
  - Summer (DST): UTC+3 (EEST)
- Postal code: MD-5119

Corbu is a village in Dondușeni District, Moldova.
