= Briceni, Dondușeni =

Briceni
- Village
- Location within Moldova
- Coordinates: 48.3572222222°N 27.7036111111°E
- Country: Moldova
- District: Dondușeni

Government
  - Mayor: Liviu Scorțesco (PDM)

Population (2014 census)
  - Total: 659
- Time zone: UTC+2 (EET)
  - Summer (DST): UTC+3 (EEST)

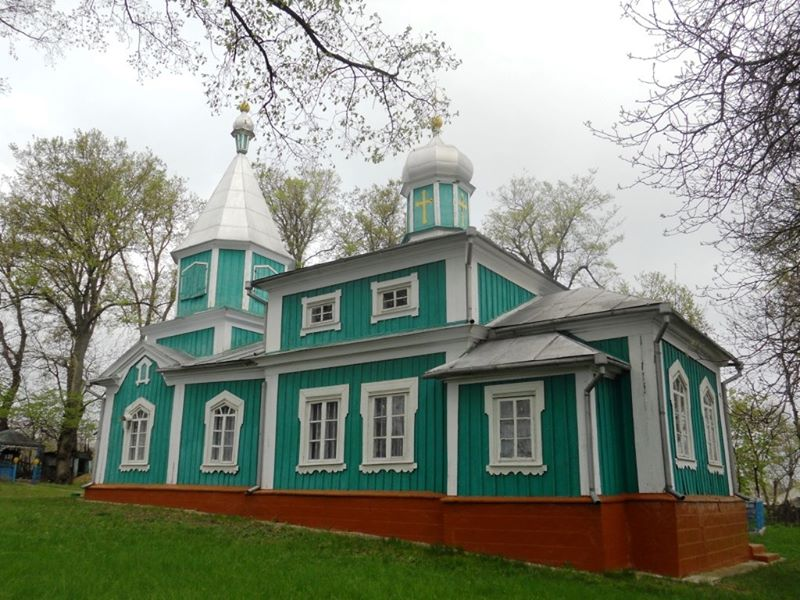

Briceni (Russian: Брича́ны, romanized: Brichany) is a village in Dondușeni District, in northern Moldova.
