= Țaul =

- Village
- Location within Moldova
- Coordinates: 48.2158333333°N 27.6727777778°E
- Country: Moldova
- District: Dondușeni District

Government
  - Mayor: Andronii Mitrica (PLDM)

Population (2014 census)
  - Total: 3,092
- Time zone: UTC+2 (EET)
  - Summer (DST): UTC+3 (EEST)

Țaul is a village in Dondușeni District, Moldova.
