= Baraboi River =

Baraboi River may refer to:

- Baraboi River (Black Sea) - runs to the Black Sea in Odesa Oblast, Ukraine
- Baraboi River (Vameș), tributary of the Vameș River in Romania

== See also ==
- Baraboi (disambiguation)
