= Hădărăuți =

- Village
- Location in Moldova
- Coordinates: 48°22′N 27°20′E
- Country: Moldova
- District: Ocnița District
- established: 1421

Area
  - Total: 13.31 sq mi (34.46 km^{2})
- Elevation: 920 ft (280 m)

Population (2014 census)
  - Total: 1,848
  - Density: 138.9/sq mi (53.63/km^{2})
- Time zone: UTC+2 (EET)
  - Summer (DST): UTC+3 (EEST)
- Postal code: MD-7124
- Area code: +373 271

Hădărăuți is a village in Ocnița District, Moldova.

== Notable people ==
- Ion Ciubuc (1943 – 2018), economist and politician who served as the third Prime Minister of Moldova
- Oleg Serebrian (born 1969), politician, writer, diplomat, and political scientist
