= Horodiște, Dondușeni =

Horodiște
- Village
- Location in Moldova
- Coordinates: 48°15′54″N 27°47′21″E
- Country: Moldova
- District: Dondușeni District
- Elevation: 676 ft (206 m)

Population (2014 census)
  - Total: 768
- Time zone: UTC+2 (EET)
  - Summer (DST): UTC+3 (EEST)
- Postal code: MD-5124
- Area code: +373 251

Horodiște is a village in Dondușeni District, Moldova.

== Natives ==
- Ion Druță
- Constantin Stere

== Bibliography ==
- Monitorul Oficial al R. Moldova nr.16/53 din 29.01.2002. Legea nr. 764-XV/2001 privind organizarea administrativ-teritorială a Republicii Moldova.
- Harta Topografică a Republicii Moldova 1:200,000 (actualizată în annul 2004).
- INGEOCAD, 2000. Date attributive despre populație a hărții digitale 1:400,000.
- Biroul Național de Statistică a Republicii Moldova. Rezultatele Recensămîntului Populației din 2004.
