= Ocnița District =

Ocnița District Raionul Ocnița
- District
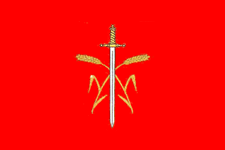
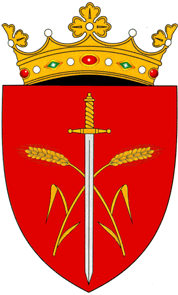
- Flag Coat of arms

- Country: Republic of Moldova
- Administrative center (Oraș-reședință): Ocnița
- Established: 2002

Government
  - Raion president: Iurie Plopa (PSRM), since 2023

Area
  - Total: 598.7 km^{2} (231.2 sq mi)
  - Water: 7.4 km^{2} (2.9 sq mi) 1.23%
- Elevation: 280 m (920 ft)

Population (2024)
  - Total: 31,610
  - Density: 52.80/km^{2} (136.7/sq mi)
- Time zone: UTC+2 (EET)
  - Summer (DST): UTC+3 (EEST)
- Area code: 373 71
- Car plates: OC
- Website: ocnita.md

Ocnița (Romanian pronunciation: [ˈoknitsa]) is a district (Romanian: raion) in the north of Moldova, with the administrative center at Ocnița. The other major cities are Otaci and Frunză. As of the 2024 Moldovan census, its population was 31,610.

== History ==
The first evidence of a locality in the district comes from 1419, when is attested the city Otaci, called Stânca Vămii. Other historical attestations of district towns down to the period 1422–1431 when the localities are listed first: Hădărăuți, Mihălășeni, Lipnic, Naslavcea and others. 20 August 1470, at Lipnic (Lipinți) was famous Battle of Lipnic, the river, where the Moldavian military, led by Stephen the Great, defeated the armies of the Crimean Khanate led by Murtada. After the fight Khan son and his brother Eminec are captured and taken as prisoners. In the following centuries the territory adjacent to the boundary of the district today is the Principality of Moldavia: Grand Duchy of Lithuania later the Polish-Lithuanian Union and Russian Empire. In 1812, the district and Bessarabia as a whole were occupied by the Russian Empire after the Treaty of Bucharest. In 1918 with the Union of Bessarabia with Romania, the area became part of Hotin County. In 1940, following the Molotov–Ribbentrop Pact Bessarabia was occupied by the Soviet Union. In 2004 the district had 56,500 inhabitants.

== Geography ==
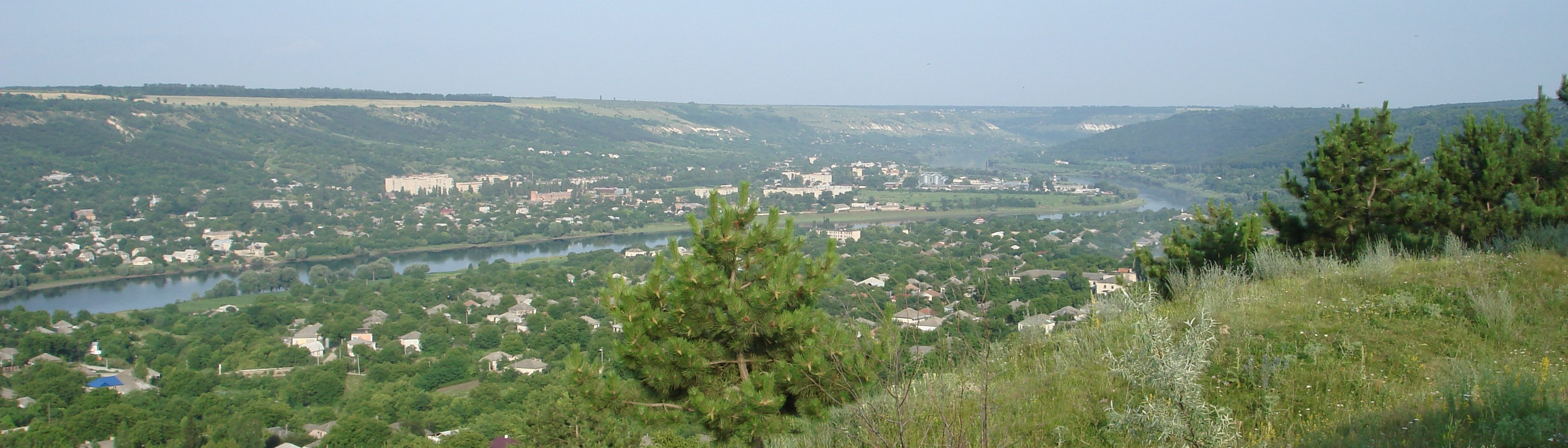
Nistru near the Otaci

Ocnița district is located in northern Moldova; it borders with Briceni District to the west and with Edineț and Dondușeni districts to the south and southeast. To the north it borders Ukraine, between meridians 27°10′W and 27°50′W and 48°25′N. The most northerly point of the Republic of Moldova is located in Ocnița district: the village Naslavcea, with coordinates: 48°28′02″N, 27°35′04″W.

In general, the terrain is characterized by plains and gentle hills. Over the many little rivers, valleys landforms gets injured. Here come the daylight limestone rocks, forming rocky areas, called Toltre. In district is extracted precious building materials: limestone, quartz sand, clay shale. The maximum altitude in the district is located near the village of Hădărăuți, reaching heights of 280 m (920 ft).

=== Climate ===
Ocnița district has a temperate continental climate and the four seasons are well pronounced in winter is mild, spring – unstable and short summer – long and warm and the autumn – long and sunny. The average air temperature ranges from 7.5 to 10 °C (45 to 50 °F), positive temperature recorded in 165–200 days a year. Rainfall between 370 and 560mm/year, about 10% of which falls as snow, which can melt several times during winter.

=== Fauna ===
The fauna of the district is typical of central and eastern Europe and includes: hedgehogs, wild boars, foxes, rabbits, badgers, polecats, and rarely deer, spotted deer, wolves, and raccoon dogs.

=== Flora ===
Forests occupy 13.7% of district territory that include common oak, sessile oak, cherry, lime, and ash. Other plants include: fescue, nettle, clover, peony, and more.

=== Rivers ===
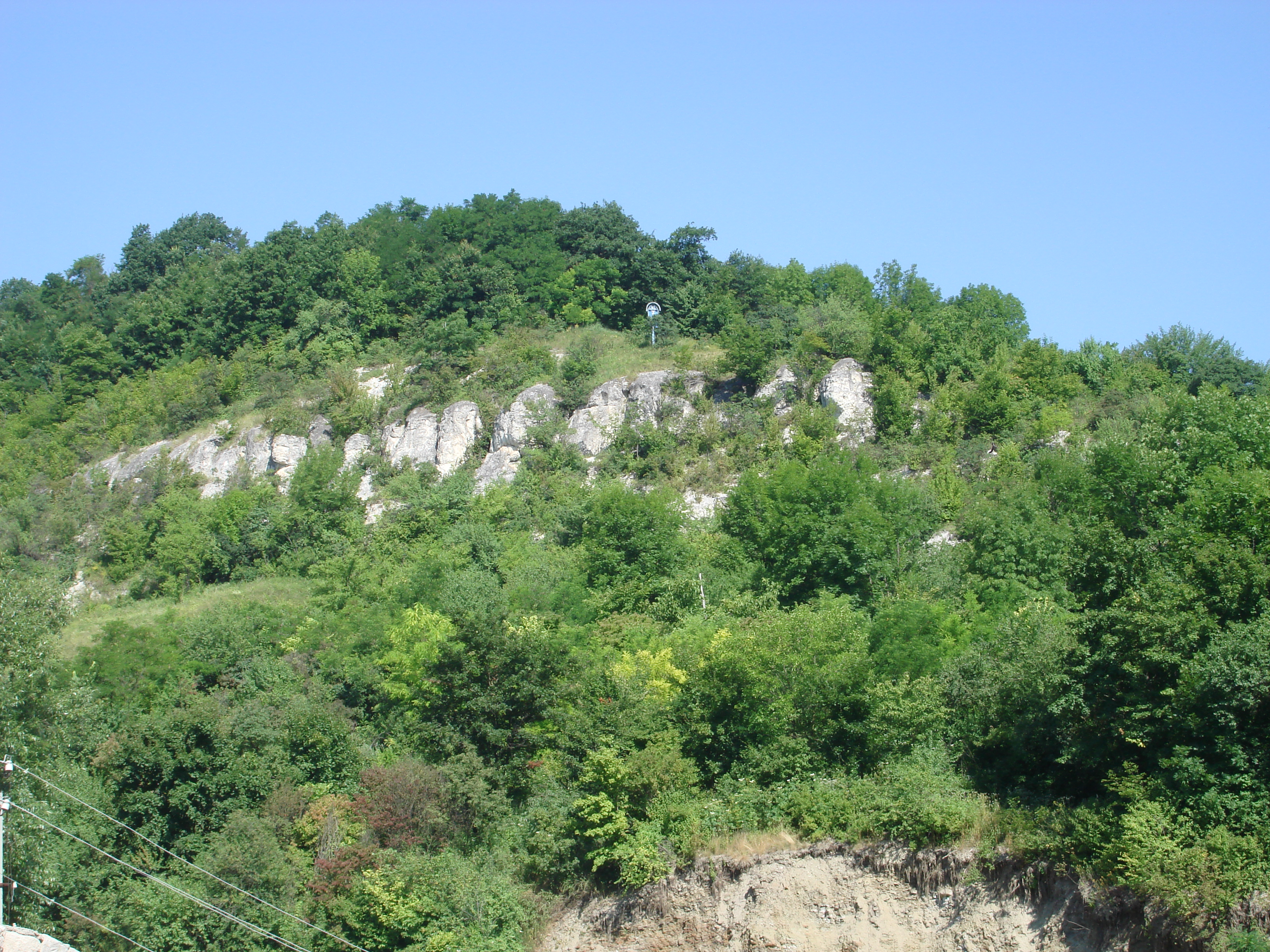
Călărașeuca landscape reserve

Ocnița district is located in the basins of two rivers. The Nistru is in the east-central part, and runs through the district with a length with tributaries of 20–30 km. The Prut river basin is located in the south-western part of the district and has as tributaries in the upper part the Racovăț and the Ciuhur.

=== Protected areas ===
- Calarașovca landscape reserve
- Climăuți nature reserve
- La 33 de Vaduri landscape reserve
- Mestecăniș nature reserve
- Ocnița nature reserve
- Rudi–Arionești landscape reserve

== Administrative subdivisions ==
- Localities: 33
  - Cities: Frunză, Ocnița, Otaci
    - Villages: 12
      - Commons: 18

== Demographics ==
In the 2024 Census, the district population was 31,610 of which 29.6% lived in urban areas while 70.4% lived in rural areas.

=== Ethnic groups ===
Ethnic group	% of total
Moldovans *	69.4
Ukrainians	18.7
Romani	5.8
Russians	3.9
Romanians *	1.7
Gagauz	0.1
Bulgarians	0.1
Other	0.2
Undeclared	0.1

Footnote: * There is an ongoing controversy regarding the ethnic identification of Moldovans and Romanians.

=== Religion ===
- Christians – 98.9%
  - Orthodox Christians – 95.4%
  - Protestant – 3.5%
- Other – 0.2%
- No religion – 0.3%
- No Declared - 0.6%

== Economy ==
Agriculture occupies a central role in the economy of the district. In farming district in recent years there have been radical changes in relations of production, related to the transition to a market economy, to abandon the methods of centralized rule, changing property relations and forms of management. From an institutional perspective, the agricultural sector of the district is covered by a multitude of forms of organization and legal – 3 agricultural production cooperatives that process in 2,448 ha of land, 3-stock holding companies 3,508 ha, 28 limited liability companies with a total area of 13,328 hectares, 42 farms with a total area of 8458 ha and 3,979 ha of farmland are processed individually. The district is in total 5,015 registered companies.

District Directorate of Agriculture and Food, orient their work towards the organization and training of managers and professionals from large and small farms. An important role in achieving the expected results is agricultural machinery. Park tractors and agricultural machinery in the district consists of: Tractors – 450 units, combine – 78 un, seeder – 172 un, growing 190 un, watering – 46 un, combination – 10 un, plows – 201 un.

== Transportation ==
Rail is the principal district to transport goods and fuel, but also the routes to human transport: Chișinău, Bălți, Chernivtsi, Iași, Moscow, Kyiv, St. Petersburg and others. Bălți–Chernivtsi railway passing through the cities Otaci–Frunză–Ocnița was built between 1892 and 1897, when it is documented and targeted the railway station Ocnița built in 1897. Road transport is vital to passenger transport routes are more inter-regional, inter-republican and international.

== Politics ==
Ocnița district is located in the so-called "Red North", where, starting with the 2001 elections, the Party of Communists of the Republic of Moldova (PCRM) has been getting over 50% of the vote. For the last three elections, though, the Communists have been in constant decline. The district is one of the founding members of Euroregion Dniester.

During the last three elections, the Alliance for European Integration (AEI) had an increase of 104% in votes.

=== Elections ===
Parliament elections results
Year	AEI	PCRM
2010	35.31% 9,000	60.08% 15,310
July 2009	31.20% 7,901	65.92% 16,692
April 2009	16.77% 4,412	67.59% 17,045

Summary of 28 November 2010 Parliament of Moldova election results in Ocnița District
Parties and coalitions	Votes	%	+/−
Party of Communists of the Republic of Moldova	15,310	60.08	−5.84
Democratic Party of Moldova	4,141	16.25	+1.53
Liberal Democratic Party of Moldova	3,273	12.84	+3.84
Party Alliance Our Moldova	895	3.51	−0.15
Liberal Party	691	2.71	−1.11
Other Party	1,187	4.61	+1.73
Total (turnout 62.67%)	25,766	100.00	

== Education ==
In Ocnița District are 32 educational institutions operating: in schools – 5482 children in agro-college – 242 in polyvalent vocational schools – 196. Currently in educational institutions operating in the district 652 teachers. After the 2010 education reform is proposed to open more grammar schools and high schools is proposed closed all environments.

== Culture ==
The district Ocnița has six museums, 153 artistic works, 15 bands holding the title of the band model, 30 public libraries.

== Health ==
The district Ocnița has two hospitals with general fund of 200 beds, a center of family doctors in the composition of which are 20 family physician offices, six health centers, a medical point. In Health Care operates 96 doctors, 322 personal care environment, 218 and auxiliary medical personnel.

== Personalities ==
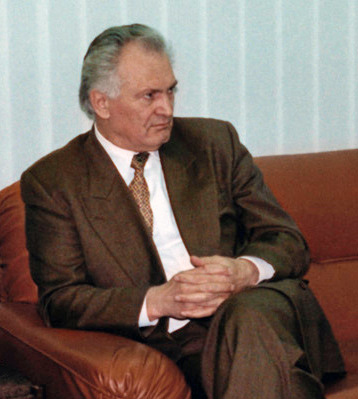
Ion Ciubuc

- Andrei Sangheli – Prime Minister of the Republic of Moldova in 1992–1997
- Constantin Stamati – Romanian writer, one of the founding members of the Romanian Academic Society
- Emil Loteanu – Actor, director, poet and writer
- Ion Ciubuc – Prime Minister of the Republic of Moldova in 1997–1999
- Marcel Răducan – Minister of Construction and Regional Development of 2009
- Oleg Serebrian – Political scientist, essayist, politician and diplomat, Ambassador of the Republic of Moldova in France of 2010
- Valeriu Cosarciuc – Minister of Agriculture and Food Industry of Moldova in 2009–2011
