= Naslavcea =

- Village
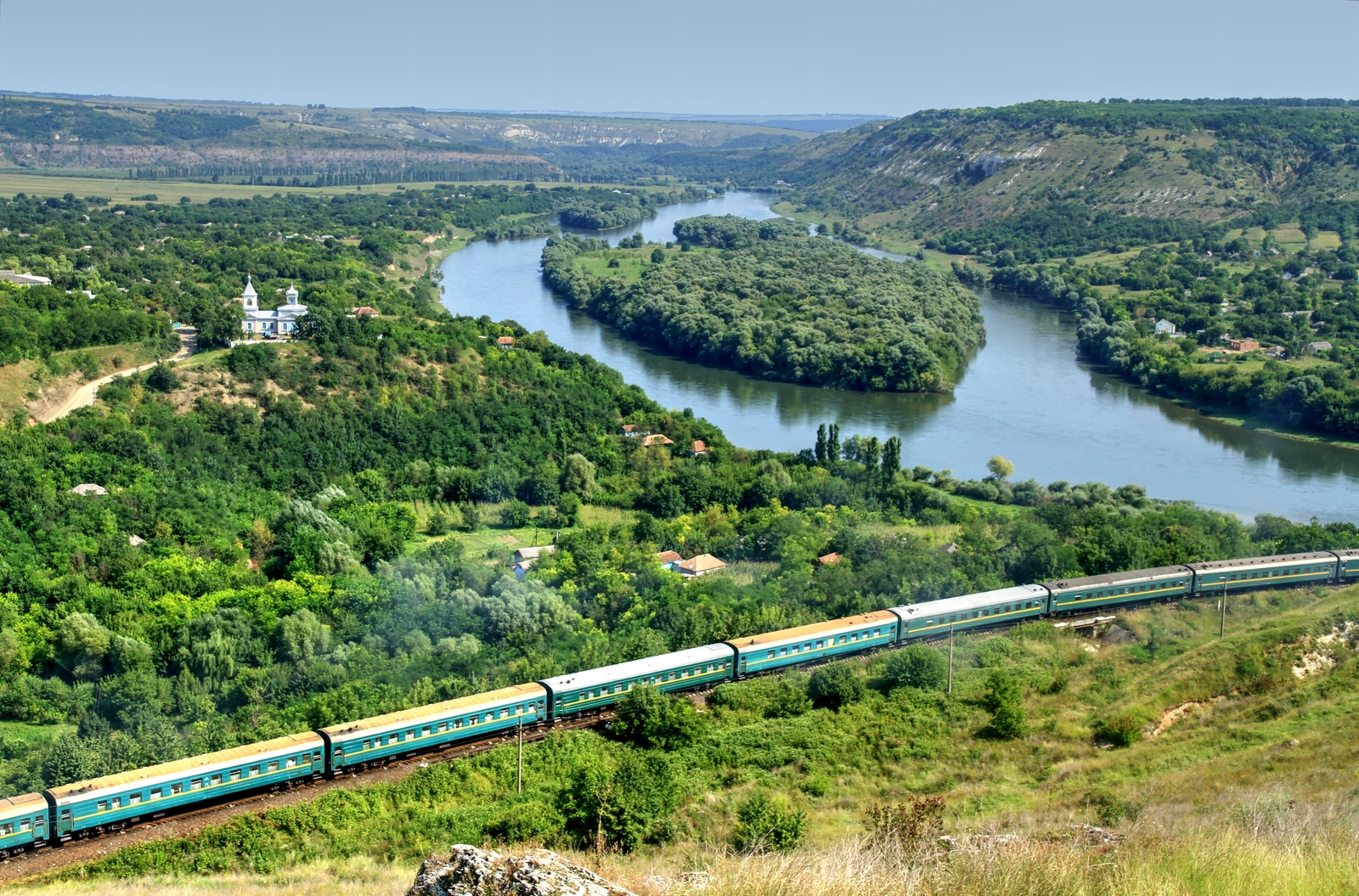
- Interactive map of Naslavcea
- Location in Moldova Location in Europe
- Coordinates: 48°28′N 27°35′E
- Country: Moldova
- District: Ocnița District

Population (2014 census)
  - Total: 782
- Time zone: UTC+2 (EET)
  - Summer (DST): UTC+3 (EEST)

Naslavcea is a village in Ocnița District and the northernmost point in Moldova. The village, situated along the Dniester river that separates Moldova and Ukraine, has an ethnic Ukrainian majority.

== 2022 Russian missile incident ==
On 31 October 2022, during the nationwide missile attacks in Ukraine, occurring during the Russian invasion, Russia launched a missile attack on a hydroelectric power plant, situated 10 kilometers north from the village, in Ukrainian territory. Debris of a missile, shot down by the Ukrainian forces, fell down in the territory of Moldova, near Naslavcea, causing damage to 21 households. For the first time since the beginning of the invasion, a third country would be affected by attacks, until Poland was hit by a missile only two weeks later. The Moldovan president, Maia Sandu, undertook a visit in Naslavcea on 3 November, where she criticized Russia for the actions. Sergiu Diaconu, Moldova's deputy interior minister, called the incident to be "an accident". The incident came three weeks after three Russian missiles flew over Moldova, violating Moldovan airspace.

== See also ==
- Extreme points of Moldova
