= Teleșeuca =

- Commune
- Location within Moldova
- Coordinates: 48.2788888889°N 27.8991666667°E
- Country: Moldova
- District: Dondușeni District

Population (2014)
  - Total: 636
- Time zone: UTC+2 (EET)
  - Summer (DST): UTC+3 (EEST)

Teleșeuca is a commune in Dondușeni District, Moldova. It is composed of two villages, Teleșeuca (formerly Teleșăuca Veche), and Teleșeuca Nouă (formerly Teleșăuca Nouă).
