= Pivniceni =

- Village
- Location within Moldova
- Coordinates: 48°16′50″N 27°31′34″E
- Country: Moldova
- District: Dondușeni District

Government
  - Mayor: Boris Lisenco (PDM)

Population (2014 census)
  - Total: 586
- Time zone: UTC+2 (EET)
  - Summer (DST): UTC+3 (EEST)
- Postal code: 5129

Pivniceni is a village in Dondușeni District, Moldova.
