= German Goldenshteyn =

Romanian-American klezmer musician

German Goldenshteyn, or Goldenshtayn (2 September 1934 – June 10, 2006) was a Romanian-born American klezmer musician.

Goldenshteyn was born to Avrom Z. and Khaya I. Goldenshteyn in the Bessarabian shtetl of Otaci, then in Romania, now in Moldova. He was a clarinetist and musicologist who brought his native region's klezmer tradition to the USA. In 1994 he arrived with nearly a thousand klezmer tunes that he had transcribed over the years.

Goldenshteyn was a featured performer in the Center for Traditional Music and Dance's Soviet Jewish project called "Nashi Traditsii" or "Our Tradition" between 1998 and 2002. He also appeared at workshops organised by the New England Conservatory of Music and Poland's Borderland Foundation.

"You felt it in his playing, in his presence, in his whole being, that he was a bridge to — a repository of — this entire culture," Michael Alpert, another klezmer musician and musicologist, told The New York Times. "He's the closest thing that the Klezmer revival has had to a Woody Guthrie or a Lead Belly."

He recorded a CD of his music in December 2005 at Klezkamp, backed up by a group of notable younger klezmorim. Another CD recorded separately is planned for release.

Goldenshteyn died of a heart attack in Long Island, New York in 2006. He was 71 years old.
