= Dondușeni, Dondușeni =

Dondușeni
- Village
- Location within Moldova
- Coordinates: 48.2244444444°N 27.5852777778°E
- Country: Moldova
- District: Dondușeni District

Government
  - Mayor: Ion Zloi (PCRM)

Population (2014 census)
  - Total: 1,532
- Time zone: UTC+2 (EET)
  - Summer (DST): UTC+3 (EEST)

Dondușeni is a village in Dondușeni District, in northern Moldova, with a population of 1,695 at the 2004 census.

At the 1930 census, the locality had a population of 1,568. It was part of Plasa Climăuți of Soroca County.

Ethnic composition
| Ethnic group | 1930 census | 2004 census |
| Moldovans | N/A | 1,622 |
| Romanians | 1,467 | 8 |
| Ruthenians (Ukrainians) | - | 34 |
| Russians | 80 | 21 |
| Jews | 14 | - |
| Poles | 6 | - |
| Gypsies | - | 5 |
| Bulgarians | - | 2 |
| Gagauzians | - | 1 |
| Hungarians | 1 | 2 |
| others | - | 2 |
| Total | 1,568 | 1,695 |

Native language
| Language | 1930 census | 2004 census |
| Romanian | 1,464 | N/A |
| Ukrainian | - | N/A |
| Russian | 88 | N/A |
| Yiddish | 14 | N/A |
| Polish | 1 | N/A |
| Hungarian | 1 | N/A |
| Total | 1,568 | 1,695 |
