= Rediul Mare =

- Village
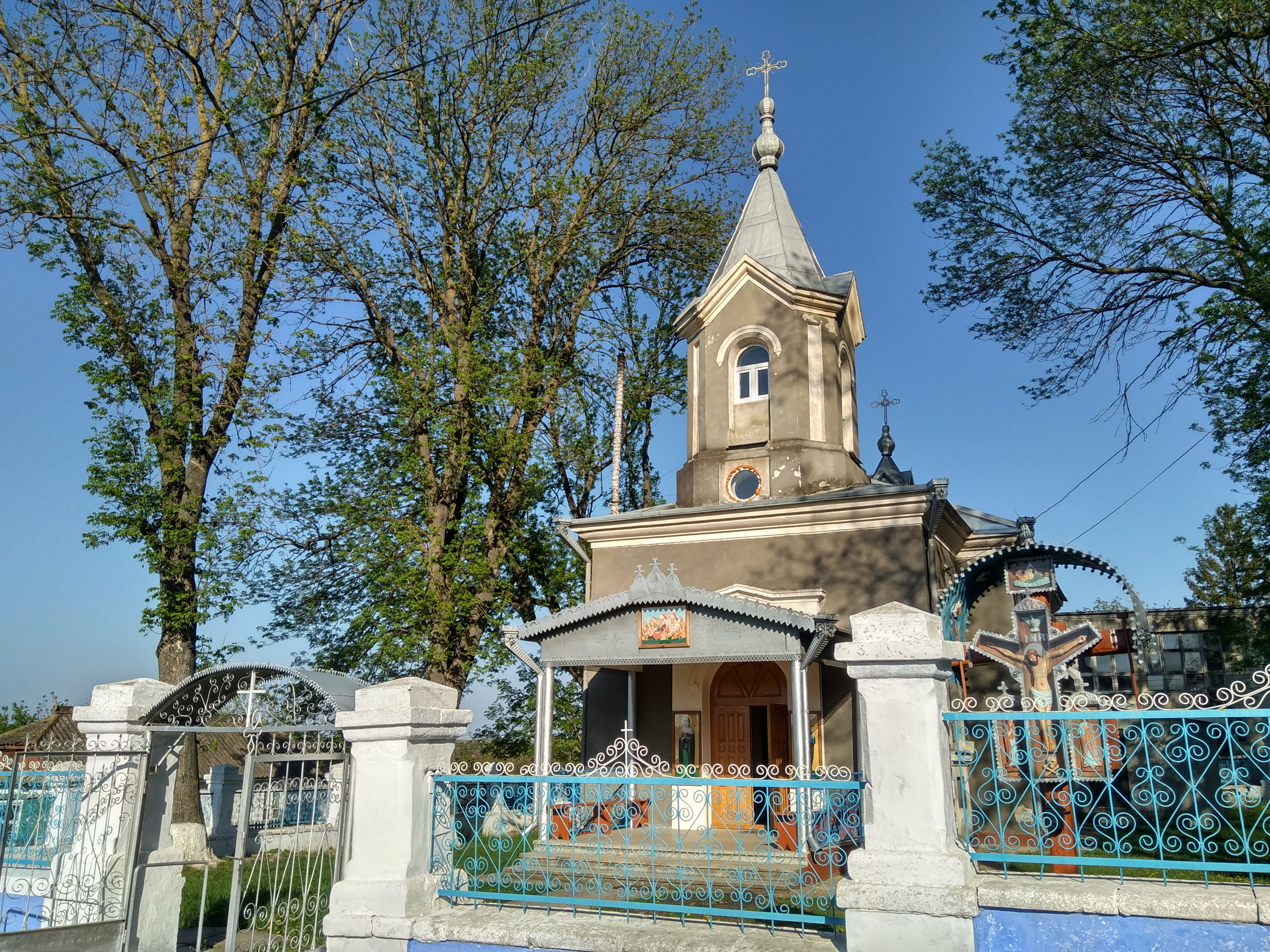
- Rediul Mare Church

- Location in Moldova
- Coordinates: 48°14′N 27°31′E
- Country: Moldova
- District: Dondușeni District

Population (2014 census)
  - Total: 920
- Time zone: UTC+2 (EET)
  - Summer (DST): UTC+3 (EEST)

Rediul Mare is a village in Dondușeni District, Moldova.

== Notable people ==
- Mihail Dolgan
