= Arcadie Gherasim =

Moldovan journalist

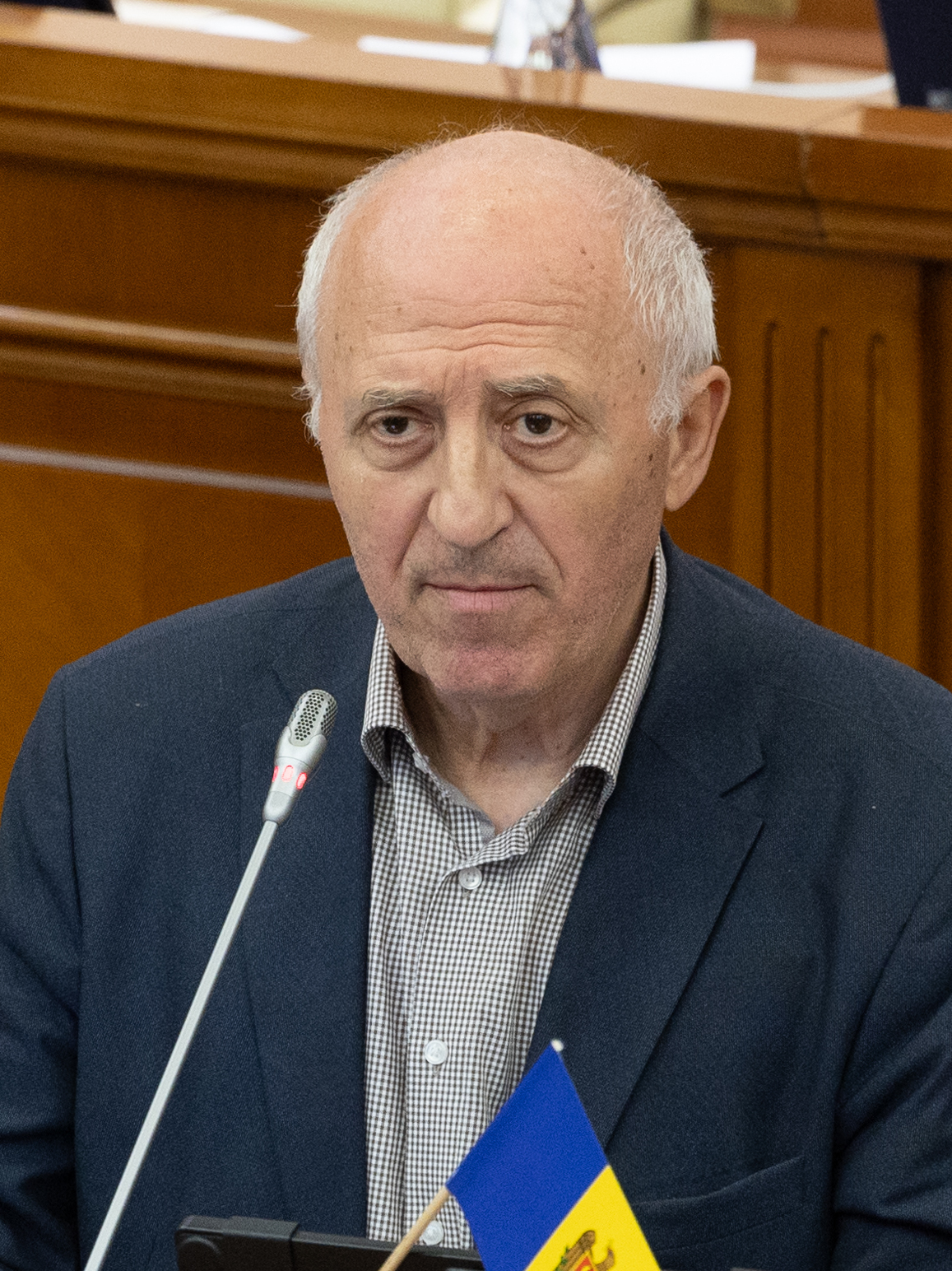
- Gherasim in 2024
- Born: 24 August 1957 (age 69); Crișcăuți, Moldavian SSR, Soviet Union
- Education: Moldova State University
- Occupation: Journalist
- Employer(s): Vocea Basarabiei; Timpul de dimineaţă TeleRadio-Moldova; Euro TV Moldova
- Known for: Journalistic activity

Arcadie Gherasim (born 24 August 1957) is a journalist from the Republic of Moldova. He was general director of Moldovan Public Television Moldova 1 and editor-in-chief of news programs for Radio Moldova. Arcadie Gherasim works for Vocea Basarabiei and Timpul de dimineaţă.

== Biography ==
Arcadie Gherasim was born on 24 August 1957. He was a reporter with TeleRadio-Moldova, as well as with Moldova's National Public Radio (1979–1986). Gherasim worked his way up in the company as departmental head, deputy editor-in-chief, and editor-in-chief of news programs for Radio Moldova. Between July 1999 and June 2000, he was general director of Moldovan Public Television, Moldova 1.

He is a deputy editor-in-chief of Timpul de dimineaţă, a major Moldovan newspaper. He is also the voice of Forum, a radio show on Radio Vocea Basarabiei. Gherasim also teaches economic journalism at the State University of Moldova. Between 2002 and 2006, he was a producer with Euro TV Moldova.
