= Arionești =

- Village
- Location in Moldova
- Coordinates: 48°23′N 27°51′E
- Country: Moldova
- District: Dondușeni District
- Established: 1463

Area
  - Total: 15 sq mi (39 km^{2})
- Elevation: 663 ft (202 m)

Population (2014 census)
  - Total: 1,291
  - Density: 86/sq mi (33/km^{2})
- Time zone: UTC+2 (EET)
  - Summer (DST): UTC+3 (EEST)
- Postal code: MD-5111
- Area code: +373 251

Arionești is a village in Dondușeni District, Moldova.

== Notable people ==
- Victor Pușcaș
