= Ciripcău =

- Village
- Location within Moldova
- Coordinates: 47.9833333333°N 28.3805555556°E
- Country: Moldova
- District: Florești District

Government
  - Mayor: Mihail Donos (PDM)

Population (2014 census)
  - Total: 1,077
- Time zone: UTC+2 (EET)
  - Summer (DST): UTC+3 (EEST)

Ciripcău is a village in Florești District, Moldova.
