= Crișcăuți =

- Village
- Location within Moldova
- Coordinates: 48.2663888889°N 27.8541666667°E
- Country: Moldova
- District: Dondușeni District

Government
  - Mayor: Alina Semeniuc (PCRM)

Population (2014 census)
  - Total: 1,092
- Time zone: UTC+2 (EET)
  - Summer (DST): UTC+3 (EEST)

Crișcăuți is a village in Dondușeni District, Moldova.
