= Frasin, Dondușeni =

Frasin
- Commune
- Location within Moldova
- Coordinates: 48.1383333333°N 27.5444444444°E
- Country: Moldova
- District: Dondușeni District

Population (2014)
  - Total: 1,706
- Time zone: UTC+2 (EET)
  - Summer (DST): UTC+3 (EEST)

Frasin is a commune in Dondușeni District, Moldova. It is composed of three villages: Caraiman, Codrenii Noi and Frasin (formerly Frasân).
