= Ion Druță =

Moldovan writer (1928–2023)

Ion Druță OR
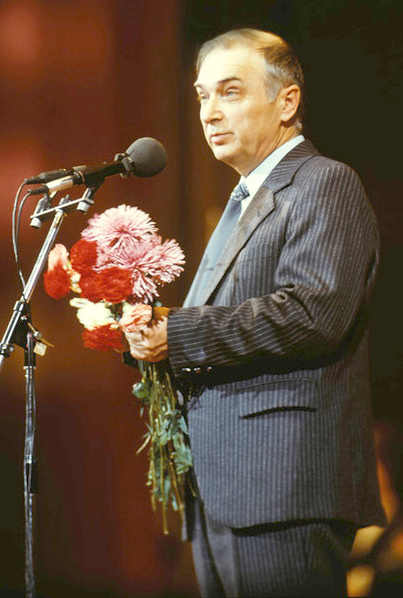
- Druță in 1988
- Born: 3 September 1928; Horodiște, Romania (now Moldova)
- Died: 28 September 2023 (aged 95); Moscow, Russia
- Resting place: Candle of Gratitude
- Occupations: Writer, poet, politician

People's Deputy of the Soviet Union
- In office 26 March 1989 – 26 December 1991

Personal details
- Party: Communist Party of the Soviet Union

Ion Druță (3 September 1928 – 28 September 2023), also known as Ion Drutse, was a Moldovan writer, poet, playwright and literary historian. He was an honorary member of the Romanian Academy.

== Biography ==
Ion Druță was born on 3 September 1928 in the village of Horodiște in what was then Soroca County in the Kingdom of Romania (now in Dondușeni District, Republic of Moldova). He graduated from the Forestry School and the Higher Courses of the Institute of Literature "Maxim Gorki" of the Union of Soviet Writers. From 1969, he lived in Moscow, Russia.

Druță's first short stories were published in the early 1950s. His works are considered to be part of the "gold fund" of contemporary national literature.

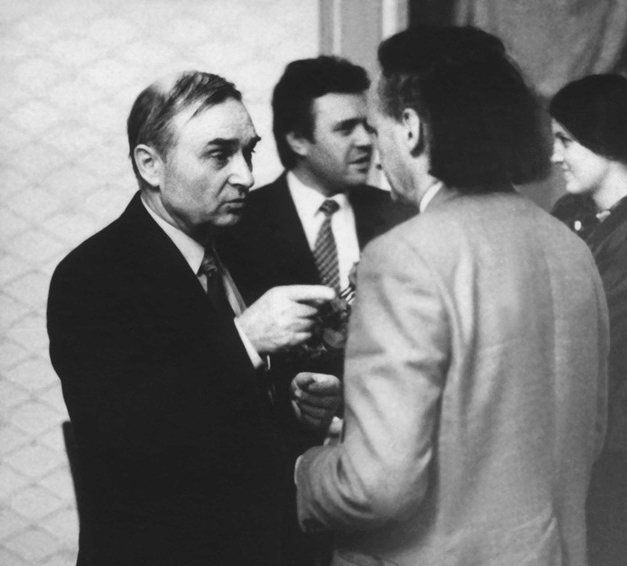
Druță talking to Grigore Vieru at the Moldovan embassy in Bucharest, in the 1990s

Druță died in Moscow on 28 September 2023, at the age of 95. His ashes were buried under the Candle of Gratitude, Soroca.

== Appreciations, distinctions, legality and criticism ==
From 1987, Ion Druță served as Honorary President of the Writers' Union of the Republic of Moldova, where he was unanimously elected to the General Assembly of Writers.

Druță was the honorary president of the Moldovan Writers' Union from 1987. He initially only wrote in Romanian, but wrote in Russian as well from 1960.

Druță was one of the leaders of the Romanian national movement in Moldova in the late 1980s and early 1990s. However, from the 1990s, his position in the ethno-linguistic controversy became more ambiguous and Moldovenist, being both criticised by the pro-Romanian media and organizations and praised by the pro-Russian ones for this stance.

== Works ==
=== Novels ===
- Frunze de dor
- Povara bunătății noastre
- Clopotnița
- Întoarcerea țărânii în pământ
- Biserica albă
- Păsările tinereții noastre (1971)
- Sania

=== In English ===
- Moldavian Autumn, various translators, University Press of the Pacific (2001) ISBN 0-89875-620-0

== Awards and honours ==
- Order of the Red Banner of Labor (8 June 1960, 16 November 1984)
- Order of Lenin (1988)
- Ordinul Republicii (1993)
- Laureat al Premiului de Stat al RSS Moldovenești pentru romanul “Balade din cîmpie” și nuvela “Ultima lună de toamnă” (1967).
- Scriitor al Poporului din RSS Moldovenească (1988)
- Membru de Onoare al Academiei Române (1990).
- Membru activ of the Academy of Sciences of Moldova (1992).
- Doctor Honoris Causa of the Moldova State University (1999).
- Laureat al Premiului de Stat al Republicii Moldova în domeniul literaturii (2008)

== See also ==
- Candle of Gratitude

== Gallery ==
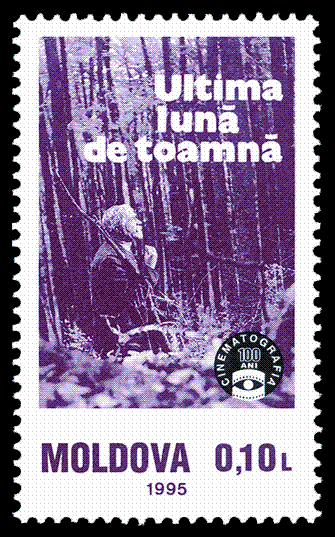
