= Otaci =

- Town
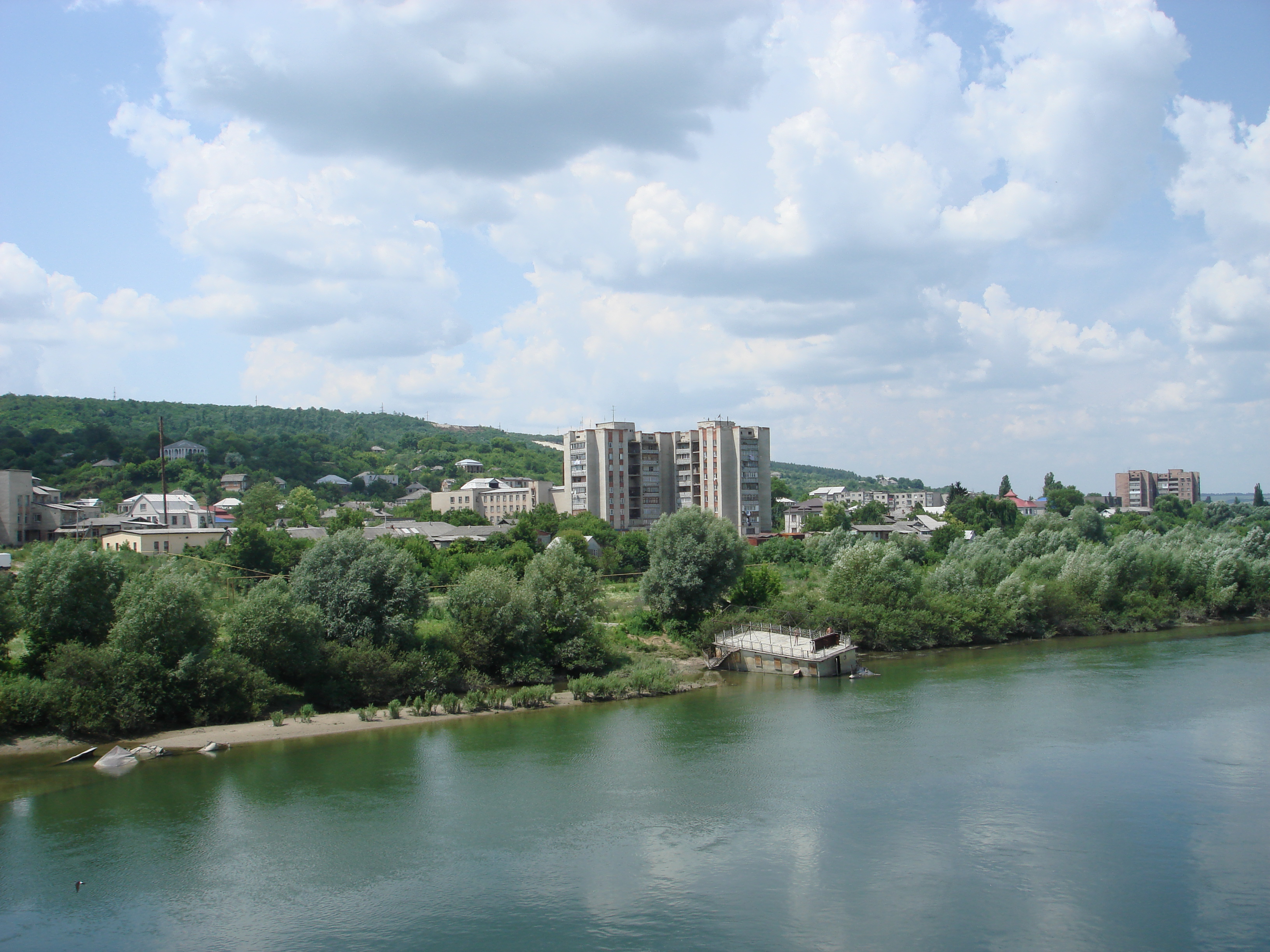
- Otaci as seen from the Ukrainian town of Mohyliv-Podilskyi, July 2006. The tower block in the foreground collapsed in 2019.

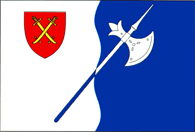
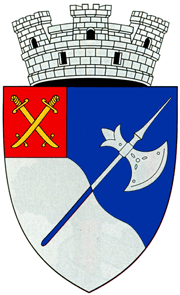
- Flag Coat of arms
- Interactive map of Otaci
- Location within Moldova
- Coordinates: 48°25′48″N 27°47′38″E
- Country: Moldova
- District: Ocnița District

Government
  - Mayor: Vasili Traghira (2015; PDM)

Area
  - Total: 3.8 km^{2} (1.5 sq mi)
- Elevation: 120 m (390 ft)

Population (2014)
  - Total: ▼6,043
- Time zone: UTC+2 (EET)
  - Summer (DST): UTC+3 (EEST)
- Postal code: MD-7106
- Area code: +373 271

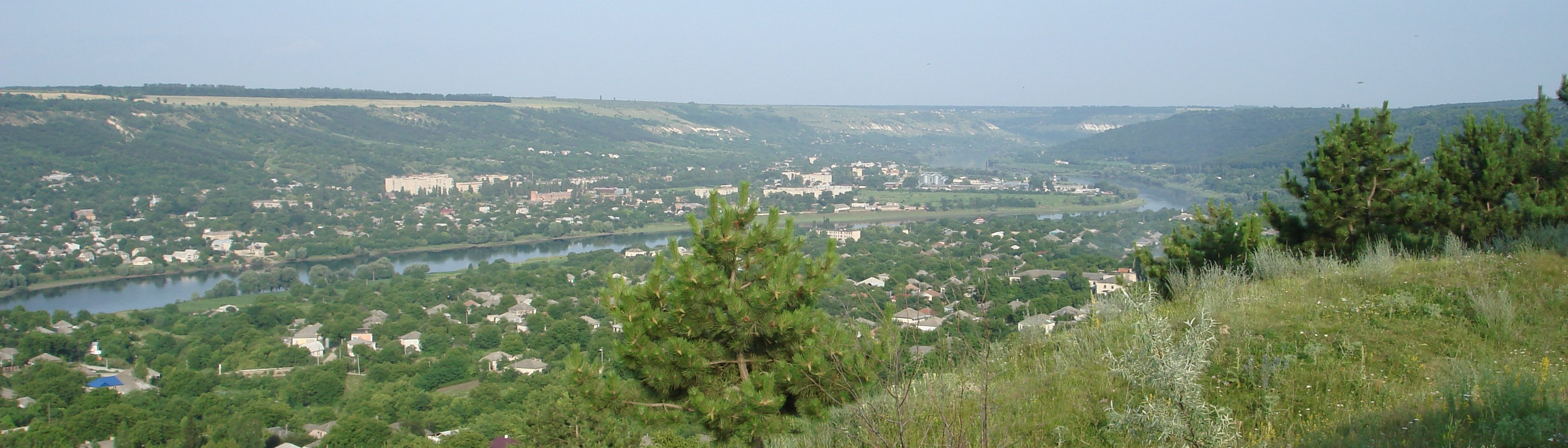
The Dniester near Otaci and Călărășeuca

Otaci (formerly Ataki) is a town (population 8,400) on the southwestern bank of the Dniester River, which at that point forms the northeastern border of Moldova. On the opposite side of the Dniester lies the Ukrainian city of Mohyliv-Podilskyi, and the two municipalities are connected by a bridge over the river. Otaci is located in Ocnița District. The town was sometimes referred to in older records as Mogilevskie Ataki to distinguish it from the other nearby town called Ataky or Ataki, which is near Khotyn.

== History ==
During the interwar period, Otaci was the seat of Plasa Otaci, in Soroca County, Romania. In 1940, as a consequence of the Molotov–Ribbentrop Pact, the Red Army entered Bessarabia and incorporated it into the Soviet Union. In 1991 Moldova became independent, and in 1994 Otaci achieved the status of oraș (town).

On 19 June 2019, Otaci was the site of an apartment building collapse. One of the 2 tower blocks in the town collapsed shortly after it was evacuated, leaving no one injured. It is believed that the building, when constructed in the 1970s, was built on muddy soil, and the foundations were damaged over the years.

== Notable people ==
- Samuel Bronfman, Canadian businessman and philanthropist
- Aaron Goodelman, American sculptor
- German Goldenshteyn, Romanian-born clarinetist
- Boris Holban, Franco-Romanian communist activist
- Samuil Lehtțir, Soviet Moldovan poet and literary critic
- Tully Filmus, American painter
