= Moșana =

- Commune
- Location within Moldova
- Coordinates: 48.3233333333°N 27.6891666667°E
- Country: Moldova
- District: Dondușeni District

Population (2014)
  - Total: 1,667
- Time zone: UTC+2 (EET)
  - Summer (DST): UTC+3 (EEST)

Moșana is a commune in Dondușeni District, Moldova. It is composed of two villages, Moșana and Octeabriscoe.
