= Ocnița =

- Town
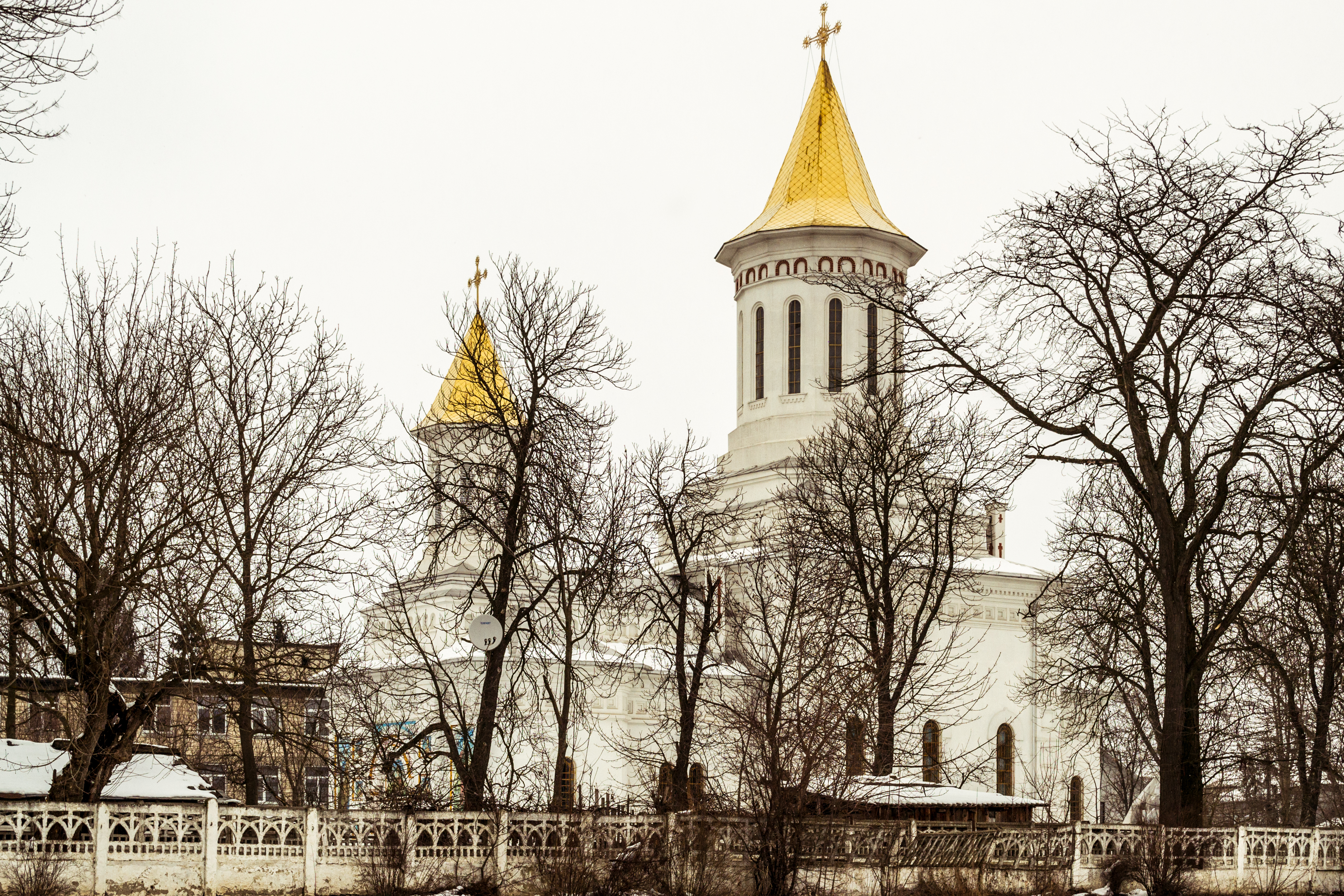
- Saint George church in Ocnița

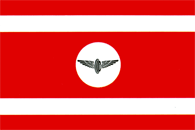
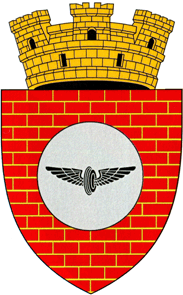
- Flag Coat of arms

- Location within Moldova
- Coordinates: 48°25′31″N 27°30′00″E
- Country: Moldova
- District: Ocnița District

Government
  - Mayor: Ion Ciumac (2015; PSRM)
- Elevation: 274 m (899 ft)

Population (2014)
  - Total: 7,254
- Time zone: UTC+2 (EET)
  - Summer (DST): UTC+3 (EEST)
- Climate: Dfb
- Website: ocnița.md

Ocnița (Romanian pronunciation: [ˈoknitsa]) is a town and the administrative center of Ocnița District in northern Moldova.

== History ==
Historical population
Year	Pop.	±%
1930	2,704	—
2014	7,254	+168.3%

According to the 1930 Romanian census, the population was 96.1% Romanian, 1.7% Russian, 0.81% Jewish, 0.44% Ukrainian and 0.37% Polish.

== Natives ==
- Ruslan Bolbocean (born 1974), diplomat
- Larisa Catrinici (born 1961), physician
