= Văscăuți =

- Commune
- Location within Moldova
- Coordinates: 47.9538888889°N 28.5102777778°E
- Country: Moldova
- District: Florești District

Population (2014)
  - Total: 990
- Time zone: UTC+2 (EET)
  - Summer (DST): UTC+3 (EEST)

Văscăuți is a commune in Florești District, Moldova. It is composed of three villages: Făgădău, Octeabriscoe, and Văscăuți.
