= Baraboi, Dondușeni =

Baraboi
- Village
- Location within Moldova
- Coordinates: 48°5′4″N 27°37′15″E
- Country: Moldova
- District: Dondușeni

Government
  - Mayor: Andrei Țurcan (PLDM)

Area
  - Total: 506 km^{2} (195 sq mi)

Population (2014 census)
  - Total: 3,084
- Time zone: UTC+2 (EET)
  - Summer (DST): UTC+3 (EEST)
- Postal code: MD-5112

Baraboi is a village in Dondușeni District, Moldova.
