= Commission for constitutional reform in Moldova =

The Commission for constitutional reform (Romanian: Comisia pentru reforma constituțională) is a commission instituted in Moldova by acting President Mihai Ghimpu to adopt a new version of the Constitution of Moldova (1994).

The commission for constitutional reform was set up under presidential decree (nr. 83) on 1 December 2009.

== Overview ==
The Venice Commission of the Council of Europe will decide whether or not the Republic of Moldova really needs to adopt a new Constitution or to amend the 1994 Main Law, in particular to revise the existing procedure of electing president of the republic.

According to Mihai Ghimpu, the new Constitution will be initially adopted by the Parliament by 50+ votes. A national referendum will be held afterward where the people will express their opinions on the new Constitution. The referendum took place by June 16, 2010.

The name of the official language will be also modified. According to Ghimpu, Romanian language must be the official language of Moldova. The possible constitutional reform will not cover the country's neutrality policy and the functioning of the state of law, Ghimpu added.

== Membership ==
President

- Mihai Ghimpu - President of the Moldovan Parliament

Secretary

- Ion Creangă - şef al Direcţiei juridice an Aparatului Parlamentului

Members:

- Vladimir Filat - Prime Minister of Moldova
- Serafim Urechean - prim-vicepreşedinte of the Parliament of Moldova
- Alexandru Stoianoglo - vicepreşedinte al Parlamentului
- Marian Lupu - preşedinte al Fracţiunii parliamentare a Democratic Party of Moldova
- Mihai Godea - preşedinte al Fracţiunii parliamentare a Liberal Democratic Party of Moldova
- Ion Hadârcă - preşedinte al Fracţiunii parliamentare a Liberal Party (Moldova)
- Veaceslav Untilă - preşedinte al Fracţiunii parliamentare a Partidului Party Alliance Our Moldova
- Ion Pleşca - preşedinte al Comisiei juridice, numiri şi imunităţi a Parlamentului
- Aurel Băieşu - vicepreşedinte al Comisiei juridice, numiri şi imunităţi a Parlamentului
- Valeriu Nemerenco - deputat în Parlament
- Alexandru Tănase - ministru al justiţiei
- Gheorghe Susarenco - viceministru al justiţiei
- Mihail Formuzal - Governor of Gagauzia (Gagauz-Yeri)
- Valeriu Zubco - Procuror General
- Alexandru Ohotnicov - şef interimar al Direcţiei generale an Aparatului Preşedintelui Republicii Moldova
- Victor Puşcaş - judecător la Curtea Constituţională
- Nicolae Timofti - membru al Consiliului Superior al Magistraturii
- Igor Dolea - membru al Consiliului Superior al Magistraturii
- Gheorghe Amihalachioaie -preşedinte al Consiliului Baroului Avocaţilor din Republica Moldova
- Dorin Chirtoacă -general mayor of Chişinău
- Alexandru Arseni - conferenţiar universitar, doctor în drept
- Gheorghe Avornic - professor universitar, doctor habilitat în drept
- Teodor Cârnaţ - conferenţiar universitar, doctor habilitat în drept
- Sergiu Cobăneanu - professor universitar, doctor în drept
- Marcel Cuşmir - conferenţiar universitar, doctor habilitat în drept
- Ion Guceac - professor universitar, doctor habilitat în drept
- Boris Negru - conferenţiar universitar, doctor în drept
- Nicolae Osmochescu - professor universitar, doctor în drept
- Victor Popa - professor universitar, doctor habilitat în drept
- Andrei Smochină - professor universitar, doctor habilitat în drept
- Sergiu Ţurcanu - conferenţiar universitar, doctor în drept
- Galina Bostan - director al Asociaţiei Obşteşti „Centrul pentru Analiza şi Prevenirea Corupţiei”
- Corneliu Gurin - expert juridic la Asociaţia Obştească „Agenţia pentru Susţinerea Învăţămîntului Juridic şi a Organelor de Drept „EX-LEGE”
- Igor Munteanu - director executiv al Asociaţiei Obşteşti „Institutul pentru Dezvoltare şi Iniţiative Sociale „Viitorul”
- Ştefan Urîtu - preşedinte al Comitetului Helsinki pentru Drepturile Omului din Republica Moldova
- Nicolai Buceaţchi - politolog.

On December 4, 2009, at the first meeting of the Constitutional Reform Commission of the Republic of Moldova it was created the Working Group research and analysis in the following composition:

- Victor Popa -president
- Ion Creangă – secretary

Membri:

- Alexandru Arseni
- Gheorghe Avornic
- Teodor Cârnaţ
- Serghei Cobăneanu
- Marcel Cușmir
- Ion Guceac
- Boris Negru
- Nicolae Osmochescu
- Andrei Smochină
- Sergiu Țurcanu
- Lilia Bordei
