= Ion Creangă (disambiguation) =

Ion Creangă (1837–1889) is a Romanian writer.

Ion Creangă may also refer to:

- Ion Creangă (jurist) (born 1962), Moldovan jurist
- Ion Creangă (politician) (born 1883), Bessarabian politician
- Ion Creangă, Neamț, a Romanian commune
- Ion Creangă State Pedagogical University of Chișinău
- Editura Ion Creangă, a book publisher

== See also ==
- Creangă (surname)
