= Constitution of Moldova (1994) =

Principles, institutions and law of political governance in Moldova

Overview
- Original title: Romanian: Constituția Republicii Moldova
- Jurisdiction: Moldova
- Ratified: 29 July 1994; 32 years ago
- Date effective: 27 August 1994; 32 years ago
- System: Unitary parliamentary republic

Government structure
- Branches: Three (executive, legislature and judiciary)
- Chambers: One
- Executive: President; Prime minister as head of government
- Judiciary: Supreme Court of Moldova, Constitutional Court
- Federalism: Unitary
- Electoral college: No
- Last amended: 2024
- Supersedes: Constitution of the Moldavian Soviet Socialist Republic

Full text
- Constitution of the Republic of Moldova at Wikisource

The Moldovan Constitution of 1994 has been the supreme law of the Republic of Moldova since 27 August 1994.

== Titles and chapters ==
- Title I – General Principles
- Title II – Fundamental Rights, Freedoms And Duties
- Chapter I – General Provisions
- Chapter II – Fundamental Rights And Freedoms
- Chapter III – Fundamental Duties
- Title III – Public Authorities
- Chapter IV – Parliament
- First Section – Structure And Functioning
- Second Section – The Status Of Parliament Members
- Third Section – Legislation And Acts Of Parliament
- Chapter V – the President Of The Republic Of Moldova
- Chapter VI – the Government
- Chapter VII – The parliament – the Government Interrelationship
- Chapter VIII – Public Administration
- Chapter IX – Judicial Authority
- First Section – Courts Of Law
- Second Section – The Higher Magistrates' Council
- Third Section – The Public Prosecution Office
- Title IV – National Economy And Public Finance
- Title V – Constitutional Court
- Title VI – Revising The Constitution
- Title VII – Final And Transitory Provisions

== See also ==
- 2024 Moldovan European Union membership constitutional referendum
- 2010 Moldovan constitutional referendum
- Commission for constitutional reform in Moldova
- Constitution of Moldova (1978)
- Constitution of Moldova (1941)
