= 1941 Moldavian Supreme Soviet election =

An election for a Supreme Soviet took place in Moldavia on January 12, 1941. The poll was an effort to legitimize the Soviet occupation of Bessarabia and Northern Bukovina which had taken place after Romania agreed to evacuate its administration in June 1940. Since 1918 these regions had been annexed by Romania, however the Soviet Union had maintained an active claim. All 266 deputies returned were elected on the common list of the Communist Party of Moldavia (a branch of the Communist Party of the Soviet Union) and non-partisans. The Supreme Soviet subsequently adopted the 1941 Constitution of the Moldavian Soviet Socialist Republic, under which the MSSR was a constituent of the Soviet Union. Soviet control was interrupted by the Axis occupation from June 1941 to 1944.

== Results ==
Moldavian deputies represented 56% of the total, while they made up 65% of the population of the republic. The first session of the Supreme Soviet was held on February 8, 1941.

== Follow-up ==
The Constitution of 1941 was adopted at the first session of the Supreme Soviet on February 10, 1941. It was the first Constitution of Moldova, and was based on the principles and provisions of the 1936 Soviet Constitution. The Moldavian SSR had been formed on August 2, 1940. It included parts of the annexed territories and part of the Moldavian Autonomous Soviet Socialist Republic from within the Ukrainian SSR.

== See also ==
- 1940 Lithuanian parliamentary election
- 1940 Latvian parliamentary election
- 1940 Estonian parliamentary election
