= Creangă (surname) =

Creangă is a surname common in Romania and Moldova. Used alone, it may refer to any of the following:

- Ion Creangă, Romanian writer and schoolteacher
- Ion Creangă (politician), Bessarabian politician
- Ion Creangă (jurist), Moldovan jurist
- Horia Creangă, Romanian architect, grandson of the writer
- Șerban Creangă, Romanian director

== See also ==
- Ion Creangă, Neamț, a Romanian village
- Ion Creangă, a defunct Romanian magazine
- Ion Creangă Children's Theatre, a Romanian theatrical institution
- Ion Creangă National College, an educational institution in Romania
- Ion Creangă Pedagogical State University, an educational institution in Moldova
- Editura Ion Creangă, a defunct Romanian publishing house

== See also ==
- Creanga River (disambiguation)
