= Constitution of Moldova =

Supreme law of Moldova

Constitution of Republic of Moldova

Overview
- Original title: (in Romanian) Constituția Republicii Moldova
- Jurisdiction: Moldova
- Ratified: 29 July 1994; 32 years ago
- Date effective: 27 August 1994; 32 years ago
- System: Unitary parliamentary republic

Government structure
- Branches: Three (executive, legislature and judiciary)
- Chambers: One
- Executive: President; Prime minister as head of government
- Judiciary: Constitutional Court; Supreme Court of Justice
- Federalism: Unitary
- Electoral college: No
- Last amended: 2024
- Supersedes: Constitution of the Moldavian Soviet Socialist Republic

The current Constitution was adopted on 29 July 1994 by the Moldovan Parliament and represents the supreme law of Moldova. It came into force on 27 August 1994 and has since been amended 10 times.

The Constitution established the Republic of Moldova as a sovereign state, independent and neutral; a state of law governed by a set of principles including the separation and cooperation of powers, political pluralism, human rights and freedoms, observance of International Law and International Treaties. It delineates the formation and function of the state's main institutions: Parliament, Cabinet, President and Judiciary.

== Moldavian ASSR Constitution (1925) ==
The draft text of the Moldavian ASSR Constitution was developed by the Codification department of the People's Commissariat for Justice of the Ukrainian Soviet Socialist Republic and on 8 December 1924 was submitted for approval to the Commission of responsible workers from that department. In February 1925, the People's Commissariat for Justice of the Ukrainian SSR submitted the draft text to the Council of People's Commissars of the Ukrainian SSR which approved it and sent it to Moldova for consideration. On 23 April 1925, five months after the formation of the Moldavian ASSR, the first Moldavian Congress of Soviets unanimously approved the republic's first constitution – the fundamental law of the Moldavian ASSR.

== Moldavian ASSR Constitution (1938) ==
The constitution was adopted on 6 January 1938 by the Seventh Extraordinary Congress of the Supreme Council of the Moldavian SSR. It was based on the principles of the 1936 Constitution of the Soviet Union. The achievements of the Moldovan people in economy and culture served as a trigger for the creation of the Constitution. All of these achievements were reflected in the document.

The 1938 Constitution consisted of 11 chapters and 114 articles. The first chapter was devoted to the social structure of the Moldovan autonomy, and the second to its internal structure. The third chapter of the Constitution dealt with the highest bodies of government, the fourth - with the republican governing bodies; the fifth - with local government bodies; the sixth - with the budget of the MASSR; the seventh - with the activities of the judiciary and the prosecutor's office. The eighth chapter established the basic rights and obligations of citizens. The ninth chapter regulated the rules concerning the electoral system. The tenth chapter established state symbols (coat of arms, flag) of the Moldavian ASSR. The final chapter delineated the procedure for changing the Constitution.
