= Raisa Apolschi =

Moldovan politician and jurist

Judge of the Constitutional Court
- In office 14 December 2018 – 26 June 2019
- Preceded by: Victor Popa

Member of the Moldovan Parliament
- In office 28 December 2010 – 14 December 2018
- Succeeded by: Eleonora Graur
- Parliamentary group: Democratic Party

Personal details
- Born: 23 February 1964 (age 62) Chișinău, Moldavian SSR, Soviet Union
- Party: Democratic Party

Raisa Apolschi (born 23 February 1964) is a Moldovan politician and jurist, who served a deputy in the Parliament of Moldova from the Democratic Party of Moldova (PDM) from 2010 to 2019. She is president of the "Legal, Appointments and Immunities" parliamentary committee and a member of the National Political Council of PDM.

== Career ==
Between 1989 and 1994, Apolschi worked as a judge in the Sectorul Ciocana Court in Chișinău. From 1994 to 2003 and again from 2009 to 2010, she worked as a lawyer, being a member of the Union of Lawyers from the Republic of Moldova. In the period 2003–2008, she worked as a Parliamentary Lawyer, Director of the Center for Human Rights of the Republic of Moldova.

Apolschi was elected deputy in the 2010 parliamentary election and re-elected in November 2014, where she ranked 14th in the list of PDM candidates. As of 14 December 2018, she was a judge at the Constitutional Court of Moldova. In November 2018, she supported the appointment of Octavian Armașu as governor of the National Bank of Moldova.

== Personal life ==
Apolschi is a widow and has one child.
