= Constantinești =

Constantineşti may refer to several villages:

- Constantineşti, Goteşti Commune, Cantemir district, Moldova
- Constantineşti, Râmnicelu Commune, Brăila County, Romania
- Constantineşti, in the town of Scorniceşti, Olt County, Romania
