= Constitution of 1978 =

Constitution of 1978 may refer to:

- 1978 Constitution of the People's Republic of China
- Russian Constitution of 1978
- Spanish Constitution of 1978
- Constitution of the Moldavian SSR (1978)
