= Pavel Barbalat =

Moldovan jurist and judge (1935–2004)

Pavel Barbalat OR
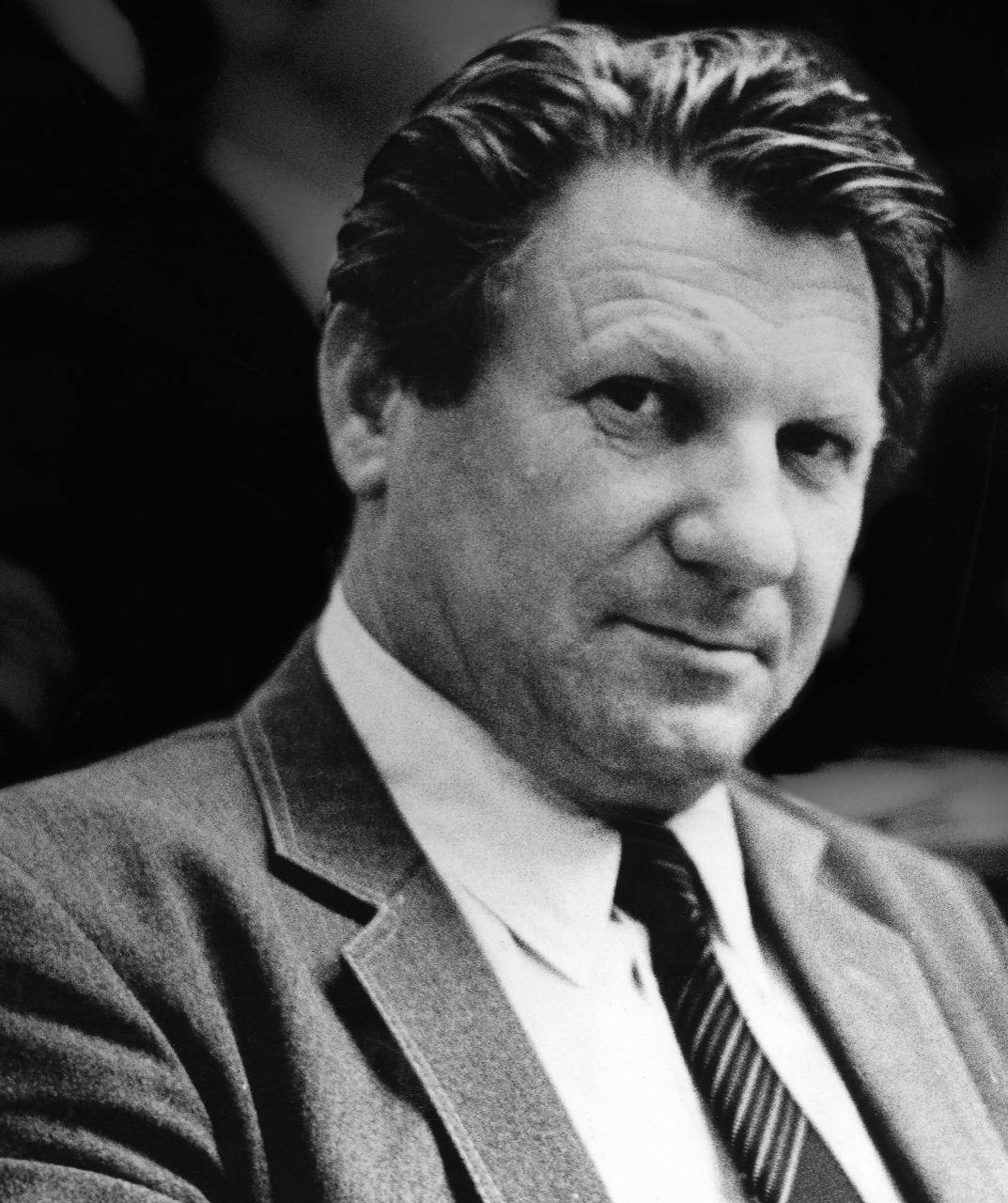
- Barbalat in 1979

1st President of the Constitutional Court
- In office 23 February 1995 – 23 February 2001
- Succeeded by: Victor Pușcaș

Judge of the Constitutional Court
- In office 23 February 1995 – 23 February 2001

Personal details
- Born: 29 May 1935 Cioburciu, Moldavian ASSR, Ukrainian SSR, Soviet Union
- Died: 11 April 2004 (aged 68) Chișinău, Moldova
- Education: Moldova State University

Pavel Barbalat (29 May 1935 – 11 April 2004) was a Moldovan jurist and judge. He was the first President of the Constitutional Court of Moldova.

== Family ==
Father – Andrei Ivanovich Barbalat (1904–1992) was a participant in the Great Patriotic War (1941–1945). He was awarded the medals: "For Battle Merit" (twice), "For the Liberation of Warsaw", "For the Capture of Königsberg", "For the Capture of Berlin", and "For the Victory over Germany in the Great Patriotic War 1941–1945". In 1985, he was awarded the Order of the Patriotic War, 2nd class. He served as chairman of a collective farm, head of the village council, and postmaster.

Mother – Nadezhda Fomovna Barbalat, homemaker.

== Presidential Election in the Republic of Moldova (2000) ==
In the 2000 election, the political coalition Alliance for Democracy and Reforms nominated and registered Pavel Barbalat as a candidate for the presidency. These were the first presidential elections held after constitutional amendments were adopted in 2000, according to which the president of the republic was elected by a parliamentary vote. This procedure remained in effect until March 4, 2016.

On November 24, 2000, the Central Committee Plenum of the Party of Communists of the Republic of Moldova (PCRM) nominated the party’s chairman and head of its parliamentary faction, Vladimir Voronin, as its presidential candidate. Pavel Barbalat was supported by the leaders of the other parliamentary factions, including Dumitru Diacov, Mircea Snegur, Vladimir Matei, and Iurie Roșca.
