= Stela Procopciuc =

Moldovan judge

Acting president of the Supreme Court of Moldova
- Incumbent
- Assumed office 11 March 2024
- Preceded by: Aliona Miron (acting)

Stela Procopciuc is a Moldovan judge. She has been the acting president of the Supreme Court of Moldova since 2024.

== Career ==
Procopciuc worked as the Deputy Prosecutor at the Fălești District Prosecutor's Office. She later served as a judge at the Bălți Court of Appeal since 2007 and, since 2021, as its acting vice-president. At the end of 2023, the Vetting Committee nominated her as a candidate for judge of the Supreme Court of Moldova.

On 7 March 2024 the High Council of the Judiciary appointed her as acting president of the Supreme Court, and she took office on 11 March, replacing Alina Miron, who stepped down as acting president after being appointed to the High Council. She was appointed judge of the Supreme Court in June 2024.
