= Creanga River =

Creanga River may refer to:

- Creanga, a tributary of the river Brad in Romania
- Creanga Mică, a tributary of the river Târnava Mare in Romania
- Creanga Mare, a tributary of the river Târnava Mică in Romania

== See also ==
- Creangă (surname)
