= Domnica Manole =

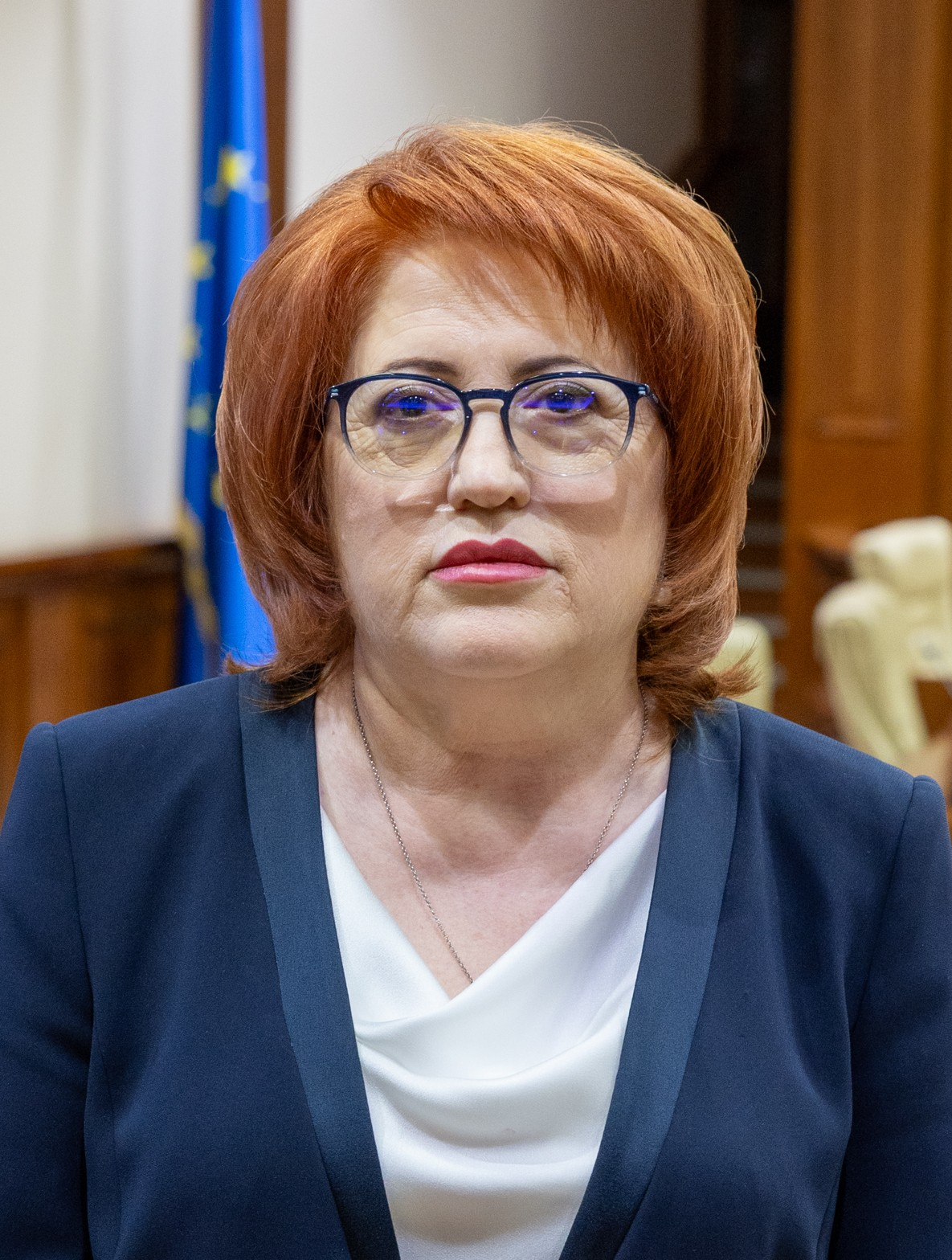
- Manole in 2025

President of the Constitutional Court
- Incumbent
- Assumed office 10 November 2023
- Preceded by: Nicolae Roșca
- In office 23 April 2020 – 25 April 2023
- Preceded by: Vladimir Țurcan
- Succeeded by: Nicolae Roșca

Judge of the Constitutional Court
- Incumbent
- Assumed office 16 August 2019

Personal details
- Born: 4 June 1961 (age 65) Bașcalia, Moldavian SSR, Soviet Union
- Education: Moldova State University

Domnica Manole (born 4 June 1961) is a Moldovan judge. She has served as the President of the Constitutional Court of Moldova since April 2020.
