= Aurel Băieșu =

Moldovan jurist and politician

Aurel Băieşu

Judge of the Constitutional Court
- In office 5 April 2013 – 26 June 2019

Moldovan Ambassador to Italy
- In office 6 December 2011 – 22 April 2013
- President: Marian Lupu (acting); Nicolae Timofti
- Prime Minister: Vladimir Filat
- Preceded by: Gheorghe Rusnac
- Succeeded by: Stela Stîngaci

Judicial Advisor to the President
- In office 1 April 2011 – 6 December 2011
- President: Marian Lupu (acting)

Member of the Moldovan Parliament
- In office 14 August 2009 – 28 November 2010
- Parliamentary group: Democratic Party

Personal details
- Born: 19 July 1964 (age 62) Chișinău, Moldavian SSR, Soviet Union
- Party: Democratic Party; Alliance for European Integration (2009–present)
- Education: Moldova State University; M. V. Lomonosov Moscow State University

Aurel Băieşu (born 19 July 1964) is a Moldovan jurist and politician, former deputy to the Parliament of the Republic of Moldova and deputy chairman of the Parliamentary Commission, Appointments and Immunities from August 2009 to December 2010.

== Biography ==
Aurel Băieşu was born on 19 July 1964 in the city of Chișinău, Moldavian SSR, USSR (today in the Republic of Moldova). In 1986 he graduated from the State University of Moldova - the faculty of Law. He obtained a PhD degree in law at "M.V. Lomonosov" State University in Moscow (1990); doctor habilitat in Law at the State University of Moldova (2012). Between 1990 and 1993, he was lecturer at the Civil Law Chair of the State University of Moldova, and since 1994 has been a lecturer at the Chair of International Law and Law of Foreign Economic Relations at the Faculty of Law of the State University of Moldova. Between 1994 and 2005 he was the head of the International Law Chair and the Law of Foreign Economic Relations at the Faculty of Law of the State University of Moldova. From April 2013 to June 2019 he was a judge at the Constitutional Court.

Between August 2009 and December 2010, he was deputy to the Parliament of the Republic of Moldova, deputy chairman of the Legal Parliamentary Commission, appointments and immunities. From April 2011 to January 2012 he was a legal advisor to the Interim President of the Republic of Moldova.

On 6 December 2011 he was appointed as Ambassador of Republic of Moldova to the Italian Republic.
