= Victor Pușcaș =

Moldovan politician (1943–2023)

Victor Pușcaș OR
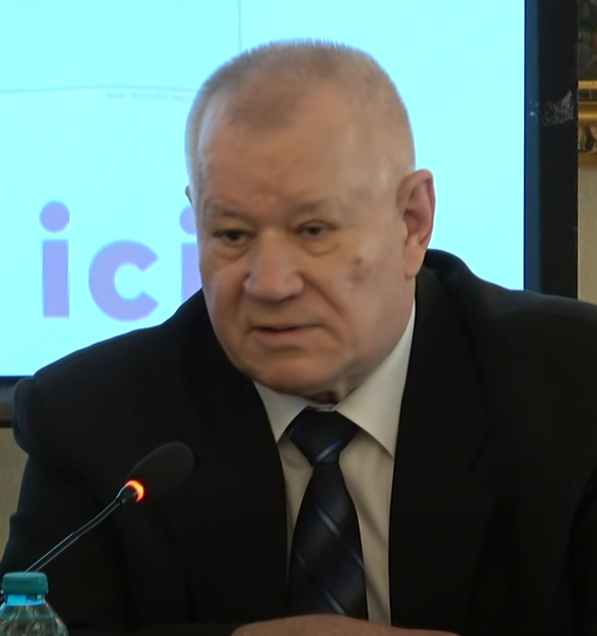
- Pușcaș in 2019

President of the Constitutional Court
- In office 15 February 2001 – 15 February 2007
- Preceded by: Pavel Barbalat
- Succeeded by: Dumitru Pulbere

Judge of the Constitutional Court
- In office 15 February 2001 – 25 February 2013

1st President of the Supreme Court of Justice
- In office 24 February 1995 – 15 February 2001
- Succeeded by: Valeria Șterbeț

Minister for Parliamentary Relations
- In office 5 April 1994 – 24 February 1995
- President: Mircea Snegur
- Prime Minister: Andrei Sangheli

Vice President of the Moldovan Parliament
- In office 6 June 1990 – 27 February 1994
- President: Mircea Snegur
- Prime Minister: Mircea Druc; Valeriu Muravschi; Andrei Sangheli

Member of the Moldovan Parliament
- In office 10 March 1990 – 27 February 1994
- Constituency: Dondușeni

Personal details
- Born: 18 July 1943 Arionești, Romania (now Moldova)
- Died: 22 June 2023 (aged 79) Chișinău, Moldova
- Party: Communist Party of the Soviet Union
- Education: Moldova State University

Victor Pușcaș (18 July 1943 – 22 June 2023) was a Moldovan politician.

Pușcaș served as a member of the Parliament of Moldova (1990–1994), Minister for Relations with Parliament (1994–1995), Chairman of the Supreme Court of Justice of Moldova (1995–2001), President of the Superior Council of Magistrates (1998–2001) and Chairman of the Constitutional Court of Moldova (2001–2007).

Pușcaș died on 22 June 2023, at the age of 79.
