= Iurie Apostolachi =

Moldovan politician (born 1960)

Member of the Moldovan Parliament
- In office 17 February 2011 – 9 December 2014
- Preceded by: Alexandru Tănase
- Parliamentary group: Liberal Democratic Party

Personal details
- Born: 19 June 1960 (age 65) Varniţa
- Party: Liberal Democratic Party; Alliance for European Integration (2010–present)

Iurie Apostolachi (born 19 June 1960) is a politician from Moldova. He has served as a member of the Parliament of Moldova since 2011.
