= Rădeni, Călărași =

Rădeni
- Village
- Location within Moldova
- Coordinates: 47.3961111111°N 28.2105555556°E
- Country: Moldova
- District: Călărași District

Government
  - Mayor: Constantin Scurtu (PLDM)

Population (2014 census)
  - Total: 1,519
- Time zone: UTC+2 (EET)
  - Summer (DST): UTC+3 (EEST)

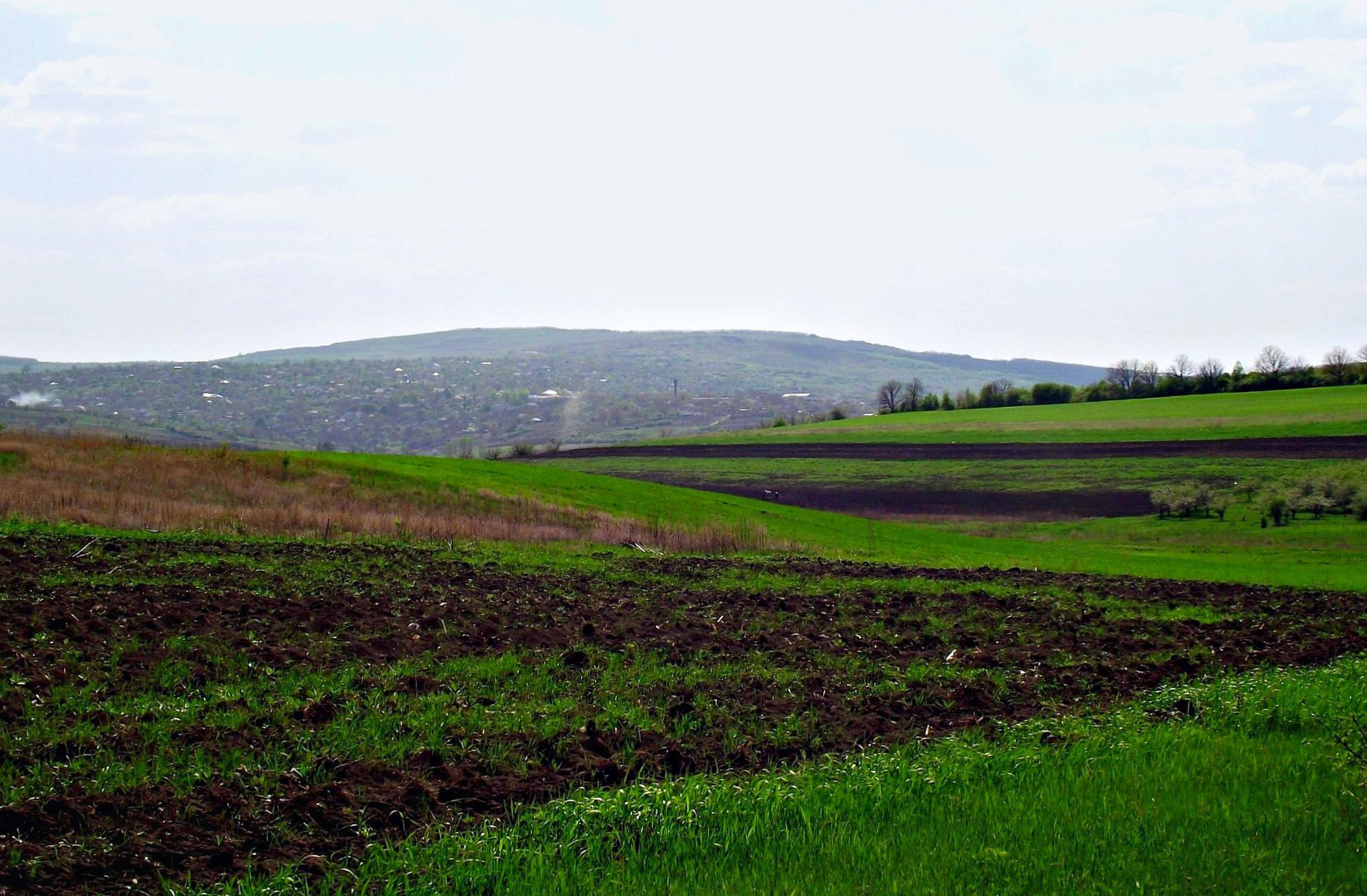
Radeni village

Rădeni is a village in Călărași District, Moldova.

== Notable people ==
- Nicolae Roșca (born 1962), jurist and judge
