= Dumitru Pulbere =

Moldovan jurist

Dumitru Pulbere OR
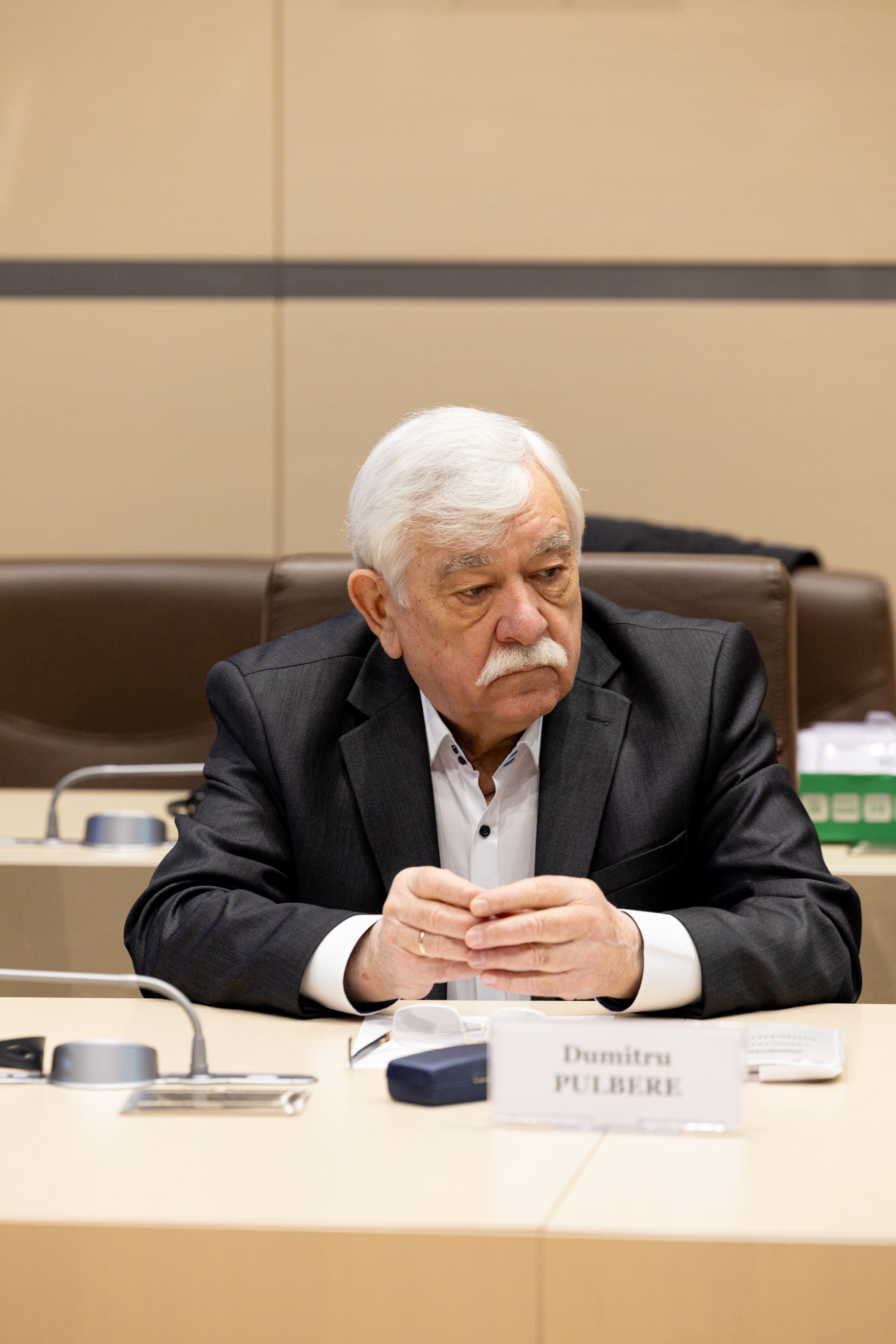
- Pulbere in 2024

President of the Constitutional Court
- In office 1 March 2007 – 28 September 2011
- Preceded by: Victor Pușcaș
- Succeeded by: Alexandru Tănase

Judge of the Constitutional Court
- In office 15 February 2001 – 15 February 2013

Member of the Moldovan Parliament
- In office 16 June 1998 – 15 February 2001
- Preceded by: Mihai Petrache
- Parliamentary group: For a Democratic and Prosperous Moldova Electoral Bloc

Personal details
- Born: 22 February 1952 (age 74) Năvîrneț, Moldavian SSR, Soviet Union

Dumitru Pulbere (born 22 February 1952) is a Moldovan jurist. He previously served as judge and President of Moldova's Constitutional Court. He was also elected as Member of the Moldovan Parliament in the late 1990s.
