= Victor Popa =

Moldovan politician (1949–2020)

Judge of the Constitutional Court
- In office 29 March 2013 – 14 December 2018
- Succeeded by: Raisa Apolschi

Member of the Moldovan Parliament
- In office 28 December 2010 – 29 March 2013
- Succeeded by: Vadim Vacarciuc
- Parliamentary group: Liberal Party

Personal details
- Born: 15 April 1949 Poiana, Boghenii Noi
- Died: 15 November 2020 (aged 71)
- Party: Liberal Party; Alliance for European Integration (2009–2020)

Victor Popa (15 April 1949 – 15 November 2020) was a Moldovan politician.

== Career ==
He was a member of the Parliament of Moldova from 2010 until 2013, when he was named a Justice of the Constitutional Court of the Republic of Moldova.
