= Nicolae Roșca =

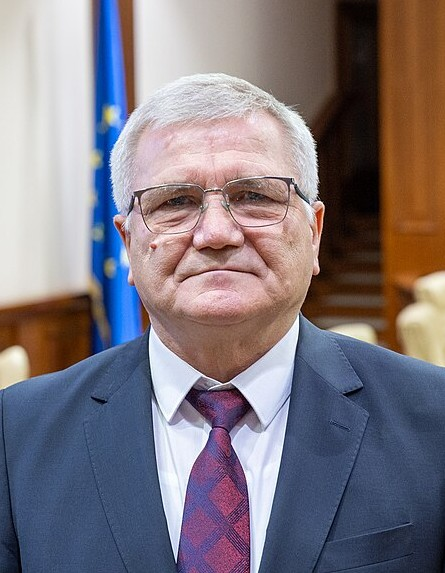
- Roșca in 2025

Judge of the Constitutional Court
- Incumbent
- Assumed office 15 August 2019

President of the Constitutional Court
- In office 25 April 2023 – 9 November 2023
- Preceded by: Domnica Manole
- Succeeded by: Domnica Manole

Personal details
- Born: 10 August 1962 (age 64) Rădeni, Moldavian SSR, Soviet Union
- Education: University of Bucharest; Moldova State University

Nicolae Roșca (born 10 August 1962) is a Moldovan jurist and judge. He has served as a judge of the Constitutional Court of Moldova since 2019. In April 2023, he was appointed President of the Constitutional Court of Moldova.
