= Tudor Panțîru =

Moldovan judge and politician (born 1951)

Tudor Panțîru OR
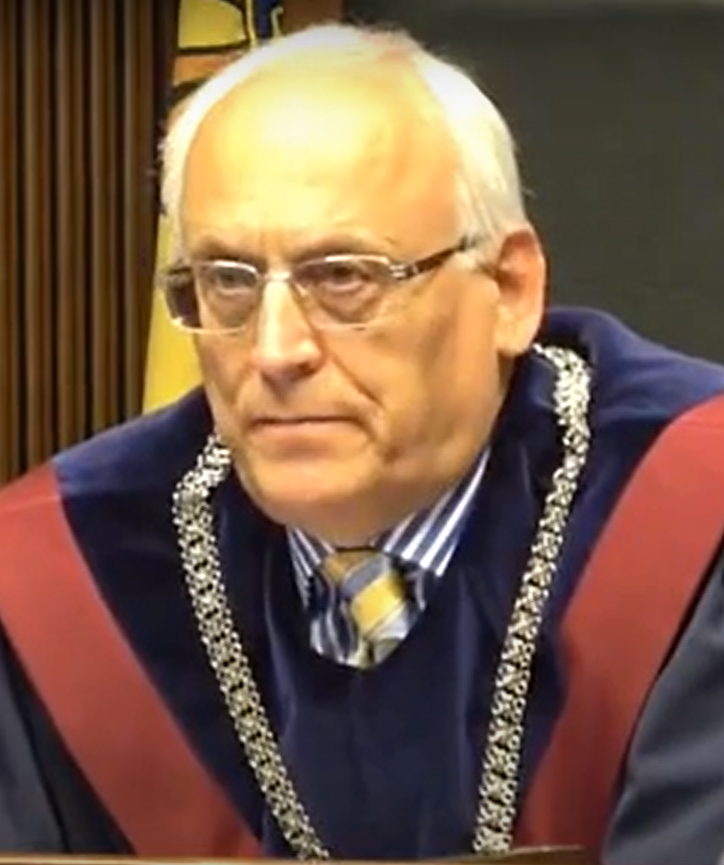
- Panțîru in 2017

President of the Constitutional Court
- In office 12 May 2017 – 31 January 2018
- Preceded by: Alexandru Tănase
- Succeeded by: Mihai Poalelungi

Judge of the Constitutional Court
- In office 22 February 2013 – 31 January 2018
- Succeeded by: Mihai Poalelungi

Member of the Chamber of Deputies of Romania
- In office 11 December 2008 – 10 December 2012
- Parliamentary group: Social Democratic Party

1st Permanent Representative to the United Nations
- In office 25 May 1992 – 3 October 1996
- President: Mircea Snegur
- Prime Minister: Valeriu Muravschi; Andrei Sangheli
- Succeeded by: Ion Botnaru

Member of the Moldovan Parliament
- In office 17 April 1990 – 25 May 1992
- Constituency: Dondușeni

Personal details
- Born: 26 October 1951 (age 74) Baraboi, Moldavian SSR, Soviet Union
- Party: Social Democratic Party (Romania)
- Education: Moldova State University
- Occupation: Judge, politician

Tudor Panțîru (born 26 October 1951) is a Moldovan and Romanian judge, politician and diplomat, former President of the Constitutional Court of Moldova, and former international judge of the Constitutional Court of Bosnia and Herzegovina (2002–2021).

== Biography ==
He was born in Baraboi, at the time in the Moldavian Soviet Socialist Republic, Soviet Union (now in Dondușeni District, Moldova). Panțîru graduated in Law at Moldova State University. In 1977-1980 he worked as a lawyer, in 1980–1987 as a judge and then as President of the Frunze District Court in Chișinău in 1987–1990. In the last two years he also chaired Moldova's commission for the appointment and promotion of judges. From 1990 to 1994 he served as Member of Parliament of the independent Republic of Moldova, chairing the parliament's legal committee in 1990–92. In 1992 he was appointed ambassador of Moldova to the United Nations. In 1996, he was chosen as judge from Moldova at the European Court of Human Rights (ECtHR) in Strasbourg.

In 2001 Panțîru moved to Romania; he currently lives in Bucharest.

In June 2002 he was appointed by the ECtHR President as international judge of the Constitutional Court of Bosnia and Herzegovina and he took up the office in September 2002. From May 2003 until June 2006 he served as the Vice-President Court. He will retire at age 70 in 2021. Since April 2002 he has also been serving as international judge at the Supreme Court of Kosovo, and since April 2005 he is the International Presiding Judge of the Special Chamber of the Supreme Court of Kosovo.

From December 2008 to 2012 he was elected to the Chamber of Deputies of Romania for the Social Democratic Party. He thus resigned from his position of international judge in Kosovo. He chaired the parliamentary committee monitoring the enforcement of ECtHR judgments. During the same period, he was also appointed a member of the Parliamentary Assembly of the Council of Europe, sitting in its Committee on Legal Affairs and Human Rights.

Since 2013 Panțîru is a judge of the Constitutional Court of Moldova, and on 12 May 2017 he has been elected as President of the Constitutional Court, for a three-year term.

He published numerous texts in journals "Legea și Viața" and "Avocatul Poporului" from Chișinău. He also wrote "The Protection of Refugees under the ECHR" in the book "Jurisprudence of the International Legal Institutions in Refugee Matters", edited by UNHCR BO in Moldova, Chișinău, 2000.
