= Varnița, Anenii Noi =

Varnița
- Commune
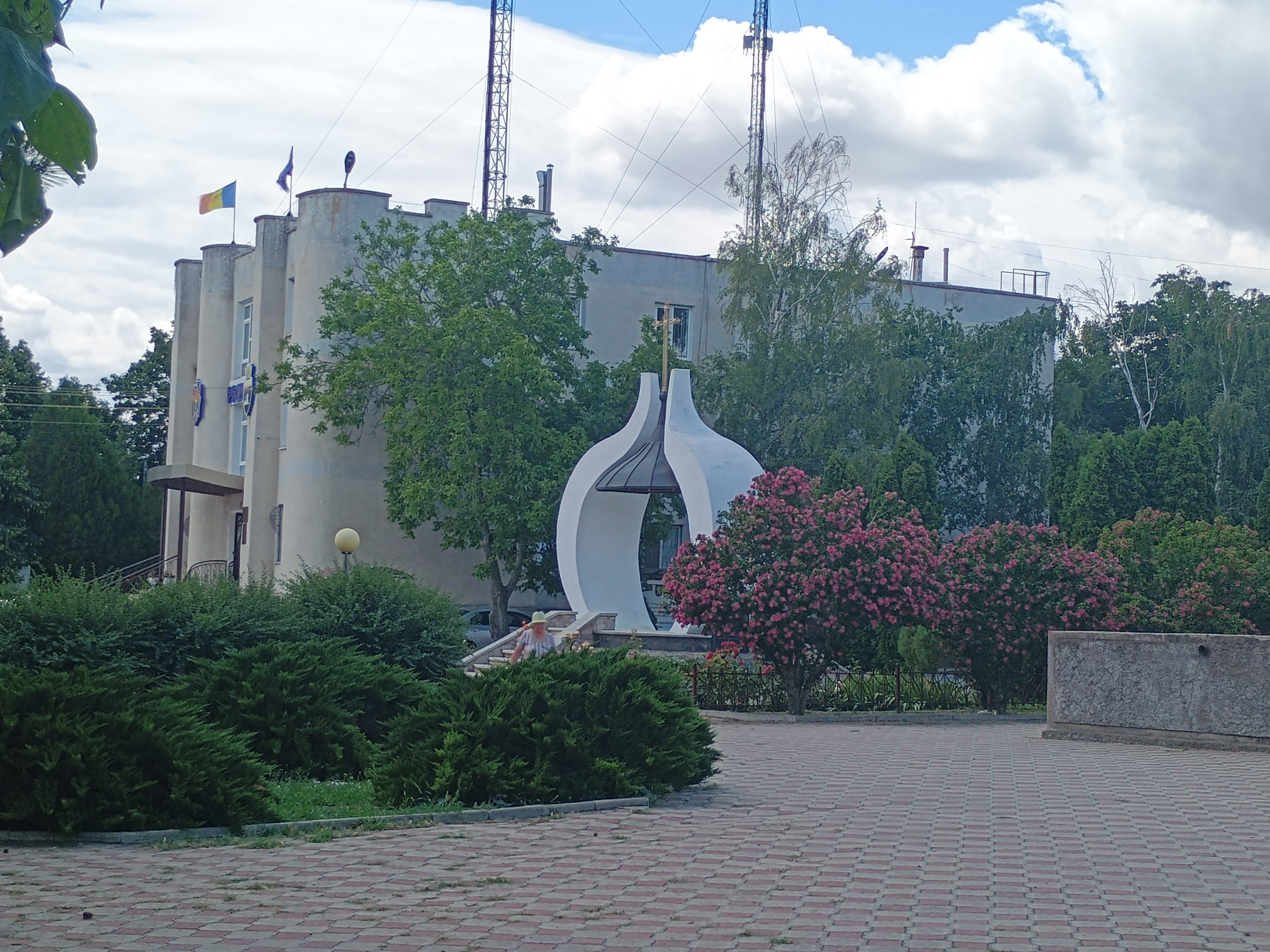
- Town hall

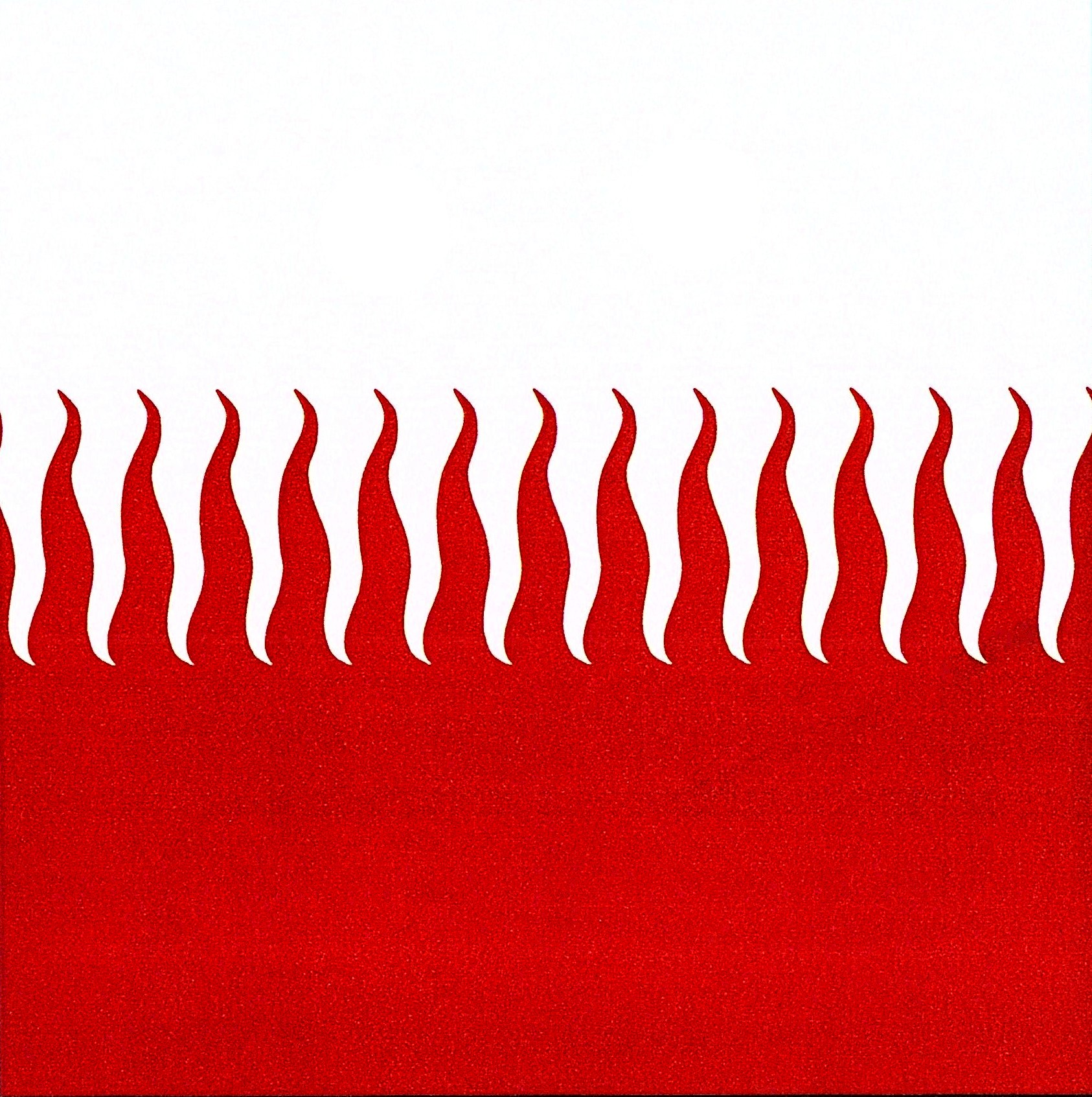
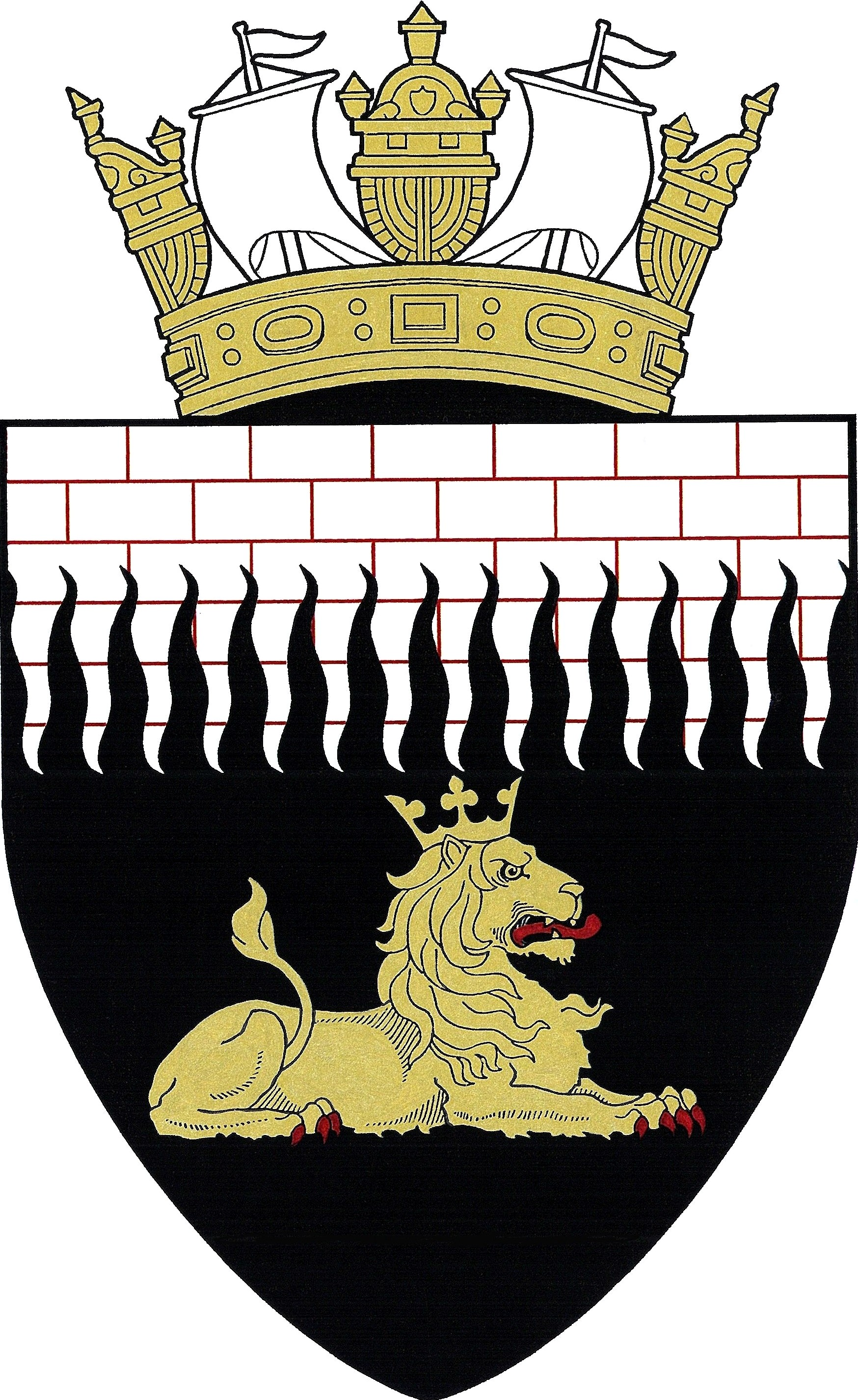
- Flag Seal
- Interactive map of Varnița
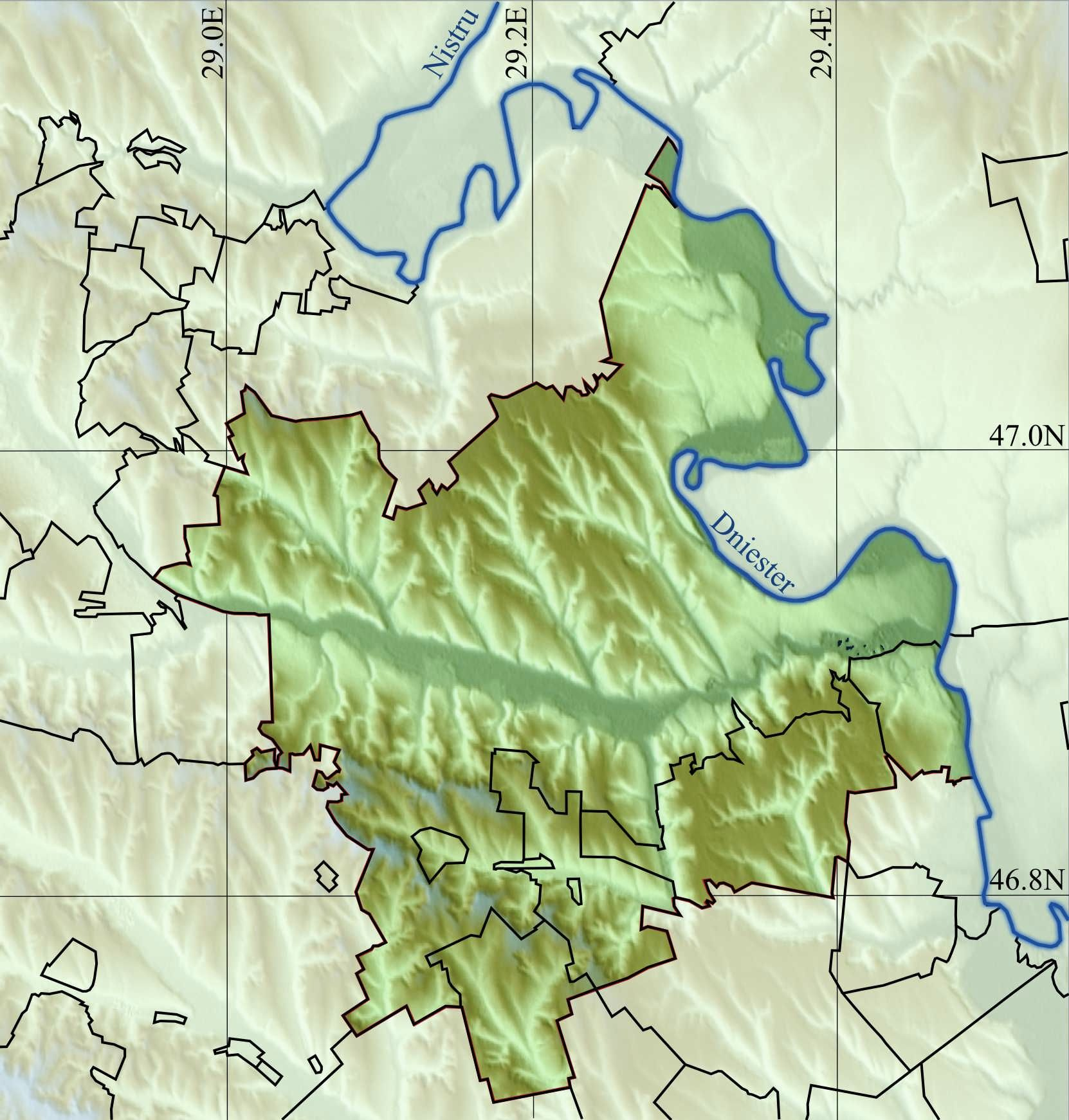
- Location within Anenii Noi District Location within Moldova
- Coordinates: 46°52′N 29°28′E
- Country: Republic of Moldova
- County: Anenii Noi

Government
  - Mayor: Alexandr Nichitenco

Population (2014 census)
  - Total: 5,105
- Time zone: UTC+2 (EET)
  - Summer (DST): UTC+3 (EEST)
- Area code: +373 265
- Website: varnita.md

Varnița is a village in the Anenii Noi District, in south-eastern Moldova, located near Bender (Tighina). It is also considered a suburb of Bender.

After the 1992 War of Transnistria, Varnița remained under the effective sovereignty of the Republic of Moldova, while the city of Bender is controlled by the breakaway authorities of Transnistria.

== History ==
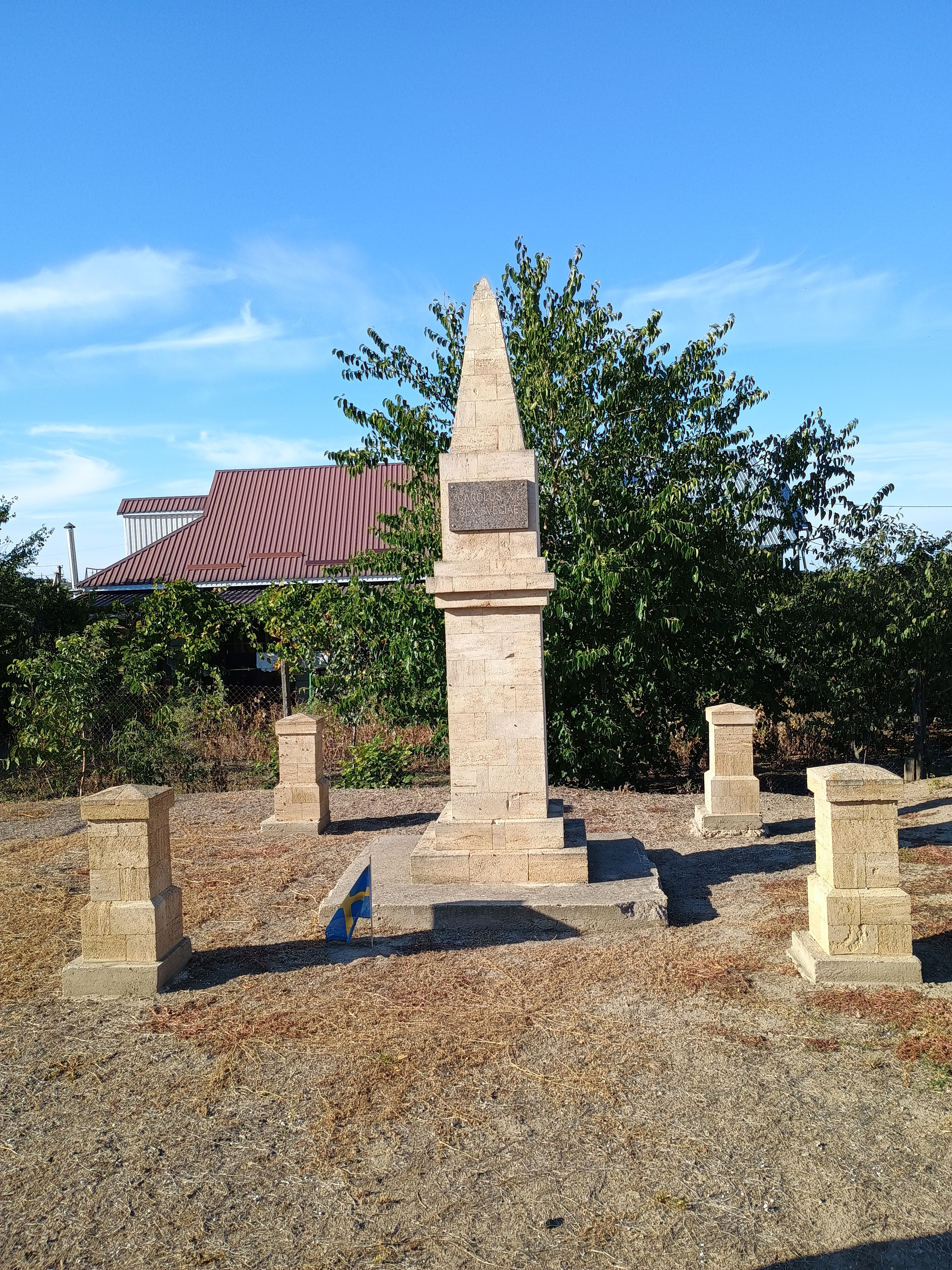
Obelisk to King Charles XII of Sweden

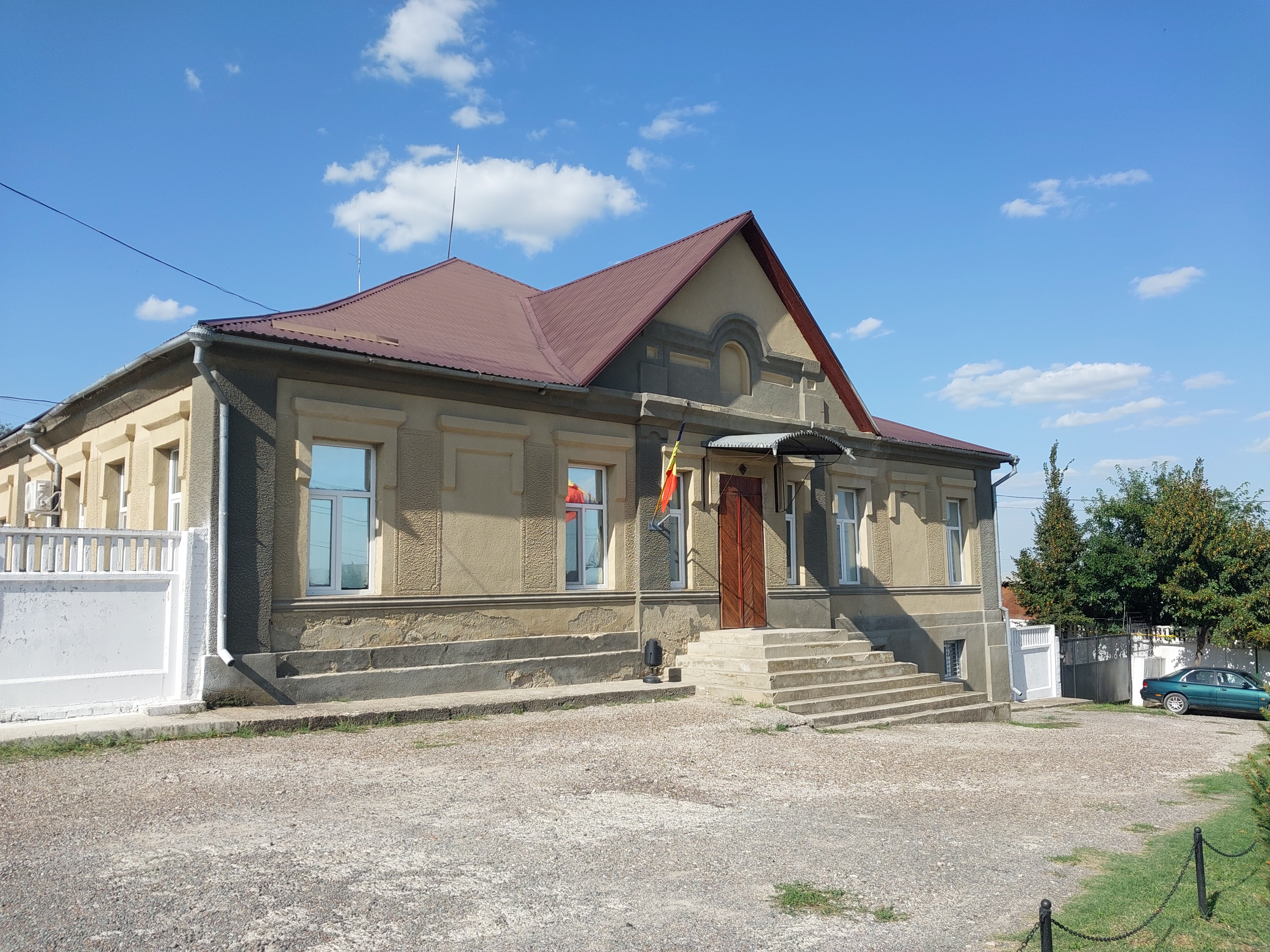
The old school building, dating from the 19th century.

The first mention of the village comes from the company of Sultan Suleiman the Magnificent in a firman directed to Hasan, a bey of Akkerman and the Sandžak. It mentions that according to information provided by Moldovan voivode Alexandru Lăpușneanu, bandits who had committed murders and robberies had found shelter in Varnița or Varnigea near Bender. There is a hypothesis according to which the town was established immediately after the creation of Bender in 1538.

=== The Second Stockholm ===
After losing the battle of Poltava, Swedish King Charles XII lived in the village in 1709–1713. The king set up a military camp in here which was called the Second Stockholm. The settlement included his Cossack and Moldavian allies, notably among whom was Ivan Mazepa, who died in Varnița. In 1925, at the request of the Swedish authorities, a memorial obelisk was erected here. A separate monument commemorates the figure of Mazepa.

In 2016, the remains of the palace of Charles XII were found in the village.

== Territorial dispute between Moldova and Transnistria ==
The leaders of Transnistria claim Varnița as being part of the Pridnestrovian Moldavian Republic, but the attempts of Transnistrian authorities to take control of the village have failed to date. This conflict likely stems from Varnița being a port on the Dniester River, and began in 2006.

In 2006, the parties announced their willingness to settle the dispute in court, and the authorities in Transnistria announced that until the verdict was handed down, the control of port infrastructure should be exercised by the mainly Russian soldiers stationed in Transnistria since 1992. After the soldiers entered Varnița, the United States Embassy in Chișinău became interested in the case, calling for the return of the port of Moldova. The European Union also called on both sides to calm and de-escalate the conflict. Finally, a Moldovan court stated that the port was the property of local authorities. The incident around the port was artificially blown up by both parties, both possessing a key interest in keeping international organizations involved in the conflict over Transnistria. In 2013, another border incident occurred in the village, when residents destroyed border checkpoints built by Transnistria in response to the Moldovan announcement of erecting such points in the security zone. That same year, the president of Transnistria, Evgeni Shevchuk, by decree unilaterally announced the extension of the Transnistria borders to include Varniţa.

== Demographics ==
Historical population
Year	Pop.	±%
1930	2,704	—
2004	4,210	+55.7%
2014	5,105	+21.3%

According to the 2004 Moldovan census, there were 4,210 inhabitants, 3,390 of which were ethnic Moldovans, 454 Russians, 228 Ukrainians, 50 Roma, 35 Bulgarians, 15 Gagauzes, 1 Jew, 1 Pole, and 36 other/undeclared.

According to the 1930 Romanian census, the population was 94.8% Romanian, 3.7% Russian and 1.16% Jewish.

== Notable people ==
- Iurie Apostolachi (born 1960), politician
