= Tănase v. Moldova =

Decided 27 April 2010
- Full case name: Case of Tănase v. Moldova
- ECLI: ECLI:CE:ECHR:2010:0427JUD000000708
- Chamber: Grand Chamber

Court composition
- President; Peer Lorenzen

Tănase v. Moldova was a 2010 European Court of Human Rights case which determined that the provisions of the European Convention on Human Rights prohibited Moldova from making dual cititzenship holders ineligible to sit in the national parliament.

== Background ==
In May 2008, Moldovan electoral law was amended to forbid persons with multiple citizenship from sitting in the parliament. The change did not forbid those with multiple citizenship from running for election, but if successful, they could only take their seat if they renounced their other citizenships. According to Radio Free Europe, 10 percent of candidates in the 2009 Moldovan parliamentary election held dual nationality.

One of those affected Alexandru Tănase, from the Liberal Democratic Party of Moldova. Having been elected in 2009, he was forced to renounce his Romanian citizenship if he wished to take his seat.

He launched a complaint before the Court. Romania was admitted as a third party.

== Judgments ==
In 2008, a Chamber of the Court decided that the provisions of Moldovan law violated Article 3 of Protocol No. 1 of the European Convention on Human Rights. The judgment was appealed by Moldova.

In 2010, the Grand Chamber unanimously found the ineligibility of persons with dual citizenship to violate Article 3 of Protocol No. 1. It was unanswered whether forbidding those with multiple nationalities from taking seats in Parliament pursued a legitimate aim.

It found the law to be disproportionate and in violation of Article 3 of Protocol No. 1.

== See also ==
- Moldova–Romania relations
- Controversy over linguistic and ethnic identity in Moldova
