= Constitution of the Moldavian Soviet Socialist Republic (1941) =

The Constitution of the Moldavian Soviet Socialist Republic (1941) was the communist state constitution and fundamental law of the Moldovan SSR, adopted in 1941.

== History ==
The Constitution of 1941 was adopted soon after the 1941 Moldavian SSR elections. The Constitution was adopted at the first session of the Supreme Soviet of the Moldavian SSR, on February 10, 1941. It was based on the principles and provisions of the 1936 Soviet Constitution.

Moldovan deputies represented 56% of the total number of representatives, although the titular ethnicity made up 65% of the republic's population.

The Constitution was superseded by a new one in 1978.
