= Alexandru Arseni =

Moldovan politician (born 1952)

Alexandru Arseni OR

Member of the Chișinău Municipal Council
- In office 23 May 1999 – 25 May 2003

Member of the Moldovan Parliament
- In office 17 April 1990 – 29 March 1994
- Parliamentary group: Popular Front
- Constituency: Cahul

Personal details
- Born: 30 August 1952 (age 73) Prigorodnoye, Kazakh SSR, Soviet Union (now Kazakhstan)
- Party: Popular Front of Moldova

Alexandru Arseni (born 30 August 1952) is a Moldovan politician.

== Biography ==
Alexandru Arseni is a representative politician in the history of Moldova.
