= Supreme Court of Justice of Moldova =

Highest court in the Republic of Moldova

- Curtea Supremă de Justiție a Republicii Moldova
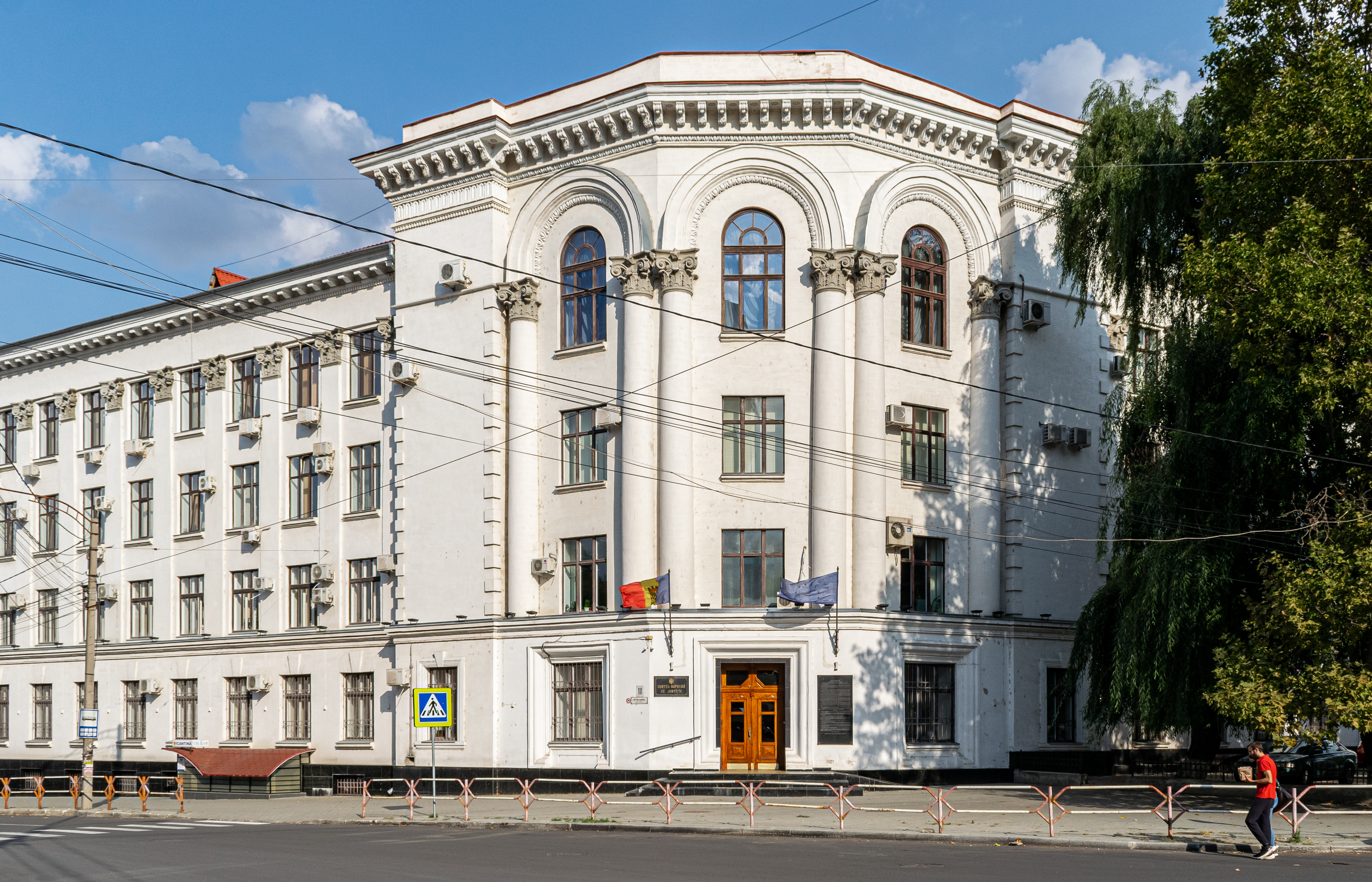
- Headquarters in Chișinău
- Established: 26 March 1996
- Location: Chișinău
- Authorised by: Constitution of Moldova
- Number of positions: 48
- Language: Romanian
- Website: csj.md

President
- Currently: Stela Procopciuc (acting)
- Since: 11 March 2024

The Supreme Court of Justice of Moldova (Romanian: Curtea Supremă de Justiție a Republicii Moldova, CSJ) is the highest court in the Republic of Moldova that ensures the correct and uniform application of legislation by all courts of law, settlement of litigation arisen in the process of applying laws, guarantees the state’s responsibility to citizen and citizen’s responsibility to the state.

== Function ==
The Supreme Court is the highest court in the Republic of Moldova that ensures the correct and uniform interpretation and application of legislation by all courts of law. Its role was clarified in legislation enacted in March 2023. Its legislated roles include examining categories of cases established by law, cases of social and legal importance and those which reveal particularly serious violations of law and human rights, and applications for review of cases. The court also submits applications for review of constitutionality of laws and regulations, and may request advisory opinions from the European Court of Human Rights.

== Judges ==
The Higher Magistrates Council makes proposals to the President of the Republic of Moldova, who then appoints the judges of the Supreme Court. Judges are appointed in their positions for an initial five-year term. After five years, judges are appointed for a term of office which expires when they reach a specified age limit.

In 2024, Stela Procopciuc is the Acting Chairperson of the Supreme Court. Previous presidents of the court include Mihai Poalelungi, who served from 2012 to 2018. In 2010 the Chief Justice was Ivars Bickovics.

== Activities ==
In February 2023, twenty of twenty-five judges on the court resigned rather than face new vetting procedures imposed by the government. The new vetting process was part of attempts by the government to clean up possible corruption and vested interests in the judiciary, but was opposed by judges as interference.

In 2024 members of the Supreme Court and the Superior Council of Magistracy of Moldova visited the Council of Europe to strengthen links. Four judges of the Supreme Court were involved in the visit, which was led by Stela Procopciuc, ad interim president of the Supreme Court.
