= Alexandru Tănase =

Moldovan politician (born 1971)

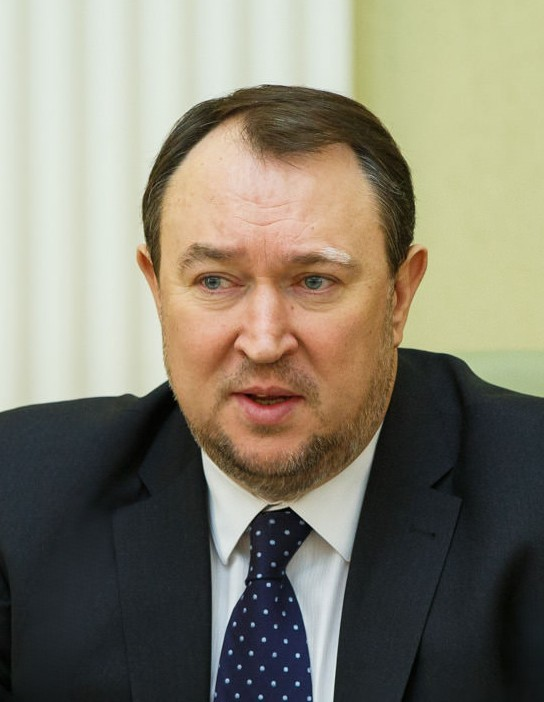
- Tănase in 2018

Minister of Justice
- In office 10 January 2018 – 12 March 2018
- President: Igor Dodon
- Prime Minister: Pavel Filip
- Preceded by: Vladimir Cebotari
- Succeeded by: Victoria Iftodi
- In office 25 September 2009 – 6 May 2011
- President: Mihai Ghimpu (acting); Vlad Filat (acting); Marian Lupu (acting)
- Prime Minister: Vlad Filat
- Preceded by: Vitalie Pîrlog
- Succeeded by: Oleg Efrim

President of the Constitutional Court
- In office 4 October 2011 – 12 May 2017
- Preceded by: Dumitru Pulbere
- Succeeded by: Tudor Panțîru

Judge of the Constitutional Court
- In office 14 April 2011 – 12 May 2017
- Preceded by: Alina Ianucenco
- Succeeded by: Victoria Iftodi

Member of the Moldovan Parliament
- In office 24 December 2010 – 11 February 2011
- Succeeded by: Iurie Apostolachi
- Parliamentary group: Liberal Democratic Party
- In office 22 April 2009 – 25 September 2009
- Succeeded by: Tudor Deliu
- Parliamentary group: Liberal Democratic Party

Member of the Chișinău Municipal Council
- In office 22 June 2007 – 22 April 2009
- Succeeded by: Valeriu Coțaga

Personal details
- Born: 24 February 1971 (age 55) Chişinău, Moldavian SSR, Soviet Union
- Parent: Constantin Tănase
- Education: University of Iaşi (1995)
- Profession: Jurist

Alexandru Tănase (born 24 February 1971) is a Moldovan politician. He is a former president of the Constitutional Court of the Republic of Moldova. He was Justice Minister in the First Vlad Filat Cabinet, and in the first several months of the Second Filat Cabinet.

== Biography ==
Tănase was born on 24 February 1971 in Chișinău. He graduated in law from Alexandru Ioan Cuza University in Iași in 1994 and later pursued postgraduate studies at the State University of Moldova. He also completed specialized training programs in criminal defense techniques organized by the American Bar Association and in the application of the European Convention on Human Rights through programs supported by the Council of Europe and the European Commission.

Tănase began his career as an independent legal adviser in the mid-1990s and was admitted to the Moldovan Bar in 1999. He subsequently worked on judicial reform and governance projects with the United Nations Development Programme and the Soros Foundation Moldova, focusing on strengthening legislative and judicial institutions. Between 2005 and 2009, he practiced law privately, including as a partner in the law firm Hanganu, Tănase și Partenerii.

During his years in private practice, Tănase was involved in several high-profile cases before the European Court of Human Rights in Strasbourg. Among the most notable were the Ilascu case and proceedings challenging restrictions imposed on Moldovan public officials holding Romanian citizenship, which he pursued together with Chișinău mayor Dorin Chirtoacă. He also served as counsel for former Defense Minister Valeriu Pasat in litigation related to the controversial sale of MiG fighter aircraft by the Moldovan government in the late 1990s.

Tănase gained prominence on the national political stage during the late 2000s as a representative of the Moldovan opposition. Following his election to Parliament in the April 2009 elections, he suspended his law license to avoid potential conflicts of interest arising from his legislative mandate.

He was a member of the Liberal Democratic Party of Moldova. Tănase served as First Vice-President of the party from 2007 to 2011 and was elected to the Parliament of Moldova in 2009 and 2010. He held the office of Minister of Justice from September 2009 to May 2011. In April 2011, he was appointed judge of the Constitutional Court of Moldova, and in October of the same year, he was elected President of the Court for a three-year term.

== Personal life ==
Tănase is married and has two children.

== Awards and recognition ==
On 25 February 2016, President Nicolae Timofti awarded Tănase the Order of Honour (Ordinul de Onoare) in recognition of his contribution to national renewal, the development of the rule of law, and his work in constitutional adjudication.

In 2018, Tănase was awarded the rank of Commander of the Order of the Lithuanian Grand Duke Gediminas by Lithuania.

== See also ==
- Tănase v. Moldova
