= Gotești =

- Commune
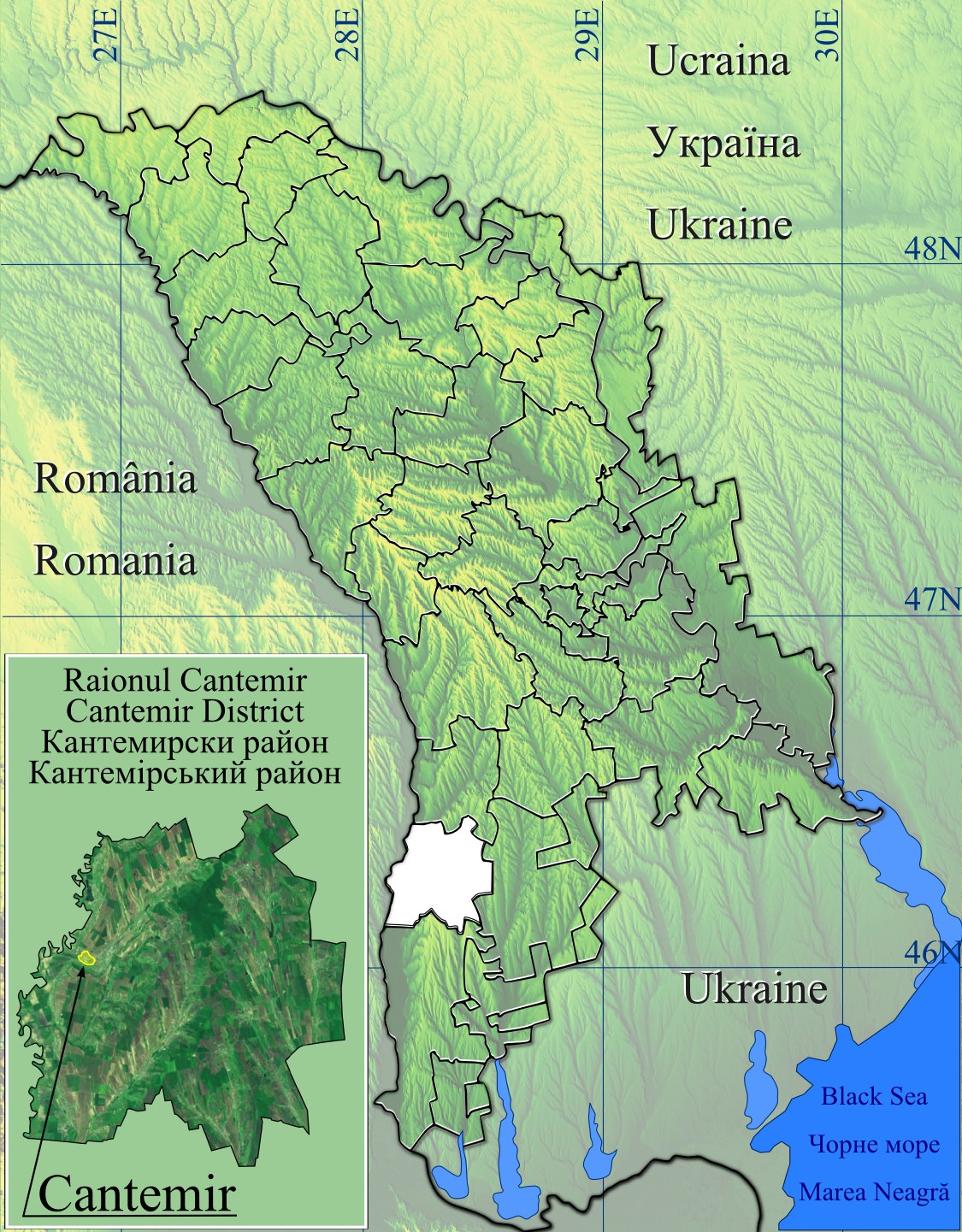
- Location in Moldova
- Coordinates: 46°09′N 28°10′E
- Country: Moldova
- District: Cantemir District

Population (2014)
  - Total: 4,088
- Time zone: UTC+2 (EET)
  - Summer (DST): UTC+3 (EEST)

Gotești is a commune in Cantemir District, Moldova. It is composed of two villages, Constantinești and Gotești.

== Notable people ==
- Gheorghe Stavrii
- Ion Creangă
- Oxana Iuteș
