= Teodor Cârnaț =

Moldovan politician

- Born: February 26, 1972 (age 54); Holercani, Moldavian SSR, Soviet Union
- Occupations: professor, lawyer
- Employer(s): Moldova State University, Professor at Department of Public Law
- Spouse: Unnamed wife (Divorced) Marina Cârnaț
- Children: 11

Teodor Cârnaț (born February 26, 1972) is a Moldovan lawyer, professor, expert in human rights protection and constitutional law. In 2006, he became Executive Director of the Moldovan Helsinki Committee for Human Rights, position held until 2011.

He graduated Holercani school in 1989 cum laudae, in 1989 was admitted and studied a year at the State University of Sports of Moldova, then changed his mind and in 1990 was admitted to the Faculty of Law of Moldova State University, where in 1995 graduated it and works as professor until now.

In 2000, Cârnaț graduated the Faculty of Applied Modern Languages (English Language) at Moldova State University, also in 2000 he obtained the master's degree in law.

Teodor Cârnaț was awarded scientific degree of doctor of philosophy (PhD) in Law in 2001, and since 2004 he is conferred the academic title of University Associate Professor (docent) at the Department of "Constitutional Law and Administrative Law" of Moldova State University.

In 2009 Cârnaț obtained the degree of Doctor Habilitatus in Law, with the thesis paper entitled "Theory and practice of elimination of forms of discrimination in the conditions of contemporary constitutionalism in the Republic of Moldova".

Likewise, since June 2009, Teodor Cârnaț holds the Bachelor of Science in Economics degree, Moldova University of European Studies.

He served as an independent municipal councilor, elected on June 5, 2011 to Chişinău Municipal Council.

On December 24, 2013, Teodor Cârnaț was elected by the Parliament of the Republic of Moldova as a member of the Superior Council of Magistracy.
