= Mihai Poalelungi =

Moldovan jurist

President of the Constitutional Court
- In office 16 March 2018 – 20 June 2019
- Preceded by: Tudor Panțîru
- Succeeded by: Vladimir Țurcan

Judge of the Constitutional Court
- In office 6 March 2018 – 20 June 2019
- Preceded by: Tudor Panțîru

Personal details
- Born: 13 September 1962 (age 63) Corjova, Moldavian SSR, Soviet Union

Mihai Poalelungi (born 13 September 1962) is a Moldovan jurist and former judge. He served as the President of the Constitutional Court of Moldova from 2018 until his resignation in June 2019.
