= Ion Creangă (jurist) =

Moldovan jurist

- Born: 11 December 1962 (age 63); Gotești
- Education: Moldova State University
- Occupation: Jurist
- Employer: Parliament of Moldova

Ion Creangă (born 11 December 1962) is a Moldovan jurist and was the head of the Legal Department of the Parliament of Moldova until his arrest in July 2024 for espionage.

== Early life ==
Creangă was born in Gotești, Cantemir District. He studied at the Moldova State University (1987–1992) and obtained his PhD in 2000.

== Civil service career ==
Creangă was the head of the Legal Department of the Apparatus of the Parliament of Moldova. He was also the secretary of the Commission for constitutional reform in Moldova.

On 30 July 2024, Creangă was caught red-handed "providing information to a Russian agent" and relieved of his duties. The Parliament was raided in the process of the investigation. As a result the Ambassador of the Russian Federation to the Republic of Moldova, Oleg Vasnetsov, was summoned for an explanation to the Ministry of Foreign Affairs of Moldova on 1 August. It was reported that the assistant to the military attaché of the embassy had been caught with Creangă, and this person upon deportation was named as Dmitri Kelov, who had been on the Joint Control Commission, a trilateral structure responsible for overseeing the situation in the security zone between Transnistria and territory under Moldovan control.
