= Constitution of the Moldavian Soviet Socialist Republic =

The Constitution of the Moldavian Soviet Socialist Republic of 15 April 1978 was the communist state constitution and fundamental law of the Moldovan SSR, adopted in 1978.

== History ==
At its Extraordinary Session of 15 April 1978, the Supreme Soviet of the Moldavian Socialist Republic unanimously adopted a new republican Constitution, to replace the old Constitution of 12 January 1941, including its subsequent amendments. The new Constitution consisted of a Preamble and 172 articles, and was prepared as part of the whole project of adjusting all 15 republican Constitutions to the new 1977 Constitution of the Soviet Union.

It was the second Constitution of the Moldavian SSR.

On 27 August 1994 the Constitution of the Moldavian SSR of 15 April 1978, including all its subsequent revisions and amendments, was abrogated in its entirety. On that same date the new Constitution of Moldova came into force.
