= Ion Creangă (politician) =

Bessarabian politician

Member of the Moldovan Parliament
- In office 1917–1918

Personal details
- Born: 1883 Corjova, Dubăsari
- Died: Unknown

Ion Creangă (born 1883 in Corjova) was a Bessarabian politician.

== Biography ==
He served as Member of the Moldovan Parliament (1917–1918). He also worked as teacher in Dubăsari.

== Gallery ==
Moldovan stamp, 1998

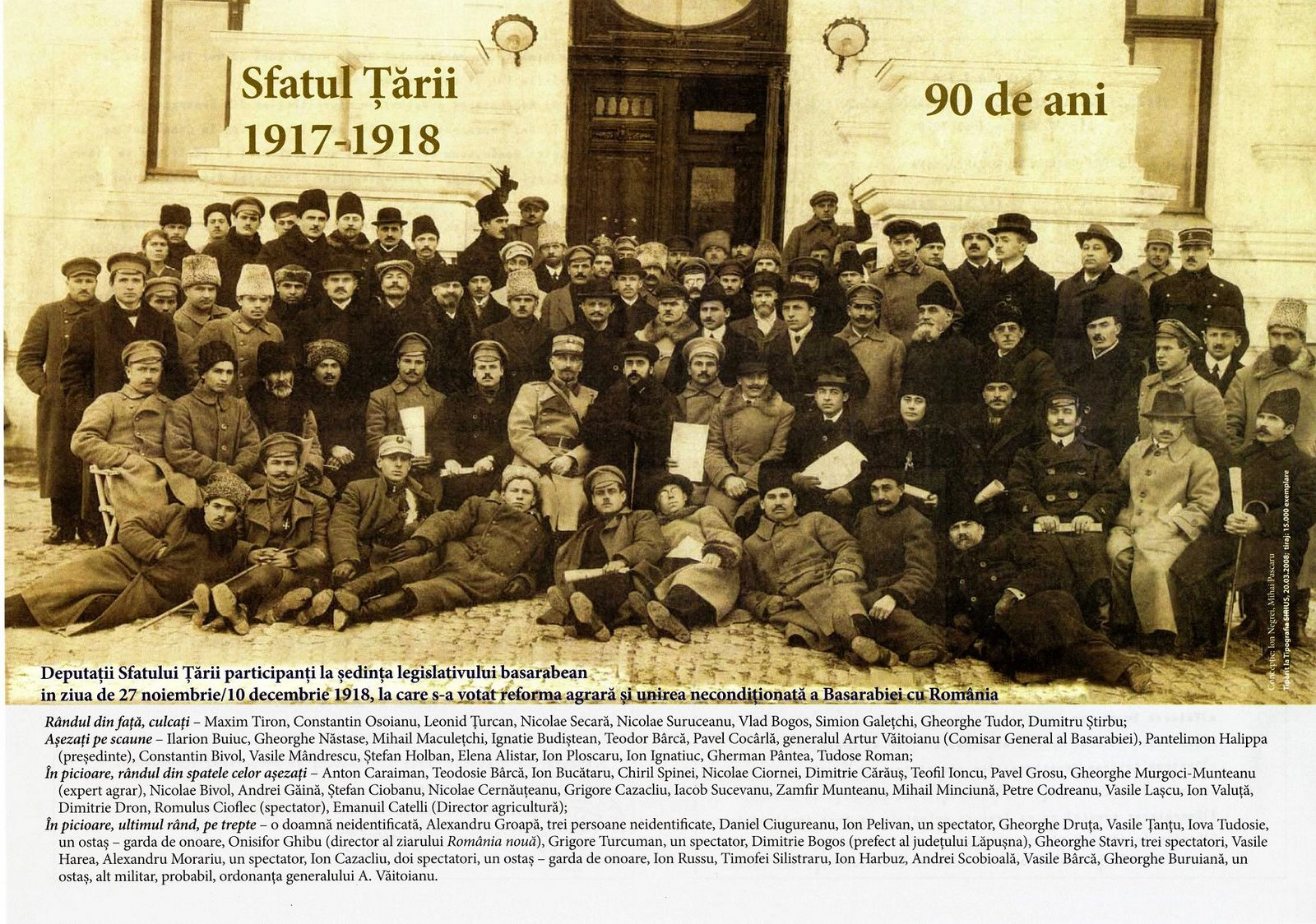
Sfatul Țării Palace, December 10, 1918
