= Constitutional Court of Moldova =

- Romanian: Curtea Constituțională a Republicii Moldova (CCM)
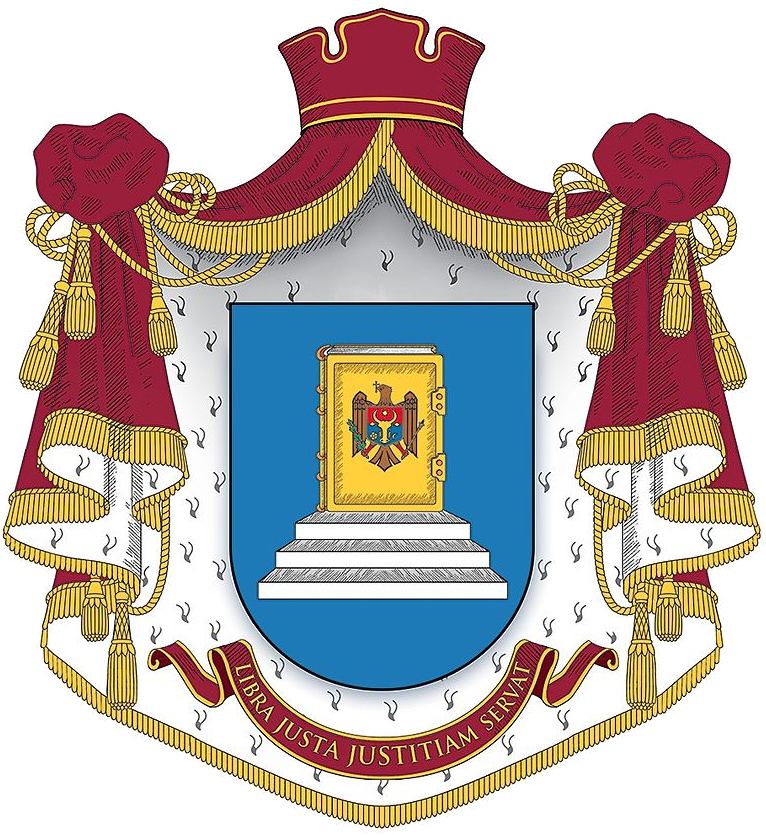
- Established: February 23, 1995; 31 years ago
- Location: Chișinău
- Authorised by: Constitution of Moldova
- Judge term length: 6 years, 2 terms only
- Number of positions: 6
- Language: Romanian
- Website: constcourt.md

President of the Constitutional Court
- Currently: Domnica Manole
- Since: 10 November 2023

The Constitutional Court of the Republic of Moldova (Romanian: Curtea Constituțională a Republicii Moldova) represents the sole body of constitutional jurisdiction in the Republic of Moldova, autonomous and independent from the executive, the legislature and the judiciary.

The task of the constitutional court is to guarantee the supremacy of the Constitution, to ensure the principle of separation of State powers into the legislative, executive and judicial branches, to guarantee the observance of the State's responsibility towards the citizen and the citizen's responsibility towards the State.

Upon request, the Constitutional Court interprets the Constitution and undertakes the review of constitutionality of the Parliament's laws and decisions, the decrees of the President and the acts of the Government.

The court's existence was provided for by the Constitution, adopted in July 1994. It was created in February 1995.

== Appointment of judges ==
The court's 6 judges serve 6-year terms and are elected by the Moldovan parliament, the Moldovan government and the judicial Superior Council of Magistrates. Each of these bodies elect 2 judges. The judges are then formally appointed by the President.

== Presidents ==
The following judges have served as presidents of the court:

#	Portrait	Name (Birth–Death)	Office term	
1		Pavel Barbalat (1935–2004)	23 February 1995	23 February 2001
2		Victor Pușcaș (1943–2023)	27 February 2001	15 February 2007
3		Dumitru Pulbere (born 1952)	1 March 2007	28 September 2011
4		Alexandru Tănase (born 1971)	4 October 2011	12 May 2017
5		Tudor Panțîru (born 1951)	12 May 2017	31 January 2018
6		Mihai Poalelungi (born 1962)	16 March 2018	20 June 2019
7		Vladimir Țurcan (born 1954)	19 August 2019	23 April 2020
8		Domnica Manole (born 1961)	23 April 2020	25 April 2023
9		Nicolae Roșca (born 1962)	25 April 2023	9 November 2023
10		Domnica Manole (born 1961)	10 November 2023	Incumbent
